= 2006 New Orleans city council election =

New Orleans' city council elections were held on April 22, 2006, and runoff elections were held on May 20, 2006.

== At-Large Council Spots ==
City Council of New Orleans At-Large election results
Party	Candidate	Votes	%
Democratic	Oliver M. Thomas	66,374	39
Democratic	Jacquelyn Brechtel Clarkson	36,839	22
Democratic	Arnie Fielkow	31,092	18
Democratic	David Lapin	9,239	5
Democratic	Leonard Lucas, Jr.	8,736	5
Republican	Michael T. Gray	7,220	4
Independent	Roger Wilson	2,985	2
Republican	Alden G. Hagardorn	2,579	2
Independent	William "Poppa" Grant	1,919	1
Democratic	Carlos J. Hornbrook	1,701	1
Independent	"Les" Evenchick	681	0

City Council of New Orleans At-Large runoff results
Party	Candidate	Votes	%
Democratic	Arnie Fielkow	61,420	56
Democratic	Jacquelyn Brechtel Clarkson	47,324	44

== District A ==
City Council of New Orleans District A election results
Party	Candidate	Votes	%
Republican	John "Jay" Batt	20,805	40
Democratic	Shelly Stephenson Midura	7,703	28
Republican	Salvador "Sal" Palmisano III	3,272	12
Republican	Thomas "Tom" Wagner	2,445	9
Independent	Sonia Gupta	1,228	5
Independent	Stephen Saussy	1,024	4
Independent	Ray Landeche	405	1
Independent	David Nowak	272	1

City Council of New Orleans District A runoff results
Party	Candidate	Votes	%
Democratic	Shelly Stephenson Midura	14,552	52
Republican	John "Jay" Batt	13,670	48

== District B ==
City Council of New Orleans District B election results
Party	Candidate	Votes	%
Democratic	Renee Gill Pratt	7,042	40
Democratic	Stacy Head	6,691	38
Democratic	Mìchael A. Duplantier	1,933	11
Democratic	Shane P. Landry	680	4
Independent	Quentin R. Brown	654	4
Democratic	Marshall Truehill, Jr.	626	4

City Council of New Orleans District B runoff results
Party	Candidate	Votes	%
Democratic	Stacy Head	10,214	54
Democratic	Renee Gill Pratt	8,694	46

== District C ==
City Council of New Orleans District C election results
Party	Candidate	Votes	%
Democratic	James Carter	7,137	33
Democratic	Kristin Gisleson Palmer	4,677	22
Democratic	Mike Early	4,204	19
Democratic	Jane Ettinger Booth	3,902	18
Independent	Julian Doerr	1,098	5
Democratic	Charles P. Duffy III	313	1
Democratic	Gregg Huber	293	1

City Council of New Orleans District C runoff results
Party	Candidate	Votes	%
Democratic	James Carter	12,112	53
Democratic	Kristin Gisleson Palmer	10,815	47

== District D ==
City Council of New Orleans District D election results
Party	Candidate	Votes	%
Democratic	Cynthia Hedge-Morrell	10,889	56
Democratic	Louella Givens	4,194	22
Independent	Van Robichaux	2,161	11
Democratic	Darrell R. Gray	1,938	10
Democratic	Abron Morgan	220	1

== District E ==
City Council of New Orleans District E election results
Party	Candidate	Votes	%
Democratic	Cynthia Willard-Lewis	11,593	71
Democratic	Nolan Marshall	2,507	15
Democratic	Myron L. Mitchell	444	3
Democratic	Cederick Favaroth	426	3
Democratic	Shawn Lockett	363	2
Republican	John D. Zimmer	324	2
Democratic	Willie L. Jones Jr.	278	2
Independent	Wayne A. Johnson	181	1
Democratic	William James Willis III	165	1

== See also ==
- New Orleans City Council
- 2006 New Orleans mayoral election
