= Helena Moreno =

Mayor of New Orleans since 2026

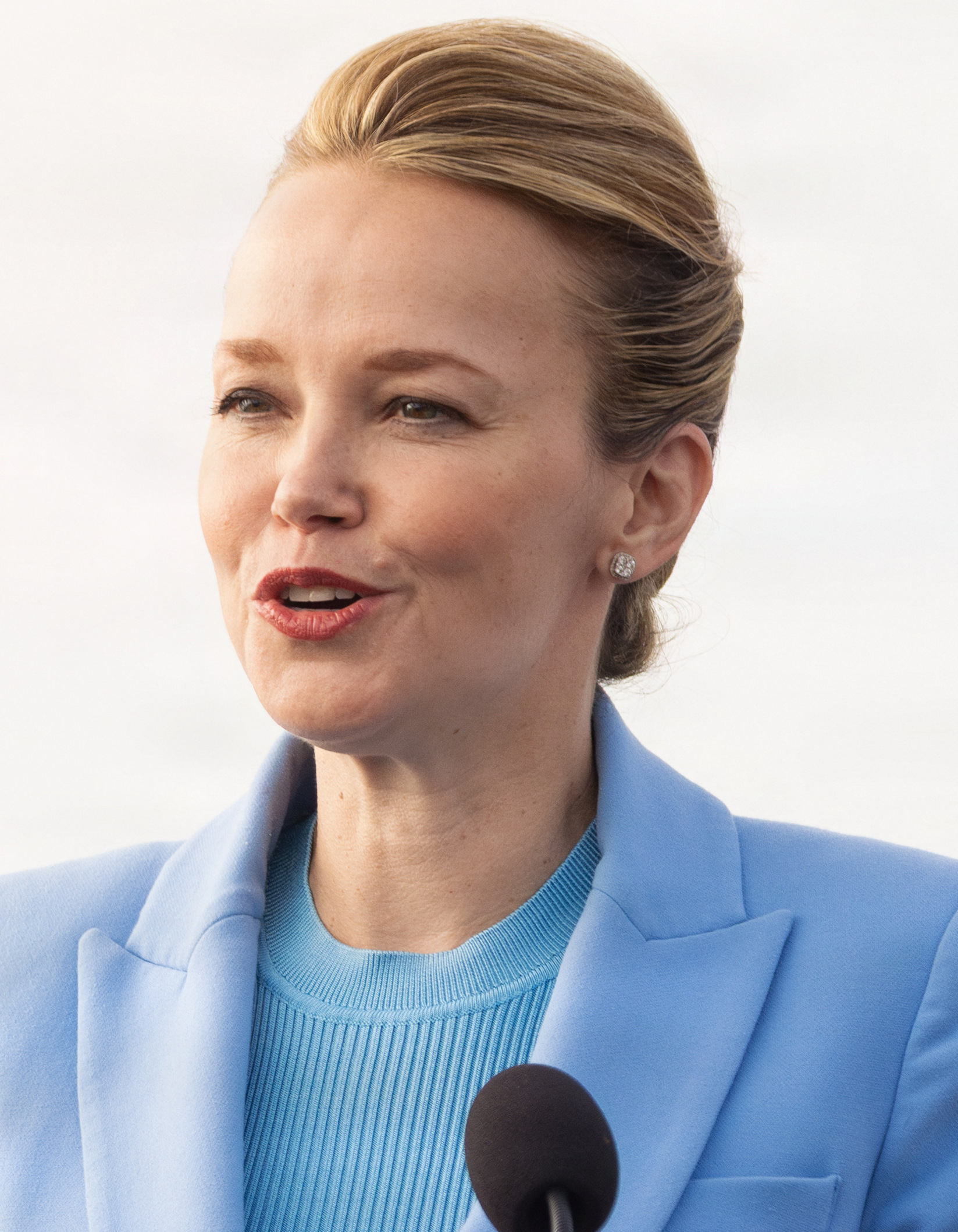
- Moreno in 2026

63rd Mayor of New Orleans
- Incumbent
- Assumed office January 12, 2026
- Preceded by: LaToya Cantrell

President of the New Orleans City Council
- In office June 2019 – January 5, 2023
- Preceded by: Jason Williams
- Succeeded by: Jean-Paul Morrell

Member of the New Orleans City Council from the at-large district Position 1
- In office June 2018 – January 12, 2026
- Preceded by: Stacy Head
- Succeeded by: Matthew Willard

Member of the Louisiana House of Representatives from the 93rd district
- In office May 2010 – April 9, 2018
- Preceded by: Karen Carter Peterson
- Succeeded by: Royce Duplessis

Personal details
- Born: Helena Nancy Moreno; September 30, 1977 (age 49) Xalapa, Veracruz, Mexico
- Party: Democratic
- Spouse: Chris Meeks
- Education: Southern Methodist University (BA)

Helena Nancy Moreno (born September 30, 1977) is an American politician and former journalist who has served as the 63rd mayor of New Orleans since January 2026. A member of the Democratic Party, Moreno served from 2010 to 2018 as a member of the Louisiana House of Representatives for the 93rd district. She is New Orleans' first Hispanic and second female mayor.

Moreno served as an at-large member of the New Orleans City Council from 2017 until her inauguration as mayor, as well as its president from 2019 to 2023.

On October 8, 2024, Moreno filed paperwork to run for mayor of New Orleans in the 2025 election. Moreno avoided a runoff and was elected mayor of New Orleans in October 2025 with 55% of the vote.

== Early life and education ==
Helena Nancy Moreno was born on September 30, 1977, in Xalapa, Mexico, the first child of oil executive Felix Moreno and academic Nancy Pearson. Her family later moved to Houston, Texas, where she graduated from Episcopal High School in 1995. In 1999, she earned a bachelor of arts degree in mass communications from Southern Methodist University in Dallas. While at SMU, she wrote for the Daily Campus newspaper and became an exchange student at American University in Washington, D.C., where she interned at the White House for First Lady Hillary Clinton. Moreno is fluent in English and Spanish, and spent six months studying in Madrid as an undergraduate.

== Career ==
=== Journalism ===
Moreno completed internships with KTRK-TV and KHOU-TV in Houston during her undergraduate years at SMU. After graduation, she worked as a reporter for WTOC-TV in Savannah, Georgia. In 2001, she was recruited by the Hearst-Argyle Broadcasting Corporation to work at WDSU-TV in New Orleans. There, she became anchor for the morning news. Moreno received a Broadcaster of the Year award from the Louisiana Federation of Teachers for her reporting on Hurricane Katrina in 2005. She was also voted best television reporter by Gambit readers for four years and won a local Emmy Award for her Hurricane Katrina coverage.

Moreno left her career in broadcasting in 2008 to pursue public service.

=== Politics ===
In March 2008, Moreno resigned from her position at WDSU-TV to challenge then-incumbent U.S. Representative William J. Jefferson in Louisiana's 2nd congressional district Democratic primary election. She received sufficient votes to force the incumbent into a runoff election, which she lost. Jefferson was subsequently defeated in the general election by Republican Joseph Cao, whom Moreno endorsed along with other Democrats such as New Orleans City Council members Jackie Clarkson and Stacy Head.

In 2010, after the election of Karen Carter Peterson to the Louisiana State Senate, Moreno became a candidate for Peterson's vacated District 93 seat in the Louisiana House of Representatives. The special election primary took place on May 1, 2010, with Moreno obtaining 27% of the vote and entering a runoff election with James Perry, who had garnered 38%. Her runoff campaign was overshadowed by personal controversies, including an allegation of a major traffic violation, which became a central focus. However, the Perry campaign's questionable handling of the allegation two weeks before the runoff led the New Orleans Times-Picayune to withdraw its endorsement of Perry. (The newspaper endorsed neither candidate in the race.) Moreno won the election on May 29, 2010 and was unopposed for reelection in 2011.

On October 14, 2017, Moreno won the Division 1 at-large seat on the New Orleans City Council, defeating two opponents by nearly a 2-to-1 margin and avoiding a runoff. She served as city council president from 2019 to 2023, after which she became vice president.

== Mayor of New Orleans ==
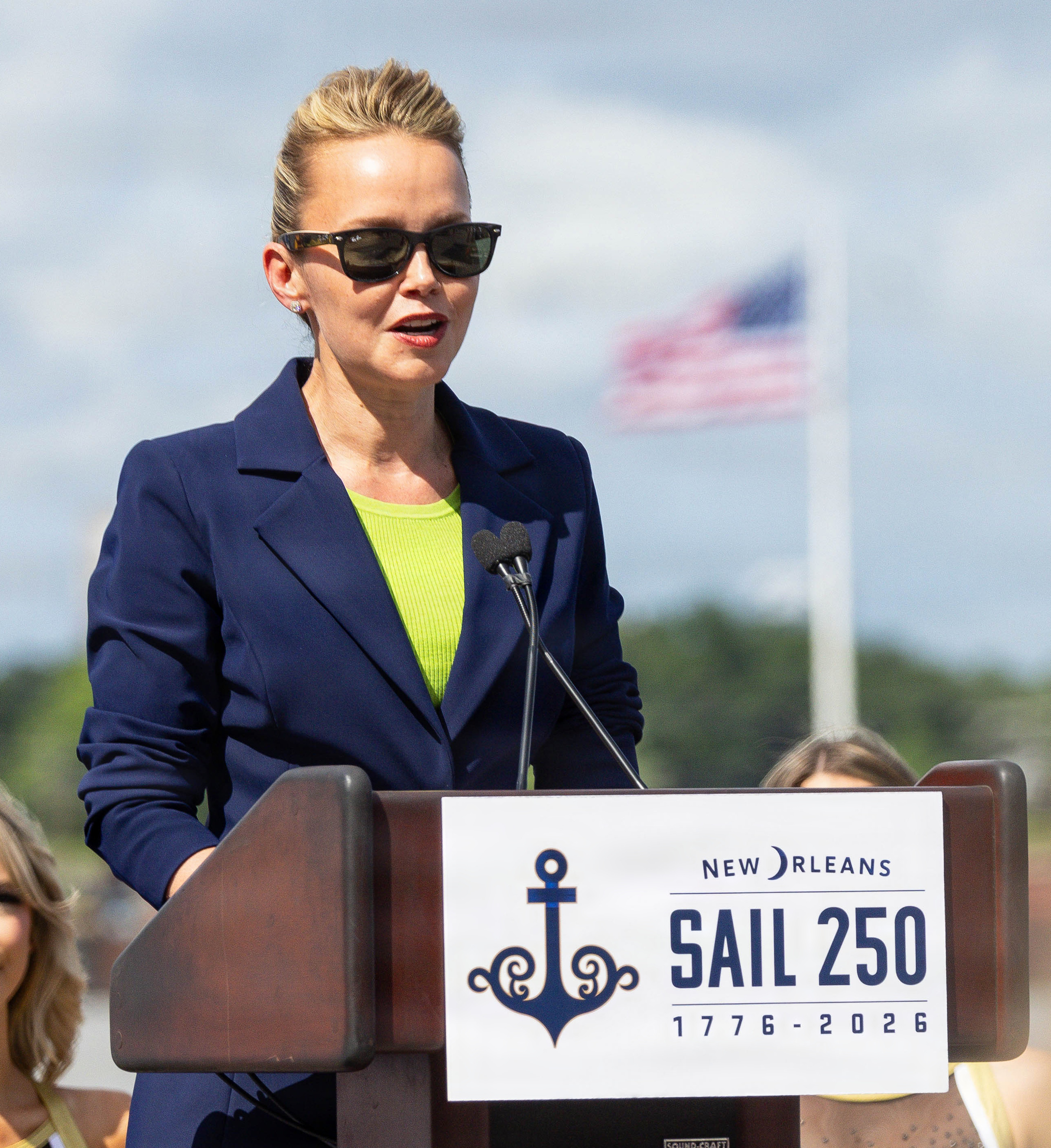
Moreno speaking at a Sail 250 New Orleans event, May 2026

On October 8, 2024, Moreno filed paperwork to run for mayor of New Orleans. On October 11, 2025, she was elected mayor, avoiding a runoff by winning 55% of the vote over Royce Duplessis and Oliver Thomas who came second and third respectively. On January 12, 2026, Moreno was sworn into office by former U.S. Vice President and 2024 Democratic presidential nominee Kamala Harris.

== Personal life ==
Moreno is also a realtor with Talbot Realty Group in New Orleans and resides in Uptown, New Orleans with her husband, Chris Meeks.

=== Involvement in fatal car crash ===
On October 14, 2002, a Jeep Grand Cherokee driven by Moreno was struck by a car that had run a red light at Martin Luther King Jr. Boulevard and Carondelet Street, according to a police report. A passenger in the other car died. According to the report, Moreno admitted to driving 35 in a 25 mph zone, and the investigator determined that the other car ran the red light. The police report notes that Moreno was taken to the Ochsner Foundation Hospital by police officers before investigators arrived. At the hospital, she answered authorities' questions and submitted to blood and urine tests. The report states that Moreno "did not display any signs of impairment ... or the odor of alcoholic beverages on her breath," and concludes that if the driver of the other vehicle had "not disregarded the traffic signal, the crash may not have occurred."

In 2010, her involvement in the fatal traffic accident was publicly scrutinized, with opponents raising allegations of negligent homicide and preferential treatment by law enforcement.

Political offices
Preceded by LaToya Cantrell	Mayor of New Orleans; 2026–present	Incumbent
