= Lesli Harris =

American lawyer and politician from New Orleans

Member of the New Orleans City Council from District B
- Incumbent
- Assumed office January 2022
- Preceded by: Jay H. Banks

Personal details
- Party: Democratic
- Education: University of Virginia (BA); Tulane University Law School (JD); New York University School of Law (LLM)
- Occupation: Lawyer, politician

Lesli Harris is an American lawyer and politician who has served as a member of the New Orleans City Council for District B since 2022. A member of the Democratic Party, she was first elected in 2021, defeating incumbent Jay H. Banks, and was re-elected without opposition in 2025.

== Early life and education ==
Harris grew up in rural Ohio. She received a Bachelor of Arts from the University of Virginia in 1997 and a Juris Doctor, cum laude, from Tulane University Law School in 2002. In 2008 she earned a Master of Laws in international trade regulation from New York University School of Law.

== Legal and university career ==
Harris was admitted to the Louisiana bar in 2002 and the New York bar in 2009. After law school, she joined the New Orleans law firm Stone Pigman Walther Wittmann, where she became a partner, practicing intellectual property, employment, and higher education law. She also taught classes at Tulane Law School. Her clients included the New Orleans Saints and New Orleans Pelicans. In 2018 she received the National Bar Association's Sports and Entertainment Lawyer of the Year award.

In September 2018, Harris became the first chief of staff to Loyola University New Orleans president Tania Tetlow, also serving as the president's executive counsel. During her tenure she led the university's public health team overseeing its COVID-19 response. She left Loyola in January 2021 to become senior counsel at the law firm Kelly Hart & Hallman. In January 2026, she joined the New Orleans office of Baker Donelson as special counsel, practicing commercial litigation, intellectual property, and media and entertainment law.

== New Orleans City Council ==
=== 2021 election ===
Harris ran for the District B seat in 2021 against incumbent Jay H. Banks. In the November 13 primary, Banks led with 44.6 percent to Harris's 36.7 percent, sending the two to a runoff. During the campaign, Harris criticized Banks's former work as a lobbyist for Entergy, while Banks criticized her donations from nightclub owners. Harris was endorsed by council president Helena Moreno and U.S. Representative Troy Carter; Banks was backed by Mayor LaToya Cantrell and Governor John Bel Edwards. Harris won the December 11 runoff with 56.6 percent of the vote.

=== Tenure ===
==== Budget chair ====
In January 2026, at the start of her second term, the council unanimously selected Harris to chair its Budget, Audit, and Board of Review Committee, as the city faced a budget deficit of more than $220 million. In that role she worked with the Municipal and Traffic Court of New Orleans to transfer $5 million from the court's reserves, generated by court costs and fees, to the city's general budget to help maintain essential services.

==== Sexual assault kit backlog ====
Harris secured $3 million in city funding to address a backlog of untested sexual assault kits from Orleans Parish awaiting processing at the Louisiana State Police crime lab. By April 2025, outsourced labs had processed 914 of roughly 1,000 backlogged kits. She has also pushed to open a crime lab for the New Orleans Police Department, targeted for 2027.

==== Affordable housing ====
Harris was a lead council sponsor of a 2024 amendment to the city charter creating a dedicated Housing Trust Fund, which requires the city to set aside at least 2 percent of its general fund each year beginning in 2026—about $17 million annually—for affordable rental housing, preservation, and homeownership. The measure was supported by all seven councilmembers. Voters approved it in November 2024 with more than 75 percent of the vote. The Bureau of Governmental Research raised concerns that locking the dedication into the charter would make it difficult to change in the future.

In 2024, Harris sponsored two zoning changes intended to make smaller housing projects easier to build: one allowing residential units above the ground floor by right in commercial and institutional districts, and another allowing small multifamily affordable developments to be split into two detached structures on one lot, avoiding costly sprinkler requirements for three- and four-unit buildings. In November 2025, the council approved gap financing, championed by Harris, for four developments totaling about 600 housing units, most of them affordable, including 103 affordable senior apartments at the B. W. Cooper site in District B.

==== Homelessness ====
In 2023, Harris introduced ordinances addressing the cleanup of homeless encampments and a public-awareness campaign about charitable giving to unhoused people. In February 2024, she announced Home for Good New Orleans, an initiative she devised with partners including UNITY of Greater New Orleans, the Greater New Orleans Foundation, United Way of Southeast Louisiana, and the city's Office of Homeless Services and Strategy. The program moves people from encampments directly into housing, paying for furniture, security deposits, and landlord incentives, with the goal of ending unsheltered homelessness in the city by the end of 2025. By November 2024, the program had relocated 663 people from the unsheltered population, and city officials reported a 12 percent reduction in unsheltered homelessness during its first four months. Harris also announced that Odyssey House Louisiana would operate the city's low-barrier shelter.

Harris criticized Governor Jeff Landry's relocation of unhoused people ahead of Super Bowl LIX, arguing that such sweeps scatter people and make it harder for caseworkers to keep in contact with those they are trying to house, and faulted the state for declining an $8 million request to support the city's efforts.

=== 2025 re-election ===
Harris was the only New Orleans City Council member to draw no opponent in the 2025 municipal elections, and was re-elected without appearing on the ballot.

== Electoral history ==
2021 New Orleans City Council District B primary
Candidate	Party	Votes	%
Jay H. Banks (incumbent)	Democratic	5,896	44.6
Lesli Harris	Democratic	4,850	36.7
Rella Zapletal	—	—	14.2
Rosalind Reed-Thibodeaux	—	—	4.5

2021 New Orleans City Council District B runoff
Candidate	Party	Votes	%
Lesli Harris	Democratic	6,243	56.6
Jay H. Banks (incumbent)	Democratic	4,790	43.4
