= Cynthia Willard-Lewis =

American politician

Cynthia W. Willard-Lewis

Louisiana State Senator for District 2 (Orleans Parish)
- In office 2010–2012
- Preceded by: Ann Duplessis
- Succeeded by: Troy E. Brown

Louisiana State Representative for District 100 (Orleans Parish)
- In office 1993–2000
- Preceded by: David Armstrong
- Succeeded by: Pat Swilling

New Orleans City Council member for District E
- In office 2000–2010
- Preceded by: Lula Harris Breaux (interim)
- Succeeded by: Jon Johnson

Personal details
- Born: Cynthia W. Willard; 1952 (age 73–74) New Orleans, Louisiana, U.S.
- Party: Democratic
- Parent(s): Elliott and Jane Willard
- Education: Xavier University of Louisiana
- Occupation: Public relations consultant

Cynthia W. Willard-Lewis (born 1952) is an American politician in Louisiana. A Democrat from New Orleans, Louisiana, she served briefly in the Louisiana State Senate and for longer periods in the Louisiana House of Representatives and on the New Orleans City Council.

She was elected from Senate District 2 in a special election held on October 2, 2010, to replace Ann Duplessis, who resigned to take a position in the administration of Mayor Mitch Landrieu. Displaced by redistricting, Willard-Lewis ran in the nonpartisan blanket primary held on October 22, 2011, for the District 3 seat in the state Senate. She was instead defeated by another Democrat, the incumbent senator, Jean-Paul Morrell, who polled 11,280 votes (53.3 percent) to Willard-Lewis' 9,911 votes (46.8 percent).

Willard-Lewis also represented District 100 in the Louisiana House from 1993 to 2000, when she was elected to the New Orleans City Council. She left the council in 2010 under term limits. She was succeeded in the House by Pat Swilling, a former National Football League linebacker.

In 2006, Willard-Lewis, together with then Mayor Ray Nagin supported the opponents of a landfill project led by then-future U.S. Representative Republican Joseph Cao of Louisiana's 2nd congressional district. In 2009, Willard-Lewis was back in the news for telling fellow Councilwoman Stacy Head to "sit down with your prop" when Head was displaying a poster critical of the Orleans Parish garbage-collection fees—a discussion which preceded the New Orleans e-mail controversy.

In 2007, when Oliver Thomas was eliminated from an at-large seat on the New Orleans City Council because of conviction for bribery, Willard-Lewis attempted to win the at-large seat but was defeated by then-former Councilwoman Jacquelyn Brechtel Clarkson in a special election which received national attention because the result changed the racial majority of the council.

Willard-Lewis is the daughter of Dr. Elliot Willard and his wife, Jane. She graduated from historically black Xavier University of Louisiana, where she was a member of Zeta Phi Beta sorority. She is a former first runner-up in the Black Miss America Pageant.

Willard-Lewis participates in a number of community organizations, including the NAACP. She attends Saint Raymond's Roman Catholic Church. By profession she is a public relations consultant for Lakeland Hospital. She has two children.

== Notes ==
Louisiana State Senate
Preceded by Ann Duplessis	Louisiana State Senator from District 2; 2010–2012	Succeeded by Troy E. Brown
Louisiana House of Representatives
Preceded by David Armstrong	Louisiana State Representative from District 100; 1993–2000	Succeeded by Pat Swilling
