= Stacy Head =

American lawyer and politician

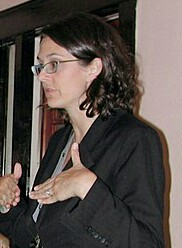
- Stacy Head

President New Orleans City Council
- In office 2012 – June 2017
- Preceded by: Arnie Fielkow
- Succeeded by: Jason Williams

Member of the New Orleans City Council At-large – Division 1
- In office May 2, 2012 – June 2017
- Preceded by: Eric Granderson
- Succeeded by: Helena Moreno

Member of the New Orleans City Council District B
- In office June 1, 2006 – May 2, 2012
- Preceded by: Renée Gill Pratt
- Succeeded by: Diana Bajoie (interim)

Personal details
- Born: Stacy Aline Singleton; June 30, 1969 (age 57)
- Party: Democratic
- Spouse: Jeremy Thomas Head

Stacy Aline Singleton Head (born June 30, 1969) is an American lawyer and former president of the New Orleans City Council.

== Early life and career ==
Stacy Head was born in 1969 as the daughter of the former Katherine Hamberlin and Ernest Lynn Singleton. She grew up in Greensburg, Saint Helena Parish, in southeastern Louisiana. She has a (younger) brother, Michael Lynn Singleton.

Head is by profession an attorney-at-law; she clerked for Phelps Dunbar LLC from 1991 to 1995 when she finished her juris doctor degree at Louisiana State University's Paul M. Hebert Law Center and began working for Stanley, Flanagan & Reuter LLC. Her association with politics had begun when, as an undergraduate, she worked for the Louisiana Legislature although at the time she anticipated no notion of ever seeking elective office. That interest began in the aftermath of Hurricane Katrina when the New Orleans City Council "unanimously asked Gov. Kathleen Blanco to extend daylight-saving time just for Orleans Parish"—an idea which Head found not only "impractical" but also "tinged with mad futility"; she compared it to King Canute's attempt to hold back the sea. In June 2007 she completed Harvard University's John F. Kennedy School of Government course for Senior Executives in State and Local Government.

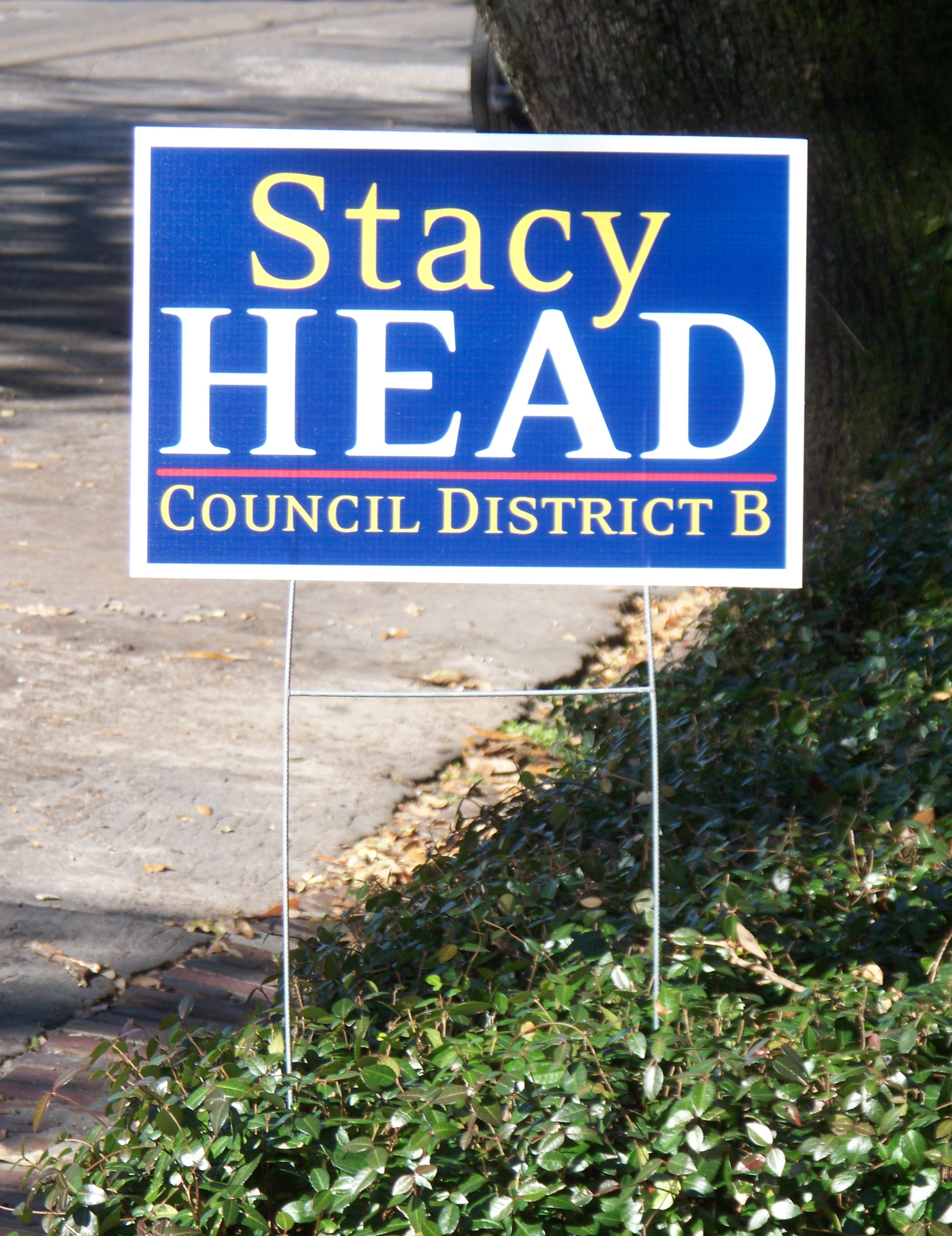
Head seeks reelection to District B in 2010.

== Election to city council ==
Stacy Head was elected to the New Orleans City Council in 2006, defeating incumbent Renée Gill Pratt. Councilmember Head's candidacy benefited from concerns about governmental effectiveness and efficiency in dealing with Hurricane Katrina and its aftermath, developers who had obviated the desires of neighborhood residents, and affinities between incumbent Gill Pratt and then-Congressman William J. Jefferson (D), already under investigation on a variety of felony charges. Bruce Nolan of the Times-Picayune has described as "intense, caffeinated personal" Head's approach to her work on the Council. New Orleans writer Nordette Adams (nomme de plume Vérité Parlant) has described Head as a "drama queen" (together with less-flattering designations).

== Garbage and e-mail controversies ==
In 2008, Councilmember Head began delving into the relationship between fees collected and services rendered by the Sanitation Department, which, along with its director Veronica White, was alleged by WWL-TV New Orleans Channel 4 (CBS) to be on too-friendly terms with the office of mayor Ray Nagin. The Council generally supported Head's inquiries.

=== Retaliation to garbage inquiry ===
White retaliated by giving thousands of e-mail messages, from the computer accounts of the four white members of the Council, to activist lawyer Tracie Washington, under the proviso of freedom of information but without proper redaction by city attorney Penya Moses-Fields, to remove statements protected by law. Washington, sympathetic to White, had set about to post the messages on the internet when a federal court, at the request of sources supportive of the Council, enjoined Washington from doing so and subpoenaed (and acquired) White's computers to thwart the possibility that messages on them from the Council might become published.

That e-mail controversy followed on the heels of an earlier e-mail controversy, after WWL-TV New Orleans Channel 4 (CBS) sued the mayor's office in an attempt to gain 6 months of e-mails as a public record.

In the context of the convoluted e-mail controversies Times-Picayune columnist Jarvis DeBerry proposed (perhaps tongue in cheek) that Council members communicate exclusively by means other than e-mail. DeBerry's column was met with a letter-to-the-editor rejoinder by Steven J. Lane (a legal counsel in the city attorney's office), who—after analyzing the potential insecurities of communication via snail-mail, fax, telephone, and face-to-face conversation—described DeBerry's recommendation as folly. DeBerry observed that Lane's assertions his office needed more time to vet the e-mails was met by Civil District Judge Madeleine Landrieu's retort that "We're not going to take thousands of hours"; then DeBerry commented:

I don't know how to reconcile Lane's suggestion that going through all the e-mails amounts to a Herculean task with Lane's suggestion that going through all the e-mails can take a few weeks with Lane's suggestion that going through all the e-mails can take "thousands of hours."

On 2009 May 27 the Times-Picayune reported that the number of e-mails involved in the suit by WWL-TV was 135,144 and that vetting of them could take up to 15 months, despite a cautionary statement that "We're not going to take thousands of hours" by District Judge Madeleine Landrieu. On 2009 May 29 the Times-Picayune editorialized against a request by Lane that Louisiana Attorney General Buddy Caldwell issue a legal opinion on the amount of time available to redact the e-mails and the nature of information which can be withheld. The editorial insisted that

The state's Open Records Act is a straightforward statute, with ample jurisprudence and set mechanisms for resolving disputes in court.

=== Internet posting ===
On 2009 May 13, prior to a stay ordered by the state supreme court, Washington briefly posted on the internet certain of Head's e-mail messages. The messages, wrote Bruce Eggler in the Times-Picayune, appeared to have been chosen to cause her [Councilmember Head] maximum personal and political embarrassment.

They contain disparaging references to City Councilwoman Jackie Clarkson and other public figures and an irate description of the allegedly extravagant purchases of a food-stamp recipient in line ahead of Head at a grocery. In the latter message, Head, a Democrat, threatens to vote for "the freak" Republican presidential candidate John McCain and his "trash bag" running mate, Sarah Palin.

Observing that in the e-mails Head had labeled Clarkson an "ASSS" (sic), James Gill took the occasion to criticize Head's spelling:

It is quite an achievement for an elected official to turn off Democrats and Republicans in one sentence, and no doubt Head will be more careful with her e-mails from now on. Perhaps that will improve her spelling.

When Head began publishing the e-mail messages herself on 2009 May 18, she was promptly interviewed by WDSU-TV. In the interview Head said that "The person who hates me deep down more than anything has had my e-mails" in referring to Tracie Washington.

As Head's e-mail messages became public, by 2009 June 25 it was apparent that "hostility" (the word used by the Times-Picayune) between Head and Washington involved assessments of Washington's house, messages by Head to her lawyer confidante Nyka Scott alleging that Washington's home had been under-valued by the assessor to lower Washington's taxes. Head's e-mail also revealed thoughts and potential plans for a retaliatory demonstration in front of Washington's house after a demonstration by Washington's supporters in front of Head's house. Head had incorrectly indicated Washington's house as being in the assessment territory of assessor Nancy Marshall, but the property is actually in the territory of assessor Henry Heaton. Both Marshall and Heaton said that Head had never communicated with either of them about the valuation of Washington's property—a request that they said would have been unethical in that the City Council reviews appeals of assessments retroactively but does not interfere with assessments of individuals proactively. City Council president Arnie Fielkow clarified:

I don't think it's right of us that are privileged to be on City Council to be asking others to look at assessments of particular people. I think that's very wrong.

Head denied that alleging an underassessed value for Washington's property had anything to do with their nemesis relationship:

If somebody has done something that I perceive is wrong, are they then immune from me taking any appropriate action? I can't live that way. I try very hard to be even in the way that I deal with things. There are multiple entities that I've reported to the IRS, multiple entities that I've reported to the assessor as questionable nonprofit status.

On 2009 December 7 an echo of the e-mail controversies reverberated when New Orleans police chief Warren J. Riley claimed that Head had written a derogatory e-mail about him. He had apparently trashed the e-mail and was unable to retrieve it when questioned at a press conference.

== Recall drive ==
Councilmember Head faced a recall petition in late 2008 continuing into 2009, ostensibly for not representing the African American community and then for her support of Republican candidate Anh "Joseph" Cao, in his successful 2008 challenge to incumbent Democratic U.S. Representative William J. Jefferson, considered Gill Pratt's ally or even mentor. Two days (on 2009 December 8) after Cao's victory, WDSU-TV carried a statement by Mayor Nagin that Head had made "race-baiting" comments. The vitriolic quality of the environment had already been evident in allegations on a left-wing web site dubbing Head a "notorious racist and poor people hater" as well as a "partner in evil" with fellow Council member James Carter, an African American. The recall petition officially began on 2008 November 3, when recall leader Malcolm Suber formed, for the purpose, an organization calling itself Citizens for Accountability and Transparency in Government (CATG). On 2009 March 9, a week after the petition garnered the support of the Southern Christian Leadership Conference, Suber claimed to have collected over half the requisite signatures, despite protests from African American constituents who defended Head on WDSU-TV New Orleans Channel 6 (NBC). James Gill, Times-Picayune essayist, lampooned the situation with a column titled "Of all the accusations against Stacy Head, only one sticks—she's white" (Suber is black; Cao is Vietnamese American). Head dismissed the leaders of the petition to recall her as "poverty pimps" pursuing their own agendas. Political scientist Ed Chervenak described the recall effort as the "opening shot in an anybody-but-Head councilmanic campaign" to emerge in Summer 2009. Head at first declined to indicate her reelection plans or lack of them but soon, and generally, indicated to WDSU-TV and WIST-Radio New Orleans AM 690 (Fox News Radio) her intention to be a candidate for 2010 reelection. The recall drive failed to produce the required 18,000 signatures within 180 days. Head had this to say about the leaders of the recall:

Given the momentum that reform and progressive politics has [sic] had recently, they are, I'm sure, having trouble dealing with their obsolescence. . . . This is a last-ditch effort to maintain relevance.

As of 2009 July 23, no challenger had "stepped up" explicitly. Head was reelected on 2010 February 6 with 67 percent (10132 votes) to 33 percent (5021) for Corey Watson, an electrical engineer and minister whose father had founded New Orleans' Watson Memorial United Ministries.

Head subsequently endorsed Cao in his 2010 reelection campaign in which he was challenged by Democrat Cedric Richmond.

== Mayor's outlook and Jefferson factor ==
In a mid-March 2009 interview on WVUE-TV New Orleans Channel 8 (Fox), Nagin said, with regard to the councilmembers' e-mail messages, that White had "followed the policy"; Nagin declined, however, to rule out disciplinary action in either White's case or that of the city's Chief Technology Officer, Harrison Boyd, who supplied the e-mail messages to her. But simultaneously, in another proceeding, Nagin had been defending his own e-mails from disclosure, whereupon Times-Picayune columnist Stephanie Grace accused him of "inconsistency" and noted a similar behavior with respect to New Orleans Katrina-recovery czar Ed Blakely; Grace wrote:

The fact that many of the mayor's records had been purged didn't come to light until WWL went to court. In a separate suit . . . outgoing Recovery Director Ed Blakely said in an affidavit that he deleted most of his e-mails after being told that his inbox had exceeded its space limit. The message came two months after the [Times-Picayune] newspaper requested the records.

On 2009 May 22, James Gill posited a network of individuals tied to former congressman Jefferson (whom Mayor Nagin had endorsed for reelection) as out to get Head's head. Gill noted that Gill Pratt had been Jefferson's aide when Jefferson served two terms in the Louisiana Senate a generation earlier, from which position she advanced to the state House of Representatives and then to the New Orleans City Council, all the while, according to Gill, steering "vast sums of money to non-profits established by Jefferson's brother, Mose Jefferson, and his sister, Property Tax Assessor Betty Jefferson"; then "the Jeffersons just helped themselves to the money" until Mose was "charged with bribing" the Orleans Parish School Board. Head was a fly in the Jeffersons' ointment as she upended Gill Pratt from reelection to the City Council. Renée Gill Pratt, the columnist said, was at the "Celebration of Service" staged for Jefferson two weeks prior to the start of his 2009 June 2 trial on 16 felony counts. As Gill Pratt—after Head defeated her for reelection—was appointed director of one of the Jeffersons' non-profits, Tracie Washington came on the scene, organizing a "Justice for Jefferson Steering Committee" in which she, as chairwoman, said that the "Machiavellian twisting of Karl Rove and his Brownshirts" had been directed, in league with the press, at Jefferson as victim. Head provided additional effrontery by endorsing Joseph Cao, the Republican who ousted Jefferson from Congress. On 2009 August 5, virtually 7 months after the day when Cao defeated him, William J. Jefferson was convicted on 11 felony counts; two weeks later Mose Jefferson was convicted on four counts involving bribery.

In the meantime Head had continued assaulting the garbage-collection fees, on 2009 July 30 proposing to eliminate general-fund subsidies to the fees so that residents, irrespective of neighborhood, would face the actual costs on their bills. Councilwoman Cynthia Hedge-Morrell countered that "I don't think that will pass" whereupon Head responded:

We always want to get something for nothing in government. . . ; our job . . . is to get people to the harsh reality that we have to pay for services.

== S&WB controversy ==
In 2012 Head sought election to an at-large seat on the New Orleans City Council. As a member of the city's Sewerage and Water Board (S&WB), she had information on subsidized rates charged to public entities such as firehouses and asserted that the lower rates cause some of the public entities to waste water at the expense of other subscribers. She alleged situations of water use by public entities which were really required to be free under state law.

== Representative at-large ==
After besting Cynthia Willard-Lewis for the at-large seat, Head soon attracted the ire of council members Jon D. Johnson and Cynthia Hedge-Morrell for announcing plans by Big Lots to open a store in New Orleans East (an earlier Big Lots store there closed after Hurricane Katrina in 2005). Hedge-Morrell asserted that the announcement should have been made by Johnson, in whose district the store was to go, or jointly by Johnson and Head. Johnson said that he had delayed making an announcement because Big Lots' plans were still unconcluded. Another perception of the situation was that Head was merely repaying in kind the votes by Johnson and Willard-Lewis to block Head's nomination of Errol George to replace Head in the District B seat, which instead went to Diana Bajoie.

== Personal life ==
Head is married to accountant Jeremy Thomas Head, and the couple have two children. The family attends Trinity Episcopal Church. As a teenager she was chosen queen of the Oyster Festival in Amite, the parish seat of Tangipahoa Parish.

== Election history ==
Councilmember, New Orleans District B, 2006

Threshold > 50%

First Ballot, 2006 April 22

Candidate	Affiliation	Support	Outcome
Renée Gill Pratt	Democratic	7,042 (40%)	Runoff
Stacy Head	Democratic	6,691 (38%)	Runoff
Others	n.a.	3,893 (22%)	Defeated

Second Ballot, 2006 May 20

Candidate	Affiliation	Support	Outcome
Stacy Head	Democratic	10,214 (54%)	Elected
Renée Gill Pratt	Democratic	8,694 (46%)	Defeated

First Ballot, 2012 March 24

Candidate	Affiliation	Support	Outcome
Austin Badon	Democratic	7893 (18.27%)	Defeated
William "Poppa" Gant	No party	367 (0.85%)	Defeated
Andrew Gressett	Republican	825 (1.91%)	Defeated
Stacy Head	Democratic	18468 (42.76%)	Advanced to runoff
Gary Coldewy Landrieu	Democratic	720 (1.67%)	Defeated
Norbert Rome	No party	207 (0.48%)	Defeated
Cynthia Willard-Lewis	Democratic	14713 (34.06%)	Advanced to runoff

Second Ballot, 2012 April 21

Candidate	Affiliation	Support	Outcome
Stacy Head	Democratic	27,787 (50.25%)	Elected
Cynthia Willard-Lewis	Democratic	27,506 (49.75%)	Defeated

== See also ==
- Anh "Joseph" Cao
- Jacquelyn Brechtel Clarkson
- Cheryl A. Gray Evans
- William J. Jefferson
- Helena Moreno
- Rosalind Peychaud
- Jim Singleton
- Cynthia Willard-Lewis
