= Brod Bagert =

American writer

- Born: Broderick Bagert; 1947 (age 78–79); New Orleans, Louisiana, US
- Education: Loyola University
- Occupation: Children's poet

Brod Bagert (born 1947) is a children's poet from New Orleans. He has written 19 books of poetry for children, young-adults, and adults. His work has received numerous awards including the International Reading Association's prestigious Young Adults Choices award, the Association of Educational Publishers Distinguished Achievement Award, the Independent Publisher Gold Book Award, and Mom's Choices Gold Medal. He lives in New Orleans with his wife Debby; they have four children.

== History ==
Bagert was born and raised in New Orleans. In high school, he studied classical literature in the original Latin and Greek, wrestled and boxed. Bagert attended Loyola University in New Orleans for both undergraduate and law school, from which, in 1971, he received his Juris Doctor.

Bagert practiced as a trial attorney in Louisiana from 1971 to 1992, and served as an elected official from 1976 to 1980. In the summer of 1992, Bagert decided to leave his law practice to become a full-time, professional poet.

== Pre-poetry career ==
Bagert was elected to the New Orleans City Council in 1976 for a partial term representing District D, and was subsequently re-elected to a full term in 1977. While serving as Councilman, Bagert introduced legislation to designate Esplanade Avenue and a large portion of the New Orleans area referred to as the Treme as a historic district. As Councilman, Bagert helped create the New Orleans Home Mortgage Authority and shepherded the issuance of $85-million in single-family mortgage revenue bonds to fund loans for low to moderate income, first-time home owners.

In October 1980, Bagert left the City Council to accept an appointment to the Louisiana Public Service Commission.

After leaving political office, Bagert remained active in utility-related consumer issues. He pursued litigation against Louisiana Power & Light (LP&L) for the return of $1.9 billion in fuel cost adjustment overpayments. He also became one of the lead proponents for the acquisition by the City of New Orleans Public Service Inc. (NOPSI), in a long dispute over the introduction of the cost of the Grand Gulf Nuclear Station into the rate structure applicable to New Orleans ratepayers.

== Poetry career ==
Bagert's life as a children's author began when his eight-year-old daughter asked him to write a poem for her to perform in her school elocution program. To make the poem more performance friendly he wrote it in his daughter's voice, the voice of an eight-year-old girl. That was the beginning of what would eventually become one of the identifying characteristics of Bagert's poetry: poems are written in the voice of the audience for whom the poetry is intended. In a poem for kindergartners, he writes in the voice of a kindergartner. In a poem for sixth-graders, he writes in the voice of a sixth-grader. The result is a body of performance-friendly poetry in which children hear their own voices, engage their own thoughts, and discover their own innermost feelings.

== Books ==
Title	Year Published	ISBN	Publisher
If Only I Could Fly: Poems for Kids to Read Out Loud	1984	ISBN 978-0961422806	Juliahouse Publishing Company
Alaska: Twenty Poems and a Journal	1988	ISBN 978-0961422837	Juliahouse Publishing Company
Chicken Socks: And Other Contagious Poems	1993	ISBN 978-1563978616	Boyds Mill Press
Helping Your Child Learn to Read: With Activities for Children from Infancy Through Age 10	1993	ISBN 978-0669376722	U.S. Department of Education, Office of Education Research and Improvement
Let Me Be... The Boss	1995	ISBN 978-1563975240	Boyds Mills Press
Poetry for Young People: Edgar Allan Poe	1995	ISBN 978-0806908205	Sterling Publishing
Throw Me Somethin’ Mistuh!	1995	ISBN 978-1887746021	Juliahouse Publishing Company
Rainbows, Head Lice, and Pea-Green Tile: Poems in the Voice of the Classroom Teacher	1999	ISBN 978-0929895284	Maupin House Publishing
Elephant Games: And Other Playful Poems to Perform	1995	ISBN 978-1563978623	Boyds Mill Press
The Gooch Machine: Poems for Children to Perform	2004	ISBN 978-1590783153	Boyds Mill Press
Giant Children	2005	ISBN 978-0142401927	Puffin Books
Hormone Jungle: Coming of Age in Middle School	2006	ISBN 978-0929895871	Maupin House Publishing
Shout! Little Poems That Roar	2007	12359887978-0803729728	Dial Books for Young Readers
School Fever	2008	ISBN 978-0803732018	Dial Books for Young Readers
Steel Cables	2008	ISBN 978-1934338155	Maupin House Publishing
A Bullfrog at Cafe Du Monde	2008	ISBN 978-1934338179	Maupin House Publishing
The Poet and the Professor: Poems for Building Reading Skills, Grade Level 4	2010	ISBN 978-1425802387	Shell Educational Publishing
The Poet and the Professor: Poems for Building Reading Skills, Grade Level 5	2010	ISBN 978-1425802394	Shell Educational Publishing
The Poet and the Professor: Poems for Building Reading Skills, Grade Levels 6-8	2010	ISBN 978-1425802400	Shell Educational Publishing
