= James Gill (columnist) =

American satirist

James Gill (born c. 1942) is a writer and a columnist from the United Kingdom.

Born in Hertfordshire and growing up in Essex, Gill emigrated to the United States in 1977. He met his first wife while residing in Kentucky, researching for his second book. They then moved to New Orleans, Louisiana inspired by Gill’s passion for jazz.

Gill worked for the Times-Picayune, in New Orleans, before joining the staff of The Advocate. He has written books about the Mardi Gras celebration.

Like John Maginnis and Jeff Crouere, Gill has made a career of lampooning Louisiana political figures. When he does go after public officials in other states or nations, he often compares them to public figures in Louisiana. Gill has a loyal readership in the circulation area of the Times-Picayune.

One of Gill's major topics in late 2008 and early 2009 was U.S. Representative Joseph Cao, who ousted indicted incumbent William J. Jefferson in Louisiana's 2nd congressional district—and related issues such as the New Orleans e-mail controversies and repercussions related to City Councilwoman Stacy Head. In April 2009, Gill championed of the use of unstaffed cameras to photograph and ticket motorists who ignore red lights.

Gill is the author of several books. His first book, published in 1975, is titled Racecourses of Great Britain, and contains insight into many of the horse racing grounds in the country. His second focused on the topic of breeding horses and is called Bloodstock: Breeding Winners in Europe and America, published in 1977. Published in 1997, his Lords of Misrule: Mardi Gras and the Politics of Race in New Orleans was the first book to examine the role of Mardi Gras in New Orleans' political and social development as well as the first to analyze racial segregation in the krewes, which produce the annual parades.
