= Victor Ukpolo =

American economist

Victor O. Ukpolo
- Born: 1950 (age 75–76); Lagos, Nigeria
- Education: University of Maryland, College Park (B.A.); American University (M.A., Ph.D.)

Victor O. Ukpolo (born 1950 in Lagos, Nigeria) is the former Chancellor of Southern University at New Orleans.

Ukpolo is most known for his efforts in restoring SUNO to operation after Hurricane Katrina, specifically his role in obtaining funds for SUNO's recovery, including $44 million for student housing, $32 million for classroom buildings, and various grants for other academic purposes. In 2012 the Carnegie Corporation selected Ukpolo as one of 45 naturalized citizens of the United States for Carnegie's Americans by Choice award.)

== Modest beginnings ==
Ukpolo came to the United States at age 23 as a student at the University of Maryland at College Park from which he received his bachelor's degree. To finance his education, he worked in a restaurant washing dishes and drove taxicabs in the District of Columbia. He received his master's degree and Ph.D. from American University in the nation's capital. From there he steadily climbed through various assignments and challenges to the chancellorship at SUNO. He is thought to be the first native-born Nigerian to head a university in the United States.

== Administrative background ==
Ukpolo's academic-administrative posts before becoming SUNO's seventh chancellor were in California and Tennessee. An economist, Ukpolo serves on the American Association of State Colleges and Universities’ Committee on Economic and Workforce Development.

== Katrina aftermath ==
At SUNO, Ukpolo has demonstrated a knack for working with various types of people, his name being frequently in the news in the Greater New Orleans Area because of his efforts to remedy the damage to SUNO's campus by Hurricane Katrina. His efforts to rebuild included his leading a group of prominent local, state, and federal officials on a tour of the campus. The Times-Picayune, in an editorial on 2009 March 19, praised Ukpolo and U.S. Representative Joseph Cao in their efforts to secure funding for restoration of SUNO's campus. Ukpolo also sought to protect the jobs of up to 50 employees who would be laid off if SUNO had to accommodate a $3 million reduction in state appropriation amid the economic downturn in 2009. Amid tough decisions Ukpolo can be counted on to do "the right thing for SUNO" according to Tony Clayton, chair of the Board of Supervisors for the Southern University System.

As newly instituted standards for admission of students raised the expectations on new students, in 2011 SUNO successfully resisted efforts to merge with the nearby University of New Orleans. Early in 2012 Ukpolo continued to seek restoration of 13 remaining buildings rendered unusable by Katrina. He embarked on plans to recruit more students on an international basis.

== Personal life ==
Ukpolo is married to Dr Fawn Teresa Ukpolo (born 1963), who served as director of the Laboratory School at Southeastern Louisiana University from 2006 to 2013 before becoming director of the doctoral program in executive leadership at Our Lady of the Lake College in Baton Rouge. The couple has three children.
