= Johnny Jackson Jr. =

American politician (1943–2018)

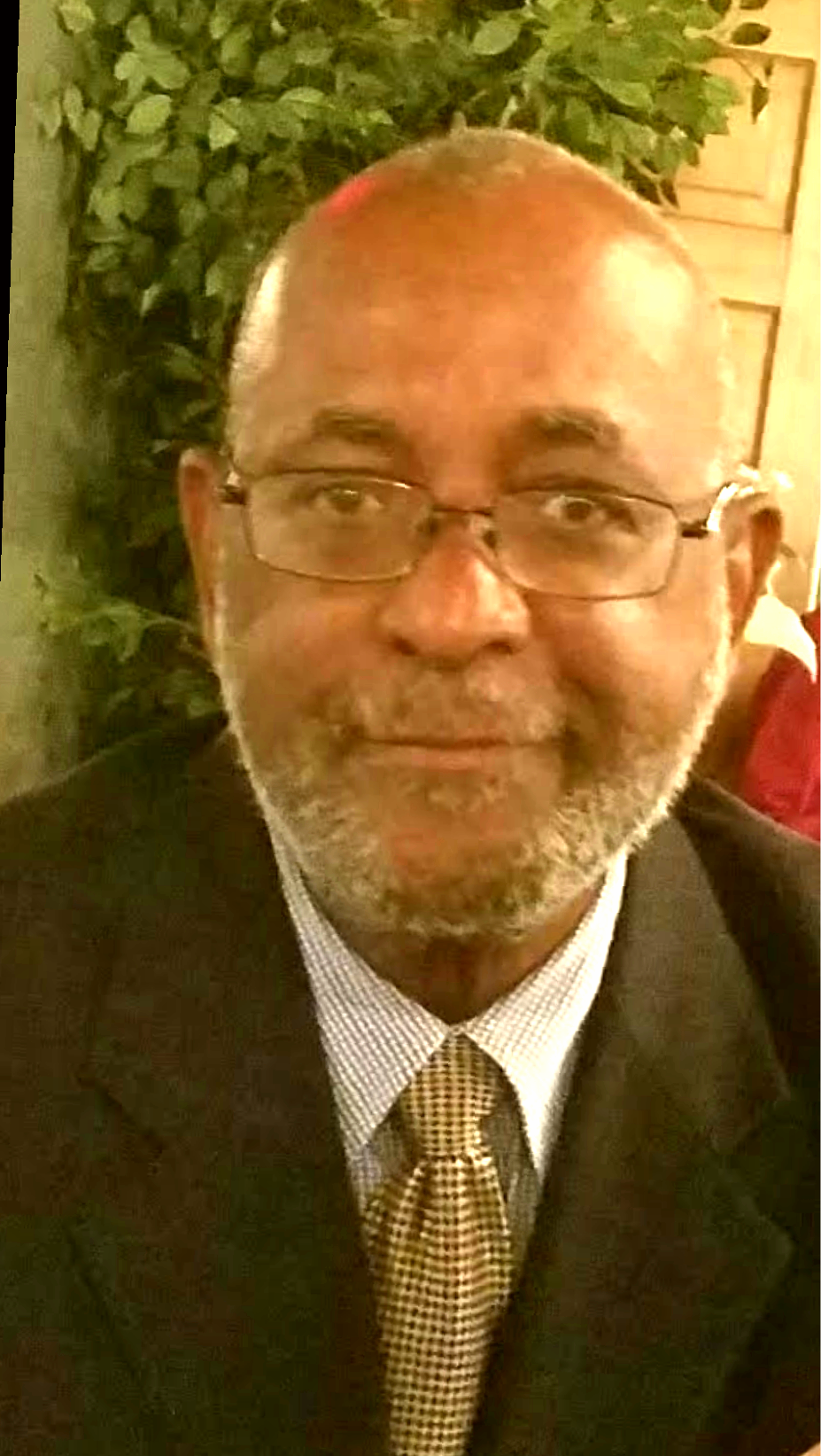
- Jackson in 2017

Member of the New Orleans City Council
- In office May 1986 – May 1994

Member of the Louisiana House of Representatives from the 101st district
- In office 1971–1985

Personal details
- Born: September 19, 1943 New Orleans, Louisiana, U.S.
- Died: January 24, 2018 (aged 74)
- Cause of death: Colon cancer
- Party: Democratic
- Spouse: Ara Jean Jackson
- Education: Tulane University; Southern University
- Occupation: politician

Johnny Jackson Jr. (September 19, 1943 – January 24, 2018) was an American politician, who served as a Louisiana State Representative, for district 101, between the years of 1971 and 1985, and a New Orleans City Councilman, for District E, between 1986 and 1994.

Johnny Jackson Jr. was born September 19, 1943, at Charity Hospital in New Orleans, LA. He was the oldest son of Josephine Brown Jackson and Johnny Jackson, Sr., whereby he had three(3) brothers and two(2) sisters, by the names of Bruce, Brandon, Cynthia, Cheryl and Kevin. After he graduated from George W. Carver Senior High in 1961, he went on to earn his bachelor's degree from Southern University in New Orleans by 1965, and his master's degree in Social Work from Tulane University by 1980.

In 1968, Johnny Jackson Jr. was appointed as the director of the Desire Community Center. The center provided young people with breakfast, tutoring, and mentoring programs, all supported by volunteers of the Black Panther Party. This was during the 1970 standoff between the Black Panther Party and the New Orleans Police Department.

From there, leaders of the political organization SOUL recruited him to run for the Louisiana State Legislature. When elected to represent District 101 in 1971, he was the Legislature's third African-American member. Soon after his election, Johnny became the New Orleans delegation's floor leader and he was a founding member of the state's Legislative Black Caucus. He served on the Louisiana State Legislature for 14 years. In 1986, Johnny Jackson was elected to the New Orleans City Council where he served for 8 years (two terms) due to term limitations.

On the city council, Johnny headed the housing committee. He also drafted legislation aimed at ensuring equal treatment of the city's gay and lesbian communities.

Johnny was a board member of Total Community Action Inc., New Orleans East Economic Development Foundation, Desire-Florida Area Community Council, Development Association of Wards and Neighborhoods, New Orleans Jazz and Heritage Foundation, WWOZ, and the Zulu Social Aid and Pleasure Club.

He was married to Ara Jean Parker and together had children Kevin, Jeanne, Johnann, Kenyatta and Johnny Jahi. They adopted Samantha Spears and raised a host of other children.

Jackson died on January 24, 2018.
