= Ann Duplessis =

American politician

Ann D. Duplessis

Member of the Louisiana Senate from the 2nd district
- In office 2004 – June 27, 2010
- Succeeded by: Cynthia Willard-Lewis

Personal details
- Party: Democratic
- Spouse: Virgil Duplessis
- Occupation: Banking, financial services

Ann D. Duplessis is a Democratic former member of the Louisiana Senate for the Second District. She held the seat from 2004 to 2010, when she resigned to enter the administration of Mayor Mitch Landrieu of New Orleans.
