= Bryan Wagner =

James Bryan Wagner

District A member of the New Orleans City Council
- In office May 1980 – April 1986
- Preceded by: Frank Friedler
- Succeeded by: Peggy Wilson

Personal details
- Born: March 2, 1943 New Orleans, Louisiana, U.S.
- Died: July 29, 2018 (aged 75) Atlanta, Georgia
- Party: Republican
- Spouse: Judy White Wagner
- Children: 3
- Education: Tulane University
- Occupation: Insurance agent

James Bryan Wagner, known as Bryan Wagner (March 2, 1943 – July 29, 2018), was the first Republican since Reconstruction to be elected to the New Orleans City Council. He filled a vacancy of an unexpired term in District A from May 1980 to April 1982 and a full term until 1986.

== Background ==
Wagner attended Isidore Newman School, New Orleans Academy, and Tulane University. He operated an insurance agency on Carondelet Street in New Orleans.

In later years, Wagner became heavily involved in horse racing. He often spent summers in Del Mar, California, to be near the famed racetrack. Wagner won the 2009 National Handicapping Championship Tour, as it was then known, and qualified twelve times to the National Horseplayers Championship, during which he earned $101,000. He was part of the NHC since its founding in 1999. For two years, he could not qualify because his wife and the mother of their three children, the former Judy White (born June 9, 1950), sat on the board of directors of the National Thoroughbred Racing Association.

== Political life ==
The electoral success of Wilson, Terrell, and Batt benefited from the Republican leanings of District A.

In 2008, Wagner served as manager for the successful campaign of Joseph Cao for Louisiana's 2nd congressional district. Cao was subsequently unseated in 2010 by the Democrat Cedric Richmond, who still holds the seat.

Wagner's memorial service was held on August 6, 2018, at the chapel at Christ Church, 2919 St. Charles Avenue.

Political offices
Preceded by Frank Friedler	Member of the New Orleans City Council for District A 1980–1986	Succeeded by Peggy Wilson
