= Philip Ciaccio =

American judge and politician

Member of the Louisiana House of Representatives from the 9th district
- In office 1962–1966
- Preceded by: Daniel L. Kelly
- Succeeded by: Ernest J. Hessler Jr.

Member of the New Orleans City Council
- In office 1966–1982

Judge of the Louisiana Court Appeal for the Fourth Circuit
- In office 1982–1998

Personal details
- Born: Philip Charles Ciaccio; August 23, 1927 New Orleans, Louisiana, U.S.
- Died: November 12, 2015 (aged 88) New Orleans, Louisiana, U.S.
- Party: Democratic
- Spouse: Mary Jane Bologna
- Education: Tulane University
- Occupation: Judge

Philip Charles Ciaccio (August 23, 1927 – November 12, 2015) was an American judge and politician. A member of the Democratic Party, he served in the Louisiana House of Representatives from 1962 to 1966 and as judge of the Louisiana Court Appeal for the Fourth Circuit from 1982 to 1998.

== Life and career ==
Ciaccio was born in New Orleans, Louisiana. He attended St. Aloysius High School, graduating at the age of fifteen. After graduating, he attended Tulane University, earning his undergraduate degree in 1947 and his law degree in 1950, which after earning his degrees, he served in the United States Air Force during the Korean War.

Ciaccio served in the Louisiana House of Representatives from 1962 to 1966. After his service in the House, he then served in the New Orleans City Council from 1966 to 1982, which after his service in the City Council, he served as judge of the Louisiana Court Appeal for the Fourth Circuit from 1982 to 1998.

== Personal life and death ==
Ciaccio was married to Mary Jane Bologna. Their marriage lasted until Ciaccio's death in 2015.

Ciaccio died on November 12, 2015, in New Orleans, Louisiana, at the age of 88.
