= Joseph Cao =

Vietnamese-American activist and politician (born 1967)

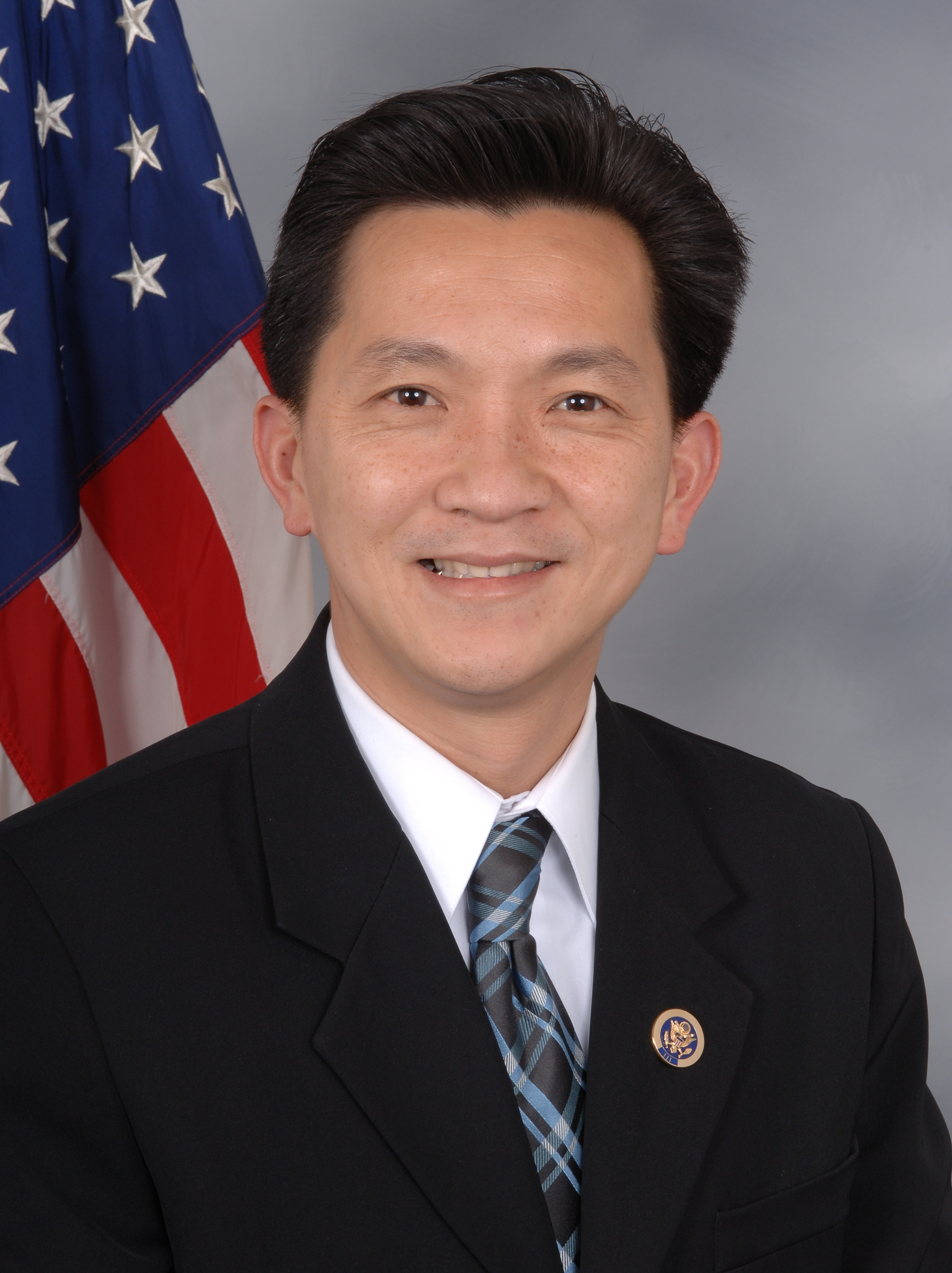
- Official portrait, 2009

Member of the Louisiana Board of Elementary and Secondary Education from the 1st district
- Incumbent
- Assumed office January 14, 2026
- Governor: Jeff Landry
- Preceded by: Paul Hollis

Member of the U.S. House of Representatives from Louisiana's 2nd district
- In office January 3, 2009 – January 3, 2011
- Preceded by: Bill Jefferson
- Succeeded by: Cedric Richmond

Personal details
- Born: Cao Quang Ánh; March 13, 1967 (age 59) Saigon, South Vietnam
- Party: Republican
- Spouse: Kate Hoang
- Children: 3
- Education: Baylor University (BS); Fordham University (MA); Loyola University New Orleans (JD)
- Website: Office website Campaign website

Ánh Quang "Joseph" Cao (/ɡaʊ/ GOW; Vietnamese: Cao Quang Ánh; born March 13, 1967) is an American politician who was the U.S. representative for Louisiana's 2nd congressional district from 2009 to 2011. A member of the Republican Party, he was the first Vietnamese American, as well as the first native of Vietnam, to serve in Congress.

Cao was the only Republican congressman to vote for the draft Obamacare, known as Patient Protection and Affordable Care Act, in November 2009.

In 2011, Cao was briefly a candidate for attorney general of Louisiana before dropping out. He later ran for U.S. Senate in 2016, but finished eleventh in the primary, not making it to the runoff.

== Early life and education ==
Ánh Quang Cao was born in Saigon, South Vietnam, in 1967 as the fifth of eight children to My Quang Cao (1930–2010), a lieutenant in the South Vietnamese Army, and Khang Thi Tran (born 1935). He was captured by the North Vietnamese Army in 1975 at the end of the Vietnam War. His mother did not immediately flee South Vietnam, but sent Anh Cao and two siblings to escape with their uncle. She stayed in the country with five of Cao's siblings. She was allowed to visit her husband only five times during the seven years he was imprisoned in a Communist "re-education camp".

In 1975 Anh Cao was eight years old when he, his siblings and his uncle arrived as refugees in the United States, where they were resettled in Houston, Texas. After being released in 1982 from prison camp, Cao's father joined his family in Houston. He suffered from post-traumatic stress disorder (PTSD) and diabetes.

Cao and his family were raised as Catholics. He studied for several years after college to become a priest. He attended public schools and graduated from Jersey Village High School in Houston. He earned a Bachelor of Science degree in physics at Baylor University in Waco, Texas. He studied as a Jesuit seminarian for six years, but withdrew when he concluded that the ministry was not his calling. He earned a Master of Arts in philosophy from Fordham University in New York City, and in 2000 his J.D. from Loyola University School of Law in New Orleans. While in law school, Cao also taught undergraduate courses in philosophy at Loyola.

== Law practice ==
Cao used his legal training and experience in immigration issues. For a period he taught at a parochial school in Virginia. He volunteered at Boat People SOS (BPSOS) to assist Vietnamese refugees and immigrants and help organize Vietnamese-American communities in the state toward self-sufficiency. He served as a board member of BPSOS from September 1996 to March 2002. After working with Waltzer & Associates, Cao opened his own law practice in New Orleans specializing in immigration law.

Dismayed by the government response to the disaster following Hurricane Katrina, Cao became more involved in politics. He soon became involved in leading New Orleans East residents to oppose a landfill in their area.

== U.S. House of Representatives ==
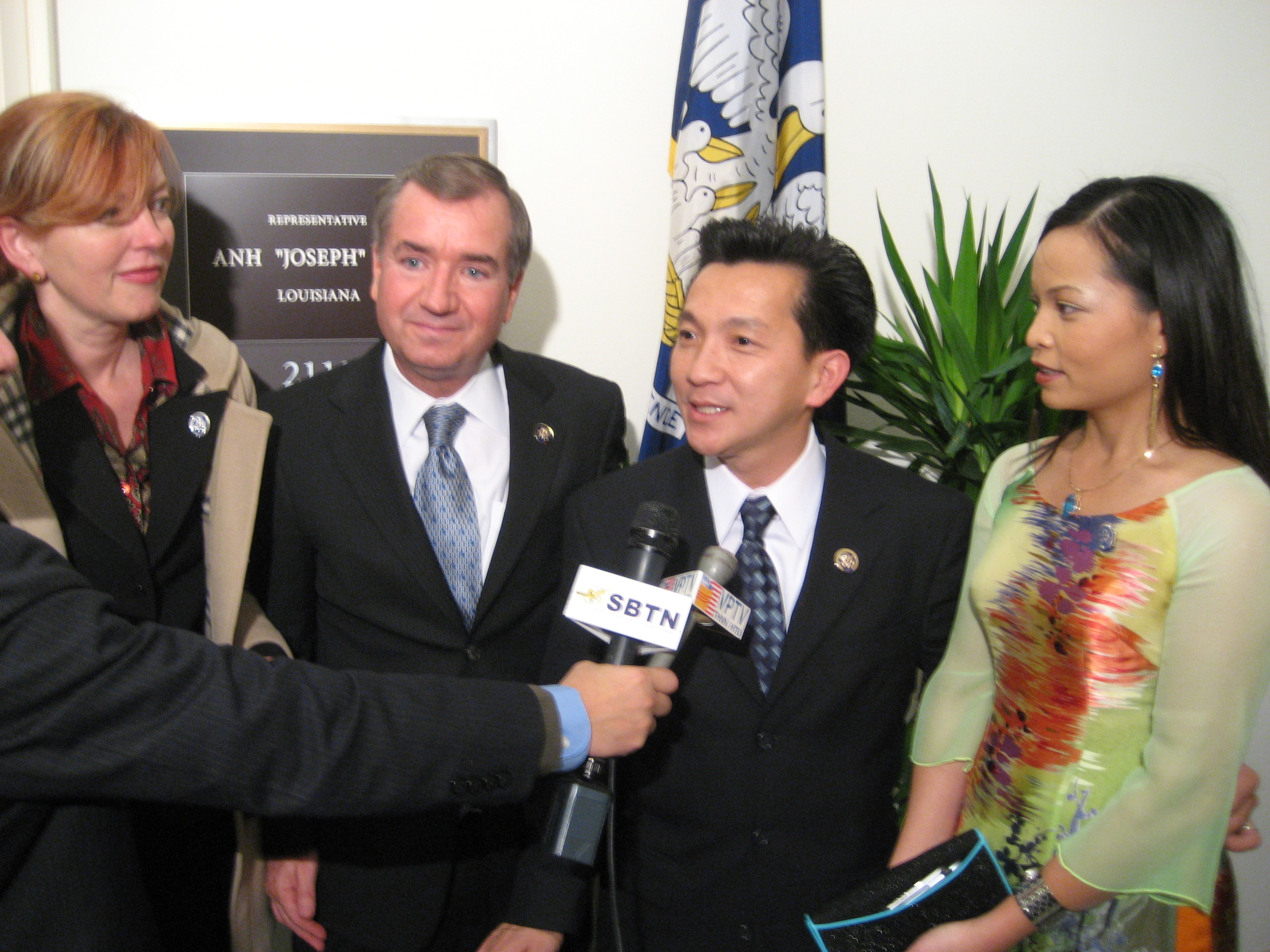
California Congressman Ed Royce and his wife welcoming newly elected Congressman Joseph Cao and his wife outside Cao's office

Cao was the first Vietnamese American, as well as the first native of Vietnam, to serve in U.S. Congress. He was the first Republican to serve in his district since 1890. He defeated a congressman who had been indicted. His district has historically voted overwhelmingly Democratic, based on two different ethnic majorities during this period.

Cao was the least affluent member of Louisiana's delegation in Congress: as of 2009 his assets were no greater than $195,000 and his potential liabilities amounted to $215,000, including student loans for himself and his wife.

Cao was sworn into office on January 6, 2009, with his family and a group of Vietnamese Americans in attendance. After the swearing-in by Speaker of the House Nancy Pelosi, Jefferson Parish Judge Robert Murphy re-administered the oath in Cao's new office.

Despite the tardiness of the election date, Cao rapidly set up his office and staff and gained committee assignments for the 111th Congress. On March 24, 2009, 11 weeks to the day after he was sworn in as a new member, Cao delivered his first speech on the House floor: his statement supported a bill by California Democrat Linda Sánchez to express congressional support of Welcome Home Vietnam Veterans Day. In the speech, which was broadcast on C-SPAN, Cao said, of Vietnam War veterans, "I am pleased that I, a direct beneficiary of their service, can take part ... in this historic event." The bill passed. Cao's speech had been written by his Legislative Director, A. Brooke Bennett.

With the support of congressional Republicans who collectively had an entitlement to 40 percent of earmarks for federal projects, Cao worked to "bring home the bacon" for his district. His requested projects totaled $1.2 billion, approximately three times the average for the other six members of Louisiana's U.S. House delegation. With the support of Louisiana's Democratic United States Senator Mary Landrieu and lobbyist and former United States Representative Bob Livingston, several of these projects were approved by Congress. Livingston represented the adjoining 1st Congressional District from 1977 to 1999.

Cao expressed interest in environmental issues, saying in a meeting at Loyola University New Orleans on April 16, 2009: "I recognize there is an issue of global warming that we have to address."

Cao was invited to a White House reception on April 23, 2009. He presented President Obama with a letter requesting $490 million for post-Katrina restoration of New Orleans' Charity Hospital. (FEMA had offered $150 million). Cao also spoke with Vice President Joe Biden regarding the recovery of New Orleans.

In June 2010, Cao was one of only two Republicans to vote in favor of the DISCLOSE Act, intended to limit spending on political campaigns by corporations in the wake of the Supreme Court's decision in Citizens United v. Federal Election Commission. The bill requires added disclosure for political spending by corporations and prohibits some corporate political spending.

In December 2010, Cao was one of fifteen Republican House members to vote in favor of repealing the United States military's "Don't Ask, Don't Tell" ban on openly gay service members.

According to a 2011 survey by the National Journal, Cao was the most liberal Republican in the House. In 2009, he was one of seven Republicans who voted to publicly rebuke Representative Joe Wilson, Republican of South Carolina, for his outburst of "You lie!" against President Obama during an address before a joint session of Congress.

=== Office ===
Cao hired former state representative Rosalind Peychaud, a Democrat, as his deputy chief of staff.

The late date of Cao's election meant that he inherited former Congressman William J. Jefferson's office, 2113, in the Rayburn House Office Building, although he had no seniority in the House. Writing in the Times-Picayune, Jonathan Tilove observed the notability of 2113 in the Rayburn Building due to its being, as Jefferson's former location, the only congressional office ever raided by the FBI. By the middle of February 2009, Cao had hired most of his staff.

In April 2009, Cao's district staff moved into what was described as the first office in Kenner for a sitting congressman. The office was formerly a storeroom in Kenner's Community Services Department at 624 Williams Boulevard (LA 49).

=== Committee assignments ===
After confirmation by the House Republican Conference, Cao was assigned to the Homeland Security Committee and the Transportation and Infrastructure Committee.

- Committee on Homeland Security
  - Subcommittee on Emergency Communications, Preparedness, and Response
  - Subcommittee on Management, Investigations, and Oversight
- Committee on Transportation and Infrastructure
  - Subcommittee on Economic Development, Public Buildings and Emergency Management
  - Subcommittee on Railroads, Pipelines, and Hazardous Materials
- Committee on Oversight and Government Reform
  - Subcommittee on Federal Workforce, Post Office, and the District of Columbia

=== Caucuses ===
- Congressional Asian Pacific American Caucus
- American Engagement Caucus

=== Interest in Congressional Black Caucus ===
From the outset of Cao's congressional service, his relationship to the Congressional Black Caucus remained uncertain. George Mason University political scientist Michael K. Fauntroy described Cao's expressed interest in joining as "a very smart move".

It sends a message to black voters in his district that, even though he's a Republican, he is doing more than just paying lip service to the history of the district ... I don't expect it to work out, but if it doesn't, to me the caucus will look bad on this.

However, Cao was "rebuffed" by the Congressional Black Caucus in his attempt to join it despite representing a heavily black district.

Cao told the Times-Picayune that President Obama should receive a letter grade of "A" for his first 100 days in office. Cao cited as his reason for such a high mark Obama's "working with us in this whole recovery process" (in reference to Hurricane Katrina).

=== Recall drive ===
Among the bills which came to the floor during Cao's first days in Congress, Cao voted against the Obama Administration's stimulus package. Cao justified his votes on expressed dissatisfaction that his 2nd congressional district of Louisiana ranked dead last among the 435 congressional districts in outlays provided by the legislation even though the district was one of the most seriously damaged by hurricanes. Cao's vote provoked a petition to recall him, which formally began on February 16, 2009. Louisiana Secretary of State Jay Dardenne and other Louisiana officials, as well as congressional analysts, perceived it as having little or no prospect of succeeding. Although the petition collected more than 13,000 signatures on the first day, it needed more than 100,000 within 180 days to fulfill Louisiana requirements. Congress has never removed, and has no constitutional provision to do, a member based on constituents' recall. Several leaders of the recall campaign, specifically the Reverends Samuel Butler and Toris Young, claimed to have been supporters of Cao, though Cao and his campaign manager Bryan Wagner, a former member of the New Orleans City Council, said they had never met them. After Louisiana Attorney General Buddy Caldwell issued an opinion that the state cannot recall federal officials, Butler and Young announced that they would pursue the matter in the federal courts. Young's ability to criticize Cao was mocked by Times-Picayune columnist James Gill because of Young's 11 convictions for fraud and identity theft.

On March 1, 2009, the Times-Picayune reported that Obama had tried to reach Cao on his cellphone prior to the vote on the stimulus package but was unsuccessful; Cao acknowledged that Obama "might have been persuasive" with a "concrete commitment" to help the 2nd district and New Orleans. Cao stated that the Obama administration's $410 billion omnibus spending bill for the final 7 months of Fiscal Year 2009 (ending September 30, 2009) "would provide important benefits for his 2nd Congressional District" and became one of 16 Republicans voting in favor of that bill.

Before the recall petition, a separate petition had been started to recall New Orleans City Councilwoman Stacy Head, who is white but represents a predominantly black constituency after defeating Jefferson protégé Renée Gill Pratt in 2006. Head, a Democrat, supported Cao in the election on December 6, 2008. James Gill defended Head's support for Cao (who is not white but Asian) and asserted it was based not on race but that "Jefferson ... is morally unfit for any public office." The petition to recall Head failed to meet its statutory deadline.

=== FEMA critic ===
On February 25, 2009, Cao grabbed headlines by announcing that his staff members were investigating the Federal Emergency Management Agency (FEMA) office in New Orleans. Cao, whose aversive relationship with the agency had started during his time as a community activist for victims of Hurricane Katrina, accused FEMA of a host of malfeasance charges, including "widespread complaints of discrimination, sexual harassment, ethics violations, nepotism and cronyism." Cao conveyed his concerns to the Obama administration's Homeland Security Secretary Janet Napolitano, who promised that "we will obviously follow up." The next day Cao's call for the resignation of Doug Whitmer, head of FEMA's New Orleans office, was bolstered by United States Senator Mary Landrieu, whereupon the story spread on CBS News. Popular reaction quickly pervaded New Orleans blogsites, one of them calling its discussion FEMA having a Cao. On February 27, 2009, acting FEMA Director Nancy L. Ward replaced Whitmer with Tony Russell, previously an administrator in FEMA's Denver office. Ward stripped Jim Stark of his immediate responsibilities for Louisiana's FEMA district, leaving him as FEMA assistant administrator for Gulf Coast recovery. Cao had also been critical of John Connolly, FEMA chief for Gulf Coast public assistance, whom Stark cited as his source of information on "how much public-assistance money FEMA should approve for local projects" (in a congressional hearing with Cao on February 25, 2009). Connolly was previously with FEMA's Philadelphia office, and Cao asked rhetorically, "How many times has Philadelphia been hit by a hurricane?" On March 5, 2009, Cao joined Napolitano, Jindal, Housing and Urban Development Secretary Shaun Donovan, Louisiana Lieutenant Governor Mitch Landrieu, U.S. Representative Charlie Melancon, and other federal, state, and local officials on a tour of damaged areas in New Orleans, including the campus of Southern University at New Orleans (SUNO), where the group was led by SUNO President Victor Ukpolo. Eleven days later, on March 16, Cao again visited the SUNO campus, pledging full support of Ukpolo's mission to rebuild the campus. The segueing event on Cao's agenda during the same day was a fund-raising cocktail party at the home of bankers Stephen and Dana Hansel at which the admission contribution was $1000 a person and an unexpected guest was former Speaker of the House Newt Gingrich who was en route to lead a discussion in James Carville's political science class at Tulane University. The Times-Picayune, in an editorial on March 19, 2009, praised Ukpolo and Cao in their efforts to secure funding for restoration of SUNO's campus.

=== Formation of American Engagement Caucus ===
In January 2010, Cao partnered with Democratic Congressman Russ Carnahan of Missouri to create the American Engagement Caucus, its stated purpose being the promotion of a multilateral foreign policy in which the United States works closely with other countries to address global problems. As a joint editorial between the two congressmen stated, "We live in an age of interdependence. America's security, economic, environmental, and moral interests are inextricably linked with those of the international community. Simply put, it is in our vital national interest to support international engagement."

=== Health care ===
Cao was the only Republican to vote for the draft Affordable Health Care for America Act (H.R. 3962) on November 7, 2009. Yet Cao, because of concerns of alleged public funding for elective abortion provisions, joined the rest of his party in opposing the final version, the Patient Protection and Affordable Care Act.

== Political campaigns ==
=== 2006 ===
Cao ran unsuccessfully as an independent for District 103 of the Louisiana House of Representatives. He was a delegate to the 2008 Republican National Convention during Hurricane Gustav, during which time his home was flooded. At the time of his election to Congress, Cao was a member of the Orleans Parish Board of Election Supervisors, appointed to the Board by Governor Bobby Jindal.

=== 2008 ===
The situation, endorsements, campaign dynamics, and results gave the election significance far beyond the boundaries of the district.

Incumbent U.S. Representative William J. Jefferson won the Democratic primaries in 2008. Jefferson had weathered a major challenge in the Louisiana 2nd congressional district election, 2006, overcoming allegations that he had inappropriately used members of a Louisiana Army National Guard unit to reach his home during the aftermath of Hurricane Katrina.

In 2008 Jefferson also faced federal charges of bribery involving Nigerian business interests and was perceived as vulnerable, with only 25 percent of Democrats voting for him in the Democratic primary. Jefferson faced six African-American challengers, along with newscaster Helena Moreno. In a runoff primary, Jefferson defeated Moreno by 57 percent to 43 percent in a vote largely along racial lines. Unopposed for the Republican nomination, Cao ran against Jefferson, as did Green Party candidate Malik Rahim and Libertarian Party candidate Gregory Kahn. An earlier candidate, independent Jerry Jacobs, had withdrawn.

==== Endorsements ====
On November 30, the New Orleans Times-Picayune endorsed Cao in an editorial, while on its op-ed page columnist James Gill stated that Jefferson's reelection "is not going to happen". The prospect of a serious general election in the heavily African-American and Democratic 2nd district was startling, as the last Republican to represent the district was Hamilton D. Coleman, who left office in 1891.

Cao's candidacy received the endorsements of the Alliance for Good Government, the Family Research Council's Action PAC, Jefferson Parish Sheriff Newell Normand, Louisiana Governor Bobby Jindal, Jacquelyn Brechtel Clarkson, Stacy Head, and singer/entertainer Pat Boone. In the final days of the campaign, Democrats Helena Moreno, who was defeated by Jefferson in the Democratic primary runoff election, and former District Attorney Harry Connick Sr. endorsed Cao and recorded telephone messages to be played to voters. New Orleans Mayor Ray Nagin announced his support for Jefferson during the Democratic primary elections. The New Orleans Gambit Weekly, citing its opposition to Jefferson's alleged corruption and to Cao's noncommittal statements on embryonic stem-cell research, made no endorsement.

==== Campaign ====
At first, Jefferson, as indicated by The New York Times on the day after his winning the Democratic nomination, was "heavily favored" to win against any Republican challenger.

The campaign was characterized by what Jefferson's campaign called "overly negative" tactics on behalf of Cao's campaign by outside organizations, such as the National Republican Congressional Committee. References were made to Democratic Speaker of the House Nancy Pelosi's removal of Jefferson from the House Ways and Means Committee and entailed what USA Today termed a "barrage" of automated telephone calls, including from a woman who identified herself as "Katy" and who cited Jefferson's federal indictment on 16 counts of corruption. In a meeting of African-American ministers, Reverend Samuel Butler claimed the reason was to "disenfranchise" African-American voters, which motivated Cao advisor and political mentor, former New Orleans City Council member Bryan Wagner to reply: "with Rev. Butler's imagination, he may want to go to work for Walt Disney."

On December 6, the Times-Picayune reiterated its endorsement of Cao, pointing to President-elect Barack Obama's efforts on behalf of Democrat Paul Carmouche in the simultaneous election in Louisiana's 4th congressional district and Obama's non-involvement in efforts to support Jefferson.

==== Results ====
Unofficial results on the Louisiana Secretary of State's web site showed Cao with 33,122 (49.55%), Jefferson 31,296 (46.82%), Kahn 548 (0.82%), and Rahim 1,880 (2.81%). Jefferson won by 23,197 to 20,246 in Orleans Parish, where 21 of the 392 precincts showed zero votes for Cao. Cao, however, more than made up the difference with a margin of 12,696 to the incumbent's 8,099 in Jefferson Parish. A post-election map analysis by the Times-Picayune showed the election result as having depended on higher turnout in the precincts favorable to Cao.

After speaking by telephone four days after the election, on December 31, 2008, Wednesday, Jefferson and Cao met cordially at the home of New Orleans' Liberty Bank CEO Alden McDonald to discuss the transition.

==== Significance ====
Politico.com declared Cao's victory one of America's "Top 10 Political Upsets" of 2008.

Cao became the first Vietnamese American elected to Congress. Cao's win made the 2nd District by far the most Democratic district in the nation to be represented by a Republican; the district has a Cook Partisan Voting Index of D+28. Obama carried the district with 74 percent of the vote, his 35th-best performance in the country and his fifth best in a Southern district.

Cao's victory over a tainted incumbent became a cause for celebration among many in Louisiana. Wrote Jeff Crouere in his column Ringside Politics, "The victory strikes a major blow against the reputation of Louisiana as a corrupt state".

House GOP members were particularly vocal in their glee over Cao's defeat of the Democratic incumbent. Among many other statements, House minority leader John Boehner asserted Cao's win was "a symbol of our future" in a memorandum with "The Future Is Cao" as its subject line.

=== 2010 ===
Cao was thought to face nearly impossible odds for reelection due to the district's overwhelmingly Democratic nature. Indeed, many pundits likened him to Michael Patrick Flanagan, a former Republican congressman from Illinois. Flanagan ousted scandal-plagued House Ways and Means Committee chairman Dan Rostenkowski in 1994, only to be roundly defeated for reelection after one term in his heavily Democratic Chicago-based district by future Illinois Governor Rod Blagojevich.

As expected, Cao lost his reelection bid in a landslide to Democratic State Representative Cedric Richmond, an African American. Other candidates included Independents Ron Austin, Anthony K. Marquize, and Jack Radosta. Cao had the support of several of New Orleans' prominent Democrats, including Councilwoman Stacy Head, Assessor Erroll Williams, and State Representative Juan LaFonta (who had lost the Democratic Party's nomination to Richmond), but the vote fell on racial lines. He was one of only two Republican House incumbents to lose reelection in 2010.

=== 2016 ===
In December 2015, Cao announced that he would run for the open U.S. Senate seat being vacated by retiring fellow Republican David Vitter in 2016. Cao finished eleventh in the primary, meaning he did not place high enough to advance to the general election.

== Political positions ==
Cao is considered a moderate Republican. He has been described as "progressive" on issues such as immigration reform, gay rights, and government services for the poor, while being very anti-abortion and conservative on fiscal issues. He has described himself as a "moderate, fiscally conservative Republican." The non-partisan National Journal gave him a composite score of 57% conservative and 43% liberal in 2010. The American Conservative Union, a political action committee or PAC, gave Cao a lifetime score of 42% conservative. Americans for Democratic Action, a progressive PAC, gave him a 45% liberal quotient.

He voted against President Obama's proposed stimulus package in 2009, as well as the Democratic-backed Lily Ledbetter Fair Pay Act.

He broke with his party by voting with Democrats in favor of the Affordable Health Care for America Act which included a public option for health care. However, Cao voted against the Affordable Care Act, colloquially called Obamacare, because of concerns about abortion. He had also been one of 29 Republicans who voted with Democrats in favor of the re-authorization of the Children's Health Insurance Program.

Cao was one of five House Republicans who voted with Democrats to repeal Don't Ask Don't Tell in May 2010. He was one of 15 Republicans who joined Democrats and voted in favor of the final repeal of Don't Ask Don't Tell in December 2010. In the same month, Cao was one of eight Republicans to vote for the DREAM Act, which passed the House but later failed in the Senate.

== Electoral history ==
Louisiana State Representative, 103rd Representative District, 2007

Threshold > 50%

First ballot, October 20, 2007
Candidate	Affiliation	Support	Outcome
Reed S. Henderson	Democratic	1,376 (22%)	Runoff
Mark Madary	Republican	1,188 (19%)	Runoff
"Mike" Bayham	Republican	1,154 (18%)	Defeated
Clay Cosse	Republican	1,144 (18%)	Defeated
Anh "Joseph" Cao	Independent	895 (14%)	Defeated
"Rob" Ruffino	Democratic	609 (10%)	Defeated

Second ballot, November 17, 2007
Candidate	Affiliation	Support	Outcome
Reed S. Henderson	Democratic	3,143 (52%)	Elected
Mark Madary	Republican	2,858 (48%)	Defeated

U. S. Representative, 2nd Congressional District, 2008

Candidate	Affiliation	Support	Outcome
Anh "Joseph" Cao	Republican	33,132 (50%)	Elected
Bill Jefferson	Democratic	31,318 (47%)	Defeated
Others	n.a.	2,432 (4%)	Defeated

U. S. Representative, 2nd Congressional District, 2010

Candidate	Affiliation	Support	Outcome
Cedric Richmond	Democratic	83,705 (65%)	Elected
Anh "Joseph" Cao	Republican	43,378 (33%)	Defeated
Others	n.a.	2,521 (2%)	Defeated

United States Senate election in Louisiana, 2016
Party	Candidate	Votes	%
Republican	John Kennedy	482,591	25.0
Democratic	Foster Campbell	337,833	17.5
Republican	Charles Boustany	298,008	15.4
Democratic	Caroline Fayard	240,917	12.5
Republican	John Fleming	204,026	10.6
Republican	Rob Maness	90,856	4.7
Republican	David Duke	58,606	3.0
Democratic	Derrick Edwards	51,774	2.7
Democratic	Gary Landrieu	45,587	2.4
Republican	Donald "Crawdaddy" Crawford	25,523	1.3
Republican	Joseph Cao	21,019	1.1
Independent	Other	76,895	4.0

== Documentary ==
On January 3, 2013, the Public Broadcasting Service aired the documentary Mr. Cao Goes to Washington, directed by S. Leo Chiang. The film tracks Cao's brief tenure in Washington, D.C., as the first Vietnamese American elected to Congress.

== Personal life ==
Cao is married to Hieu Phuong "Kate" Hoang. The couple has two daughters and resides in New Orleans' Venetian Isles neighborhood. Kate and Joseph met in 1998 at the Mary Queen of Vietnam Catholic Church in New Orleans East and the family has attended there since. After the 2008 election, Kate, an alumna of the Xavier University of Louisiana College of Pharmacy and a registered pharmacist, resigned from her position at a New Orleans Walgreens pharmacy.

A devout Catholic, Cao served as a board member for Mary Queen of Vietnam Catholic Church's Community Development Corporation which assists Vietnamese-Americans with hurricane relief. Cao is a member of the National Advisory Council of the U.S. Conference of Catholic Bishops.

Cao is also a member of the ReFormers Caucus of Issue One.

== See also ==
- Vietnamese in New Orleans
- List of Asian Americans and Pacific Islands Americans in the United States Congress

U.S. House of Representatives
Preceded by William J. Jefferson	Member of the U.S. House of Representatives from Louisiana's 2nd congressional district 2009–2011	Succeeded by Cedric Richmond
U.S. order of precedence (ceremonial)
Preceded by Mary Jo Kilroy as Former U.S. Representative	Order of precedence of the United States as Former U.S. Representative	Succeeded by Brian Kerns as Former U.S. Representative
