= Jackie Clarkson =

American politician (1936–2024)

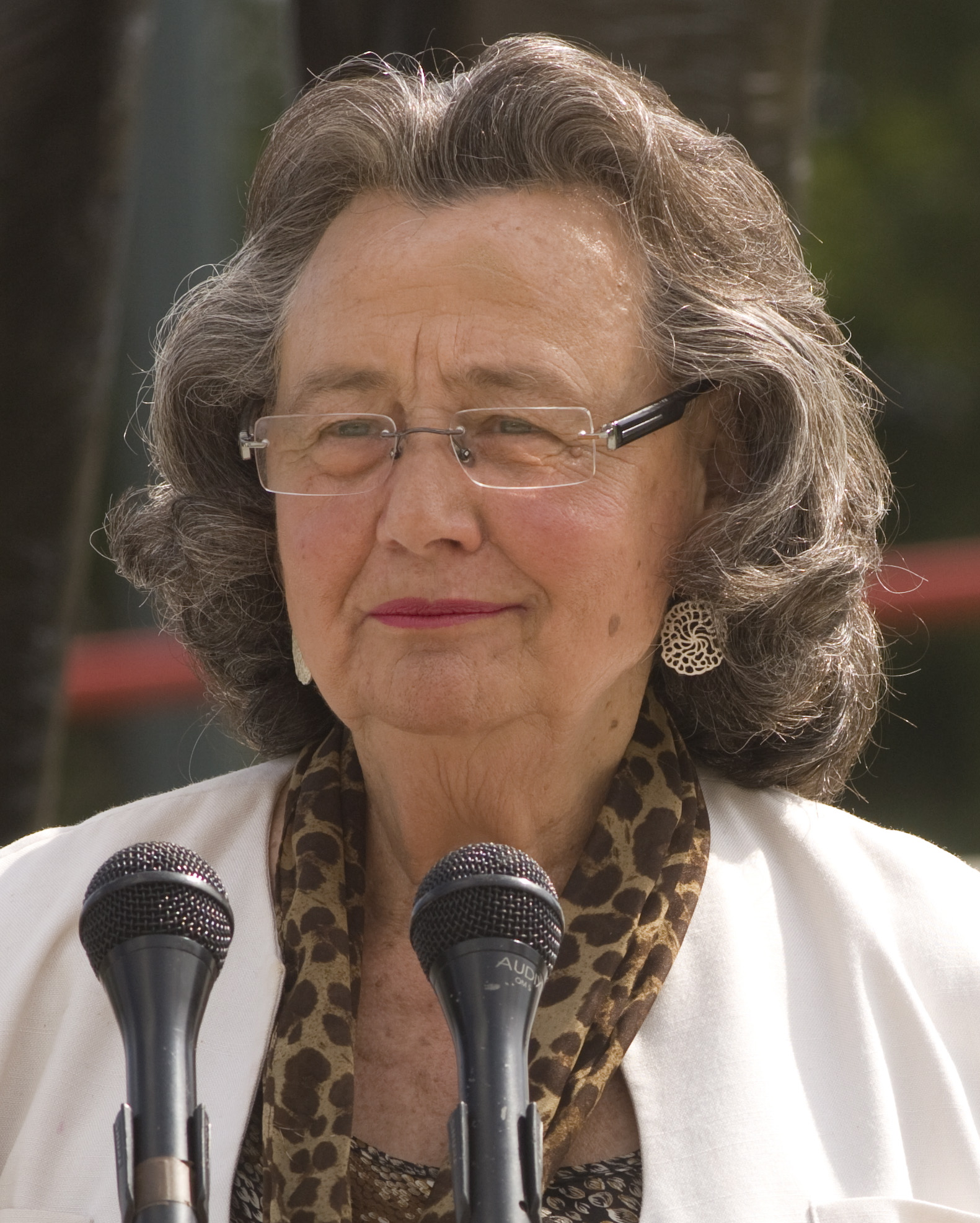
- Clarkson in 2012

Member of the New Orleans City Council
- In office 2007–2014
- Preceded by: Michael C. Darnell (interim)
- Succeeded by: Jason Williams
- Constituency: At-large (division 2)
- In office 2002–2006
- Preceded by: Troy Carter
- Succeeded by: James Carter
- Constituency: District C
- In office 1990–1994
- Preceded by: Mike Early
- Succeeded by: Troy Carter
- Constituency: District C

Member of the Louisiana House of Representatives from the 102nd district
- In office 1994–2002
- Preceded by: Troy Carter
- Succeeded by: Jeff Arnold

Personal details
- Born: Jacquelyn Brechtel; January 17, 1936 New Orleans, Louisiana, U.S.
- Died: June 26, 2024 (aged 88)
- Party: Democratic
- Spouse: Arthur Clarkson
- Children: 5, including Patricia Clarkson

Jacquelyn Brechtel Clarkson (January 17, 1936 – June 26, 2024) was an American politician who served in the Louisiana House of Representatives from 1994 to 2002 and on the New Orleans City Council from 1990 to 1994, 2002 to 2006, and 2007 to 2013. She had been Honorary consul of Lithuania in New Orleans from December 2014 to her death. She was the mother of actress Patricia Clarkson.

== Background ==
Clarkson was born as Jacquelyn Brechtel in New Orleans on January 17, 1936. Her maternal grandmother, Sophie Bass, was a Jewish immigrant from Lithuania, while her maternal grandfather was a Spanish immigrant. She was the daughter of Sophie (née Berengher) and Johnny Brechtel, a football coach of German and Irish descent. She was married to Arthur Clarkson and they have five daughters, including Academy Award-nominated actress Patricia Clarkson. Before entering politics she was in real estate and president of the Louisiana Realtor Association.

Clarkson represented District C on the New Orleans City Council from 1990 to 1994 and from 2002 to 2006, as well as District 102 at the Louisiana House of Representatives. The boundaries of District 102 are roughly the same as the Algiers neighborhood (also known as the Fifteenth Ward) in New Orleans. Those of District C include Algiers, as well as the Vieux Carré or French Quarter neighborhood.

Clarkson died on June 26, 2024, at the age of 88.

== After Hurricane Katrina ==
Clarkson ran for Councilmember at Large in 2006, but she lost in the general election, often called the runoff in Louisiana, against Arnie Fielkow, another Democrat and former Executive Vice President of the National Football League's New Orleans Saints. Mayor Ray Nagin won re-election only after facing a much tougher challenge than expected before the hurricane, and half of the council members who ran again were defeated.

The resignation of Councilmember at Large Oliver Thomas in 2007 over bribery charges enabled Clarkson to return on New Orleans City Council. She was elected to her first term as Councilmember-at-Large in a special election in November 2007, defeating Cynthia Willard-Lewis.

Clarkson in 2008 and 2009 became particularly outspoken in defending likeminded councilwoman Stacy Head in a feud with city sanitation director Veronica White. Clarkson called for White's dismissal, but Nagin defended White.

Clarkson was re-elected as Councilmember at Large in February 2010 (again narrowly defeating Cynthia Willard-Lewis), and was named president of the council in May 2011.

== Election history ==
Although a lifelong Democrat, Clarkson had received support from Republican organizations including the Parish Executive Committee of the Orleans Parish Republican Party. In 2008 she broke party ranks and supported Republican challenger Anh "Joseph" Cao in his longshot but successful bid to unseat Democratic incumbent William J. Jefferson from Louisiana's 2nd congressional district seat. Likeminded fellow Democratic Councilwoman Stacy Head found herself soon facing a recall petition. Clarkson, however, was not subjected to a recall effort; as councilwoman-at-large she represented a broader constituency, and she was more ingrained into the New Orleans political scene. In May 2009, as the New Orleans e-mail controversies intensified, Clarkson began publishing thousands of her e-mail messages online:

Anything we don't want the public to see, we shouldn't put in an e-mail. [...] Just let us do it responsibly so private information about our constituents doesn't get out there.

Orleans Parish Councilmember, District C, 1994
Party	Candidate	Votes	%
Democratic	Troy Carter	13,355	50.04
Democratic	Jackie Clarkson	13,331	49.96
Total votes		26,686	100.00

Louisiana State Representative, 102nd Representative District, 1994
Primary election
Party	Candidate	Votes	%
Democratic	Jackie Clarkson	4,018	49.07
Democratic	Yvonne Mitchell-Grubb	2,504	30.58
Democratic	Adam "12" Thomas, Sr.	642	7.84
Democratic	A. F. "Sonny" Armond	346	4.23
Democratic	Anna Perkins	231	2.82
Democratic	Kenneth P. Garrett, Sr.	226	2.76
Other	William "Van" Howenstine	222	2.71
Total votes		8,189	100.00
General election
Democratic	Jackie Clarkson	4,965	55.48
Democratic	Yvonne Mitchell-Grubb	3,984	44.52
Total votes		8,949	100.00

Louisiana State Representative, 102nd Representative District, 1995
Primary election
Party	Candidate	Votes	%
Democratic	Jackie Clarkson (incumbent)	4,691	45.42
Democratic	Ron Guidry	3,952	38.26
Republican	William "Van" Howenstine	1,122	10.86
Democratic	Philip Gibson	563	5.45
Total votes		10,328	100.00
General election
Democratic	Jackie Clarkson (incumbent)	6,040	50.89
Democratic	Ron Guidry	5,829	49.11
Total votes		11,869	100.00

Louisiana State Representative, 102nd Representative District, 1999
Party	Candidate	Votes	%
Democratic	Jackie Clarkson (incumbent)	5,520	62.30
Democratic	Kenneth P. Garrett	1,453	16.40
Democratic	Clifford Gasper	1,263	14.25
Democratic	Benita Williams Dalcour	625	7.05
Total votes		8,861	100.00

Orleans Parish Councilmember, District C, 2002
Party	Candidate	Votes	%
Democratic	Jackie Clarkson	11,961	52.56
Democratic	Catherine Smith	3,783	16.62
Democratic	Nelson Savoie	2,721	11.96
Democratic	Danette O'Neal	2,688	11.81
Other	Catherine Moody	984	4.32
Other	Lawrence J. Goldstein	620	2.72
Total votes		22,757	100.00

Orleans Parish Councilmembers at Large (2 seats), 2006
Primary election
Party	Candidate	Votes	%
Democratic	Oliver Thomas (winner)	66,374	39.19
Democratic	Jackie Clarkson (runoff)	36,839	21.75
Democratic	Arnie Fielkow (runoff)	31,092	18.36
Democratic	David Lapin	9,239	5.46
Democratic	Leonard Lucas, Jr	8,736	5.16
Republican	Michael T. Gray	7,220	4.26
No party preference	Roger Wilson	2,985	1.76
Republican	Alden G. Hagardorn	2,579	1.52
No party preference	William "Poppa" Gant	1,919	1.13
Democratic	Carlos J. Hornbrook	1,701	1.00
No party preference	"Les" Evenchick	681	0.40
Total votes		169,365	100.00
General election
Democratic	Arnie Fielkow	61,420	56.48
Democratic	Jackie Clarkson	47,324	43.52
Total votes		108,744	100.00

Orleans Parish Councilmembers at Large, 2007
Primary election
Party	Candidate	Votes	%
Democratic	Cynthia Willard-Lewis	20,623	28.01
Democratic	Jackie Clarkson	15,766	21.41
Democratic	Virginia Boulet	14,620	19.86
Democratic	Diana E. Bajoie	7,816	10.62
Other	Kaare Johnson	4,569	6.21
Democratic	Tommie A. Vassel	4,259	5.78
Democratic	Kimberly Williamson Butler	2,622	3.56
No party preference	Malcolm Suber	832	1.13
No party preference	Thomas Lewis	777	1.06
No party preference	Quentin Brown	521	0.71
Democratic	Dyan French	512	0.70
Democratic	Gail Masters Reimonenq	294	0.40
Total votes		73,627	100.00
General election
Democratic	Jackie Clarkson	27,740	52.72
Democratic	Cynthia Willard-Lewis	24,874	47.28
Total votes		52,614	100.00

== Footnotes ==
Political offices
Preceded by Mike Early (D)	New Orleans Councilmember, District C 1990–1994	Succeeded by Troy Carter (D)
Preceded by Troy Carter (D)	Louisiana State Representative, 102nd Representative District; 1994–2002	Succeeded by Jeff Arnold (D)
Preceded by Troy Carter (D)	New Orleans Councilmember, District C 2002–2006	Succeeded by James Carter (D)
Preceded by Michael C. Darnell (D); Interim	New Orleans Councilmember at Large; 2007–2014	Succeeded by Jason Williams
