= New Orleans City Council =

Legislation of the city of New Orleans

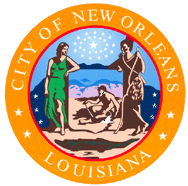

Type
- Type: Unicameral

Leadership
- Council President: Jean-Paul Morrell (D) since January 2023
- Council Vice President: Matthew Willard (D) since January 2026

Structure
- Seats: 7
- Political groups: Democratic (7)

Elections
- Voting system: Two-round system
- Last election: November 15, 2025

Meeting place
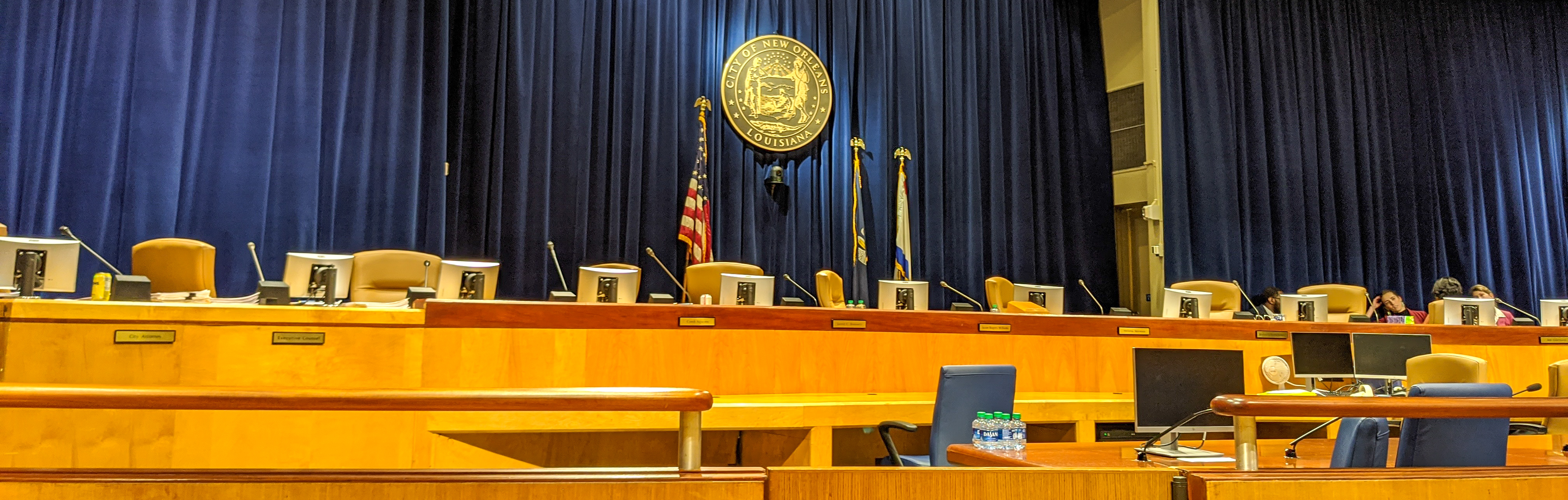
- New Orleans City Hall; Council Chamber; New Orleans, LA

Website
- Official website

The New Orleans City Council is the legislative branch of the City of New Orleans, Louisiana, United States. Established in 1954 through a home rule charter, it replaced the city’s previous commission form of government created under the 1912 Charter. The current structure includes seven members: five elected from single-member districts and two elected at-large. Council members serve four-year terms, elected using the two-round system.

The Council holds broad legislative powers, including enacting local laws, approving the city budget, and overseeing taxation and appropriations. It is responsible for laws related to public health, safety, welfare, and urban development, such as zoning regulations, housing standards, and land use policies. The Council also acts as a Board of Review for property tax assessments and has final approval over significant contracts, appointments, and city agency budgets. Its authority extends uniquely to regulating electric and gas utilities within the city, a power typically reserved for state commissions in most U.S. municipalities.

== Members ==
The Council’s structure includes a president and vice president chosen from among its members at its organizational meeting following elections. One at-large member serves as president, while any other member may serve as vice president. Leadership traditionally rotates annually between the two at-large members. Council business is supported by personal and central staff, with additional assistance from executive branch advisors. Public transparency is maintained through open meetings, public records compliance, and adherence to state and city ethics codes.

The current members of the New Orleans City Council:

Officers:

- President: Jean-Paul Morrell

District	Name	Party
A	Aimee McCarron	DEM
B	Lesli Harris	DEM
C	Freddie King III	DEM
D	Eugene J. Green	DEM
E	Jason Hughes	DEM
At-large Division 1	Matthew Willard	DEM
At-large Division 2	Jean-Paul "JP" Morrell	DEM

All 7 members of the council are Democrats

== Council members 1803–1828 ==
Term	Mayor	First District	Second District	Third District	Fourth District	Fifth District	Sixth District	Seventh District	Eight District	Unknown
December 20, 1803 – May 26, 1804	Étienne de Boré			Caraby, (Note: As commissioner.) S. Landreau	Louis Lioteau, P. Profit					Allard Jr., Caricks, Cavelier Petit, Lebreton Deschapelles, Donaldson, François Joseph LeBreton Dorgenois, Joseph Faurie, Fortier, W. E. Hulings, Jones, J. Livaudais, Pierre Petit, James Pitot, Thomas H. Porée, A. D. Tureaud, Villere, J. N. Watkins, S. Winter
June 6, 1804 – July 26, 1805	Cavelier Petit	Felix Arnaud, James Garrick	Francois Duplessis, Joseph Faurie	J. D. D. Bellechasse, Guy Dreux	Antoine Argotte, Pierre Bertonnière, P. Profit	Thomas L. Harman, P. Lavergne, Macdonaugh, S. Winter	John B. Macarty, F. K. Dorville	François Joseph LeBreton Dorgenois, François M. Guerin, Thomas H. Porée		Hazeur Delorme Sr., W. Donaldson, M. Fortier, J. W. Gurley, J. Livaudais, Pollock, Pierre Petit, John Watkins
June 6, 1804 – July 26, 1805	James Pitot	Felix Arnaud, James Garrick	Francois Duplessis, Joseph Faurie	J. D. D. Bellechasse, Guy Dreux	Antoine Argotte, Pierre Bertonnière, P. Profit	Thomas L. Harman, P. Lavergne, Macdonaugh, S. Winter	John B. Macarty, F. K. Dorville	François Joseph LeBreton Dorgenois, François M. Guerin, Thomas H. Porée		Hazeur Delorme Sr., W. Donaldson, M. Fortier, J. W. Gurley, J. Livaudais, Pollock, Pierre Petit, John Watkins
July 27, 1805 – March 8, 1807	John Watkins	Felix Arnaud	Francois Duplessis, Joseph Faurie, D. Urquhart	Deflechier, Guy Dreux, Robelot	Antoine Argotte, Pierre Bertonnière, P. Profit	Antoine Carraby, Thomas L. Harman, P. Lavergne, Macdonaugh, S. Winter	John B. Macarty, Lebreton Deschapelles, Mayronne	François Joseph LeBreton Dorgenois, François M. Guerin, Thomas H. Porée		Louis Blanc, Deflechier, Hazeur Delorme Sr., J. Du Buys, Guillotte, J. Livaudais, Arnaud Magnon, C. Patton, Pedesclaux, Pollock, Denis de la Ronde, Charles Trudeau
March 9, 1807 – May 23, 1812	James Mather	Jean Lanna, Thomas H. Porée, L. S. Fontaine	Francois Duplessis, Joseph Faurie, J. Henderson, R. Relf, D. Urquhart, J. Starrett	Pierre Bertonnière, Deflechier, F. K. Dorville, Lafon, Robelot, J. Soulie, C. Treme	M. Bertoniere, A. Chastant, H. Lavigne, Ferdinand Percy	W. Brand, Antoine Carraby, James Freret, Thomas L. Harman, B. Morgan, J. Nc Neil, S. Winter	J. D. D. Bellechasse, L. Bouligny, Lebreton Deschapelles, Paul Lanusse, Francois Livaudais Sr. John B. Macarty, Mayronne	J. Blanque, J. Castanedo S. Duffossat, François M. Guerin	B. Marigny, Pierre Missotiere	Cenas, Colsson, Fortin, Laronde, Arnaud Magnon, C. Patton
May 23, 1812 – October 8, 1812	Charles Trudeau	Jean Lanna, Thomas H. Porée, L. S. Fontaine	Francois Duplessis, Joseph Faurie, J. Henderson, R. Relf, D. Urquhart, J. Starrett	Pierre Bertonnière, Deflechier, F. K. Dorville, Lafon, Robelot, J. Soulie, C. Treme	M. Bertoniere, A. Chastant, H. Lavigne, Ferdinand Percy	W. Brand, Antoine Carraby, James Freret, Thomas L. Harman, B. Morgan, J. Nc Neil, S. Winter	J. D. D. Bellechasse, L. Bouligny, Lebreton Deschapelles, Paul Lanusse, Francois Livaudais Sr. John B. Macarty, Mayronne	J. Blanque, J. Castanedo S. Duffossat, François M. Guerin	B. Marigny, Pierre Missotiere	Cenas, Colsson, Fortin, Laronde, Arnaud Magnon, C. Patton
October 8, 1812 – November 5, 1812	Nicholas Girod	John R. Grymes, O. H. Spencer, Maunsell White	Alexander C. Chopin, Ferdinand Percy, Paul Lanusse	J. B. Dejan Sr., Honoré Landreau, Pierre Roger	J. Lanna, Nicholas Lauve, J. Thierry (Note: Thierry died in office and was replaced by A. Abat.)	J. Blanque, B. Marigny	James Freret, Antoine Carraby	Chevalier Doriocourt, Louis Foucher	François Joseph LeBreton Dorgenois, Samuel C. Young	S. Henderson, Augustin de Macarty, Monlon
November 6, 1812 – December 4, 1812	François Joseph LeBreton Dorgenois	John R. Grymes, O. H. Spencer, Maunsell White	Alexander C. Chopin, Ferdinand Percy, Paul Lanusse	J. B. Dejan Sr., Honoré Landreau, Pierre Roger	J. Lanna, Nicholas Lauve, J. Thierry	J. Blanque, B. Marigny	James Freret, Antoine Carraby	Chevalier Doriocourt, Louis Foucher	Samuel C. Young	S. Henderson, Augustin de Macarty, Monlon
December 5, 1812 – September 4, 1815	Nicholas Girod	John R. Grymes, O. H. Spencer, Maunsell White	Alexander C. Chopin, Ferdinand Percy, Paul Lanusse	J. B. Dejan Sr., Honoré Landreau, Pierre Roger	J. Lanna, Nicholas Lauve, J. Thierry	J. Blanque, B. Marigny	James Freret, Antoine Carraby	Chevalier Doriocourt, Louis Foucher	François Joseph LeBreton Dorgenois, Samuel C. Young	S. Henderson, Augustin de Macarty, Monlon
September 4, 1815 – May 13, 1820	Augustin de Macarty	W. A. Depeyster, J. S. Gilly, Samuel H. Harper, Nathan Morse, Ben P. Porter, Spencer, James W. Widney	E. Carraby, Zenon Cavelier, Alexander C. Chopin, Ferdinand Percy, Joseph Tricou Pere	A. Davezac, Francois Dreux Sr., G. Preval, H. Remi, M. Roche, Roger, John Soulie	A. Abat, Pierre Cherbonnier, Jean Lanna, Eugene Leveau, J. Quessart	L. S. Blancard, J. Blanque, B. Marigny, Edmond Meance	J. B. Plauche, Louis Philippe de Roffignac, James Freret, V. Rillieux, A. H. Smith	Thomas Bryant, T. A. Rousseau	R. Blanc, Samuel C. Young	
May 14, 1820 – May 18, 1828	Louis Philippe de Roffignac	S. Blanc, W. Christy, Martin Gordon, Livermore, W. Morse, Paulding, S. Paxton, Alexander Philips, Ben P. Porter, Isaac T. Preston, J. L. Preston, Ripley, J. H. Shepherd, D. Urquhart, C. West	Bacas, E. Carraby, Lenon Cavelier, N. Girod, B. Gryma, N. Lauve, Yves L. Monier, Reynes, Thomas, J. B. B. Vignie, J. B. Wiltz	A. Abat, Bernard, M. Cruzat, A. Davezac, J. B. Faget, Mercier, Mittenberger, T. Mossey, Gallien Preval, J. Rodriguez	Francois Benetaud, J. Cucullu, Jean Lanna, B. Montreuil, Peychaud, J. Quessart	L. S. Blancard, J. F. Canonge, Leander La Coste, L. C. Hiligsberg, B. Marigny, Edmond Meance, Naba	Thomas Bickel, Nathaniel Cox, Harvey Elkins, Francois Gaiennie, Samuel H. Harper, P. D. Henry, John Linton, W. N. Montgomery, H. W. Palfrey, F. L. Turner, Maunsell White	J. A. Fort, Burthe, P. Foucher, Charles Genois, Kenny Laverty, P. A. Rousseau	L. Allard, B. Beauregard, E. Blanc, M. Fleytas	

== Council members under the 1954 Charter ==
Under the 1954 Charter, council members are elected to four-year terms that begin on the first Monday in May following the election, except that a councilmember elected to fill a vacancy serves only for the remainder of the unexpired term. Vacancies that occur less than one year before the end of the term may be filled by appointment; vacancies of a year or longer are filled by special election, and that vacancy may be filled by appointment for the period before the special election. After the regular 1970 elections, a redistricting dispute delayed the next regular Council elections until 1976, and the following regular Council election was held in 1978. Effective in 1991, a council member who has served more than one and a half terms in two consecutive terms may not be elected to the office for the following term. Beginning in 2014 the at-large seats are voted on as separate offices, designated as Division 1 and Division 2. Effective June 1, 2018, the terms of office begin on the second Monday in January following the election.

Office holders for terms before 2022 and reference notes for those office holders are from the City Archives at the New Orleans Public Library. Office holders for the 2022-2026 term are from the Louisiana Secretary of State election results for the November 13, 2021, general election and the December 11, 2021, runoff election.

Term	At-Large Seats		District Seats				
Term	Division 1	Division 2	A	B	C	D	E
1954-1958	Glenn P. Clasen	Victor H. Schiro	A. Brown Moore	Paul V. Burke	James E. Fitzmorris	Fred J. Cassibry	Walter M. Duffourc
1958-1962	Glenn P. Clasen James A. Comiskey	Victor H. Schiro Theodore Hickey	Henry B. Curtis	Paul V. Burke	James E. Fitzmorris	Fred J. Cassibry John J. Petre	Theodore Hickey Walter M. Duffourc
1962-1966	James E. Fitzmorris	Joseph V. DiRosa	Henry B. Curtis	Walter F. Marcus	Clarence O. Dupuy, Jr.	John J. Petre	Daniel Kelly
1966-1970	John J. Petre	Moon Landrieu	Henry B. Curtis	Eddie L. Sapir	Clarence O. Dupuy, Jr.	James A. Moreau	Philip Ciaccio
1970-1976	Joseph V. DiRosa	James A. Moreau	Peter H. Beer Frank Friedler	Eddie L. Sapir A.L. Davis	Clarence O. Dupuy, Jr.	John D. Lambert	Philip Ciaccio
1976-1978	Joseph V. DiRosa	Joseph I. Giarrusso	Frank Friedler	A.L. Davis	Mike Early	Brod Bagert	Philip Ciaccio
1978-1982	Sidney J. Barthelemy	Joseph I. Giarrusso	Frank Friedler Joel Loeffleholz Bryan Wagner	James (Jim) Singleton	Mike Early	Brod Bagert Niles Hellmers Lambert Boissiere	Philip Ciaccio Howard Beck
1982-1986	Sidney J. Barthelemy	Joseph I. Giarrusso	Bryan Wagner	James (Jim) Singleton	Mike Early	Lambert Boissiere	Wayne Babovich Ulysses Williams
1986-1990	Dorothy Mae Taylor	Joseph I. Giarrusso	Peggy Wilson	James (Jim) Singleton	Mike Early	Lambert Boissiere	Johnny Jackson, Jr.
1990-1994	Dorothy Mae Taylor	Joseph I. Giarrusso	Peggy Wilson	James (Jim) Singleton	Jacquelyn B. Clarkson	Lambert Boissiere	Johnny Jackson, Jr.
1994-1998	Peggy Wilson	James (Jim) Singleton	Suzanne Haik Terrell	Oliver Thomas	Troy Carter	Roy Glapion	Ellen Hazeur-Distance
1998-2002	Eddie L. Sapir	James (Jim) Singleton	Suzanne Haik Terrell Howell Crosby Scott Shea	Oliver Thomas	Troy Carter	Roy Glapion H. Kenneth Johnston Marlin Gusman	Ellen Hazeur-Distance Lula Harris Breaux Cynthia Willard-Lewis
2002-2006	Eddie L. Sapir	Oliver Thomas	John A. Batt, Jr.	Renée Gill Pratt	Jacquelyn B. Clarkson	Marlin Gusman David Payton Cynthia Hedge-Morrell	Cynthia Willard-Lewis
2006-2010	Arnie Fielkow	Oliver Thomas Michael Darnell Jacquelyn B. Clarkson	Shelley Midura	Stacey Head	James Carter	Cynthia Hedge-Morrell	Cynthia Willard-Lewis
2010-2014	Arnie Fielkow Eric Granderson Stacey Head	Jacquelyn B. Clarkson	Susan Guidry	Stacey Head Diana Bajoie LaToya Cantrell	Kristen Gisleson Palmer	Cynthia Hedge-Morrell	Jon Johnson Ernest Charbonnet James Austin Gray II
2014-2018	Stacey Head	Jason Williams Donna Glapion	Susan Guidry	LaToya Cantrell	Nadine Ramsey	Jared C. Brossett	James Austin Gray II
2018-2022	Helena N. Moreno	Jason Williams Donna Glapion	Joseph I. Giarrusso III	Jay H. Banks	Kristen Gisleson Palmer	Jared C. Brossett	Cyndi Nguyen
2022-2026	Helena N. Moreno	Jean-Paul "JP" Morrell	Joseph I. Giarrusso III	Lesli Harris	Freddie King III	Eugene J. Green	Oliver Thomas
2026-2030	Matthew Willard	Jean-Paul "JP" Morrell	Aimee McCarron	Lesli Harris	Freddie King III	Eugene J. Green	Jason Hughes

== Earlier members, under the commission form of government ==
- A. Brown Moore (Public utilities commissioner, 1950–1954)
- Lionel Ott (Finance commissioner, 1946–1954)
