= Jason Williams (politician) =

American politician

Jason Rogers Williams
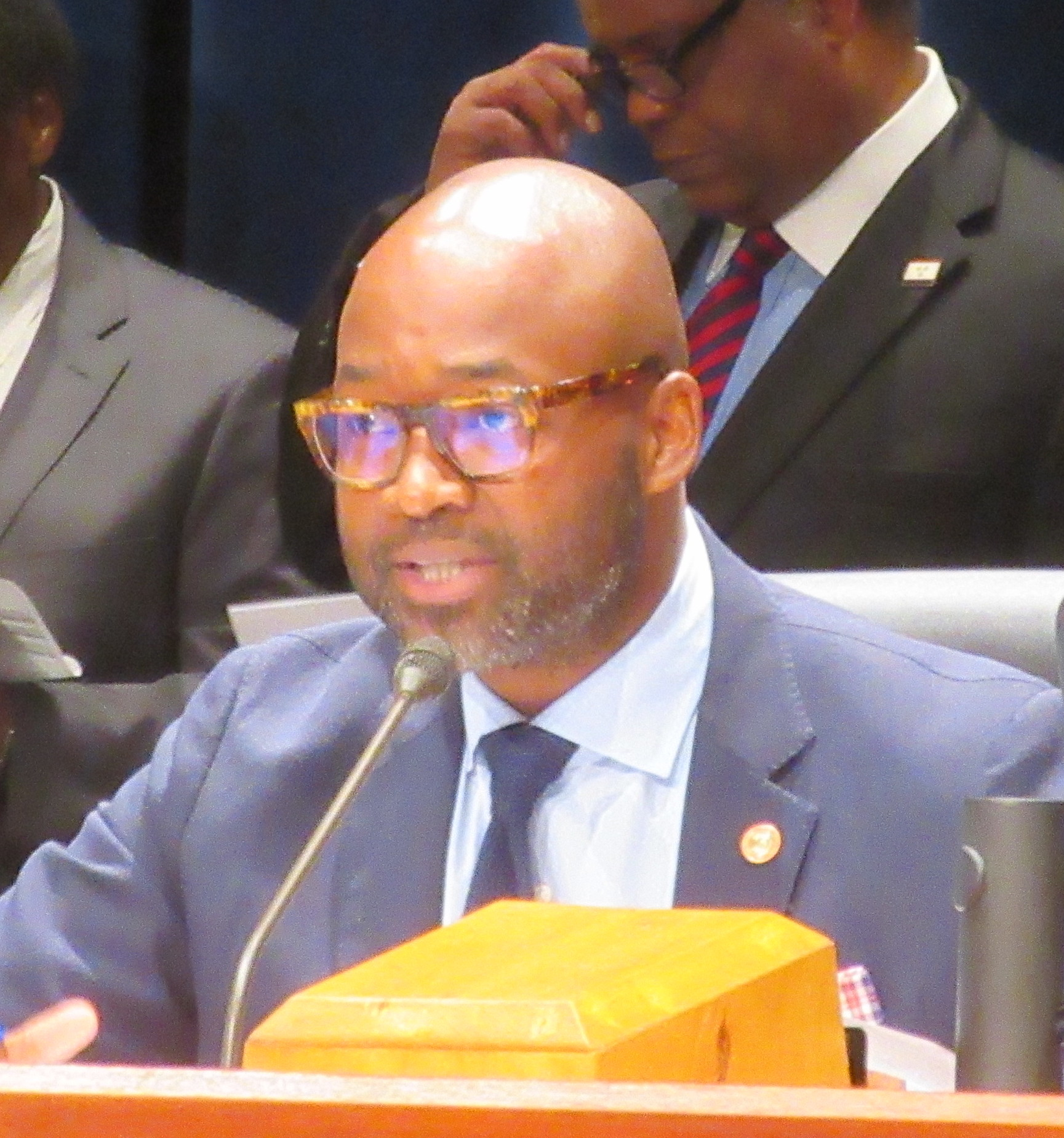

Orleans Parish District Attorney
- Incumbent
- Assumed office January 11, 2021
- Preceded by: Leon Cannizzaro

Member of the New Orleans City Council from the at-large district
- In office March 15, 2014 – January 11, 2021
- Preceded by: Jackie Clarkson
- Succeeded by: Donna Glapion

Personal details
- Born: Jason Rogers Williams; November 2, 1972 (age 53) New Orleans, Louisiana, U.S.
- Party: Democratic
- Spouse: Elizabeth Marcell
- Children: 3
- Education: Tulane University (BA, JD)

Jason Rogers Williams (born November 2, 1972) is an American politician and attorney who is the Orleans Parish District Attorney; he assumed office in 2021. From 2014 to 2021, Williams served as the Second Division councilmember-at-large on the New Orleans City Council. He is a member of the Democratic Party, and was elected district attorney on a progressive platform.

== Early Legal Career ==
After earning his JD from Tulane Law School, Williams founded the law firm Jason Rogers Williams & Associates and built a reputation handling criminal matters. He volunteered extensively with Innocence Project New Orleans (IPNO), assisting with the exonerations of Greg Bright and Earl Truvia, who were wrongfully imprisoned for nearly three decades. He later served on IPNO’s board for over 10 years.

In 2003, at age 30, Williams ran for Orleans Parish District Attorney, mounting a reform-oriented campaign that emphasized smarter and fairer criminal justice. Though unsuccessful, the campaign established his public platform and introduced his "smart on crime" ethos.

=== Notable Cases ===
In 2011, Williams represented rapper Boosie Badazz (formerly Lil Boosie) in a high-profile first-degree murder trial in Baton Rouge. Prosecutors had attempted to use Boosie's lyrics as evidence of intent, but Williams argued this was artistic expression, not proof of criminal behavior. The jury ultimately found Boosie not guilty on all counts. Williams stated after the verdict, “This man has been innocent… I thank God that the truth came out.”

== New Orleans City Council (2014–2021) ==
Williams was elected to the New Orleans City Council as an At-Large Member in 2014, defeating two-term incumbent Cynthia Hedge-Morrell with 68% of the vote in a runoff election. He served two terms on the Council and was later elected Council President.

=== Smart City and Utility Reform ===
As Chair of the Utility Committee, Williams led efforts to modernize city infrastructure through smart city technology. In 2018, he authored a resolution initiating a comprehensive exploration of grid modernization, data integration, and equitable technology deployment. He called the effort “a once-in-a-generation opportunity” and stressed that all communities—including low-income areas—should benefit from digital infrastructure.

Williams also played a key role in the 2018 investigation of Entergy New Orleans, after it was discovered the utility paid actors to pose as grassroots supporters of a controversial power plant. He demanded a full, independent investigation and later backed a $5 million fine against Entergy—the largest ever levied by the Council.

=== Cannabis Decriminalization ===
In 2016, Williams co-sponsored legislation with Councilmember Susan Guidry that decriminalized simple marijuana possession in New Orleans. The ordinance replaced arrest with a summons and reduced penalties to $40–$100 fines. Williams supported the policy as a way to reduce unnecessary jail bookings and allow NOPD to focus on serious crimes.

=== Immigration and Civil Liberties ===
In January 2017, he joined demonstrators at City Hall to protest the Muslim travel ban, calling it a racist and xenophobic policy.

In 2018, as Council President, Williams co-authored a resolution condemning the federal policy of separating immigrant children from their parents at the U.S.–Mexico border. He described the practice as “inhumane and unnecessary,” and compared it to some of the darkest chapters in U.S. history.

== Cultural and Civic Engagement ==
Williams served as the King of the Krewe of Freret in 2014, helping relaunch the Uptown New Orleans Mardi Gras parade after a 20-year hiatus. He called the event a celebration of neighborhood revitalization, saying it symbolized “the comeback of Freret Street and the city as a whole.”

== District Attorney of Orleans Parish (2021–present) ==
Jason Rogers Williams was sworn in as District Attorney of Orleans Parish on January 11, 2021, after campaigning on a platform of progressive criminal justice reform. During his tenure, he has pursued a dual mission of reducing violent crime and correcting past injustices through systemic reform.

=== Violent Crime Prosecution and Reform ===
In his first year in office, Williams secured over 1,700 convictions, obtained 58 grand jury indictments in violent cases, and launched a Cold Case Unit that successfully indicted a 2016 homicide. He also created a Restorative Justice Diversion Program and invested in crime prevention strategies like Risk Terrain Modeling (RTM) to reduce environmental factors contributing to crime.

Williams restructured use of Louisiana’s habitual offender statute, which had historically contributed to mass incarceration. Initially pledging not to invoke it, he later adopted a limited-use policy with strict internal criteria, applying it only in violent offenses involving prior convictions.

=== Post-Conviction Relief and Civil Rights ===
Williams established a Civil Rights Division to review convictions, particularly those based on non-unanimous jury verdicts. His office reviewed more than 300 such cases, vacating nearly 100 excessive sentences and bringing home 86 individuals—49 of whom were serving life without parole. The move was praised by advocates as both fiscally responsible and morally imperative, with estimates suggesting $5 million in annual savings to the state.

In testimony before the Louisiana Legislature, Williams defended his office's efforts, stating they were necessary to rectify racially biased convictions and uphold constitutional standards. His work on post-conviction relief has drawn both support and scrutiny statewide.

=== Community Engagement and Victim Advocacy ===
Williams launched the New Orleans Data-Informed Community Engagement (N.O.D.I.C.E.) program and partnered with public libraries to open satellite DA offices in historically underserved neighborhoods.

To promote transparency, he introduced public-facing data dashboards and held quarterly forums to solicit community feedback.

=== National Recognition and Public Profile ===
In July 2022, Williams was acquitted of all federal tax fraud charges, allowing him to continue his term uninterrupted. He has since been profiled by the National Press Foundation as “a champion for justice and equality,” and continues to serve as a national voice for ethical prosecution and reform.

In May 2025, Williams defended his office's record, noting an 85.7% conviction rate in homicide jury trials with no prosecutorial misconduct or abuse of habitual offender laws.
