= Oliver Thomas =

American politician

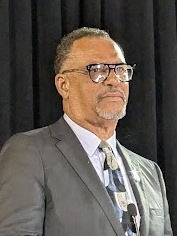

Member of the New Orleans City Council from District E
- In office 2022 – January 12, 2026
- Preceded by: Cyndi Nguyen
- Succeeded by: Jason Hughes

Member of the New Orleans City Council from the at-large district
- In office 2002 – August 13, 2007
- Preceded by: Jim Singleton
- Succeeded by: Michael Darnell

Member of the New Orleans City Council from the District B
- In office 1994–2002
- Preceded by: Jim Singleton
- Succeeded by: Renée Gill Pratt

Personal details
- Born: Oliver Marion Thomas Jr. 1957 (age 68–69) New Orleans, Louisiana, U.S.
- Party: Democratic
- Education: College of Santa Fe (BA)

Oliver Marion Thomas Jr. is an American politician, actor, writer, and poet who served on the New Orleans City Council from 2022 to 2026 and previously from 1994 to 2007, when he resigned his council seat after pleading guilty to bribery charges. On December 11, 2021, Thomas again won election to the city council. He is a member of the Democratic Party.

== Early life ==
Thomas was born in New Orleans's Lower Ninth Ward, the son of a laborer and a telephone operator. After graduating from Joseph S. Clark High School, he was able to go to college after receiving an athletic scholarship. In 1982, Thomas received a bachelor's degree in business studies from the College of Santa Fe, a liberal arts institution in Santa Fe, New Mexico.

After graduation, he spent several years on the East Coast working as an account executive for a travel company. He returned to New Orleans in 1985, where he worked as a substitute teacher and began volunteering in a number of political campaigns.

== Political career ==
A protégé of longtime city councilor Jim Singleton, Thomas was appointed a legislative aide to Singleton in 1986. He then worked as a capital projects manager for the city's Downtown Development District, and as a property manager for a firm in private industry.

Thomas was first elected to City Council in 1994, representing District B – a district which includes Central City as well as the Central Business District and parts of Mid-City and Uptown. He served as councilor for this district for two terms before being elected to an at-large seat in 2002. While on city council, Thomas developed a reputation as a capable, responsive elected official; he gained a high level of popularity among both black and white voters. His popularity was confirmed in both the elections of 2002 and 2006, when he was elected with a margin wide enough to avoid needing a runoff. He won with 88% of the vote in 2002 and was re-elected with 78% of the vote in 2006.

=== Bribery and resignation ===
On August 13, 2007, Thomas resigned his council seat and pleaded guilty to a federal bribery charge, a felony. In late 2001 and early 2002, Thomas took $15,000 in kickbacks from Stan "Pampy" Barre, a local businessman and associate of then-mayor Marc Morial. Barre owned a company which operated a number of French Quarter parking lots under contract with the city, and paid Thomas in order to ensure that the Morial-era contracts would be renewed under the incoming administration. Thomas agreed to Barre's terms, but also demanded and received one-third of the parking profits in kickbacks through one of his associates. On November 21, 2007, Thomas was sentenced to 37 months in federal prison for bribery.

Thomas reported in January 2008 to the Atlanta Federal Penitentiary in Georgia. In June 2009, he was transferred to the low-security Federal Correctional Institution in Oakdale, Louisiana. On March 30, 2010, Thomas was released from Oakdale and moved into a halfway house in the New Orleans neighborhood of Gentilly to serve the final few months of his sentence. In August 2010, he was allowed to return to his home and serve the remainder of his sentence under home confinement. His sentence was officially completed on September 8, 2010, having been reduced for good behavior while he was incarcerated.

=== Return to politics ===
There had been widespread speculation that Thomas would run for Mayor of New Orleans in 2010. In 2022, Thomas was again elected to the New Orleans City Council to represent District E, which includes New Orleans East and the Lower Ninth Ward, following a runoff election victory in December 2021. After securing the most votes in the Primary on Nov. 13, 2021, he defeated the incumbent councilmember, Cyndi Nguyen, securing nearly 57% of the runoff votes on December 11, 2021.

== Other ventures ==
=== Acting career ===
Not long after his release from prison, Thomas starred in Reflections: A Man and His Time, a biographical play co-written with Anthony Bean, about his political downfall and personal redemption. Oliver Thomas played himself in multiple episodes in Season 2 of HBO's Treme. In the show, a fictionalized version of events is told, set in 2007, taking place just before his real-life arrest for bribery in 2007.

=== Radio career ===
Thomas hosts a morning show on WBOK.

== Personal life ==
Following his divorce from Angelle Laraque, with whom he shares a daughter, Leah, and a son, Bradley, who is deceased, he married Jasmine Thomas. The couple has since had a son, named Oliver "Ollie" Thomas III, and a daughter, Willow.

== Election history ==
Councilmember, District B, 1994

Threshold > 50%

First Ballot, February 5, 1994

Candidate	Affiliation	Support	Outcome
Oliver Thomas	Democratic	9467 (42%)	Runoff
Renée Gill Pratt	Democratic	8609 (38%)	Runoff
Others		20%	Defeated

Councilmember, District B, 1994

Threshold > 50%

Runoff, March 5, 1994

Candidate	Affiliation	Support	Outcome
Oliver Thomas	Democratic	13,964 (52%)	Elected
Renée Gill Pratt	Democratic	13,042 (48%)	Defeated

Councilmember, District B, 1998

Threshold > 50%

First Ballot, February 7, 1998

Candidate	Affiliation	Support	Outcome
Oliver Thomas	Democratic	16,759 (90%)	Elected
Diane Prunty-Williams	Republican	1897 (10%)	Defeated

At-Large Councilmember, 2002

Threshold >25% (two to be elected)

Candidate	Affiliation	Support	Outcome
Oliver Thomas	Democratic	84,346 (44%)	Elected
Eddie Sapir	Democratic	79,472 (41%)	Elected
Others		15%	Defeated

At-Large Councilmember, 2006

Threshold >25% (two to be elected)

Candidate	Affiliation	Support	Outcome
Oliver Thomas	Democratic	66,374 (39%)	Elected
Jackie Clarkson	Democratic	36,839 (22%)	Runoff
Arnie Fielkow	Democratic	31,092 (18%)	Runoff
Others		20%	Defeated
