= Arnie Fielkow =

American lawyer

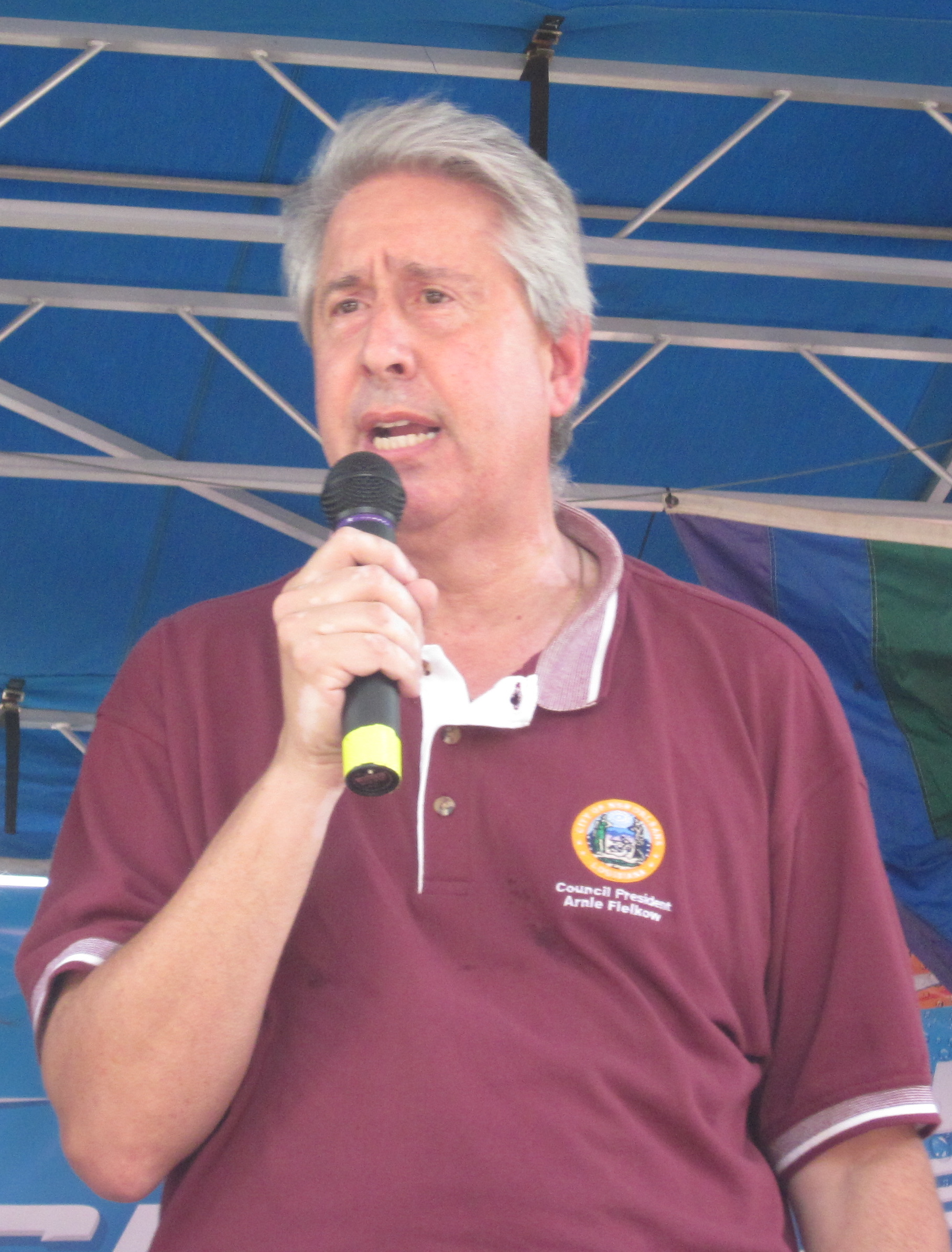

Member of the New Orleans City Council from the at-large district
- In office 2006–2011
- Preceded by: Eddie L. Sapir
- Succeeded by: Eric Granderson

Personal details
- Born: Arnold D. Fielkow Appleton, Wisconsin, U.S.
- Party: Democratic
- Education: Northwestern University (BA); University of Wisconsin (JD)
- Football career

Career history
- North Star Conference (1989–1991) Commissioner; Continental Basketball Association (1991–1994) Deputy commissioner; Southern League (1994–2000) President; New Orleans Saints (2000–2005) Executive vice president/Administration; National Basketball Retired Players Association (2011–2017) CEO

Arnold "Arnie" D. Fielkow is an American sports administrator, attorney, and politician who is the CEO and president of the Jewish Federation of Greater New Orleans. Until June 2017, he was the president and CEO of the National Basketball Retired Players Association (NBRPA). Fielkow was formerly a Democratic politician in New Orleans. In November 2006, he won a seat on the New Orleans City Council as an at-large member, and later was city council president. He was reelected in 2010. In the fall of 2011, he announced his resignation.

== Early life and education ==
Fielkow was born and raised in Appleton, Wisconsin. He earned a Bachelor of Arts degree from Northwestern University and his Juris Doctor from the University of Wisconsin Law School in 1981.

== Career ==
=== Sports administration ===
In 1989, Fielkow was named commissioner of the North Star Conference. In 1991 he was chosen for the same position with the Trans-America Athletic Conference, however before taking office he chose to take the job of deputy commissioner of the Continental Basketball Association. In 1994 he became the president of the Southern League.

In 2000, Fielkow joined the New Orleans Saints of the National Football League as director of administration. He was Executive Vice President of the New Orleans Saints for six years, during which he presided over all administrative/business departments, including marketing, sales, regional development, governmental affairs, community relations, business media relations and youth programs. He was fired by Saints owner Tom Benson when he refused to resign and sign a confidentiality agreement. Fielkow had been vocal in opposing the concept of having the Saints play in San Antonio.

=== Politics ===
Following his firing, Fielkow was elected as one of New Orleans's two at-large council positions on May 20, 2006. He has chaired a number of committees including both the city's Economic Development Committee and the council's Youth and Recreation Committee. He has also co-founded the Fleur-de-lis Ambassadorship program with Tulane University president Scott Cowen. He has been a vocal supporter of public education, including the growing number of charter schools.

During the New Orleans e-mail controversies, Fielkow pledged to published 70,000 of his e-mail messages online.

Fielkow considered running to succeed Ray Nagin as Mayor of New Orleans in the 2010 mayoral election, but he chose to seek reelection instead. Fielkow was easily reelected to his position on the city council, with Mitch Landrieu ultimately winning the mayoral race.

On 22 August 2011, Fielkow announced his resignation from the Council effective 1 October. He planned to take a more lucrative job as CEO of the National Basketball Retired Players Association.

=== Election history ===
Councilmember(s) at-large (2), 2006

Threshold > 25%

First ballot, April 22, 2006

Candidate	Affiliation	Support	Outcome
Oliver Thomas	Democratic	66,374 (39%)	Elected
Jackie Clarkson	Democratic	36,839 (22%)	Runoff
Arnie Fielkow	Democratic	31,092 (18%)	Runoff
Others	n.a.	35,060 (21%)	Defeated

Second Ballot, May 20, 2006

Candidate	Affiliation	Support	Outcome
Arnie Fielkow	Democratic	61,420 (56%)	Elected
Jackie Clarkson	Democratic	47,324 (44%)	Defeated

Councilmember(s) at-large (2), 2010

Threshold > 25%

First Ballot, February 6, 2010

Candidate	Affiliation	Support	Outcome
Arnie Fielkow	Democratic	51,310 (35%)	Elected
Jackie Clarkson	Democratic	38,904 (26.5%)	Elected
Cynthia Willard-Lewis	Democratic	37,362 (25.5%)	Defeated
Nolan Marshall	Democratic	13,411 (9%)	Defeated
Others	n.a.	5,415 (4%)	Defeated
