= Irma Muse Dixon =

American politician (born 1952)

Irma Muse Dixon (born July 18, 1952, New Orleans, Louisiana) is an American social worker, manager, and African-American politician, the first to be elected to the Louisiana Public Service Commission (PSC). Dixon represented the Third District on the PSC from 1992 through 2004.

Dixon represented District 95 in the Louisiana House for four years (elected 1988, reelected 1991). She resigned from her second term after winning election to the PSC in 1992. Dixon's dozen years of service on PSC brought her a commendation from the National Association of Regulatory Utility Commissioners in 2004.

She has also held appointed positions in state and New Orleans city government, and in 2009 was selected as head of Beacon of Hope, a city non-profit.

== Early life and education ==
Irma Muse Dixon was born in 1952 in New Orleans. She attended local schools, which were then segregated. A graduate of Walter L. Cohen Senior High School, Dixon obtained her B.A. from Southern University in Baton Rouge. She holds a Master of Social Work from Tulane University.

After serving in the state legislature, Dixon was given a fellowship at Harvard University's John F. Kennedy School of Government.

== Career ==
In the early 1980s, Dixon worked with the Total Community Action Agency and its Central City Health Clinic. It was run by Dorothy Mae Taylor, who was the first African-American woman to have served in the Louisiana House of Representatives. Through this agency and clinic, Dixon groomed a generation of rising black politicians for leadership.

Dixon had joined the Democratic Party and decided to enter politics. In 1988, she was elected to the State House, representing District 95 in New Orleans. She was re-elected in 1991 to a second term.

In 1992, she was elected from the Third District to serve as the first African-American member of the Public Service Commission, resigning from the state House to do so. She was re-elected to that position, serving through 2004.

In 2002, Dixon sought a seat to represent Louisiana's 2nd congressional district; she lost to incumbent William J. Jefferson.

In 2004, she placed third in the primary for re-election to PSC District 3 (behind Cleo Fields and Lambert Boussiere III; Boussiere won the runoff.)

In 2007, Dixon ran for the open seat in Louisiana Senate District 5, vacated when incumbent Diana Bajoie was term-limited. (The runoff election was between Cheryl A. Gray Evans and Jalila Jefferson-Bullock; Evans won.)

== Post-electoral career ==
Dixon has served in state government with the Office of Employment Training and Development. She was appointed as undersecretary in the Department of Culture, Recreation and Tourism. She also served in New Orleans city government as appointed Director of the Department of Recreation.

She is a security manager for Xyant Technology.

Dixon has been active in a variety of civic activities: the Urban League, Boys and Girls Club of New Orleans, and YWCA. She belongs to New Orleans' Second Baptist Church.

In 2009, Dixon was chosen to head Beacon of Hope, a New Orleans non-profit and charitable organization.
