= Rosalind Peychaud =

American politician

Member of the Louisiana House of Representatives for the 91st District
- In office 2002–2004
- Preceded by: Renée Gill Pratt
- Succeeded by: Jalila Jefferson-Bullock

Personal details
- Born: 1948 (age 77–78)
- Education: Jackson State University; Tulane University

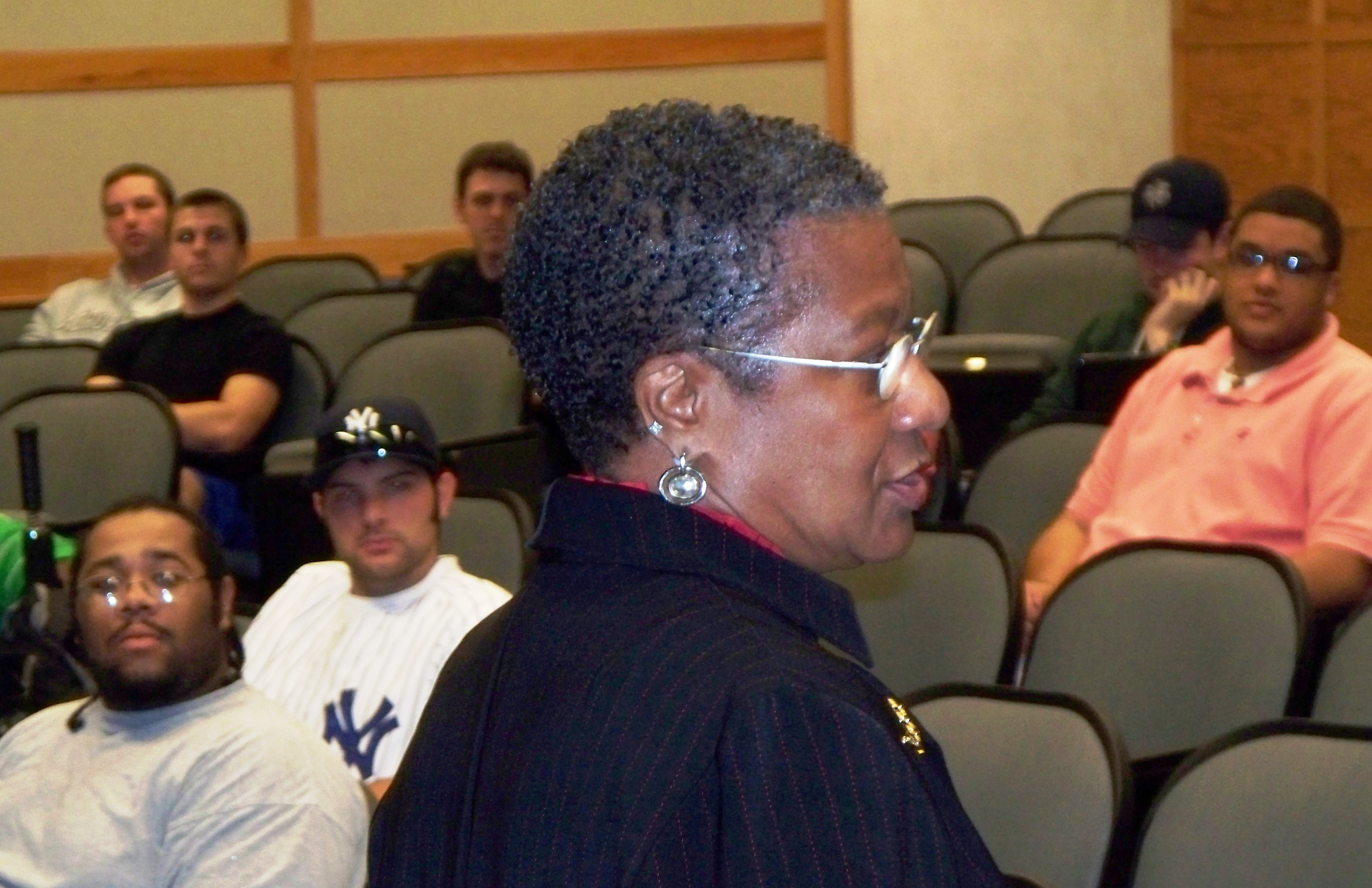
Rosalind Peychaud speaks on community organizing to students at Southeastern Louisiana University's Business Perspectives Program 2009.

Rosalind Magee Peychaud (born 1948) is an American politician and community leader. She served as a Democratic state representative for Louisiana’s 91st District from 2002 to 2004. In 2009, she was appointed deputy chief of staff for U.S. Representative Joseph Cao, a Republican representing Louisiana’s 2nd congressional district, where she worked in the New Orleans district office.

== Early life and education ==
Rosalind Magee was born in 1948 in Monticello, Mississippi. Her father, James H. Magee Sr., was a deacon at Oak Grove Missionary Baptist Church and died on September 18, 2002. Her mother was Marion Magee.

Peychaud has two sisters (Catherine Magee Thompson and Regina Magee Hudson) and a brother (James H. Magee Jr.).

Peychaud earned a Bachelor of Arts in Educational Psychology from Jackson State University and later obtained a Master of Social Work from Tulane University.

== NDF and other involvements ==
Peychaud serves as the executive director of the New Orleans Neighborhood Development Foundation (NDF). She is also a member of the Affordable Housing Advisory Authority for the Federal Home Loan Bank of Dallas.

She is a member of the New Orleans City Planning Commission, the Neighborhood Conservation District Committee (NCDC) of the City of New Orleans, and the Crescent City Connection Oversight Authority (CCCOA). NDF was established in 1986 and also had offices in Jackson, Mississippi. A distinct focus of NDF in New Orleans is the area now known as the Hoffman Triangle. On June 20, 2009, when the Neighborhood Conservation District Committee (NCDC) deliberated on two properties owned by Joseph Cao, Peychaud recused herself from the vote due to ethical considerations.

== Hoffman Triangle ==
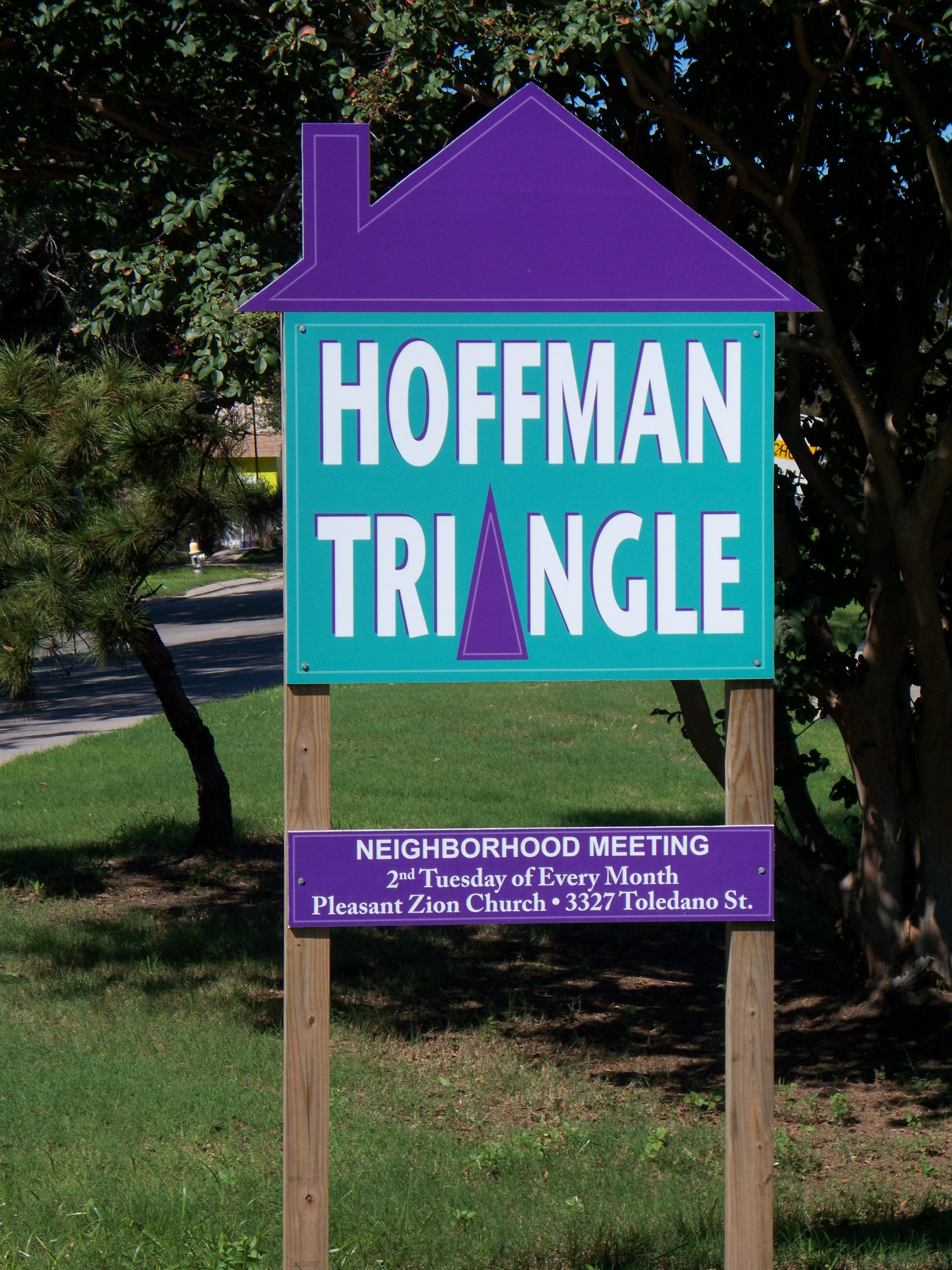
Signs in the Hoffman Triangle announce community improvement meetings and activities.

Peychaud coined the term "Hoffman Triangle" during her service in the Louisiana House of Representatives. She based the term on the name of the John W. Hoffman Elementary School at the corner of South Prieur Street and Third Street, within the Hoffman Triangle. The Hoffman Triangle was, in Peychaud's own words, an area of intense "trash, drugs, and blight" in the inner city of New Orleans. Conditions there naturally worsened during and after Hurricane Katrina in 2005. and they continued to concern Peychaud when she served as a panelist for the Third National Summit on Equitable Development, Social Justice, and Smart Growth in 2008.

== BOLD political organization ==
Peychaud was part of the reform wing of the Orleans Parish Democratic Party and often clashed with William J. Jefferson and his Progressive Democrats. In a district previously represented by Jefferson’s ally Renée Gill Pratt, Peychaud won a special election on May 4, 2002, defeating Jalila Jefferson-Bullock (one of Jefferson’s daughters). However, Jefferson-Bullock defeated her in the general election on November 15, 2003.

In the 2006 Democratic primary for Louisiana’s 2nd congressional district, Peychaud backed Karen Carter Peterson against Jefferson. When Jefferson won the Democratic primary again in 2008, she and several other prominent Democrats supported Republican Joseph Cao, who went on to defeat Jefferson in the general election.

Peychaud and the Jefferson family have had a long history of political rivalry. This has often put her in alignment with figures such as Karen Carter Peterson, James Carter (no relation to Peterson), Jacquelyn Brechtel Clarkson, Cheryl A. Gray Evans, Stacy Head, and Helena Moreno.

== Personal life ==
Rosalind Magee Peychaud is married to Joseph Ernest Peychaud, a descendant of Antoine Amédée Peychaud, originator of Peychaud's Bitters. Rosalind Peychaud, a Baptist, is a virtual teetotaler.

Political offices
Preceded by Renée Gill Pratt (D)	Louisiana Legislature House District 91 (Orleans Parish); 2002–2004	Succeeded by Jalila Jefferson-Bullock (D)
