= Louisiana's 91st House of Representatives district =

American legislative district

Louisiana's 91st State House of Representatives district
Representative
Mandie Landry; D–New Orleans

Louisiana's 91st House of Representatives district is one of 105 Louisiana House of Representatives districts. It is currently represented by Democrat Mandie Landry.

== Geography ==
HD91 is located entirely inside of the city of New Orleans.

== Election results ==
Year	Winning candidate	Party	Percent	Opponent	Party	Percent
2007	Walt Leger III	Democratic	66.5%	Judy Phillips-Baloie	Democratic	33.5%
2011	Walt Leger III	Democratic	100%			
2015	Walt Leger III	Democratic	100%			
2019	Mandie Landry	Democratic	52.9%	Robert McKnight	Democratic	47.1%
2023	Mandie Landry	Democratic	65.5%	Madison O'Malley	Democratic	25.8%
