= Nathaniel Wallace =

Nathaniel Wallace may refer to:

- Nathaniel D. Wallace (1845–1894), U.S. Representative from Louisiana
- Nathaniel Clarke Wallace (1844–1901), Canadian politician and Orangeman
