= William Jefferson (politician) =

American politician (born 1947)

Bill Jefferson
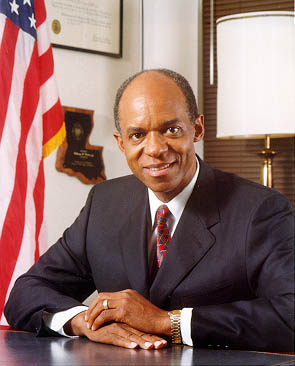

Member of the U.S. House of Representatives from Louisiana's 2nd district
- In office January 3, 1991 – January 3, 2009
- Preceded by: Lindy Boggs
- Succeeded by: Joseph Cao

Member of the Louisiana State Senate from the 5th district
- In office January 1980 – January 1991
- Preceded by: Frederick Eagan
- Succeeded by: Diana Bajoie

Personal details
- Born: William Jennings Jefferson; March 14, 1947 (age 79) Lake Providence, Louisiana, U.S.
- Party: Democratic
- Spouse: Andrea Jefferson
- Children: 5, including Jalila
- Education: Southern University, Baton Rouge (BA); Harvard University (JD); Georgetown University (LLM)

Military service
- Branch/service: United States Army
- Years of service: 1969–1975
- Rank: Second Lieutenant
- Unit: United States Army Reserve
- Jefferson's voice Jefferson supporting assistance to families impacted by Hurricane Katrina. Recorded September 8, 2005

William Jennings Jefferson (born March 14, 1947) is an American former politician from Louisiana whose career ended amid a high-profile corruption scandal and subsequent conviction. A member of the Democratic Party, he served nine terms in the U.S. House of Representatives from 1991 to 2009, representing Louisiana’s 2nd congressional district in the greater New Orleans area. He is the state’s first black congressman since the end of Reconstruction.

Beginning in 2006, Jefferson became the subject of a federal investigation into bribery and racketeering, with prosecutors alleging he used his office to solicit payments from companies seeking business deals in Africa; the probe drew national attention after agents discovered $90,000 in cash hidden in his home freezer.

Jefferson sought re-election in 2008. After his indictment in 2007, he won renomination with 56% of the vote in a runoff election. He was defeated in the general election by Republican Joseph Cao in an upset, 49.54%–46.83%, losing in a heavily Democratic district where Barack Obama received 72 percent of the vote that year.

On November 13, 2009, Jefferson was sentenced to thirteen years in federal prison for bribery, the longest sentence ever given to a congressman. He began serving that sentence in May 2012 at a Federal Bureau of Prisons (BOP) facility in Beaumont, Texas.

Jefferson appealed his case after a U.S. Supreme Court ruling on similar issues. On October 5, 2017, Jefferson was ordered released, pending sentencing or other action, after a U.S. District judge threw out seven of ten charges against him. On December 1, 2017, Judge T. S. Ellis III accepted his plea deal and sentenced Jefferson to time served.

== Early life and family ==
Jefferson was born on March 14, 1947, in Lake Providence, the parish seat of East Carroll Parish in northeastern Louisiana. He and his eight brothers and sisters worked alongside their father on their farm, and Jefferson was also a heavy-equipment operator for the United States Army Corps of Engineers. The Jeffersons were among the few African-American families in the area who in the mid-20th century owned their land (as opposed to sharecropping). They were regarded with respect, but the family struggled in poverty.

Jefferson graduated from G. W. Griffin High School in Lake Providence. In 1969, Jefferson received a bachelor's degree from Southern University, a historically black college in Baton Rouge, where he had participated in Army ROTC. In 1969 he led a protest against substandard campus facilities and negotiated a resolution of the complaint with then-Governor John J. McKeithen. On graduation from Southern University, Jefferson was commissioned a second lieutenant in the United States Army; he served in a reserve capacity until 1975. In 1972, he earned a Juris Doctor from Harvard Law School. In 1996, he received an LLM in taxation from Georgetown University Law Center in Washington, D.C.

In 1972 and 1973 Jefferson began the practice of law, having initially served as a clerk for Judge Alvin Benjamin Rubin of the United States District Court for the Eastern District of Louisiana.

Jefferson is the brother of Betty Jefferson, who became assessor for New Orleans and a Democratic field operative; Mose Jefferson, Archie Jefferson, and Brenda Jefferson Foster. He is the uncle of Angela Coleman.

Jefferson and his wife, Andrea Jefferson, have five daughters: Jamila Jefferson-Jones, Jalila Jefferson-Bullock (a former Louisiana State Representative), Jelani Jefferson Exum (a professor of law at the University of Toledo), Nailah Jefferson (a documentary filmmaker), and Akilah Jefferson. Jamila, Jalila, and Jelani are all graduates of Harvard College and Harvard Law School. Nailah is a graduate of Boston University and Emerson College. Akilah, a graduate of Brown University in Providence, Rhode Island, attends the Tulane University School of Medicine.

== Political career in New Orleans ==
From 1973 to 1975, Jefferson was a legislative assistant to Democratic U.S. Senator J. Bennett Johnston of Louisiana. Jefferson moved to New Orleans in 1976 and was elected to the Louisiana Senate in 1979, where he served until 1990. He twice unsuccessfully ran for New Orleans mayor, having, along with Ron Faucheux, first challenged Dutch Morial in the election of 1982. He was defeated by Sidney Barthelemy in the mayoral runoff of 1986. During the 1982 mayoral race, Morial attacked Jefferson by calling him "Dollar Bill". Jefferson was considered a rising star in Louisiana politics, with some suggesting he would be his state's second African-American governor.

In 1990, midway through his third term in the state senate, Jefferson ran in the nonpartisan blanket primary for Louisiana's 2nd congressional district seat after 10-term incumbent Lindy Boggs announced her retirement. He finished first in the seven-candidate field with 24 percent of the vote. In the runoff, he defeated Marc Morial, the son of Dutch Morial, with 52 percent of the vote. He was reelected seven times.

In the House, Jefferson joined the Congressional Black Caucus. He considered running for governor in 1995 but did not do so.

Jefferson ran for governor of Louisiana in the 1999 Louisiana gubernatorial election, and was the de facto "official" Democratic candidate. However, he lost badly to incumbent Republican Mike Foster, having tallied 29.5 percent of the vote and carrying only New Orleans (coextensive with Orleans Parish) and his native East Carroll Parish, whose seat is Lake Providence.

== Local influence ==
Jefferson and his family controlled one of the most sophisticated and effective get-out-the-vote organizations in South Louisiana – the Progressive Democrats. Journalist Laura Maggi has described Mose Jefferson, a brother of William, as "the man responsible for running the Progressive Democrats street operation" in New Orleans.

His opponents, Ken Carter and Jim Singleton, founded the Black Organization for Leadership Development as an alternative group. In 2002, the Progressive Democrats' support helped elect Jefferson's protégée Renée Gill Pratt to the New Orleans City Council. Jefferson's daughter Jalila was defeated by Rosalind Peychaud in a special election for Gill Pratt's District 91 seat in the Louisiana State House. She defeated Peychaud in the next regular election. Jefferson's Progressive Democrats organization also contributed to the election of Jefferson's sister Betty, as a municipal assessor, in 1998, 2002 and 2006.

New Orleans politics substantially changed in the aftermath of Hurricane Katrina in 2005, as many former residents have never returned to the city, changing the demographics of voters. A few days after Hurricane Katrina, Jefferson was reported to have used a Louisiana National Guard detachment to recover personal effects and belongings from his home. After the truck in which he and the detachment traveled became stuck, the Guard helicopter aided Jefferson's party while rescue operations in the city were still underway.

== 2006 election ==
In the ensuing 2006 election cycle for Louisiana's 2nd congressional district, eight Democrats, three Republicans, and one Libertarian challengers stood for election against Jefferson. Jefferson had been named as a subject in a corruption probe.

None of the candidates obtained more than 50% of the vote on the first ballot (November 7, 2006), forcing a runoff. The two candidates who survived the first ballot were both African-American Democrats: Jefferson got 30% of the vote, and State Representative Karen Carter, who enjoyed support from the Louisiana Democratic Party’s establishment, picked up nearly all endorsements from local politicians and the local press; she gathered 22% of the vote. Carter was Jefferson's first credible challenger since his initial run for Congress.

Political commentators predicted an easy victory for Carter on the second ballot (to be held on December 9, 2006). In the last week of campaign, however, Jefferson Parish Sheriff Harry Lee, a law and order Democrat, urged voters against Carter. She had criticized the conduct of Gretna police officers and Jefferson Parish deputies in the aftermath of Katrina, as they had prevented evacuees from fleeing New Orleans. Lee mailed out 25,000 fliers and made public statements attacking Carter. The campaign generated much controversy, highlighting racial differences between the parishes.

Voter turnout dwindled from 24.15% to 16.25%. While residents of the city of New Orleans gave Jefferson a slight majority over Carter, (51% to 49%); the Jefferson Parish share of the district voted for Jefferson by a staggering 71% to 29%, clearly swinging the election in his favor.

Following Jefferson's reelection, Speaker-elect Nancy Pelosi announced that Jefferson would not regain his seat on the Ways and Means Committee as long as he is not "cleared of wrongdoing in an ongoing federal corruption probe".

== 2008 campaign ==
In 2008, Jefferson sought re-election while under indictment for bribery. Six Democrats challenged him for the seat in the Democratic primary. The voting was delayed due to Hurricane Gustav.

In the October 4, 2008 Democratic primary, opposition to Jefferson was split among seven contenders. Some of the challengers made strong showings in their base neighborhoods but failed to garner much support in other parts of the district. Jefferson ran second, third, or even fourth in many precincts, but his 25% total was enough to give him a plurality and to send him into the runoff primary, where he faced Helena Moreno, a former TV newscaster, on November 4. Aided by overwhelming support from African-American voters on the same date as the presidential candidacy of Barack Obama drew them to the polls in unprecedented numbers, Jefferson won the Democratic nomination in the congressional party primary. Jefferson won the November 4 Democratic runoff.

The general election round occurred on December 6, 2008. Jefferson faced Republican candidate Anh "Joseph" Cao, Green Party candidate Malik Rahim, and Libertarian Party candidate Gregory Kahn. An earlier candidate, independent Jerry Jacobs, withdrew.

Jefferson was defeated in the general election on December 6, 2008 in a major upset by Republican nominee Cao, who had endorsements from several prominent Democrats including Moreno and City Councilwomen Jackie Clarkson and Stacy Head. New Orleans Mayor Ray Nagin endorsed Jefferson. Cao won by three percentage points. Jefferson was the third Democratic incumbent since the end of Reconstruction to lose to a Republican at the federal level in Louisiana. (But in Louisiana as in other parts of the South, many conservative whites left the Democratic Party for the Republican Party, and alliances have shifted.)

Jefferson's loss evoked a sensation because of the overwhelmingly Democratic nature of the district; with a Cook Partisan Voting Index of D+28, it is the third-most Democratic district in the South. Democrats usually win local and state races in landslides. Barack Obama carried the district with 72 percent of the vote in the 2008 presidential election.

Jefferson became the third African-American incumbent Congressman to be unseated in a general election.

== Corruption case ==
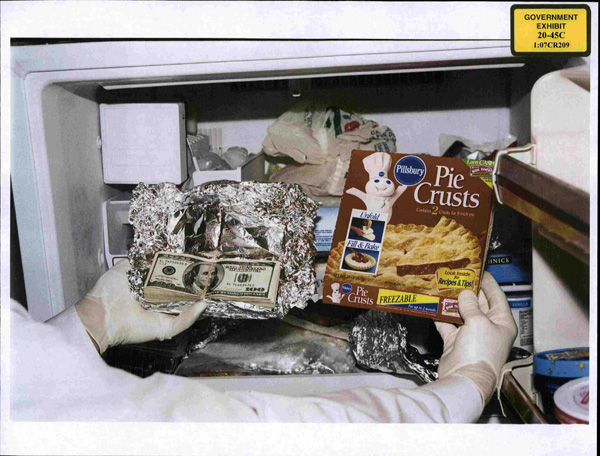
In the August 2005 raid, cash was found wrapped in aluminum foil and hidden in a box for pie crusts.

In mid-2005, an investor in the Louisville, Kentucky-based IT firm iGate pleaded guilty to conspiracy to commit bribery and the payment of $400,000 in bribes to a public official — a then-unnamed member of the U.S. House of Representatives later alleged to be Jefferson. In return for these bribes, the public official was alleged to have agreed to persuading the U.S. Army to test iGate's broadband two-way technology and other iGate products; influencing high-ranking officials in Nigeria, Ghana, and Cameroon; and meeting with personnel of the Export-Import Bank of the United States in order to facilitate potential financing for iGate business deals in those countries.

Based on these allegations, the FBI raided Jefferson's Congressional offices in May 2006. On June 4, 2007, a federal grand jury indicted Jefferson on sixteen felony charges related to corruption, including bribery, racketeering, conspiracy, money laundering, obstruction of justice and other offenses. Jefferson was defeated by Republican Joseph Cao on December 6, 2008, and became the most senior Democrat to lose re-election that year.

In 2009, he was tried in Virginia on federal corruption charges. On August 5, 2009, he was found guilty of eleven of the sixteen corruption counts. On November 13, 2009, Jefferson was sentenced to thirteen years, the longest sentence given to a congressman for bribery or any other crime.

On March 26, 2012, the U.S. Court of Appeals for the Fourth Circuit affirmed Jefferson's conviction and sentence on ten of the eleven counts on which he was convicted. The Court of Appeals vacated and remanded the conviction on one count of the indictment, involving alleged wire fraud, holding that venue on that count was improper in the federal court in Virginia.

The New Orleans Times-Picayune and its digital counterpart, NOLA.com, called former Congressman William Jefferson's 2009 conviction a "disgraceful chapter" in the state's history. The paper paid tribute to his rise from a poor upbringing to becoming a well-educated attorney but said it was necessary that he pay for his crimes. On April 20, 2012, U.S. District Court judge T. S. Ellis III revoked Jefferson's bail and ordered that he report to prison by May 4, 2012 to begin serving his thirteen-year sentence. He reported as ordered at the BOP facility in Beaumont, Texas. He was scheduled for release on August 30, 2023 but ultimately left federal prison on December 20, 2017.

Jefferson owed $5 million in legal fees and filed for bankruptcy. On May 1, 2015, Jefferson was permanently disbarred by the Supreme Court of Louisiana.

In the 2016 US Supreme Court case of McDonnell v. United States, the Court remanded the case to the lower court based on issues with the corruption charges against former Virginia Governor Bob McDonnell. The Justice Department has since dropped the case and will not prosecute again. Jefferson appealed and U.S. District Judge T. S. Ellis of the United States District Court for the Eastern District of Virginia threw out 7 of the most substantive of 10 charges against him on October 5, 2017: dropping convictions for "two counts of soliciting bribes, two counts of wire fraud, and three counts of money laundering."

The judge ordered him released while the government determined the sentence or plans for a retrial. On December 1, the government and Jefferson agreed that (1) given Judge Ellis' ruling dismissing some of the counts, one of the three remaining counts also had to be dismissed; and (2) given the time Jefferson already served in prison as well as the expense involved in continued litigation, the parties agreed that if on resentencing Judge Ellis imposed a sentence of time-served, neither party would take any further appeals from Judge Ellis' decision in which he dismissed most, but not all, of the counts against Jefferson. Judge Ellis subsequently sentenced the former congressman to time served, having spent five and a half years of his initial thirteen-year sentence in federal prison.

== Charges against relatives ==
On May 22, 2009, Betty Jefferson, Mose Jefferson, Angela Coleman, and Mose's longtime companion, former New Orleans City Councilwoman Renée Gill Pratt, were indicted for violating the Racketeer Influenced and Corrupt Organizations (RICO) Act. On June 5, 2009, all the defendants pleaded not guilty. Their sister Brenda Jefferson Foster was serving as a witness in the government's case against them. Mose Jefferson is also facing a separate trial on charges of bribing Orleans Parish School Board president Ellenese Brooks-Simms. On July 28, 2009, United States federal judge Ivan L. R. Lemelle delayed the start of the racketeering trial to January 25, 2010.

On January 10, 2010, Mose Jefferson was convicted of bribery and was sentenced to ten years imprisonment. On February 26, 2010, Betty Jefferson and Angela Coleman pleaded guilty to a single charge of conspiracy. They were expected to testify for the government in the fraud and corruption trial against Mose Jefferson and Pratt.

== Electoral history ==
=== Mayor of New Orleans, 1982 ===
Blanket primary, February 6

Candidate	Party	Votes	Outcome
Ernest Morial	Democratic	75,929 (47%)	Runoff
Ron Faucheux	Democratic	73,441 (45%)	Runoff
Bill Jefferson	Democratic	11,327 (7%)	Defeated
Others	n.a.	1,164 (1%)	Defeated

=== Mayor of New Orleans, 1986 ===
Blanket primary, February 1

Candidate	Party	Votes	Outcome
Bill Jefferson	Democratic	62,333 (39%)	Runoff
Sidney Barthelemy	Democratic	53,961 (33%)	Runoff
Sam LeBlanc	Democratic	40,963 (25%)	Defeated
Others	n.a.	4,372 (3%)	Defeated

General election, March 1

Candidate	Party	Votes	Outcome
Sidney Barthelemy	Democratic	93,050 (58%)	Elected
Bill Jefferson	Democratic	67,680 (42%)	Defeated

=== Louisiana Senate, 5th District, 1987 ===
Blanket primary, October 24

Candidate	Party	Votes	Outcome
Bill Jefferson	Democratic	No Opponents	Elected

=== U. S. Representative, 2nd Congressional District, 1990 ===
Blanket primary, October 6

Candidate	Party	Votes	Outcome
Bill Jefferson	Democratic	32,237 (24%)	Runoff
Marc Morial	Democratic	29,366 (22%)	Runoff
Jon Johnson	Democratic	25,468 (19%)	Defeated
Woody Koppel	Democratic	24,175 (18%)	Defeated
Others	n.a.	20,800 (17%)	Defeated

General election, November 6

Candidate	Party	Votes	Outcome
Bill Jefferson	Democratic	55,239 (52%)	Elected
Marc Morial	Democratic	50,232 (48%)	Defeated

=== U. S. Representative, 2nd Congressional District, 1992 ===
Blanket primary, October 3

Candidate	Party	Votes	Outcome
Bill Jefferson	Democratic	67,030 (73%)	Elected
Wilma Knox Irvin	Democratic	14,121 (15%)	Defeated
Roger C. Johnson	Independent	10,090 (11%)	Defeated

=== U. S. Representative, 2nd Congressional District, 1994 ===
Blanket primary, October 1

Candidate	Party	Votes	Outcome
Bill Jefferson	Democratic	60,906 (78%)	Elected
Bob Namer	Republican	15,113 (19%)	Defeated
Others	n.a.	5,549 (3%)	Defeated

=== U. S. Representative, 2nd Congressional District, 1996 ===
Blanket primary, September 21

Candidate	Party	Votes	Outcome
Bill Jefferson	Democratic	No Opponents	Elected

=== U. S. Representative, 2nd Congressional District, 1998 ===
Blanket primary, November 3

Candidate	Party	Votes	Outcome
Bill Jefferson	Democratic	102,247 (78%)	Elected
David Reed	Democratic	10,803 (9%)	Defeated
Don-Terry Veal	Democratic	5,899 (5%)	Defeated

=== Governor of Louisiana, 1999 ===
Blanket primary, October 23

Candidate	Party	Votes	Outcome
Mike Foster	Republican	805,203 (62%)	Elected
Bill Jefferson	Democratic	382,445 (30%)	Defeated
Others	n.a.	107,557 (8%)	Defeated

=== U. S. Representative, 2nd Congressional District, 2000 ===
Blanket primary, November 7

Candidate	Party	Votes	Outcome
Bill Jefferson	Democratic	No Opponents	Elected

=== U. S. Representative, 2nd Congressional District, 2002 ===
Blanket primary, November 5

Candidate	Affiliation	Support	Outcome
Bill Jefferson	Democratic	90,310 (64%)	Elected
Irma Muse Dixon	Democratic	28,480 (20%)	Defeated
Silky Sullivan	Republican	15,440 (11%)	Defeated
Others	n.a.	7,926 (5%)	Defeated

=== U. S. Representative, 2nd Congressional District, 2004 ===
Blanket primary, November 2

Candidate	Party	Votes	Outcome
Bill Jefferson	Democratic	173,510 (79%)	Elected
Art Schwertz	Republican	46,097 (21%)	Defeated

=== U. S. Representative, 2nd Congressional District, 2006 ===
Blanket primary, November 7

Candidate	Party	Votes	Outcome
Bill Jefferson	Democratic	27,706 (30%)	Runoff
Karen Carter Peterson	Democratic	19,972 (22%)	Runoff
Derrick Shepherd	Democratic	16,621 (18%)	Defeated
Joe Lavigne	Republican	12,405 (13%)	Defeated
Troy Carter	Democratic	11,052 (12%)	Defeated
Others	n.a.	4,661 (5%)	Defeated

General election, December 9

Candidate	Party	Votes	Outcome
Bill Jefferson	Democratic	35,153 (57%)	Elected
Karen Carter Peterson	Democratic	27,011 (43%)	Defeated

=== U. S. Representative, 2nd Congressional District, 2008 ===
Democratic primary, October 4

Candidate	Party	Votes	Outcome
Bill Jefferson	Democratic	17,510 (25%)	Runoff
Helena Moreno	Democratic	13,795 (20%)	Runoff
Cedric Richmond	Democratic	12,095 (17%)	Defeated
James Carter	Democratic	9,286 (13%)	Defeated
Byron Lee	Democratic	8,979 (13%)	Defeated
Troy Carter	Democratic	5,797 (8%)	Defeated
Kenya Smith	Democratic	1,749 (3%)	Defeated

Democratic primary runoff, November 4

Candidate	Party	Votes	Outcome
Bill Jefferson	Democratic	92,921 (57%)	Nominated
Helena Moreno	Democratic	70,705 (43%)	Defeated

General election, December 6

Candidate	Party	Votes	Outcome
Joseph Cao	Republican	33,122 (49.55%)	Elected
Bill Jefferson	Democratic	31,296 (46.82%)	Defeated
Others	n.a.	2,428 (3.63%)	Defeated

== See also ==
- List of African-American United States representatives
- List of American federal politicians convicted of crimes
- List of federal political scandals in the United States

== Footnotes ==
U.S. House of Representatives
Preceded by Lindy Boggs	Member of the U.S. House of Representatives from Louisiana's 3rd congressional district 1991–2009	Succeeded by Joseph Cao
Party political offices
Preceded by Cleo Fields	Democratic nominee for Governor of Louisiana; 1999	Succeeded by Kathleen Blanco
U.S. order of precedence (ceremonial)
Preceded by Bill Gradison as Former U.S. Representative	Order of precedence of the United States as Former U.S. Representative	Succeeded by Steve Buyer as Former U.S. Representative
