= Dorothy Mae Taylor =

American politician (1928–2000)

Dorothy Mae DeLavallade Taylor

Louisiana State Representative for District 20 (Orleans Parish)
- In office 1971–1980
- Preceded by: Ernest Nathan Morial

Member of the New Orleans City Council
- In office 1986–1994
- Succeeded by: Two at-large members: Peggy Wilson Jim Singleton

Personal details
- Born: August 10, 1928 New Orleans, Louisiana, US
- Died: August 18, 2000 (aged 72) New Orleans, Louisiana
- Party: Democratic
- Spouse(s): Johnny Taylor, Jr. (married 1948)
- Children: Seven children
- Parent(s): Charles H. and Mary Jackson DeLavallade
- Education: Southern University
- Occupation: Civil rights activist Government official

Dorothy Mae DeLavallade Taylor (August 10, 1928 – August 18, 2000), was a politician in New Orleans, the first African-American woman to be elected to and serve in the Louisiana House of Representatives. From 1971 to 1980, she represented District 20, since renumbered, in her native New Orleans.

She was active in civil rights in the 1950s and 1960s, gaining more resources for facilities for African Americans in the city. She worked in issues of health care, child care, racial discrimination and inhumane conditions in state prisons. As Director of the Central City Neighborhood Health Clinic from 1980, she also worked to develop African-American leaders among her staff, and mentored a number of future politicians in the state. In 1984 she was appointed by Governor Edwin Edwards as head of the state Department of Urban and Community Affairs, becoming the first African-American woman to hold a cabinet position.

== Political career ==
Taylor began her career in public service in the Parent Teacher Association (PTA), demanding equal supplies and funding for African American children from the Orleans Parish School Board. She was vital to the desegregation of the New Orleans Recreation Department, as well as voter registration. While working as a deputy clerk in the New Orleans Civil District Court, Taylor won a special election in 1971 to succeed Ernest Nathan Morial in the state House. He had been elected as the first black juvenile court judge in Orleans Parish.

After her election to the state house, Taylor was uneasy about being the first African-American woman to serve there. She said that she "prayed and prayed … and the answer to my fear came to me in church one Sunday morning when the choir began to sing, ‘If Jesus goes with me I’ll go anywhere.’ It was then that I knew that God had a plan and purpose for my life." Louisiana State University named Taylor in 1972 as "Legislator of the Year".

Sidney Barthelemy, another African-American political figure in New Orleans and Morial's successor as mayor, recalled that Representative Taylor had been committed to:

"criminal justice reform. She worked very hard to make sure that all people were treated fairly and humanely, especially those who were imprisoned. She felt that even those incarcerated deserved to be given basic health care and some semblance of a quality of life. After all, if we treat individuals like animals while they're incarcerated, how do you expect them to act when they are released back into the community?”

== Central City Neighborhood Health Clinic ==
After her legislative service ended in 1980, Taylor became director of the Central City Neighborhood Health Clinic, operated by the Total Community Action Agency in New Orleans. She worked to develop other African-American political leaders from these agencies, and some of her proteges went on to political office, including State Senator Henry Braden, Louisiana Public Service Commissioner Irma Muse Dixon, and state Representative Sherman Copelin. Austin Badon was an intern in Taylor's City Hall office while he attended the University of New Orleans, and later was elected to the state House.

In 1984, Taylor was appointed by third-term Governor Edwin Edwards to head the state Department of Urban and Community Affairs, the first African-American woman to hold a state cabinet position. In 1985, she received the "Humanitarian Award" from the Louisiana Association of Community Action Agencies.

In 1986, she was elected to one of two at-large positions on the New Orleans City Council. Taylor was the first African American woman elected to this seat. She held the position until reaching term-limits in 1994. She was chosen as council president in 1987. Her tenure on the council coincided with that of Mayor Barthelemy.

The final ordinance required krewe captains to sign an affidavit certifying that they are not discriminating as a condition for obtaining a parade permit. The Mistick Krewe of Comus and Momus stopped parading in New Orleans as a result of the new law, but Rex, King of the Carnival, and the Proteus krewe, after some hesitation, adopted Taylor's liberal guidelines. James Gill, daily columnist of the New Orleans Times-Picayune, referred to Taylor as "the firebrand of the New Orleans City Council."

More on Mardi Gras

In 1992 Dorothy Mae Taylor authored an ordinance insisting that all Mardi Gras krewes stop discriminating and institute an open admission policy for anyone seeking to join their organizations, if they chose to use city services to hold their parades. The reaction to this ordinance was swift and downright vicious. Old-line krewes threatened to end Mardi Gras by refusing to parade if this ordinance was enforced. Mrs. Taylor held public hearings that forced the club members to answer questions they didn't even ask in private. Nearly all of the old-line krewes were found to be “all-male and all-white”; they not only excluded Blacks but also women, gays, Jews and Italians. Embarrassed and humiliated, the krewes of Momus, Comus, and Proteus decided to follow up on their threats and issued a press release stating that they would no longer parade on the streets of New Orleans. Soon articles were being written assailing Mrs. Taylor as a racist and berated her on posters and T-shirts as “The Grinch who Stole Mardi Gras.” Racial tensions in the city reached a fevered pitch. Even so, some 15 years after the ordinance was unanimously passed by the City Council and nearly six years after Mrs. Taylor had died, certain segments of the community were still angry as evidenced in an interview given to NPR in 2006 by the city's daily newspaper columnist James Gill, “I think you cannot deny that she is remembered among white people here as the vixen who tried to destroy Mardi Gras, and who to some extent succeeded.” “I think Dorothy was just trying to protect everyone’s rights under the law,” insisted Sidney Barthelemy. “Her intent was never to destroy Mardi Gras — she simply wanted to make sure a certain class of people didn’t discriminate against others…. and that was indeed a noble cause.” “What Mrs. Taylor was simply saying is that if you benefit from public funding that you have to be accessible to the public… and the enemies to the openness of that theory spun it into something that they figured the public could relate to – so they spun it into an attack on Mardi Gras,” Jay Banks told The Louisiana Weekly. “Mrs. Taylor knew that many lucrative business deals were being made in those private clubs that most people didn’t have access to, and more times than not, it related to business deals that involved tax dollars. Those businessmen were benefiting, but if you or I were in the same business, we didn’t have the opportunity to sit at their table and have that discussion. That is how the whole thing started.” “We would write letters to the Picayune about the discrimination ordinance but none of them were ever published,” Banks told The Louisiana Weekly. “But those rants espousing hatred and viciousness always got published and it became apparent to me who the Picayune had aligned itself with – they never had any intention of showing the real issue behind the story and it is unfortunate that to many whites, this was her lasting legacy. But when it came time to stand up for what she believed in, Mrs. Taylor didn’t mind getting hit upside the head – if she thought it was the right thing to do. In hindsight it turned out to be a good thing….” Banks added. “It helped make Mardi Gras into something bigger and better than it ever was… Consider this: When Momus, Comus, and Proteus cancelled their parades, they said that they were going to move their parades to other parishes, namely Jefferson. It’s been nearly 20 years now and although Proteus has taken a step into the 21st century and returned to the parade schedule, I’m still waiting for the others to show up elsewhere… It was all a smokescreen — they used the ordinance as a scapegoat to walk away from parading when they could no longer afford to parade anyway; and the ones that stuck around are bigger and culturally friendly; and as a result Mardi Gras is better than it ever was… I believe her legacy will be long remembered if folks will just understand that she saw a wrong and simply tried to make it right. She will be remembered for the light that she was in.” (Taken from article originally published in the June 13, 2011 print edition of The Louisiana Weekly newspaper)

Taylor died in New Orleans in 2000, eight days after her 72nd birthday.

Preceded by Ernest Nathan Morial	Louisiana State Representative for District 20 (Orleans Parish); 1971–1980	Succeeded by Missing
