= Louis Charbonnet III =

Louis Charbonnet III (born March 12, 1939) is an American retired politician from the state of Louisiana. He is one of the founding members of the Louisiana Legislative Black Caucus, in 1977.

Charbonnet was born in New Orleans, in 1939, the son of Louis and Myrtle (née Labat) Charbonnet. He attended the Commonwealth Institute of Funeral Service in Houston, Texas, and worked in his family's funeral home business. He is a past president of the Louisiana State Funeral Directors' Association.

He was elected to the Louisiana House of Representatives as a Democrat for the 96th district and served from 1970 to 1984. He also served as legislative coordinator to New Orleans mayor Sidney Barthelemy. Upon his retirement from politics, he continued to work in the funeral industry. Charbonnet was inducted into the Louisiana Political Museum and Hall of Fame in 2023.
