= Louisiana's 93rd House of Representatives district =

American legislative district

Louisiana's 93rd State House of Representatives district
Representative
Alonzo Knox; D–New Orleans

Louisiana's 93rd House of Representatives district is one of 105 Louisiana House of Representatives districts. It is currently represented by Democrat Alonzo Knox.

== Geography ==
HD93 is located entirely inside of the city of New Orleans.

== Election results ==
Year	Winning candidate	Party	Percent	Opponent	Party	Percent
2011 (Note: Helena Moreno ran unopposed in the primary.)	Helena Moreno	Democratic	100%			
2015 (Note: Helena Moreno ran unopposed in the primary.)	Helena Moreno	Democratic	100%			
2018*	Royce Duplessis	Democratic	71.5%	Kenneth Bordes	Democratic	20.6%
2019	Royce Duplessis	Democratic	100%			
2023	Alonzo Knox	Democratic	54.3%	Sibil Fox Richardson	Democratic	45.7%

"*" indicated special election.
