= Derrick Shepherd =

American politician

Member of the Louisiana Senate from the 3rd district
- In office 2005–2008

Personal details
- Party: Democratic

Derrick D. T. Shepherd (born c. 1970) is an attorney and Democratic politician, formerly a member of the Louisiana Senate.

== State representative ==
Shepherd was first elected to the Louisiana House of Representatives in 2003 and took office in early 2004 as the Representative for the 87th House District. He had received 60% of the vote.

== State senator ==
In May 2005, Shepherd won a special election and became the State Senator for the 3rd District. He received 51% of the vote and succeeded Lambert Boissiere, Jr., who had won a seat on the Louisiana Public Service Commission. Shepherd was re-elected in 2007 with 61% of the vote.

As a State Senator, proposed a bill to criminalize the wearing of "saggy" pants which displayed the wearer's underwear. This bill was not passed, although the measure provided excellent material for many comedians.

== Federal politics ==
In November 2006, Shepherd ran against incumbent Bill Jefferson in Louisiana's 2nd congressional district. Jefferson, who was dogged by allegations of corruption, was facing a tough re-election fight. Shepherd finished third with 18% of the vote, behind Jefferson and Representative Karen Carter.

== Conviction for corruption ==
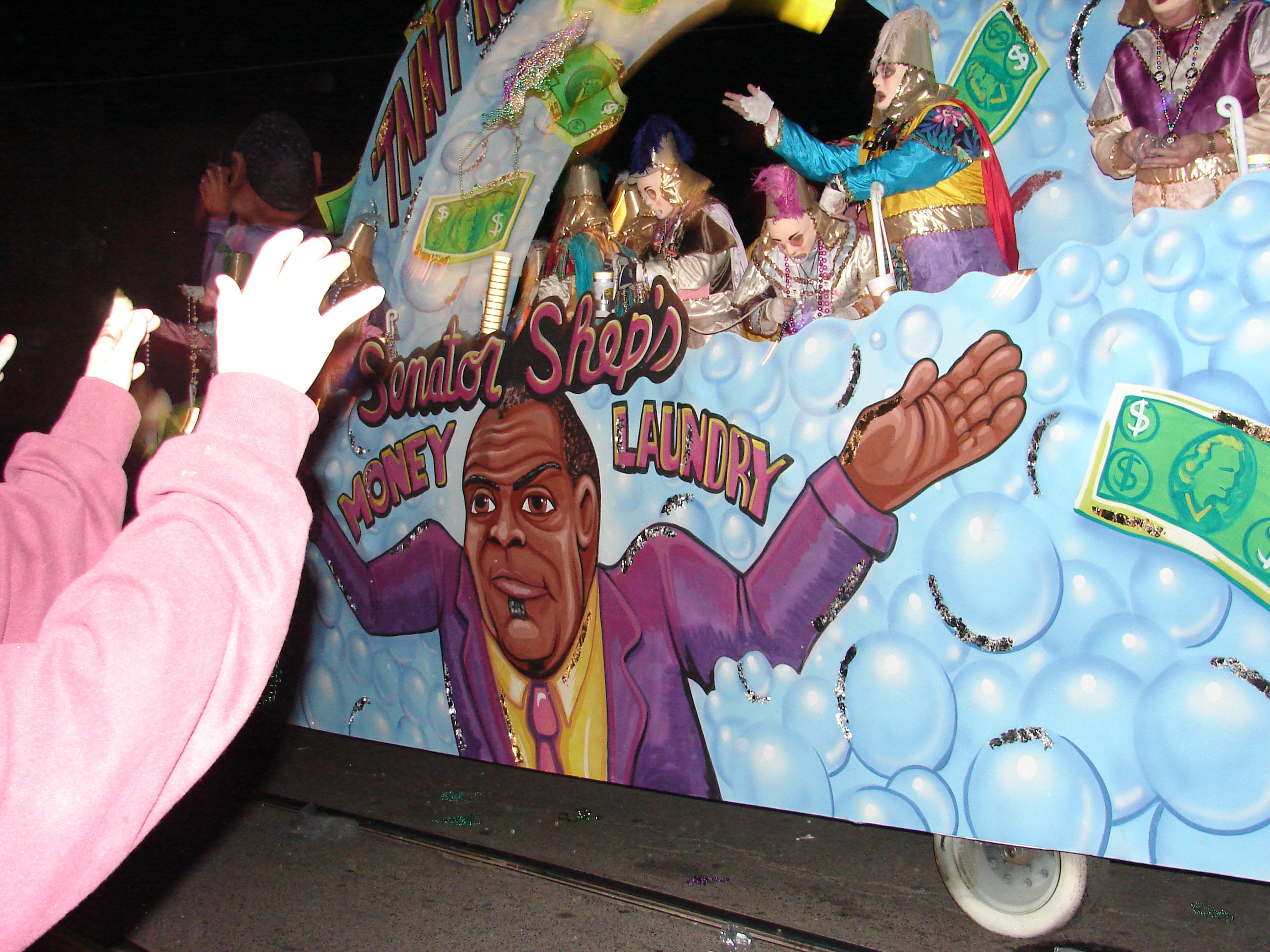
2009 Mardi Gras float lampooning Shepherd's money laundering

On April 10, 2008, Shepherd was indicted by federal investigators on charges of corruption. Shepherd allegedly engaged in a money-laundering scheme, in which he is accused of laundering $141,000 for Gwen Moyo, a former insurance broker who was barred from that business due to a felony conviction. Moyo's business accounts were frozen, so Shepherd ran the funds through his business account, retaining $65,000 for his services. He has claimed that he performed 100 hours legitimate legal services for this money ($650 an hour). The Feds dispute Shepherd's account.

On October 10, 2008, Shepherd pleaded guilty to one count of conspiracy to commit money laundering. He also resigned his state senate seat on the same day. In February 2010, Shepherd was sentenced to 37 months in prison.

== Return to Politics ==
In 2019, Shepherd ran for Council District 3 of Jefferson Parish.

Political offices
Preceded by Kyle Mark Green (D)	Louisiana Representative, 87th House District; 2004–2005	Succeeded by Terrell Harris (D)
Preceded by Lambert Boissiere, Jr. (D)	Louisiana Senator, 3rd Senate District; 2005–2008	Succeeded by vacant
