= Cheryl A. Gray Evans =

American politician from Louisiana

Member of the Louisiana Senate from the 5th district
- In office 2008–2009
- Preceded by: Diana Bajoie
- Succeeded by: Karen Carter Peterson

Member of the Louisiana House of Representatives from the 98th district
- In office 2004–2008
- Preceded by: Melinda Schwegmann
- Succeeded by: Neil Abramson

Personal details
- Born: 1968 (age 57–58) New Orleans, Louisiana, U.S.
- Party: Democratic
- Education: Stanford University; Tulane University Law School

Cheryl Artise Gray Evans (born 1968, New Orleans, Louisiana) is an American lawyer and politician. She represented District 5 in the Louisiana State Senate prior to her resignation in 2009. She formerly served in the Louisiana House of Representatives (District 98).

== Background ==
After finishing Eleanor McMain Magnet Secondary Senior High School in New Orleans, Gray proceeded to Stanford University, where she was a member of the track team and Delta Sigma Theta, receiving her baccalaureate degree in 1990. She then returned to New Orleans and received her Juris Doctor from the Tulane University Law School in 1993.

She practiced law with New Orleans' Gray & Gray Law Firm, which was started by her parents.

== Political career ==
Gray Evans is a confidant with the reform faction of the Orleans Parish Democratic Party—the element frequently identified with the Black Organization for Leadership Development (BOLD) political organization which inexorably competes against William J. Jefferson and his Progressive Democrats. Gray Evans defeated one of Jefferson's daughters, Jalila Jefferson-Bullock, for the Senate District 5 seat vacated by the term-limited Diana Bajoie, Jefferson's successor in the state Senate. She is a critic of the Federal Emergency Management Agency's handling of recovery from Hurricane Katrina.

== Personal life ==
Gray Evans' official state senate résumé lists a host of achievements, activities, awards, and memberships. She attends Asia Baptist Church in New Orleans and is married to former New Orleans television and radio news anchor/reporter Patrick Evans, who once served as Communications Director to New Orleans Mayor Ray Nagin.

Toward the end of 2009 Cheryl Gray Evans resigned from the legislature to join her husband, who had begun serving on active duty in Connecticut as a public affairs officer in the Navy.

Louisiana State Senate
Preceded by Diana Bajoie	Louisiana State Senate District 5 (Orleans Parish); 2007–2009	Succeeded by Karen Carter Peterson
