= Alonzo Knox =

American politician and businessman

Member of the Louisiana House of Representatives from the 93rd district
- Incumbent
- Assumed office March 25, 2023
- Preceded by: Royce Duplessis

Personal details
- Born: Baton Rouge, Louisiana, U.S.
- Party: Democratic
- Education: Southern University (BA); Trinity Washington University (MBA)

Military service
- Branch/service: United States Marine Corps
- Years of service: 1989–2006
- Rank: Sergeant

Alonzo L. Knox is an American politician and businessman serving as a member of the Louisiana House of Representatives for the 93rd district. He assumed office on March 25, 2023.

== Early life and education ==
Knox was born in Baton Rouge, Louisiana, and graduated from Glen Oaks High School. He earned a Bachelor of Arts degree in political science and law enforcement from Southern University and a Master of Business Administration from Trinity Washington University.

== Career ==
Knox served in the United States Marine Corps from 1989 to 2006 and became a sergeant. After leaving the Marines, Knox worked as a readjustment analyst for the United States Department of Veterans Affairs. Knox also founded the Backatown Coffee Parlour on Basin Street in New Orleans. In 2021, Knox was an unsuccessful candidate for a seat on the New Orleans City Council. In 2023, he was elected to the Louisiana House of Representatives in a special election.

== Electoral history ==
2023 Louisiana's 93rd House of Representatives district special election
Party	Candidate	Votes	%
Democratic	Sibil "Fox" Richardson	760	37.24%
Democratic	Alonzo Knox	625	30.62%
Democratic	Steven Kennedy	214	10.49%
Democratic	Morgan Clevenger	211	10.34%
Republican	Matthew M. Hill	142	6.96%
Democratic	"Naj" Wallace	89	4.36%
Total votes		2,041	100.0%

2023 Louisiana's 93rd House of Representatives district special runoff election
Party	Candidate	Votes	%
Democratic	Alonzo Knox	1,718	54.35%
Democratic	Sibil "Fox" Richardson	1,443	45.65%
Total votes		3,161	100.0%
