= Abraham Lincoln Davis =

American minister and civil rights activist

The Reverend Abraham Lincoln Davis

Member of the New Orleans City Council
- In office 1975–1977
- Preceded by: Eddie Sapir
- Succeeded by: Jim Singleton

Personal details
- Born: 1914
- Died: June 24, 1978 (aged 63–64)
- Party: Democratic

Abraham Lincoln Davis Jr. (1914 – June 24, 1978) was an American minister and leader in the civil rights movement. He led voting drives and advocated for desegregation in New Orleans, Louisiana. In 1975, Davis became the first African American member of the New Orleans City Council since the Reconstruction era.

== Early life ==
Davis was from Bayou Goula, Louisiana. His father was a Baptist minister. He moved to New Orleans and graduated from McDonogh 35 High School. He was ordained as the minister at the New Zion Baptist Church in New Orleans in 1935. He earned his Bachelor of Arts from Leland College in 1949 and earned an honorary Doctor of Divinity from the Union Baptist Theological Seminary.

== Civil rights movement ==
Davis became involved in the civil rights movement. In January 1957, he cofounded the Southern Christian Leadership Conference (SCLC) with Martin Luther King Jr. and others in his church. King served as the president of the SCLC, while Davis was vice president. The Louisiana Leadership Conference, a satellite organization of the SCLC, was formed in March 1957, with Davis and T. J. Jemison elected as its co-chairs. Associated with the SCLC, they conducted voting registration drives for African Americans.

Davis became involved in progressive politics; he supported DeLesseps Story Morrison, the mayor of New Orleans, Governor Robert F. Kennon, and Congressman Hale Boggs. He opposed Earl Long, leading a faction of anti-Long Democrats. In 1961, Morrison named Davis the first director of race relations for the city. Governor John McKeithen appointed Davis to a committee on race relations.

Morrison's successor, Victor H. Schiro, resisted desegregation, and Davis led a march of 7,000 to 10,000 on city hall on September 30, 1963. Later that week, he presented a list of demands to the New Orleans City Council. He and Reverend Avery Alexander were arrested at a sit-in at city hall in November and he continued to organize a sit-in in city hall's cafeteria and outside the mayor's office, with people getting arrested daily. The campaign was halted after 47 were arrested, including members of the Congress of Racial Equality, before Davis and Alexander got to meet with Schiro. Ultimately, the group was able to win some progress on their demands, but not on all of them.

== Political career ==
Davis ran for the Louisiana House of Representatives in the 1967 elections. He lost the December runoff election against incumbent Eugene O'Brien, receiving 4,324 votes to O'Brien's 4,442 votes.

In 1975, Davis and Jim Singleton were put forward as replacement candidates to represent District B on the New Orleans City Council, following the resignation of Eddie Sapir to serve as a city judge. Davis won the appointment by a 6–1 vote. He became the first African American to serve on the New Orleans City Council since the Reconstruction era. Davis won a special election for the remainder of Sapir's term in October 1976, but lost the 1977 election for a new term to Singleton.

== Personal life ==
Davis had a daughter. He died on June 24, 1978.
