= Charles F. Buck =

American politician (1841–1918)

Charles Francis Buck
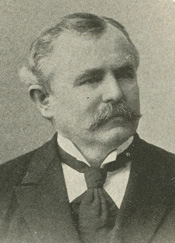
- Charles F. Buck

Member of the U.S. House of Representatives from Louisiana's 2nd district
- In office March 4, 1895 – March 4, 1897
- Preceded by: Robert Charles Davey
- Succeeded by: Robert Charles Davey

Personal details
- Born: November 5, 1841 Durrheim, Grand Duchy of Baden, Germany
- Died: January 19, 1918 (aged 76) New Orleans, Louisiana, U.S.
- Party: Democratic
- Education: Louisiana State Seminary of Learning & Military Academy
- Profession: Lawyer

Charles Francis Buck (November 5, 1841 – January 19, 1918) was a U.S. representative from Louisiana.

== Life ==
Born in Durrheim, Grand Duchy of Baden, Germany, Buck immigrated to the United States in 1852 with his parents, who settled in New Orleans, Louisiana. He graduated from the high school of New Orleans in 1861, and then attended Louisiana State Seminary of Learning & Military Academy near Pineville, Louisiana.

Turning to the law as career, Buck studied further, was admitted to the bar in 1867, and commenced practice in New Orleans, Louisiana. He served as member of the school board of New Orleans for many years and was city attorney from 1880 to 1884.

Buck was elected as a Democrat to the Fifty-fourth Congress (March 4, 1895 - March 4, 1897). He declined to be a candidate for re-election in 1896, resuming the practice of law. He was an unsuccessful candidate for mayor of New Orleans in 1896 against Citizens' League candidate Walter C. Flower and again 1904. He served as member of the supreme court board of examiners for admission to the bar 1898-1900.

Buck died in New Orleans, Louisiana, January 19, 1918, and was interred in the Metairie Cemetery.

U.S. House of Representatives
Preceded by Robert C. Davey	Member of the U.S. House of Representatives from Louisiana's 2nd congressional district 1895–1897	Succeeded by Robert C. Davey
