= Avery Alexander =

American civil rights leader and politician

The Reverend Avery C. Alexander

Member of the Louisiana House of Representatives from the 93rd district
- In office 1976 – March 5, 1999
- Succeeded by: Karen R. Carter

Personal details
- Born: Avery Caesar Alexander; June 29, 1910 Terrebonne Parish, Louisiana, U.S.
- Died: March 5, 1999 (aged 88) New Orleans, Louisiana, U.S.
- Party: Democratic
- Education: Union Baptist Theological Seminary

Religious life
- Religion: Christian
- Denomination: Baptist
- Ordination: 1944

Avery Caesar Alexander (June 29, 1910 – March 5, 1999) was an American reverend, civil rights leader and politician. He graduated from Union Baptist Theological Seminary and was ordained into the Baptist ministry in 1944. He was elected to the Louisiana House of Representatives as a Democrat in 1975 and served in that office until his death.

He participated in voter registration drives in Louisiana prior to passage of the Voting Rights Act of 1965. He helped organize boycotts against businesses in New Orleans which did not hire blacks, including a successful boycott to force the monopoly utility and transit company to hire black bus drivers.

Alexander participated in several marches with Dr. Martin Luther King Jr., and in sit-ins to integrate lunch counters. In a well-publicized and videotaped incident in the basement cafeteria at City Hall on October 31, 1963, he was arrested and dragged upstairs by the heels. In a similar incident in 1993, police used a chokehold to subdue Alexander when he participated in a protest against David Duke at the Battle of Liberty Place Monument ceremony in New Orleans after Alexander repeatedly crossed police lines separating protesters and celebrants.

== Activism ==
After becoming an ordained Baptist minister of the Union Baptist Theological Seminary. Alexander joined the NAACP to become an activist within the civil rights movement. Throughout his duration as an activist, Alexander performed many political stances upon segregation and racial discrimination in New Orleans. For instance leading bus boycotts against racial discrimination of African American employees. As well as his "lunch-counter sit-in", in 1963, aimed to integrate public cafeterias. Continually Alexander was even known to throw out wooden barriers used to racially separate whites from blacks in street cars.

In 1963, Alexander and Reverend Abraham Lincoln Davis organized a lunch-counter sit-in in the basement of New Orleans City Hall, with the goal to not leave the segregated cafeteria until they had been served a meal or arrested. For five hours Alexander and his peers sat refusing to leave. It wasn't until police arrived that Alexander and his cohorts were removed. Alexander specifically was televised being dragged by his heels up the basement's steps with his head banging on the staircase.

Furthermore, within the same time frame Alexander influenced black communities to invest their expenses into non-racial businesses. For example, white store owners located within a commercial zone on Dryades Street were prone to refuse African American employees. By Alexander advocating boycotts against similar commercial zones. Several black communities adhered to Alexander's stance and invested their money into non-racial community zones, causing many stores located on Dryades Street to go out of business.

== Legacy ==
In 1975 Alexander became a Democrat to represent the 93rd District of Louisiana House of Representatives. In 1977 he along with nine other state legislators together established the Louisiana Legislative Black Caucus as a way to increase African American state legislature ratio. Alexander also served as the chaplain of the Black caucus and due to his political and religious background became known as "The Rev". He also established a non-denominational church, the Church of All People, in 1990. He died on March 5, 1999 after being hospitalized in New Orleans after falling ill at his home.

In 1999 McDonogh #39 School on Saint Roch Avenue was renamed after him. Charity Hospital's official name is Avery C. Alexander Memorial Hospital. Pontchartrain Expressway has also been renamed in his honor. In addition, a stream in DeSoto Parish, Louisiana, was renamed to honor Alexander in 2021. Also a statue of Alexander is placed across from the New Orleans city hall where he previously boycotted in 1963 to integrate the public basement cafeteria. However, due to Hurricane Katrina the statue known as "The Crusader" was relocated and placed in front of the remodeled University Medical Center at Galvez and Canal Streets.
