= Robert C. Davey =

American politician

Robert Charles Davey
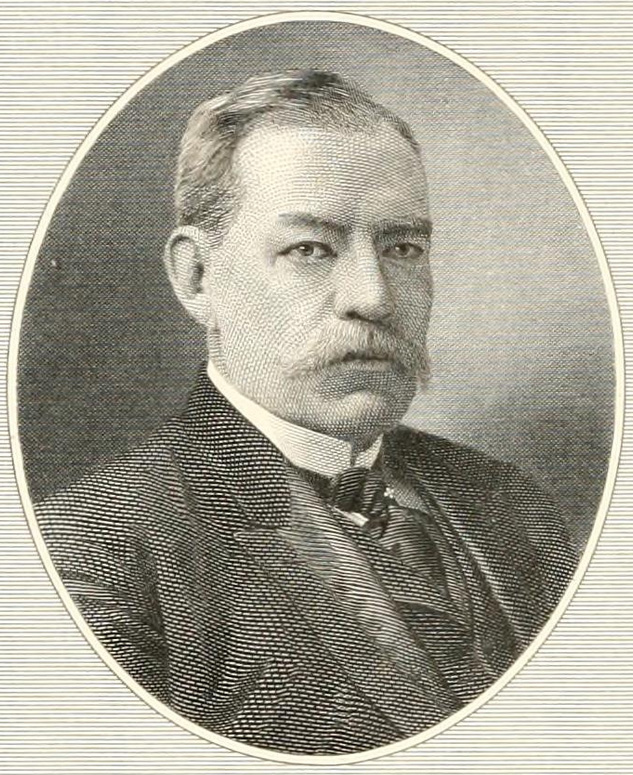
- Robert Charles Davey

Member of the U.S. House of Representatives from Louisiana's 2nd district
- In office March 4, 1893 – March 3, 1895
- Preceded by: Matthew Diamond Lagan
- Succeeded by: Charles Francis Buck

Member of the U.S. House of Representatives from Louisiana's 2nd district
- In office March 4, 1897 – December 26, 1908
- Preceded by: Charles Francis Buck
- Succeeded by: Samuel Louis Gilmore

President pro tempore of the Louisiana State Senate
- In office 1884–1886

Judge of the First Recorder's Court in New Orleans
- In office 1880–1888

Member of the Louisiana State Senate
- In office 1879–1892

Personal details
- Born: October 22, 1853 New Orleans, Louisiana
- Died: December 26, 1908 (aged 55) New Orleans, Louisiana
- Party: Democratic
- Education: St. Vincent's College, Cape Girardeau, Missouri
- Profession: Merchant, Politician, Judge

Robert Charles Davey (October 22, 1853 – December 26, 1908) was a U.S. representative from Louisiana.

Born in New Orleans, Louisiana, Davey attended the public schools, and was graduated from St. Vincent's College, Cape Girardeau, Missouri, in 1871. He engaged in mercantile pursuits.

Davey was elected to the State Senate in 1879, 1884, and again in 1892. He served as president pro tempore of the senate during the sessions of 1884 and 1886. He served as judge of the first recorder's court in New Orleans 1880-1888. He was an unsuccessful candidate for mayor of New Orleans in 1888.

Davey was elected as a Democrat to the Fifty-third Congress (March 4, 1893 – March 3, 1895). He declined to be a candidate for renomination in 1894.

Davey was elected to the Fifty-fifth and to the five succeeding Congresses and served from March 4, 1897, until his death. Had been reelected to the Sixty-first Congress, but died in New Orleans, Louisiana, December 26, 1908, before the close of the Sixtieth Congress. He was interred in Metairie Cemetery.

== See also ==
- List of members of the United States Congress who died in office (1900–1949)

U.S. House of Representatives
Preceded by Matthew D. Lagan	Member of the U.S. House of Representatives from Louisiana's 2nd congressional district 1893–1895	Succeeded by Charles F. Buck
Preceded by Charles F. Buck	Member of the U.S. House of Representatives from Louisiana's 2nd congressional district 1897–1908	Succeeded by Samuel L. Gilmore
