= Thomas Jasper (politician) =

Member of the U.S. House of Representatives from Louisiana's 102 district
- In office 1977–1980

Personal details
- Born: February 23, 1929 (age 97) New Orleans
- Party: Democratic Party (United States)
- Spouse: Florence Harrell

Thomas Jasper (born February 23, 1929) is an American retired politician from the state of Louisiana. He is one of the founding members of the Louisiana Legislative Black Caucus, in 1977.

Jasper was born in New Orleans, on February 23, 1929, the son of Samuel and Louise Jasper. He graduated from Southern University at New Orleans and was an accountant by profession. He was elected to the Louisiana House of Representatives as a Democrat for district 102 in 1976, serving from 1977 to 1980. He also served on the New Orleans State Central Democratic Committee, and as a delegate to the Democratic National Convention. He is married to Florence Harrell and has three children.
