= Jalila Jefferson-Bullock =

American politician (born 1975)

Member of the Louisiana House of Representatives for the 91st District
- In office 2004–2007
- Preceded by: Rosalind Peychaud
- Succeeded by: Walt Leger III

Personal details
- Born: 1975 (age 50–51) Silver Spring, Maryland, U.S.
- Relations: William J. Jefferson (father)
- Education: Harvard University (B.A., J.D.); University of Chicago (M.A.)

Jalila Eshe Jefferson-Bullock (born 1975) is an American lawyer and politician who served as a state representative in the Louisiana House of Representatives from 2004 to 2007, representing House District 91. Jefferson-Bullock won the seat from Rosalind Peychaud in a general election after losing to Peychaud in an earlier special election.

== Education ==
After finishing Benjamin Franklin High School in New Orleans, Jefferson-Bullock obtained a B.A. in English from Harvard University. She received a master's degree in humanities from the University of Chicago and then a juris doctor from Harvard Law School. She is a member of American Bar Association.

== Campaigns for office ==
Jefferson-Bullock was a delegate to the Democratic National Convention in 2004. After defeating Peychaud for House District 91 in 2005, in 2007 Jefferson-Bullock sought to represent State Senate District 5 but was defeated by Cheryl A. Gray Evans.

== ANJ Group ==
Jefferson-Bullock's father is convicted felon and former U.S. Representative, William J. Jefferson. Records released by the Federal Bureau of Investigation in 2009 revealed that the private institutions Jalila and her sisters attended were the beneficiaries bribes paid to ANJ Group in exchange for the lawmaker's help in securing contracts for American companies in West Africa. ANJ Group LLC is "a company controlled by Jefferson's family" according to The Times-Picayune/The New Orleans Advocate.

Political offices
| Preceded by Rosalind Peychaud (D) | Louisiana Legislature House District 91 (Orleans Parish); 2004–2007 | Succeeded by Walt Leger III (D) |
