= Louisiana Legislative Black Caucus =

The Louisiana Legislative Black Caucus, (also known as the LLBC) is an American political organisation composed of African Americans elected to the Louisiana Legislature.

== Priorities ==
The primary purpose of the LLBC is to raise the quality of life for African Americans, the indigent and working people through legislation, education and economic development. To fulfill these priorities the following goals were set by the LLBC:

- Enacting legislation that positively impacts and repealing legislation that negatively impacts the Black Caucus' constituencies.
- Implementing and promoting policies which allow all citizens fair and open access to educational and economical advancement opportunities.
- Providing leadership in challenging policies which hinder the progress of African Americans.
- Organizing and maintaining a networking system in Louisiana that links together elected officials, faith-based and civic organizations, businesses and colleges and universities for identifying cutting-edge issues that affect Louisiana's African American citizenry.
- Developing and implementing community-based programs, meetings and forums for the distribution of information.
- Serving as a united public voice for the African American population in Louisiana.

== Current membership ==
Officers are elected from within the Caucus with equal representation from both the House and Senate members.

=== Officers ===
District	Officers	Position
16 (House)	Katrina R. Jackson	Chair
58 (House)	Ed Price	Vice Chair
3 (House)	Barbara Norton	Secretary
17 (House)	Marcus Hunter	Treasurer
44 (House)	Vincent Pierre	Parliamentarian
2 (House)	Roy Burrell	Sergeant at Arms
14 (Senate)	Yvonne Dorsey Colomb	Senate Whip
11 (House)	Patrick O. Jefferson	Chaplain

=== Members ===
- Louisiana State Rep. Karen Carter Peterson (D-New Orleans)
- Louisiana State Rep. Rick Gallot, Jr. (D-Ruston) (elected to state Senate, 2011)
- Louisiana State Rep. Avon Honey (D-Baton Rouge)
- Louisiana State Sen. Lydia P. Jackson (D-Shreveport) (defeated 2011)

== History ==
The LLBC was established in 1977. The ten founders of LLBC were Rev. Avery C. Alexander, Diana E. Bajoie, Sidney Barthelemy, Louis Charbonnet, III, Nick Connor, Joseph A. Delpit, Alphonse Jackson, Johnny Jackson, Jr., Thomas Jasper, and Richard Turnley, Jr. The number of African-American legislators has increased tremendously since the inception of the LLBC.

Currently the Louisiana Legislature has thirty-two (32) African-American members consisting of nine (9) senators and twenty-two (22) representatives.
