= Matthew D. Lagan =

American politician

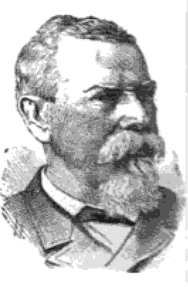

Member of the U.S. House of Representatives from Louisiana's 2nd district
- In office March 4, 1891 – March 3, 1893
- Preceded by: Hamilton D. Coleman
- Succeeded by: Robert C. Davey
- In office March 4, 1887 – March 3, 1889
- Preceded by: Nathaniel D. Wallace
- Succeeded by: Hamilton D. Coleman

Personal details
- Born: Matthew Diamond Lagan; June 20, 1829 Maghera, Ireland
- Died: April 8, 1901 (aged 71) New Orleans, Louisiana
- Resting place: Metairie Cemetery, New Orleans
- Party: Democratic

Matthew Diamond Lagan (June 20, 1829 – April 8, 1901) was a U.S. representative from Louisiana's 2nd congressional district from 1887 to 1889 and 1891 to 1893. He was a Democrat.

Lagan was born in Maghera, County Londonderry, Ireland, and immigrated to the United States at age 14. In New Orleans, he fitted out vessels for the Confederate Navy, and served in the Confederate Navy himself. He was elected to terms on the New Orleans City Council in 1867 and 1882. After serving his first term in Congress, he chose not to run for reelection, but then ran in 1890 and defeated his successor, Hamilton D. Coleman.

Lagan died in New Orleans, Louisiana on April 8, 1901, and is buried in Metairie Cemetery.

U.S. House of Representatives
Preceded by Nathaniel D. Wallace	Member of the U.S. House of Representatives from Louisiana's 2nd congressional district March 4, 1887 – March 3, 1889	Succeeded by Hamilton D. Coleman
Preceded by Hamilton D. Coleman	Member of the U.S. House of Representatives from Louisiana's 2nd congressional district March 4, 1891 – March 3, 1893	Succeeded by Robert C. Davey
