= Citizens' League =

Political organization in Louisiana

The Citizens' League was a political organization in New Orleans, Louisiana that successfully campaigned on a platform of reforms in the 1896 election. Its ticket won a decisive victory and a bevy of municipal offices as well as seats in the state legislature. They instituted various reforms related to New Orleans and its governance. It organized armed patrols to guard balloting. It sought removal of political leaders from city payrolls and advocated for secret balloting. The group's candidate for mayor Walter C. Flower was elected mayor. They won support from Black voters. In 1900 the Democratic Party regrouped and retook power. It disenfranchised African Americans.

Twenty-seven Citizens' League candidates were elected from Orleans Parish to the state legislature. They sided with Democrats over a Populist-Republican alliance disputing state senate elections.

William Mayo Railey was a leader of the group. It took on gambling. The League organized in opposition to New Orleans mayor John Fitzpatrick and corrupt city council members. Its ticket was successful in the 1896 election.

Charles Janvier served as the group's president and Pearl Wight as its vice-president. It opposed dead people registered to vote and voting by proxy. It sought a new city charter. Focused on municipal elections and reform in New Orleans, it ran candidates for the state legislature to help work on its goals.

Walter C. Flower's decisive victory in the mayoral election was over Democratic lawyer and congressman Charles F. Buck.

== See also ==
- Storyville, New Orleans
