= Louisiana's 5th State Senate district =

American legislative district

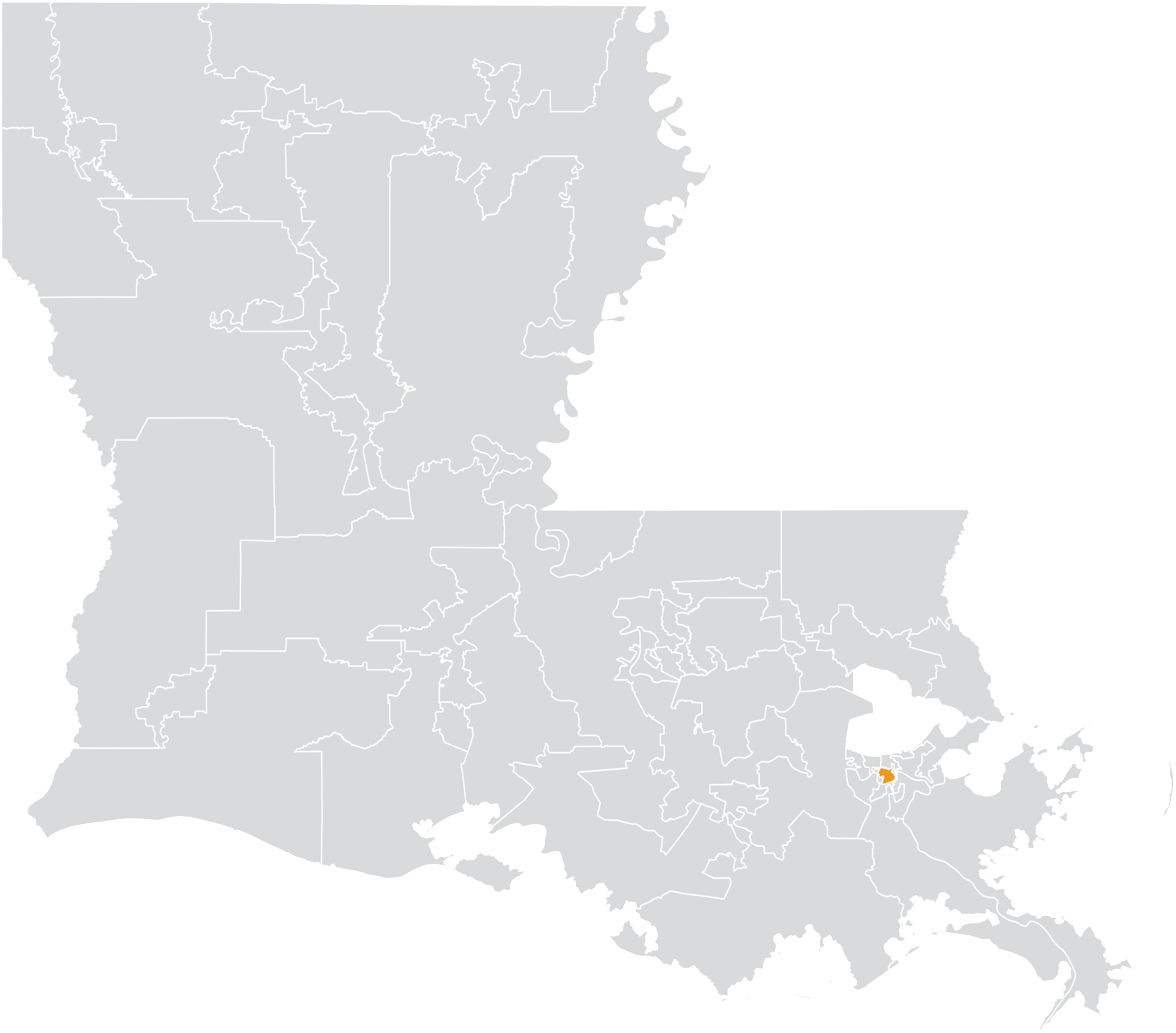
Senator
Royce Duplessis; D–New Orleans
- Registration: 61.2% Democratic; 10.1% Republican; 28.7% No party preference
- Demographics: 40% White; 48% Black; 7% Hispanic; 2% Asian; 2% Other
- Population (2019): 123,489
- Registered voters: 81,210

Louisiana's 5th State Senate district is one of 39 districts in the Louisiana State Senate. The district is represented by Democrat Royce Duplessis. The district was previously represented by Democrat Karen Carter Peterson from a 2010 special election to replace resigning fellow Democrat Cheryl Gray Evans until Peterson's resignation in April 2022. Diana Bajoie represented the district from 1991 to 2008. It is currently the most Democratic-leaning district in the Senate.

== Geography ==
District 5 is primarily located in New Orleans, including parts of Carrollton, the Garden District, Mid-City New Orleans, and Uptown New Orleans, stretching to also cover a small part of Jefferson Parish.

The district overlaps with Louisiana's 1st and 2nd congressional districts, and with the 82nd, 91st, 93rd, 97th, and 98th districts of the Louisiana House of Representatives.

At 15 square miles, it is the smallest Senate district in Louisiana.

== Recent election results ==
Louisiana uses a jungle primary system. If no candidate receives 50% in the first round of voting, when all candidates appear on the same ballot regardless of party, the top-two finishers advance to a runoff election.

=== 2019 ===
2019 Louisiana State Senate election, District 5
Party	Candidate	Votes	%
Democratic	Karen Carter Peterson (incumbent)	20,867	79.4
Democratic	Allen Borne Jr.	5,412	20.6
Total votes		26,279	100

=== 2015 ===
2015 Louisiana State Senate election, District 5
Party	Candidate	Votes	%
Democratic	Karen Carter Peterson (incumbent)	Unopposed	100
Total votes		Unopposed	100
Democratic hold			

=== 2011 ===
2011 Louisiana State Senate election, District 5
Party	Candidate	Votes	%
Democratic	Karen Carter Peterson (incumbent)	Unopposed	100
Total votes		Unopposed	100
Democratic hold			

=== Federal and statewide results ===
Year	Office	Results
2020	President	Biden 85.9–12.1%
2019	Governor (runoff)	Edwards 91.9–8.1%
2016	President	Clinton 83.1–11.9%
2015	Governor (runoff)	Edwards 89.2–10.8%
2014	Senate (runoff)	Landrieu 86.9–13.1%
2012	President	Obama 82.0–15.5%
