= Hamilton D. Coleman =

American politician (1845–1926)

Hamilton Dudley Coleman
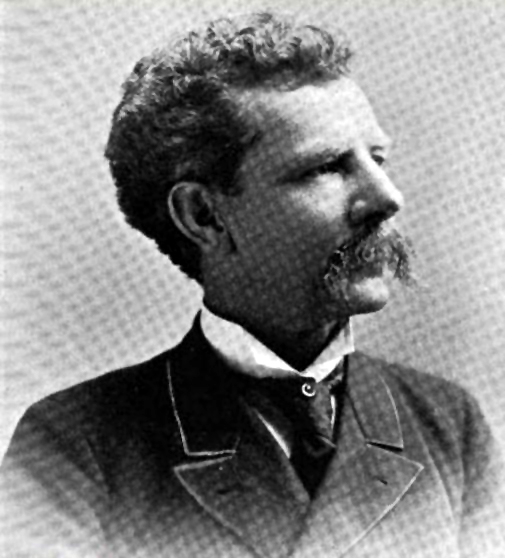

Member of the U.S. House of Representatives from Louisiana's 2nd district
- In office March 4, 1889 – March 3, 1891
- Preceded by: Matthew D. Lagan
- Succeeded by: Matthew D. Lagan

Personal details
- Born: May 12, 1845 New Orleans, Louisiana, U.S
- Died: March 16, 1926 (aged 80) Biloxi, Mississippi, U.S.
- Resting place: Metairie Cemetery in New Orleans, Louisiana
- Party: Republican
- Occupation: Businessman

Military service
- Branch/service: Confederate Army
- Unit: Army of Northern Virginia

Hamilton Dudley Coleman (May 12, 1845 – March 16, 1926) was a businessman and politician who served one term between 1889 and 1891 in the United States House of Representatives representing Louisiana's 2nd congressional district (New Orleans).

Coleman served in the Washington Artillery in the Army of Northern Virginia during the American Civil War and was part of the Confederate Army that surrendered at Appomattox, Virginia.

He returned to New Orleans and became a manufacturer and dealer of farm equipment, and an organizer of New Orleans's first electric lighting company. He was elected as a Republican to Congress in 1888, but lost his bid for reelection in 1890 to Matthew D. Lagan, the previous holder of the seat. Coleman was the last Republican to represent Louisiana in Congress until David C. Treen in 1973. Coleman was the last Republican to represent New Orleans in the House until Joseph Cao was elected in 2008.

Coleman also ran for governor and lieutenant governor, losing both races. From 1899 to 1905, he was the melter and refiner for the New Orleans Mint. He died in Biloxi in 1926 and is interred at Metairie Cemetery in New Orleans.

- United States Congress. "Hamilton D. Coleman (id: C000619)". Biographical Directory of the United States Congress. Retrieved on 2009-04-16

U.S. House of Representatives
Preceded by Matthew D. Lagan	Member of the U.S. House of Representatives from Louisiana's 2nd congressional district 1889–1891	Succeeded by Matthew D. Lagan
