= Nathaniel D. Wallace =

American politician

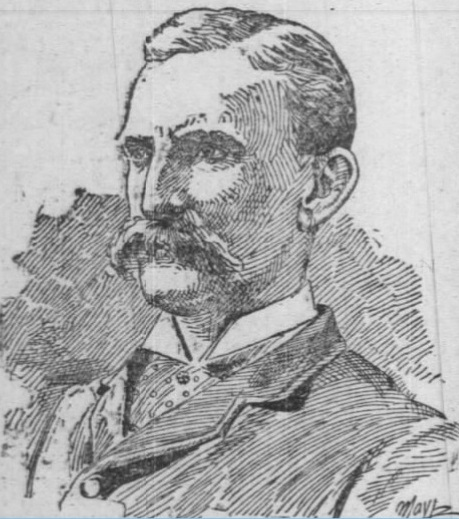
- The Times-Democrat (New Orleans, Louisiana), July 17, 1894

Member of the U.S. House of Representatives from Louisiana's 2nd district
- In office December 9, 1886 – March 3, 1887
- Preceded by: Michael Hahn
- Succeeded by: Matthew D. Lagan

Personal details
- Born: Nathaniel Dick Wallace; October 27, 1845 Columbia, Tennessee, U.S.
- Died: July 16, 1894 (aged 48) Asheville, North Carolina, U.S.
- Resting place: Metairie Cemetery, New Orleans,
- Party: Democratic
- Education: Trinity College Dublin

Nathaniel Dick Wallace (October 27, 1845 – July 16, 1894) was a U.S. representative from Louisiana.

Born in Columbia, Tennessee, Wallace attended the common schools and graduated from Trinity College Dublin in 1865. He returned to the United States in 1867 and engaged in the commission business in New Orleans, Louisiana, in 1878. He was twice elected president of the New Orleans Produce Exchange and was active in manufacturing enterprises.

Wallace was elected as a Democrat to the Forty-ninth Congress to fill the vacancy caused by the death of Michael Hahn and served from December 9, 1886, to March 3, 1887. He was not a candidate for renomination in 1886 to the Fiftieth Congress. He served as president of Consumers Ice Co., New Orleans, from 1886 until his death on July 16, 1894, in Kenilworth, a neighborhood of Asheville, North Carolina. He was interred in Metairie Cemetery, New Orleans, Louisiana.

U.S. House of Representatives
Preceded by Michael Hahn	Member of the U.S. House of Representatives from Louisiana's 2nd congressional district December 9, 1886 – March 3, 1887	Succeeded by Matthew D. Lagan
