= Jim Singleton =

American politician (born 1931)

James Milton Singleton (born 1931 in Hazlehurst, Mississippi), a prime mover in the New Orleans political organization BOLD (Black Organization for Leadership Development) and previously served on the nine-member Louisiana Gaming Control Board, having been nominated for the position by Xavier University of Louisiana president Norman Francis and appointed by Governor Bobby Jindal.

== Political career ==
In 1975, Singelton and Abraham Lincoln Davis were put forward as replacement candidates to represent District B on the New Orleans City Council, following the resignation of Eddie Sapir to serve as a city judge. Davis won the appointment by a 6–1 vote. Singleton challenged Davis in the 1977 election for a new term, and Singleton defeated Davis.

In last election to the body was in 1998, when he and Sapir edged out the Republican councilwoman, Peggy Wilson. Singleton's tenure on the council ended in 2002, when he instead unsuccessfully sought the office of mayor. The winner, Ray Nagin, immediately sought Singleton's help with managing the city's finances, an arena where Singleton was considered especially knowledgeable. Singleton and his BOLD allies, starting with BOLD co-founder Ken Carter and his daughter Karen Carter Peterson, were historically aligned in opposition to former mayor Marc Morial.

== Opposition to Bill Jefferson ==
Since Morial's departure Singleton's allies have most notably been observed as opponents of the Progressive Democrats (the organization supporting William J. Jefferson and his political associates). The dynamics have meant that BOLD, although explicitly the Black Organization for Leadership Development, supports white candidates when expedient, from the BOLD perspective, for the overall good of the African-American community. Thus Singleton and BOLD have at times been sympathetic to white candidates (such as Stacy Head and Helena Moreno) when the alternative has been Jefferson or a member of the Progressive Democrats. Singleton has also been on good terms with Republicans such as Governor Jindal (who appointed Singleton to the Gaming Control Board) and U.S. Representative Joseph Cao, who in 2008 thwarted Jefferson's reelection to Congress; the geographical district which Singleton represented on the Gaming Control Board is congruent to Cao's 2nd congressional district of Louisiana.

== Personal life ==
Singleton belongs to the NAACP and the National Urban League. He is married to Allie Mae Y. Singleton. Jim and Allie Singleton have two children and two grandchildren.
