= Walt Leger III =

American politician (born 1978)

Walt Leger

Speaker pro tempore of the Louisiana House of Representatives
- In office January 9, 2012 – January 13, 2020
- Preceded by: Joel Robideaux
- Succeeded by: Tanner Magee

Member of the Louisiana House of Representatives from the 91st district
- In office January 14, 2008 – January 13, 2020
- Preceded by: Jalila Jefferson-Bullock
- Succeeded by: Mandie Landry

Personal details
- Born: Walter John Leger III; June 22, 1978 (age 48)
- Party: Democratic
- Spouse: Danielle Doiron
- Education: Louisiana State University (BA); Tulane University (JD)

Walter John Leger III, known as Walt Leger (born June 22, 1978; surname pronounced leh-ZHAY), was Speaker pro tempore of the Louisiana House of Representatives and the representative for District 91, which includes Central City, Uptown, the Lower Garden District, the Irish Channel, parts of Broadmoor, Gert Town, and Hollygrove in New Orleans, Louisiana. Leger is a member of the Democratic Party.

Leger was the choice of Governor John Bel Edwards to become Speaker, effective January 11, 2016. By custom, the governor chose the House Speaker in Louisiana, but lawmakers on a second ballot instead chose another Republican Speaker, Taylor Barras of New Iberia. The House retained Leger for another term as Speaker pro tempore.

== Personal life and education ==
Leger is the oldest of three children of Walter, Jr., and Cathy Buras Vidos. He is married to the former Danielle Marie Doiron of Houma in Terrebonne Parish and the father of Catherine "Cate" Victoria Leger born in 2016 and Caroline Marie Leger born in 2018. Leger was born and raised in St. Bernard Parish in Arabi, Louisiana. Leger graduated summa cum laude from Jesuit High School (New Orleans) in 1996 and went on to receive his B.A. in political science from Louisiana State University in 2000, and Juris Doctor from Tulane University School of Law in 2003 with a Certificate in Admiralty and Maritime Law. At Tulane he served as the 1L class President, the Student Bar association Vice-President, the Editor-in-chief of the Tulane Environmental Law Newsletter and as Business Editor of the Tulane Maritime Law Journal. In 2018, Leger was recognized as the Young Alumnus of the Year by his alma mater, Louisiana State University and inducted into the Hall of Distinction.

During his time at LSU, his passion for public service was ignited while working for U.S. Senator John Breaux in Washington D.C. After graduating with many honors, he returned to New Orleans and attended Tulane University Law School, where he earned his Juris Doctor with a certificate of specialization in Admiralty & Maritime Law in 2003. Additionally, he served as a Judicial Intern for the Honorable Judge Morey Leonard Sear, United States District Judge for the Eastern District of Louisiana. He has been called upon to lecture at Continuing Legal Education programs for lawyers and has also lectured at Tulane University Law School, Loyola University New Orleans College of Law, Tulane University, and the Loyola University New Orleans's Institute of Politics.

== Career ==
=== Law ===
Beginning his career as an Assistant District Attorney in New Orleans, Walt Leger tried countless jury and judge trials. He has prosecuted violent offenders and drug traffickers, maintaining a conviction rate of over 90%. He has held leadership roles in the Louisiana State and New Orleans Bar Associations and is now an attorney at the law firm of Leger & Shaw, where he has a litigation practice focusing on admiralty & maritime law and commercial, insurance, and complex civil litigation. He has been recognized as a Superlawyer and appeared on the List of Best Lawyers in New Orleans. Leger regularly lectures at Continuing Legal Education seminars and is an adjunct professor of Law at Loyola University School of Law in New Orleans.

=== Politics ===
In 2007, Leger was elected state representative for Louisiana House District 91, he was re-elected without opposition in 2011 and 2015, and went on to become the youngest member to ever serve as Speaker Pro Tempore of the Louisiana House of Representatives in January 2011 after having been elected to the position by acclimation of the House.

In 2015, after being defeated in a hotly contested election for Speaker of the House, Leger was re-elected Speaker Pro Tempore for a second term, again by acclimation of his House colleagues. As Speaker, Walt Leger moderates debate, makes rulings on procedure, announces the results of votes, etc. and is in the second highest position of the House. In Legislature, he has served on the powerful Appropriations Committee, the Criminal Justice Committee, the Education Committee, the Judiciary Committee, the Joint Legislative Committee on the Budget, the House Executive Committee, the Juvenile Justice Implementation Commission, the House Committee on Homeland Security, and the Technology Sub-Committee of the House Executive Committee.

For nearly a decade, Leger has worked to reform the State's criminal justice system, to ensure that every public safety tax dollar is spent efficiently and productively. In 2015, he created the Criminals justice Reinvestment Taskforce that in partnership with Pew Center for States has created a 2017 legislative package that is projected to save the state over $300 million in the next decade, reducing the prison population, reinvesting more than half of those savings in anti-recidivism programming, and driving the crime rate down. As proven in Southern states over he past decade, these types of reforms are fiscally sound and actually make communities safer.

In October 2012, he was elected to the Chairmanship of the Southern Rail Commission (formerly known as the Southern High Speed Rail Commission), which is made up of representatives of the States of Louisiana, Mississippi, and Alabama.

Leger is currently serving as the Co-Chairman of the National Conference of State Legislature's Committee on Health and Human Services. He also serves on the Executive Committee of the Council of State Governments, the Steering Committee of "Fix the Debt" Louisiana, a Chapter of the National Coalition to put America on a better fiscal and economic path.

He served on the Council of State Government's Justice Center's School Discipline Taskforce, the Southern Rail Commission, the Louisiana Super-Regional Rail Compact, Chairman of the Louisiana Witness Protection Services Board, former Chairman of the Juvenile Justice Implementation of Commission, the Energy Council, and on the Board of the Louisiana Judicial College, among other leadership positions.

Today, Walt Leger's priorities include being smart on crime, creating jobs, fighting for fairness & equity, improving educational opportunities, protecting New Orleans' coast, and making smart investments in infrastructure. One recent example of proactive legislature includes his 2013 bill to allow the governing boards of all four public college systems of New Orleans to increase tuition and fees under a uniform policy that would be determined by the Louisiana Board of Regents, which oversees higher education in the state. Leger's goal was to guarantee a more reliable revenue stream for the institutions, whose state share of funding has been declining in recent years. The bill was approved 13-4 in the House Education Committee. His awards include:

- 2019 Louisiana Institute for Children in Families, Statewide Angel in Adoption Award
- 2019 Policy Institute for Children, Legislative Champion
- 2019 Horsemen's Benevolent & Protective Association, Triple Crown Award
- 2019 Friend of Hospitality Industry Award
- 2019 Historic Tax Credit Champion Award
- 2019 Chamber Southwest Louisiana, Legis-gator Business Champion
- 2018 Louisiana State University, Hall of Distinction Inductee, Young Alumnus of the Year
- 2018 Public Service Award, Louisiana Association for Justice
- 2018 Rural Jobs Coalition, Louisiana Legislator of the Year
- 2018 Regional Policy Award for Coastal Restoration, Ecological Society of America
- 2018 Louisiana Budget Project, Legislative Leadership Award
- 2018 National Academy of Recording Arts and Sciences, Champion of Music Award
- 2017 Life and Liberty Award, Louisiana Family Forum for Achievement in Criminal Justice Reform
- 2017 Champion for Children, Childcare Association of Louisiana
- 2017 Chamber Southwest Louisiana, Legis-gator Business Champion
- 2016 Outstanding National Achievement in State Tax Reform by the Tax Foundation
- 2016 Business Champion Award from the Chamber of Southwest Louisiana
- 2016 Re-Elected Speaker Pro Tempore, Louisiana House of Representatives
- 2015 Champion for Children, Childcare Association of Louisiana
- 2015 Whole Child Champion, Early Childhood & Family Learning Foundation
- 2015 Legislative Champion, Louisiana Industrial Development Executives Association
- 2015 Outstanding Legislator, LSU Health Sciences Center Foundation
- 2015 Business Champion Award from the Chamber of Southwest Louisiana
- 2015 LSU Greek Excellence Award, Louisiana State University
- 2015 Education Choice Champion by Louisiana Federation for Children
- 2014 Legislative Champion of the Year, Louisiana Primary Care Association
- 2014 Vocational Rehabilitation Champion, Louisiana Rehabilitation Council
- 2014 Legislative Champion, Louisiana Industrial Development Executives Association
- 2014 Transit Champion, Ride New Orleans
- 2014 Legislator of the Year, Childcare Association of Louisiana
- 2014 Business Champion Award from the Chamber of Southwest Louisiana
- 2014 Legislative Leadership Award, Citizens for 1 Greater New Orleans
- 2014 Preservation Partner by Louisiana Trust for Historic Preservation
- 2014 Champion of the Coast Award by the Meraux Foundation
- 2014 Mondale-Brooke Award for Fair Housing Leadership and Civic Participation by the Greater New Orleans Fair Housing Action Center
- 2013 Libby Milton Champion for Children Award, Kingsley House
- 2013 Business Champion Award from the Chamber of Southwest Louisiana
- 2013 Legislative Champion by Louisiana Industrial Development Executives Association
- 2013 Champion of Small Business by National Coalition for Capital
- 2013 Legislator of the Year, Novogradac Journal of Tax Credits Community Development Awards
- 2013 Inaugural Film and Entertainment Advocacy Award from the Louisiana Film and Entertainment Association
- 2013 Champion of Small Business Award from the National Coalition for Capital
- 2012 Elected as Speaker Pro Tempore of the Louisiana House of Representatives
- 2012 Louey Award for Legislative Leadership from the Louisiana Tourism Industry and the Louisiana Travel Promotion Association
- 2012 Outstanding Legislator Award from Victims & Citizens Against Crime, Inc.
- 2012 Elected as Chairman of the Southern Rail Commission
- 2012 Advocate of the Year from the Louisiana Restaurant Association
- 2012 Business Champion Award from the Chamber of Southwest Louisiana
- 2011 Legislator of the Year by the Alliance for Good Government
- 2011 Business Champion Award from the Chamber of Southwest Louisiana
- 2011 Crimestoppers Champion Award
- 2010 Legislative Champion Award by the Louisiana Council of YMCAs
- 2010 National Award for Leadership in Juvenile Justice Reform from the National Juvenile Justice Network
- 2010 Nurse-Family Partnership Champions Award
- 2010 Business Champion Award from the Chamber of Southwest Louisiana
- 2009 Legislator of the Year Award by the Louisiana Partnership for Children and Families

In 2017, Leger introduced HB490, a bill that would create an Advisory Council on Heroin and Opioid Prevention and Education in Louisiana, in response to the national opioid abuse epidemic. It was passed into law and signed by the governor on June 12, 2017.

=== Public service ===
Walt Leger has served on the board of directors for the St. Bernard Parish Chapter of the American Red Cross, as well as for the Louisiana not for profit DesireNOLA, and on the Board of Directors for Total Community Action, Inc. Walt currently serves on the Board of Directors of the Louisiana Institute for Children in Families, Louisiana Children's Museum, GNO, Inc., and the New Orleans Chamber of Commerce. He is a member of the Council on Criminal Justice and a member of the Advisory Board for the Coalition to Restore Coastal Louisiana, Geaux for Kids, Inc. and the Louisiana State University Ogden Honor's College.

== Notes ==
Louisiana House of Representatives
Preceded by Jalila Jefferson-Bullock	Member of the Louisiana House of Representatives from the 91st district 2008–2020	Succeeded by Mandie Landry
Preceded by Joel Robideaux	Speaker pro tempore of the Louisiana House of Representatives; 2012–2020	Succeeded by Tanner Magee
