= Mandie Landry =

American politician

Member of the Louisiana House of Representatives from the 91st district
- Incumbent
- Assumed office January 13, 2020
- Preceded by: Walt Leger III

Personal details
- Born: New Orleans, Louisiana, U.S.
- Party: Democratic
- Education: University of Notre Dame (BA); Georgetown University (JD)

Mandie Landry is an American attorney and progressive politician serving as a member of the Louisiana House of Representatives from the 91st district. Elected in November 2019, she assumed office on January 13, 2020.

== Early life and education ==
Landry was born and raised in New Orleans. She earned a Bachelor of Arts degree in political science from the University of Notre Dame in 2000 and a Juris Doctor from the Georgetown University Law Center in 2005.

== Career ==
As an undergraduate, Landry was a legal assistant for Amnesty International. She also served as a staff assistant for Congressman Dave Obey and as a legislative correspondent for Senator Debbie Stabenow. After graduating from law school, Landry worked briefly as an attorney at Skadden. From 2006 to 2010, she was an associate at Katten Muchin Rosenman, specializing in commercial litigation and internal investigations. She was an associate at Lemle & Kelleher from 2010 to 2013 and Liskow & Lewis from 2013 to 2015. Landry founded her own law firm in 2020. She was elected to the Louisiana House of Representatives in November 2019 and assumed office on January 13, 2020.

On May 6, 2022, Landry, a progressive Democrat, publicly announced her run for the district 5 state senate seat, seeking to replace former Louisiana Senator Karen Carter Peterson. On November 8, 2022, Landry was defeated by Royce Duplessis, a Democrat, in the race for the Senate District 5 seat. That same month, Landry changed her voter registration to No Party Preference. Landry rejoined the Democratic Party before the legislature returned to session.
