= Royce Duplessis =

American attorney and politician

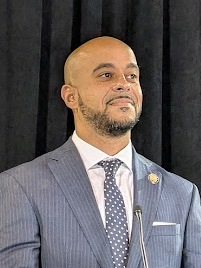

Member of the Louisiana State Senate from the 5th district
- Incumbent
- Assumed office December 6, 2022
- Preceded by: Karen Carter Peterson

Member of the Louisiana House of Representatives from the 93rd district
- In office April 10, 2018 – December 6, 2022
- Preceded by: Helena Moreno
- Succeeded by: Alonzo Knox

Personal details
- Born: September 14, 1982 (age 43) New Orleans, Louisiana, U.S.
- Party: Democratic
- Education: Xavier University of Louisiana (BS); Howard University (JD)

Royce Duplessis (born September 14, 1982) is an American attorney and politician serving as a member of the Louisiana State Senate for the 5th district. He assumed office on December 6, 2022. On November 8, 2022, Duplessis defeated Mandie Landry in a special election to fill the vacant 5th district seat.

== Early life and education ==
Duplessis was born and raised in New Orleans. He earned a Bachelor of Science degree in communications from the Xavier University of Louisiana and a Juris Doctor from the Howard University School of Law.

== Career ==
Prior to his election to the State Senate, Duplessis served in the Louisiana House of Representatives representing the 93rd district. He assumed office in 2018 after winning a special election.

Prior to the 2018 election, Duplessis served as chief of staff to New Orleans City Councilman James Carter and special counsel to the Louisiana Supreme Court. Duplessis is the owner of a private law firm, Duplessis Law Firm, LLC, where he specializes in civil litigation cases. Duplessis announced his candidacy to fill the District 93 seat in a 2018 special election. Duplessis placed first in a field of four candidates.

A champion of criminal justice reform, Duplessis authored House Bill 678 in 2021, creating the Louisiana Work Opportunity Tax credit. The tax credit incentivizes businesses to hire re-entrants participating in work release programs.

Duplessis has also fought for many women's health and rights efforts, including authoring and passing House Bill 784, The Perinatal Mood and Anxiety Disorders Act, to help deal with Louisiana's maternal and infant mortality rates. The bill requires all hospitals and birthing centers to provide women with information about postpartum depression, its symptoms and treatment and other resources before discharge.

On June 9, 2022, Duplessis announced that he was running in the special election to succeed senator Karen Carter Peterson. On November 8, 2022, Duplessis was elected to fill the vacant fifth district seat in the Louisiana State Senate. On December 6, 2022, Duplessis was sworn into the Louisiana State Senate.

In 2023, Royce Duplessis was re-elected to his position as a member of the Louisiana State Senate, representing District 5. He ran unopposed, securing another term in office.

== Personal life ==
Duplessis lives the Central City neighborhood with his wife, Krystle, and their one daughter. He is a practicing Catholic.
