= Diana Bajoie =

American politician (born 1948)

Member of the Louisiana State Senate for the 5th District
- In office 1991–2008
- Succeeded by: Cheryl A. Gray Evans

Member of the Louisiana House of Representatives for the 91st district
- In office 1976–1991
- Succeeded by: Renée Gill Pratt

Member of the New Orleans City Council District B
- In office May 2, 2012 – December 19, 2012
- Preceded by: Stacey Head
- Succeeded by: LaToya Cantrell

Personal details
- Born: Diana E. Bajoie; February 8, 1948 (age 78) New Orleans, Louisiana, US
- Education: Southern University, Southern University Law Center
- Occupation: Politician

Diana E. Bajoie (born February 8, 1948) is an American retired politician from Louisiana. A Democrat, she was the first African American woman to be elected to serve in the Louisiana State Senate (1991) and the first woman to serve as Senate president pro tempore (2004–2008). She served in the Louisiana House of Representatives from 1976 to 1991 and in the Louisiana State Senate from 1991 to 2008.

== Life and career ==
Bajoie received a bachelor's degree in Southern University and A&M College in Baton Rouge. She attended Southern University Law Center and was pursuing a master's degree's in health administration at Southern as of 2012. The only woman serving in the Louisiana House when first elected in 1976, she was a founder and chair of the Louisiana Legislative Black Caucus and the Legislative Women's Caucus. As a legislator, she helped to establish the Louisiana State Museum on Civil Rights and expand and rename the New Orleans Convention Center in honor of the city's first Black mayor, Ernest Morial. Mayor Mitch Landrieu appointed her to fill a temporary vacancy in the New Orleans City Council in June 2012; she did not seek election to a full term. In 2013, she became director of community relations of the LSU Health Sciences Center.

Bajoie was inducted into the Louisiana Political Museum and Hall of Fame in 2007.
