= Karen Carter Peterson =

American politician from Louisiana

Karen Peterson

Chair of the Louisiana Democratic Party
- In office April 28, 2012 – September 12, 2020
- Preceded by: Buddy Leach
- Succeeded by: Katie Bernhardt

Member of the Louisiana Senate from the 5th district
- In office March 9, 2010 – April 9, 2022
- Preceded by: Cheryl Gray Evans
- Succeeded by: Royce Duplessis

Member of the Louisiana House of Representatives from the 93rd district
- In office March 9, 1999 – March 8, 2010
- Preceded by: Avery Alexander
- Succeeded by: Helena Moreno

Personal details
- Born: Karen Ruth Carter; November 1, 1969 (age 57) New Orleans, Louisiana, U.S.
- Party: Democratic
- Spouse: Dana Peterson
- Education: Howard University (BA); Tulane University (JD)

Karen Carter Peterson (born November 1, 1969) is an American lawyer and former politician who served as a member of the Louisiana State House from 1999 to 2010, then as the state senator from the 5th district until her resignation in 2022. She also served as the chair of the Louisiana Democratic Party from 2012 to 2020, becoming the first female chair of the state party. In 2008, Peterson became a Democratic National Committeewoman for Louisiana. In 2017, Peterson was elected vice chair of civic engagement and voter participation for the Democratic National Committee.

In April 2022, Peterson resigned from the Louisiana Senate, citing mental health issues and a gambling addiction. Later in the year, she pled guilty to wire fraud charges and admitted to spending money from the state party and her campaign fund on gambling expenses. She was soon after suspended from the Louisiana Bar and she would be eventually disbarred in October 2022.

In 2023, she was sentenced to 22 months in prison.

== Early life and education ==
Peterson was born and raised in New Orleans, the daughter of Ken and Gwen Carter. Her father was the first African American to become a tax assessor in New Orleans. Peterson graduated from Mercy Academy and in 1991 received a Bachelor of Arts degree in international business and marketing from Howard University in Washington, D.C. Peterson then returned to New Orleans to earn a Juris Doctor from Tulane University Law School in 1995.

== Career ==
=== Louisiana House of Representatives ===
Peterson served as a member of the Louisiana House of Representatives for District 93 from 1999 to 2010. Peterson served as House Speaker Pro Tempore from 2008 to 2010.

During the 2000 presidential election, Carter was a Louisiana state co-chair of GoreNet. GoreNet was a group that supported the Al Gore campaign with a focus on grassroots and online organizing as well as hosting small dollar donor events.

=== Louisiana State Senate ===
In 2010, Peterson won a special election to the Louisiana State Senate from the 5th district after her predecessor, Cheryl Gray Evans, resigned. Peterson served the remainder of Evans' term. In 2011, 2015 and 2010, Peterson was re-elected to full four-year terms.

=== Chair of the Louisiana Democratic Party ===
In the spring of 2012, Senator Peterson was elected Chair of the Louisiana Democratic Party by the Louisiana Democratic State Central Committee, ousting former chair Claude "Buddy" Leach by a vote of 85 to 75. Peterson's tenure as chair was marred by controversy when it emerged that she pressured then state representative John Bel Edwards to drop out of the 2015 Louisiana gubernatorial election so Democrats could rally around a moderate Republican to defeat the perceived frontrunner, U.S. Senator David Vitter. Edwards refused and went on to defeat Vitter by a twelve-point margin.

=== BOLD political organization ===
Peterson is a political protégé of Jim Singleton, a former city councilman and the leader of the powerful Black Organization for Leadership Development (BOLD), which has repeatedly aligned itself in opposition to William J. Jefferson and his Progressive Democrats. With the help of BOLD, Peterson was elected in 1999 to the Louisiana state legislature as a representative for the 93rd district, which encompasses New Orleans, the upper French Quarter, and parts of Central City and Mid-City. In the state legislature, she was one of the most vocal supporters of a plan to reform the New Orleans public school system by putting it under state control. With state senator Walter Boasso, she was also a leader in the protracted but successful consolidation of a multiplicity of levee boards to prevent a repetition of uncoordinated responses that exacerbated the failures of the New Orleans Levee system during Hurricane Katrina. The bill was heavily backed by local business leaders. The bill failed, but a similar version passed in a special session in early 2006. Before Katrina, the governor selected levee board commissioners. After the legislation passed, the selections were made by a local blue-ribbon committee.

=== Wire fraud case and resignations ===
Peterson stepped down as Chair of the Louisiana Democratic Party in 2020; it was later discovered that she had diverted state party funds to various vendors, in order to cover her debts accumulated as a consequence of a gambling addiction. This followed a revelation in May 2019 that she had violated a self-imposed ban on entering casinos.

On April 9, 2022, Peterson resigned from her Senate post, attributing her action to depression, and an addiction to gambling. On April 11, 2022, it was disclosed by a source familiar with the investigation that she was the subject of a probe by the Federal Bureau of Investigation (FBI), for financial crimes that were said to be related to her admitted gambling addiction.

In July 2022, Peterson accepted a plea deal with federal prosecutors in a case involving diversion of state Democratic party funds she used to cover gambling debts. On August 1, 2022, she officially pled guilty to using over $140,000 of the party's money on casino gambling. On August 18, 2026, Peterson, who held the Louisiana Bar Roll number 23446, received an interim suspension from the Louisiana Bar. On October 18, 2022, the Louisiana Supreme Court would officially disbar Peterson. As a result of her disbarment, Peterson's name was effectively stricken from the roll of attorneys of the Louisiana Bar and her license to practice law in the State of Louisiana was officially revoked. On January 11, 2023, Peterson was sentenced to 22 months in prison for wire fraud.

She was released from custody early on May 9, 2024, after spending time at a halfway house. Following her release, she attended the 2024 Democratic National Convention and started working as an advisor at Davillier Law Group.

== Congressional campaigns ==
=== 2006 ===
Peterson was a candidate for U.S. Congress in Louisiana's 2nd congressional district (map) in the mid-term election of November 2006. She, along with several other candidates, challenged incumbent Democrat Bill Jefferson, who was the subject of an FBI investigation. She finished in second place with 19,972 votes (21.6% of the total votes cast), and therefore she and Jefferson entered a runoff round of voting on December 9, 2006. Jefferson prevailed by a 57%-43% margin, the lowest since his original election in 1990.

Peterson received endorsements from prominent Republican businessmen Joe Canizaro and Donald T. "Boysie" Bollinger. She was also endorsed by both the Louisiana State Democratic Party and the Orleans Parish branch of the Democratic Party. She centered her campaign around the argument that Jefferson's corruption scandal left New Orleans with a lack of credible and respected representation in Congress. Jefferson, in turn, accused Peterson of profiting from no-bid "sweetheart" contracts with the New Orleans City Council as their legal advisor for utility regulation. In 2009, Jefferson was convicted of eleven felonies.

=== 2021 ===
In November 2020, Representative Cedric Richmond of the 2nd district announced that he would resign from Congress in January 2021, after being appointed by President-elect Joe Biden to be Senior Advisor to the President and director of the Office of Public Liaison. Shortly thereafter, Peterson launched a campaign website, indicating her intention to run for the seat.

Peterson received endorsements from Stacey Abrams in January, and the Congressional Progressive Caucus in March.

Peterson received 23% of the vote in the first round, and advanced to the second round with Troy Carter. On March 29, 2021, she was endorsed by Gary Chambers, the third-place finisher in the primary,

A Carter campaign ad implied that a 2004 law sponsored by Peterson led to the layoffs of 7,000 teachers and school workers in New Orleans after Hurricane Katrina. That wasn't true, according to several supporters of the 2004 law, which allowed a new state entity, the Recovery School District, to take over failing schools in New Orleans' troubled school system after Katrina. Carter's ad featured former teachers and principals, including Eddy Oliver, who linked 2004 law with the post-Katrina layoffs, a persistent issue among those who lost their jobs in the process and which has become a symbol of the decline afterward of the New Orleans Black middle class. The act allowed the RSD, which the legislature had created the year before, to take over a handful of failing New Orleans schools. It was vigorously supported by Democratic governor Kathleen Blanco and her state Superintendent of Education. Over a year afterward, weeks after Hurricane Katrina inundated New Orleans resulting in the closure of its schools, Blanco pushed Act 35, sponsored by Representative Carl Crane from Baton Rouge, through the legislature. It allowed the RSD to take over all public K-12 schools in New Orleans. Peterson voted against the bill. Carter's campaign ad failed to mention this. Subsequently, the Orleans Parish School Board and the RSD transformed the city's K-12 education into exclusively charter schools.

Peterson received the endorsement of New Orleans mayor LaToya Cantrell on April 7, just three days before the beginning of early voting. Cantrell said, "I'm proud to stand by my friend, to stand by a true partner, a woman who is fearless but who takes the risks that need to be taken," Cantrell said, "It's all about getting things done."

In the April 24th runoff, Carter beat Peterson 48,511 (55.2%) to 39,295 (44.8%), with 87,806 votes reported from 100% of precincts.

== Political positions ==
Karen Peterson is a progressive Democrat, advocating Medicare for All, criminal justice, police reform and legislation to combat climate change. In 2014, Peterson endorsed Senator Mary Landrieu for re-election.

=== Obamacare ===
Peterson is a proponent of Obamacare and Federal Medicaid expansion. In a statement to the state Senate, she argued that critics of Obamacare were motivated by race. The statement drew criticism from Governor Bobby Jindal and the leader of the Louisiana Republican Party, Roger F. Villere, Jr. As a result of the controversy, State Senator Elbert Guillory returned to the Republican Party, the party to which he was once registered but later left to run for elected office.

=== Tobacco taxation ===
Although generally a proponent of restrictions on state government spending instead of tax increases to close budgetary shortfalls, Peterson, an avowed non-smoker, supports higher taxes on tobacco and use of the consequent revenue to fund priorities of the Louisiana Healthier Families Act. Her 2009 House Bill 889 (Louisiana Healthier Families Act), after heavy lobbying by both sides, failed in the Louisiana House of Representatives; she attributed the loss to "the national ambition of our governor", Bobby Jindal, whom she accurately predicted was interested in the presidency and wanted to seek that office without a tax increase on his record.

=== Same-sex marriage ===
In a statement as follows, Peterson endorsed U.S. President Barack Obama's support for same-sex marriage:

President Barack Obama demonstrated the courage and leadership in his statement on marriage equality today that those of us who support him have always admired. It was particularly moving to hear him discuss how his views had evolved on this subject over the years. The change was not the result of some intellectual exercise or political calculation; it was the result of seeing the lives of friends and acquaintances in same-sex relationships that changed his thinking on the issue. We are fortunate to have as our leader a man who is so committed to the principles of fairness and equality ...

Peterson has appointed to her leadership team Stephen Handwerk, the first openly gay man to serve as an officer of the Louisiana Democratic Party. Handwerk writes a weekly column for the Lafayette Daily Advertiser and is the Democratic commentator on FM radio station KPEL in Lafayette.

=== Evolution ===
In 2013, Peterson proposed repeal of the Louisiana Science Education Act, a 2008 law which permits science teachers in public schools to use supplemental classroom materials to question evolution as presented in science textbooks. The Senate Education Committee voted 3–2 on May 1, 2013, against the repeal. Over seventy Nobel Prize-winning scientists supported Peterson's bill and have urged that the state law be removed.

=== COVID-19 pandemic ===
Protesting against the failure of the Senate chamber to follow Centers for Disease Control's recommended COVID-19 pandemic mask-wearing policy, Peterson refused to attend sessions and missed 85% of her votes of the Louisiana State Senate in 2020. She was later criticized in attack ads for accepting her pay during this protest.

== Personal life ==
Peterson lives in New Orleans' Warehouse District. Her husband, Dana Peterson, is a political consultant. Peterson appeared in Spike Lee's documentary about Hurricane Katrina, When the Levees Broke.

Peterson is Catholic.

Party political offices
Preceded by Buddy Leach	Chair of the Louisiana Democratic Party; 2012–2020	Succeeded by Katie Bernhardt
Louisiana State Senate
Preceded by Cheryl Gray Evans	Member of the Louisiana Senate from the 5th district 2010–2022	Succeeded by Royce Duplessis
Louisiana House of Representatives
Preceded by Avery Alexander	Member of the Louisiana House of Representatives from the 93rd district 1999–2010	Succeeded by Helena Moreno
