= Louisiana's 2nd congressional district =

U.S. House district for Louisiana

Coordinates: 30°02′48″N 90°34′07″W

- Interactive map of district boundaries
- Representative: Troy Carter; D–New Orleans
- Distribution: 94.68% urban; 5.42% rural
- Population (2025): 759,289
- Median household income: $63,201
- Ethnicity: 50.4% Black; 33.6% White; 9.6% Hispanic; 3.0% Two or more races; 2.7% Asian; 0.8% other
- Cook PVI: D+17

Louisiana's 2nd congressional district contains nearly all of the city of New Orleans and stretches west and north to Baton Rouge. The district is currently represented by Democrat Troy Carter. With a Cook Partisan Voting Index rating of D+17, it is one of two Democratic districts in Louisiana.

== History ==
Louisiana gained a second district in 1823 as part of the 18th United States Congress. At first it comprised New Orleans and significant populations from surrounding areas. With the growth of population in the urban area, the current district is located mostly within the city of New Orleans.

Since the late 19th century, this has been historically among the most safely Democratic seats in the country, for sharply opposing reasons. During Reconstruction, most African Americans affiliated with the Republican Party and, as a majority, elected Republicans from this district.

White Democrats regained control of the district in 1891, when voter suppression of Republicans was rampant. In 1898 the Democratic-dominated state legislature had disenfranchised most blacks in the state through provisions of a new state constitution that raised barriers to voter registration, such as poll taxes and subjective literacy tests. The Democrats had maintained the political exclusion of blacks for decades. Like most congressional districts in the South, this district consistently voted Democratic from the late 19th century until the late 1960s, because the voters during that time were nearly all white Democrats. Such Democrats created what was known as the Solid South in Congress, exercising power beyond their proportion of the electorate.

From the 1960s onward, however, white conservatives began splitting their tickets and voting Republican, gradually switching outright to the GOP. At the same time, black voters regained the franchise and lent their support to Democrats. Since 1973, the district has been drawn as a black-majority district.

In 2008, after a federal grand jury indicted nine-term incumbent congressman William J. Jefferson on sixteen felony charges related to corruption the year prior, Joseph Cao was elected as the first Republican to represent the 2nd congressional district and most of New Orleans in more than a century. Cao was the first Vietnamese-American U.S. representative elected in the country. He was the only Republican in the 111th Congress to represent a district with a predominantly African-American population. This came even as the district overwhelmingly supported Barack Obama for president; the 2nd was by far the most Democratic district represented by a Republican. The district reverted to its Democratic ways in 2010 when Cao was heavily defeated in 2010 by state representative Cedric Richmond. Richmond defeated nominal Republican challengers in 2012 and 2020, and no Republican even filed from 2014 to 2018.

For most of the period from 1983 to 2013, this district contained nearly all of the city of New Orleans (except for a small portion located in the neighboring 1st congressional district), and some of its suburbs. In 2003, it was pushed into the West Bank portion of Jefferson Parish and South Kenner, which have a higher proportion of white residents. After the 2010 census, the legislature pushed the 2nd slightly to the west, picking up a portion of Baton Rouge–essentially, most of the capital's majority-black precincts.

The 2024 Allen v. Milligan decision dictated a new majority-black precinct, redrawing the 6th district. The 2nd district lost its share of Baton Rouge, as well as northeast Orleans Parish, but now covers all of Iberville and Assumption Parishes, as well as Arabi and Chalmette in St. Bernard Parish.

== Parishes and communities ==
For the 119th and successive Congresses (based on the districts drawn following a 2023 court order), the district contains all or portions of the following parishes and communities.

Ascension Parish (5)

Darrow, Donaldsonville, Gonzales, Lemannville (shared with St. James Parish), Prairieville (part; also 5th)

Assumption Parish (8)

All eight communities

Iberville Parish (9)

All nine communities

Jefferson Parish (14)

Avondale, Bridge City, Estelle (part; also 1st), Gretna, Harvey, Kenner (part; also 1st), Marrero, Metairie (part; also 1st), River Ridge (part; also 1st), Terrytown, Timberlane, Waggaman, Westwego, Woodmere

Lafourche Parish (1)

Thibodaux (part; also 3rd)

Orleans Parish (1)

New Orleans (part; also 1st)

St. Bernard Parish (3)

Arabi, Chalmette (part; also 1st), Meraux (part; also 1st)

St. Charles Parish (10)

Ama, Boutte, Bayou Gauche, Des Allemands (part; also 3rd; shared with Lafourche Parish), Hahnville, Killona, Luling, Paradis, St. Rose (part; also 1st), Taft

St. James Parish (14)

All 14 communities

St. John the Baptist Parish (6)

All six communities

== Recent election results from statewide races ==
Year	Office	Results
2008	President	Obama 64% - 34%
2012	President	Obama 69% - 31%
2014	Senate	Landrieu 73% - 27%
2015	Governor	Bel Edwards 76% - 24%
2015	Lt. Governor	Holden 64% - 36%
2016	President	Clinton 66% - 31%
2016	Senate	Campbell 67% - 33%
2019	Governor	Bel Edwards 77% - 23%
2019	Lt. Governor	Jones 56% - 44%
2019	Attorney General	Jackson 61% - 39%
2020	President	Biden 67% - 31%
2023	Attorney General	Cheek 60% - 40%
2024	President	Harris 65% - 33%

== List of members representing the district ==
Member	Party	Term	Cong ress	Electoral history	Location
District created March 4, 1823
Henry Hosford Gurley (Baton Rouge)	Democratic-Republican	March 4, 1823 – March 3, 1825	18th 19th 20th 21st	Elected in 1822. Re-elected in 1824. Re-elected in 1826. Re-elected in 1828. Retired.	1823–1833; East Baton Rouge, Feliciana, Iberville, West Baton Rouge, Pointe Coupee, Saint Helena, Saint Tammany, and Washington parishes
Henry Hosford Gurley (Baton Rouge)	Anti-Jacksonian	March 4, 1825 – March 3, 1831	18th 19th 20th 21st	Elected in 1822. Re-elected in 1824. Re-elected in 1826. Re-elected in 1828. Retired.	1823–1833; East Baton Rouge, Feliciana, Iberville, West Baton Rouge, Pointe Coupee, Saint Helena, Saint Tammany, and Washington parishes
Philemon Thomas (Baton Rouge)	Jacksonian	March 4, 1831 – March 3, 1835	22nd 23rd	Elected in 1830. Re-elected in 1832. Retired.	1823–1833; East Baton Rouge, Feliciana, Iberville, West Baton Rouge, Pointe Coupee, Saint Helena, Saint Tammany, and Washington parishes
Philemon Thomas (Baton Rouge)	Jacksonian	March 4, 1831 – March 3, 1835	22nd 23rd	Elected in 1830. Re-elected in 1832. Retired.	1833–1843 [data missing]
Eleazer Wheelock Ripley (Jackson)	Jacksonian	March 4, 1835 – March 3, 1837	24th 25th	Elected in 1834. Re-elected in 1836. Retired but died before next term began.	1833–1843 [data missing]
Eleazer Wheelock Ripley (Jackson)	Democratic	March 4, 1837 – March 2, 1839	24th 25th	Elected in 1834. Re-elected in 1836. Retired but died before next term began.	1833–1843 [data missing]
Vacant		March 2, 1839 – March 4, 1839	25th		1833–1843 [data missing]
Thomas Withers Chinn (Baton Rouge)	Whig	March 4, 1839 – March 3, 1841	26th	Elected in 1838. Retired.	1833–1843 [data missing]
John Bennett Dawson (St. Francisville)	Democratic	March 4, 1841 – March 3, 1843	27th	Elected in 1840. Redistricted to the 3rd district.	1833–1843 [data missing]
Alcée Louis la Branche (New Orleans)	Democratic	March 4, 1843 – March 3, 1845	28th	Elected in 1842. Retired.	1843–1853 [data missing]
Bannon Goforth Thibodeaux (Thibodaux)	Democratic	March 4, 1845 – March 3, 1849	29th 30th	Elected in 1844. Re-elected in 1846. Retired.	1843–1853 [data missing]
Charles Magill Conrad (New Orleans)	Whig	March 4, 1849 – August 17, 1850	31st	Elected in 1848. Resigned to become United States Secretary of War.	1843–1853 [data missing]
Vacant		August 17, 1850 – December 5, 1850	31st		1843–1853 [data missing]
Henry Adams Bullard (New Orleans)	Whig	December 5, 1850 – March 3, 1851	31st	Elected to finish Conrad's term. Retired.	1843–1853 [data missing]
Joseph Aristide Landry (Donaldsonville)	Whig	March 4, 1851 – March 3, 1853	32nd	Elected in 1850. Retired.	1843–1853 [data missing]
Theodore Gaillard Hunt (New Orleans)	Whig	March 4, 1853 – March 3, 1855	33rd	Elected in 1852. Lost re-election as a Know Nothing candidate.	1853–1863 [data missing]
Miles Taylor (Donaldsonville)	Democratic	March 4, 1855 – February 5, 1861	34th 35th 36th	Elected in 1854. Re-elected in 1856. Re-elected in 1858. Withdrew due to onset of Civil War.	1853–1863 [data missing]
Vacant		February 5, 1861 – February 17, 1863	36th 37th	Civil War	1853–1863 [data missing]
Michael Hahn (New Orleans)	Union	February 17, 1863 – March 3, 1863	37th	Elected in 1862. (Note: He was elected along with Benjamin Franklin Flanders, assuming the seat left vacant after Miles Taylor's resigned his seat in February 1861. Flanders and Hahn were not seated in Congress until the last fifteen days of their terms on February 17, 1863.); Retired.	1853–1863 [data missing]
Vacant		March 4, 1863– July 18, 1868	38th 39th 40th	Civil War and Reconstruction	
James Mann (New Orleans)	Democratic	July 18, 1868 – August 26, 1868	40th	Elected to finish the vacant term. Died.	1868–1873 [data missing]
Vacant		August 26, 1868 – March 3, 1869	40th	On November 3, 1868, John Willis Menard won a special election for the remainder of Mann's term in the 40th Congress, running alongside Lionel Allen Sheldon, who was running to represent the district for a full term in the 41st. Menard and Sheldon received the same number of votes and were both declared winners. But the losing candidate, Caleb S. Hunt, appealed to the U.S. House of Representatives to deny Menard the seat. The House could not reach a consensus on seating either man, so the seat was kept vacant until the 41st Congress. Menard was the first black person elected to Congress, as well as the first black person to address Congress.	1868–1873 [data missing]
Lionel Allen Sheldon (New Orleans)	Republican	March 4, 1869 – March 3, 1875	41st 42nd 43rd	Elected in 1868. Re-elected in 1870. Re-elected in 1872. Lost re-election.	1868–1873 [data missing]
Lionel Allen Sheldon (New Orleans)	Republican	March 4, 1869 – March 3, 1875	41st 42nd 43rd	Elected in 1868. Re-elected in 1870. Re-elected in 1872. Lost re-election.	1873–1883 [data missing]
Ezekiel John Ellis (New Orleans)	Democratic	March 4, 1875 – March 3, 1885	44th 45th 46th 47th 48th	Elected in 1874. Re-elected in 1876. Re-elected in 1878. Re-elected in 1880. Re-elected in 1882. Retired.	1873–1883 [data missing]
Ezekiel John Ellis (New Orleans)	Democratic	March 4, 1875 – March 3, 1885	44th 45th 46th 47th 48th	Elected in 1874. Re-elected in 1876. Re-elected in 1878. Re-elected in 1880. Re-elected in 1882. Retired.	1883–1893 [data missing]
Michael Hahn (New Orleans)	Republican	March 3, 1885 – March 15, 1886	49th	Elected in 1884. Died.	1883–1893 [data missing]
Vacant		March 15, 1886 – December 9, 1886	49th		1883–1893 [data missing]
Nathaniel Dick Wallace (New Orleans)	Democratic	December 9, 1886 – March 3, 1887	49th	Elected to finish Hahn's term. Retired.	1883–1893 [data missing]
Matthew Diamond Lagan (New Orleans)	Democratic	March 4, 1887 – March 3, 1889	50th	Elected in 1886. Retired.	1883–1893 [data missing]
Hamilton D. Coleman (New Orleans)	Republican	March 4, 1889 – March 3, 1891	51st	Elected in 1888. Lost re-election.	1883–1893 [data missing]
Matthew Diamond Lagan (New Orleans)	Democratic	March 4, 1891 – March 3, 1893	52nd	Elected in 1890. Retired.	1883–1893 [data missing]
Robert Charles Davey (New Orleans)	Democratic	March 4, 1893 – March 3, 1895	53rd	Elected in 1892. Retired.	1893–1903 [data missing]
Charles Francis Buck (New Orleans)	Democratic	March 4, 1895 – March 3, 1897	54th	Elected in 1894. Retired to run for Mayor of New Orleans.	1893–1903 [data missing]
Robert Charles Davey (New Orleans)	Democratic	March 4, 1897 – December 26, 1908	55th 56th 57th 58th 59th 60th	Elected in 1896. Re-elected in 1898. Re-elected in 1900. Re-elected in 1902. Re-elected in 1904. Re-elected in 1906. Re-elected in 1908 but died before next term began.	1893–1903 [data missing]
Robert Charles Davey (New Orleans)	Democratic	March 4, 1897 – December 26, 1908	55th 56th 57th 58th 59th 60th	Elected in 1896. Re-elected in 1898. Re-elected in 1900. Re-elected in 1902. Re-elected in 1904. Re-elected in 1906. Re-elected in 1908 but died before next term began.	1903–1913 [data missing]
Vacant		December 26, 1908 – March 30, 1909	60th 61st		1903–1913 [data missing]
Samuel Louis Gilmore (New Orleans)	Democratic	March 30, 1909 – July 18, 1910	61st	Elected to finish Davey's term. Died.	1903–1913 [data missing]
Vacant		July 18, 1910 – November 8, 1910	61st		1903–1913 [data missing]
H. Garland Dupré (New Orleans)	Democratic	November 8, 1910 – February 21, 1924	61st 62nd 63rd 64th 65th 66th 67th 68th	Elected to finish Gilmore's term. Also elected to the next full term. Re-elected in 1912. Re-elected in 1914. Re-elected in 1916. Re-elected in 1918. Re-elected in 1920. Re-elected in 1922. Died.	1903–1913 [data missing]
H. Garland Dupré (New Orleans)	Democratic	November 8, 1910 – February 21, 1924	61st 62nd 63rd 64th 65th 66th 67th 68th	Elected to finish Gilmore's term. Also elected to the next full term. Re-elected in 1912. Re-elected in 1914. Re-elected in 1916. Re-elected in 1918. Re-elected in 1920. Re-elected in 1922. Died.	1913–1923 [data missing]
H. Garland Dupré (New Orleans)	Democratic	November 8, 1910 – February 21, 1924	61st 62nd 63rd 64th 65th 66th 67th 68th	Elected to finish Gilmore's term. Also elected to the next full term. Re-elected in 1912. Re-elected in 1914. Re-elected in 1916. Re-elected in 1918. Re-elected in 1920. Re-elected in 1922. Died.	1923–1933 [data missing]
Vacant		February 21, 1924 – April 22, 1924	68th		1923–1933 [data missing]
James Z. Spearing (New Orleans)	Democratic	April 22, 1924 – March 3, 1931	68th 69th 70th 71st	Elected to finish Dupré's term. Re-elected later in 1924. Re-elected in 1926. Re-elected in 1928. Lost renomination.	1923–1933 [data missing]
Paul H. Maloney (New Orleans)	Democratic	March 4, 1931 – December 15, 1940	72nd 73rd 74th 75th 76th	Elected in 1930. Re-elected in 1932. Re-elected in 1934. Re-elected in 1936. Re-elected in 1938. Lost renomination and resigned to become collector of internal revenue for the New Orleans district.	1923–1933 [data missing]
Paul H. Maloney (New Orleans)	Democratic	March 4, 1931 – December 15, 1940	72nd 73rd 74th 75th 76th	Elected in 1930. Re-elected in 1932. Re-elected in 1934. Re-elected in 1936. Re-elected in 1938. Lost renomination and resigned to become collector of internal revenue for the New Orleans district.	1933–1943 [data missing]
Vacant		December 15, 1940 – January 3, 1941	76th		1933–1943 [data missing]
Hale Boggs (New Orleans)	Democratic	January 3, 1941 – January 3, 1943	77th	Elected in 1940. Lost renomination.	1933–1943 [data missing]
Paul H. Maloney (New Orleans)	Democratic	January 3, 1943 – January 3, 1947	78th 79th	Elected in 1942. Re-elected in 1944. Retired.	1943–1953 [data missing]
Hale Boggs (New Orleans)	Democratic	January 3, 1947 – January 3, 1973	80th 81st 82nd 83rd 84th 85th 86th 87th 88th 89th 90th 91st 92nd	Elected in 1946. Re-elected in 1948. Re-elected in 1950. Re-elected in 1952. Re-elected in 1954. Re-elected in 1956. Re-elected in 1958. Re-elected in 1960. Re-elected in 1962. Re-elected in 1964. Re-elected in 1966. Re-elected in 1968. Re-elected in 1970. Re-elected posthumously in 1972. Presumed dead after private plane went missing over Alaska October 16, 1972. Seat declared vacant at beginning of the 93rd Congress.	1943–1953 [data missing]
Hale Boggs (New Orleans)	Democratic	January 3, 1947 – January 3, 1973	80th 81st 82nd 83rd 84th 85th 86th 87th 88th 89th 90th 91st 92nd	Elected in 1946. Re-elected in 1948. Re-elected in 1950. Re-elected in 1952. Re-elected in 1954. Re-elected in 1956. Re-elected in 1958. Re-elected in 1960. Re-elected in 1962. Re-elected in 1964. Re-elected in 1966. Re-elected in 1968. Re-elected in 1970. Re-elected posthumously in 1972. Presumed dead after private plane went missing over Alaska October 16, 1972. Seat declared vacant at beginning of the 93rd Congress.	1953–1963 [data missing]
Hale Boggs (New Orleans)	Democratic	January 3, 1947 – January 3, 1973	80th 81st 82nd 83rd 84th 85th 86th 87th 88th 89th 90th 91st 92nd	Elected in 1946. Re-elected in 1948. Re-elected in 1950. Re-elected in 1952. Re-elected in 1954. Re-elected in 1956. Re-elected in 1958. Re-elected in 1960. Re-elected in 1962. Re-elected in 1964. Re-elected in 1966. Re-elected in 1968. Re-elected in 1970. Re-elected posthumously in 1972. Presumed dead after private plane went missing over Alaska October 16, 1972. Seat declared vacant at beginning of the 93rd Congress.	1963–1973 [data missing]
Vacant		January 3, 1973 – March 20, 1973	93rd		1973–1983 [data missing]
Lindy Boggs (New Orleans)	Democratic	March 20, 1973 – January 3, 1991	93rd 94th 95th 96th 97th 98th 99th 100th 101st	Elected to finish her husband's term. Re-elected in 1974. Re-elected in 1976. Re-elected in 1978. Re-elected in 1980. Re-elected in 1982. Re-elected in 1984. Re-elected in 1986. Re-elected in 1988. Retired.	1973–1983 [data missing]
Lindy Boggs (New Orleans)	Democratic	March 20, 1973 – January 3, 1991	93rd 94th 95th 96th 97th 98th 99th 100th 101st	Elected to finish her husband's term. Re-elected in 1974. Re-elected in 1976. Re-elected in 1978. Re-elected in 1980. Re-elected in 1982. Re-elected in 1984. Re-elected in 1986. Re-elected in 1988. Retired.	1983–1993 [data missing]
William J. Jefferson (New Orleans)	Democratic	January 3, 1991 – January 3, 2009	102nd 103rd 104th 105th 106th 107th 108th 109th 110th	Elected in 1990. Re-elected in 1992. Re-elected in 1994. Re-elected in 1996. Re-elected in 1998. Re-elected in 2000. Re-elected in 2002. Re-elected in 2004. Re-elected in 2006. Lost re-election.	1983–1993 [data missing]
William J. Jefferson (New Orleans)	Democratic	January 3, 1991 – January 3, 2009	102nd 103rd 104th 105th 106th 107th 108th 109th 110th	Elected in 1990. Re-elected in 1992. Re-elected in 1994. Re-elected in 1996. Re-elected in 1998. Re-elected in 2000. Re-elected in 2002. Re-elected in 2004. Re-elected in 2006. Lost re-election.	1993–2003 [data missing]
William J. Jefferson (New Orleans)	Democratic	January 3, 1991 – January 3, 2009	102nd 103rd 104th 105th 106th 107th 108th 109th 110th	Elected in 1990. Re-elected in 1992. Re-elected in 1994. Re-elected in 1996. Re-elected in 1998. Re-elected in 2000. Re-elected in 2002. Re-elected in 2004. Re-elected in 2006. Lost re-election.	2003–2013
Joseph Cao (New Orleans)	Republican	January 3, 2009 – January 3, 2011	111th	Elected in 2008. Lost re-election.	2003–2013
Cedric Richmond (New Orleans)	Democratic	January 3, 2011 – January 15, 2021	112th 113th 114th 115th 116th 117th	Elected in 2010. Re-elected in 2012. Re-elected in 2014. Re-elected in 2016. Re-elected in 2018. Re-elected in 2020. Resigned to become Senior Advisor to the President.	2003–2013
Cedric Richmond (New Orleans)	Democratic	January 3, 2011 – January 15, 2021	112th 113th 114th 115th 116th 117th	Elected in 2010. Re-elected in 2012. Re-elected in 2014. Re-elected in 2016. Re-elected in 2018. Re-elected in 2020. Resigned to become Senior Advisor to the President.	2013–2023
Vacant		January 15, 2021 – May 11, 2021	117th		2013–2023
Troy Carter (New Orleans)	Democratic	May 11, 2021 – present	117th 118th 119th	Elected to finish Richmond's term. Re-elected in 2022. Re-elected in 2024. Re-elected in 2026.	2013–2023
Troy Carter (New Orleans)	Democratic	May 11, 2021 – present	117th 118th 119th	Elected to finish Richmond's term. Re-elected in 2022. Re-elected in 2024. Re-elected in 2026.	2023–2025
Troy Carter (New Orleans)	Democratic	May 11, 2021 – present	117th 118th 119th	Elected to finish Richmond's term. Re-elected in 2022. Re-elected in 2024. Re-elected in 2026.	2025–present

== Recent election results ==
=== 2002 ===
Louisiana's 2nd Congressional District Election (2002)
Party	Candidate	Votes	%
Democratic	William J. Jefferson (Incumbent)	90,310	63.53
Democratic	Irma Muse Dixon	28,480	20.03
Republican	Silky Sullivan	15,440	10.86
Democratic	Clarence "Buddy" Hunt	4,137	2.91
Libertarian	Wayne Clement	3,789	2.67
Total votes		142,156	100.00
Turnout			
Democratic hold			

=== 2004 ===
Louisiana's 2nd Congressional District Election (2004)
Party	Candidate	Votes	%
Democratic	William J. Jefferson (Incumbent)	173,510	79.01
Republican	Art Schwertz	46,097	20.99
Total votes		219,607	100.00
Turnout			
Democratic hold			

=== 2006 ===
Louisiana's 2nd Congressional District General Election (2006)
Party	Candidate	Votes	%
Democratic	William J. Jefferson (Incumbent)	28,283	30.08
Democratic	Karen Carter Peterson	20,364	21.66
Democratic	Derrick D.T. Shepherd	16,799	17.87
Republican	Joe Lavigne	12,511	13.31
Democratic	Troy A. Carter	11,304	12.02
Republican	Eric T. Bradley	1,159	1.23
Democratic	Regina H Bartholomew	1,125	1.20
Total votes		91,545	100.00
Turnout			

Louisiana's 2nd Congressional District General Election RUNOFF (December 9, 2006)
Party	Candidate	Votes	%
Democratic	William J. Jefferson (Incumbent)	35,153	56.55
Democratic	Karen Carter Peterson	27,011	43.45
Total votes		62,164	100.00
Turnout			
Democratic hold			

=== 2008 ===
Louisiana's 2nd Congressional District Election (December 6, 2008)
Party	Candidate	Votes	%
Republican	Joseph Cao	33,132	49.54
Democratic	William J. Jefferson (Incumbent)	31,318	46.83
Green	Malik Rahim	1,883	2.82
Libertarian	Gregory W. Kahn	549	0.82
Total votes		66,882	100.00
Turnout			
Republican gain from Democratic			

=== 2010 ===
Louisiana's 2nd Congressional District Election (2010)
Party	Candidate	Votes	%
Democratic	Cedric Richmond	83,705	64.59
Republican	Joseph Cao (Incumbent)	43,378	33.47
Independent	Anthony Marquize	1,876	1.45
Independent	Jack Radosta	645	0.50
Total votes		129,604	100.00
Turnout			
Democratic gain from Republican			

=== 2012 ===
Louisiana's 2nd Congressional District Election (2012)
Party	Candidate	Votes	%
Democratic	Cedric Richmond (Incumbent)	158,501	55.20
Democratic	Gary Landrieu	71,916	25.00
Republican	Dwayne Bailey	38,801	13.50
Republican	Josue Larose	11,345	3.90
Libertarian	Caleb Trotter	6,791	2.40
Total votes		287,354	100.00
Turnout			
Democratic hold			

=== 2014 ===
Louisiana's 2nd Congressional District Election (2014)
Party	Candidate	Votes	%
Democratic	Cedric Richmond (Incumbent)	152,201	68.69
Democratic	Gary Landrieu	37,805	17.06
No Party	David Brooks	16,327	7.37
Libertarian	Samuel Davenport	15,237	6.88
Total votes		221,570	100.00
Turnout			47.6
Democratic hold			

=== 2016 ===
Louisiana's 2nd Congressional District Election (2016)
Party	Candidate	Votes	%
Democratic	Cedric Richmond (Incumbent)	198,289	69.75
Democratic	Kip Holden	57,125	20.10
Democratic	Kenneth Cutno	28,855	10.15
Total votes		284,269	100.00
Turnout			67.7
Democratic hold			

=== 2018 ===
Louisiana's 2nd Congressional District Election (2018)
Party	Candidate	Votes	%
Democratic	Cedric Richmond (Incumbent)	190,182	80.6
Independent	Jesse Schmidt	20,465	8.7
Independent	Belden "Noonie Man" Batiste	17,260	7.3
Independent	Shawndra Rodriguez	8,075	3.4
Total votes		235,982	100.0
Democratic hold			

=== 2020 ===
Louisiana's 2nd Congressional District Election (2020)
Party	Candidate	Votes	%
Democratic	Cedric Richmond (Incumbent)	201,636	63.61
Republican	David Schilling	47,575	15.01
Democratic	Glenn Adrain Harris	33,684	10.63
Republican	Sheldon Vincent, Sr.	15,565	4.91
Independent	Belden "Noonie Man" Batiste	12,268	3.87
Independent	Colby James	6,254	1.97
Total votes		316,982	100.0
Democratic hold			

=== 2021 (special) ===
Louisiana's 2nd Congressional District Special Election (March 20, 2021)
Party	Candidate	Votes	%
Democratic	Troy Carter	34,402	36.38
Democratic	Karen Carter Peterson	21,673	22.92
Democratic	Gary Chambers Jr.	20,163	21.31
Republican	Claston Bernard	9,237	9.77
Republican	Chelsea Ardoin	3,218	3.40
Republican	Greg Lirette	2,349	2.48
Republican	Sheldon C. Vincent Sr.	754	0.80
Democratic	Desiree Ontiveros	699	0.74
Independent	Belden "Noonie Man" Batiste	598	0.63
Democratic	Harold John	403	0.43
Libertarian	Mindy McConnell	323	0.34
Democratic	J. Christopher Johnson	288	0.30
Democratic	Jenette M. Porter	244	0.26
Democratic	Lloyd M. Kelly	122	0.13
No party preference	Brandon Jolicoeur	94	0.10
Total votes		94,567	100.00

Louisiana's 2nd Congressional District Special Election RUNOFF (April 24, 2021)
Party	Candidate	Votes	%
Democratic	Troy Carter	48,513	55.25
Democratic	Karen Carter Peterson	39,297	44.75
Total votes		87,810	100.00
Democratic hold			

=== 2022 ===
Louisiana's 2nd Congressional District Election (2022)
Party	Candidate	Votes	%
Democratic	Troy Carter (incumbent)	158,120	77.1
Republican	Dan Lux	46,927	22.9
Total votes		205,047	100.00
Democratic hold			

=== 2024 ===
2024 Louisiana's 2nd congressional district election
Party	Candidate	Votes	%
Democratic	Troy Carter (incumbent)	184,009	60.3
Republican	Christy Lynch	41,641	13.6
Republican	Devin Graham	39,174	12.8
Democratic	Devin Davis	32,482	10.6
Republican	Shorell Perrilloux	7,878	2.6
Total votes		305,184	100.0
Democratic hold			

== See also ==
- Louisiana's congressional districts
- List of United States congressional districts
