= 2025 New Orleans mayoral election =

Local election in Louisiana, US

- October 11, 2025
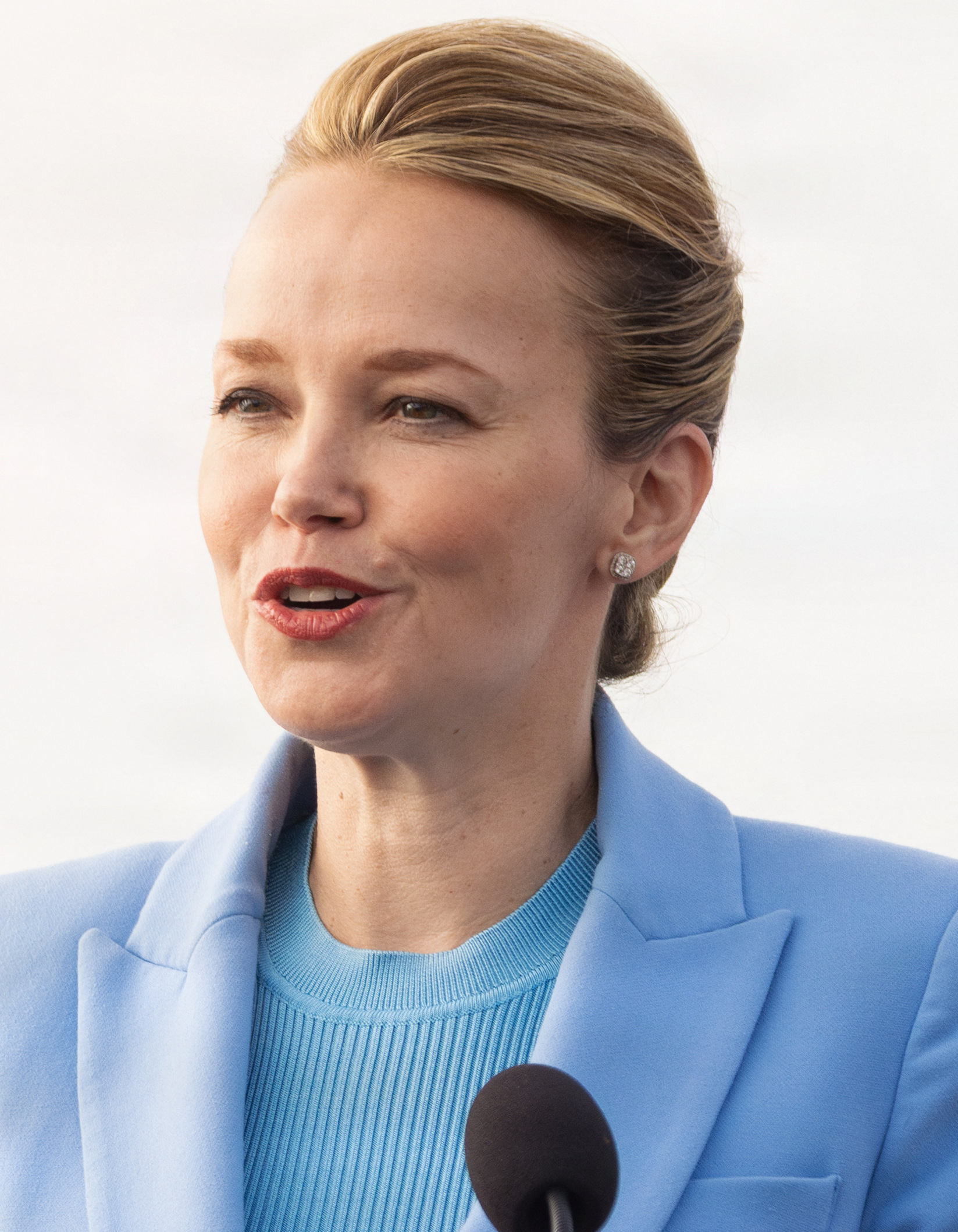

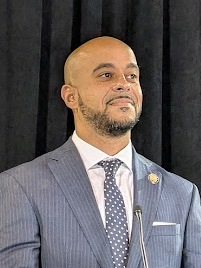

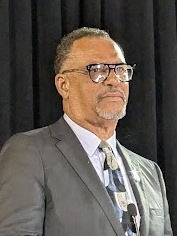
Candidate	Helena Moreno	Royce Duplessis	Oliver Thomas
Party	Democratic	Democratic	Democratic
Popular vote	57,797	23,474	19,619
Percentage	54.87%	22.29%	18.63%
Precinct results
Moreno:
30–40%
40–50%
50–60%
60–70%
70–80%
80–90%
>90%
Duplessis:
30–40%
40–50%
50–60%
Thomas:
30–40%
40–50%
50–60%
Mayor before election
LaToya Cantrell
Democratic
Elected Mayor
Helena Moreno
Democratic

The 2025 New Orleans mayoral election was held on October 11, 2025, to elect the mayor of New Orleans, Louisiana. Under the Louisiana primary system, all candidates appeared on the same ballot regardless of party. A runoff was scheduled to be held on November 15 between the top two candidates, if none managed to achieve a majority of the vote.

Incumbent mayor LaToya Cantrell was term-limited and thus ineligible to run for re-election in 2025.

The election was won by president of the New Orleans City Council Helena Moreno. She was elected with 54.9% of the vote, avoiding a runoff.

== Candidates ==
=== Declared ===
- Joe Bikulege (Independent)
- Russell Butler (Independent)
- Eileen Carter (Independent), former social media manager for mayor LaToya Cantrell
- Manny Chevrolet (Independent)
- Renada Collins (Independent), business coach
- Royce Duplessis (Democratic), state senator from the 5th district
- Frank Janusa (Republican), certified public accountant
- Helena Moreno (Democratic), president of the New Orleans City Council
- Frank Scurlock (Independent), air cushion manufacturer
- Oliver Thomas (Democratic), city councilor from district E
- Ricky Twiggs (Independent), counselor

=== Disqualified ===
- Gabrielle Thomas (Republican)
- Tyrell Morris (Democratic), former Orleans Parish 911 communications director

=== Withdrawn ===
- Belden "Noonie Man" Batiste (Democratic), perennial candidate (running for city council)
- Arthur Hunter (Democratic), former Orleans Parish Criminal Court judge (remained on ballot, endorsed Duplessis)

=== Declined ===
- Michael Bagneris (Democratic), former state court judge and candidate for mayor in 2014 and 2017
- Troy Henry (Democratic), businessman and candidate for mayor in 2010 and 2017

== General election ==
=== Endorsements ===
Royce Duplessis (D)

U.S. representatives

- Cleo Fields, LA-06 (1993–1997, 2025–present)

Statewide officials

- Lambert Boissiere III, former Louisiana public service commissioner from the 3rd district (2005–2022)
- Irma Muse Dixon, former Louisiana public service commissioner from the 3rd district (1992–2004) and state representative from the 95th district (1988–1992)
- Bernette Joshua Johnson, former chief justice of the Louisiana Supreme Court (2013–2020) from the 7th district (1994–2020)

State legislators

- Louis Charbonnet, former state representative from the 96th district (1970–1984)

Municipal officials

- Sidney Barthelemy, former mayor of New Orleans (1986–1994)
- Lambert Boissiere Jr., Orleans Parish 1st City Court constable (2014–present) and former New Orleans city councilor from district D (1982–1994)
- Arthur Hunter, former Orleans Parish District Court judge from Section K (1997–2020) and 2025 mayoral candidate

Labor unions

- Greater New Orleans AFL-CIO (co-endorsement with Moreno and Thomas)
- United Teachers of New Orleans (co-endorsement with Moreno and Thomas)

Newspapers and other media

- The Louisiana Weekly

Party chapters

- Orleans Parish Democratic Executive Committee
Helena Moreno (D)

Federal executive branch officials

- Kamala Harris, former vice president of the United States (2021–2025)
- Mitch Landrieu, former senior advisor to the president of the United States (2021–2024), lieutenant governor of Louisiana (2004–2010), and former mayor of New Orleans (2010–2018)
- Cedric Richmond, former Office of Public Engagement director (2021–2022) and former U.S. representative from LA-02 (2011–2021)

U.S. representatives

- Troy Carter, U.S. representative from LA-02 (2021–present)

Statewide officials

- Davante Lewis, Louisiana public service commissioner from the 3rd district (2022–present)

State legislators

- Aimee Adatto Freeman, state representative from the 98th district (2020–present)
- Jimmy Harris, state senator from the 4th district (2020–present)
- Juan LaFonta, former state representative from the 96th district (2005–2012)
- Mandie Landry, state representative from the 91st district (2020–present)

Municipal officials

- Desiree Charbonnet, former chief judge (2012–2016) of the Orleans Parish District Court from Section B (2007–2017) and runner-up for mayor in 2017
- Donna Glapion, Orleans Parish 1st City Court clerk (2023–present) (campaign co-chair)
- Lisa Ray-Diggs, Orleans Parish 2nd City Court clerk (2022–present)
- Jason Williams, Orleans Parish district attorney (2021–present)
- Carlos Zervigon, Orleans Parish School Board member from the 6th district (2021–present)

Individuals

- Robin Barnes, jazz singer and fitness leader
- Members of the band Cha Wa
- Kristin Diable, singer-songwriter
- Lenny Kravitz, singer-songwriter
- Stanton Moore, drummer for the band Galactic
- Members of the band Partners-N-Crime
- Dawn Richard, singer

Labor unions

- Greater New Orleans AFL-CIO (co-endorsement with Duplessis and Thomas)
- UNITE HERE Local 23
- United Teachers of New Orleans (co-endorsement with Duplessis and Thomas)

Organizations

- EMILY's List
- Forum for Equality PAC
- Latino Victory Fund

Newspapers and other media

- Gambit
- New Orleans Data News Weekly
- The Times-Picayune/The New Orleans Advocate
Oliver Thomas (D)

Labor unions

- Greater New Orleans AFL-CIO (co-endorsement with Duplessis and Moreno)
- United Teachers of New Orleans (co-endorsement with Duplessis and Moreno)

Newspapers and other media

- The New Orleans Tribune

=== Polling ===
Poll source	Date(s) administered	Sample size (Note: Key: A – all adults RV – registered voters LV – likely voters V – unclear)	Margin of error	Royce Duplessis	Arthur Hunter	Helena Moreno	Oliver Thomas	Other	Undecided
University of New Orleans	September 20–24, 2025	409 (LV)	± 4.8%	15%	–	49%	13%	3% (Note: "Someone else" with 3%)	20%
Mason Dixon (Note: Poll commissioned by WVUE-TV)	September 8–10, 2025	625 (RV)	± 4.0%	11%	–	51%	16%	7% (Note: Frank Janusa with 7%)	15%
Faucheux Strategies (Note: Poll commissioned by WWL-TV)	August 8–14, 2025	600 (V)	± 4.0%	18%	5%	47%	16%	2% (Note: Eileen Carter with 2%; all other candidates with ≤1%)	12%
Faucheux Strategies (Note: Poll commissioned by the Voice of the People PAC, which is led by a man described by The Times-Picayune as "... allied with [Helena] Moreno".)	July 14–19, 2025	600 (V)	± 4.0%	14%	5%	47%	16%	–	18%
Faucheux Strategies (Note: Poll commissioned by the New Orleans Crime Coalition)	May 27 – June 4, 2025	638 (RV)	± 3.78%	–	9%	47%	22%	–	22%
JMC Analytics (R) (Note: Poll commissioned by a PAC not affiliated with any candidate)	May 27–28, 2025	500 (LV)	± 4.4%	–	11%	52%	23%	–	15%

Hypothetical runoff polling

Helena Moreno vs. Royce Duplessis

Poll source	Date(s) administered	Sample size	Margin of error	Helena Moreno	Royce Duplessis	Undecided
Mason Dixon	September 8–10, 2025	625 (RV)	± 4.0%	59%	28%	13%
Faucheux Strategies	August 8–14, 2025	600 (V)	± 4.0%	58%	27%	15%

Helena Moreno vs. Oliver Thomas

Poll source	Date(s) administered	Sample size	Margin of error	Helena Moreno	Oliver Thomas	Undecided
Mason Dixon	September 8–10, 2025	625 (RV)	± 4.0%	60%	29%	11%
Faucheux Strategies	August 8–14, 2025	600 (V)	± 4.0%	59%	26%	15%

=== Results ===
2025 New Orleans mayoral election
Party	Candidate	Votes	%
Democratic	Helena Moreno	57,797	54.87
Democratic	Royce Duplessis	23,474	22.29
Democratic	Oliver Thomas	19,619	18.63
Republican	Frank Janusa	2,315	2.20
Independent	Ricky Twiggs	806	0.77
Democratic	Arthur Hunter (withdrawn)	357	0.34
Independent	Eileen Carter	247	0.23
Independent	Manny Chevrolet	206	0.20
Independent	Renada Collins	190	0.18
Independent	Joe Bikulege	135	0.13
Independent	Frank Scurlock	99	0.09
Independent	Russell Butler	81	0.08
Total votes		105,326	100%

== Notes ==
Partisan clients
