= 2021 New Orleans mayoral election =

- November 13, 2021
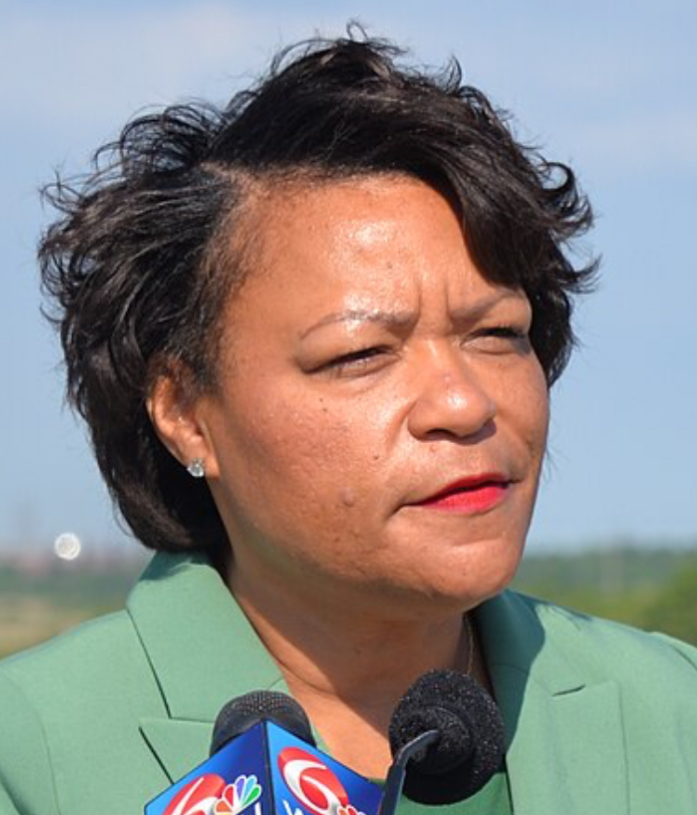

Candidate	LaToya Cantrell	Vina Nguyen
Party	Democratic	Republican
Popular vote	48,750	10,133
Percentage	64.72%	13.45%
Candidate	Leilani Heno	Belden Batiste
Party	No party preference	Democratic
Popular vote	6,605	3,863
Percentage	8.77%	5.13%
Interactive map version
Results by precinct:
Cantrell:
20–30%
30–40%
40–50%
50–60%
60–70%
70–80%
80–90%
>90%
Nguyen:
30–40%
40–50%
50–60%
60–70%
70–80%
Tie:
31.48% (between Cantrell and Heno)
Mayor before election
LaToya Cantrell
Democratic
Elected Mayor
LaToya Cantrell
Democratic

The 2021 New Orleans mayoral election was held on November 13, 2021, to elect the mayor of New Orleans, Louisiana. Originally scheduled to be held on October 9, 2021, the election was delayed five weeks by Louisiana Governor John Bel Edwards following heavy damage in the city by Hurricane Ida. A runoff was scheduled for December 11, 2021, but was ultimately unnecessary. The election was a Louisiana primary where all candidates appeared on the same ballot.

Incumbent mayor LaToya Cantrell was first elected in 2017 with 60.3% of the vote. During her re-election bid, she avoided a runoff after winning 64.7% of the vote.

== Candidates ==
=== Democratic Party ===
==== Declared ====
- Eldon "El" Anderson, community organizer
- Belden "Noonie Man" Batiste, activist and perennial candidate
- LaToya Cantrell, incumbent mayor
- Luke Fontana, attorney and artist
- Johnese Smith, 2017 candidate for mayor

==== Declined ====
- Royce Duplessis, state representative from the 93rd district
- Helena Moreno, president of the New Orleans City Council

=== Republican Party ===
==== Declared ====
- Vina Nguyen, businesswoman

=== Independent Party ===
==== Declared ====
- Joseph Amato
- Douglas Bentley I
- Matthew Hill, 2017 candidate for mayor
- Nathaniel "Nate" Jones

=== No party affiliation ===
==== Declared ====
- Manny "Chevrolet" Bruno, perennial candidate
- Byron Cole, 2017 candidate for mayor
- Leilani Heno, business owner and motivational speaker
- Reginald Merchant

== Endorsements ==
LaToya Cantrell (D)

Individuals

- Gary Chambers, activist and candidate for Louisiana's 2nd congressional district in 2021

== Results ==
2021 New Orleans mayoral primary
Party	Candidate	Votes	%
Democratic	LaToya Cantrell (incumbent)	48,750	64.72
Republican	Vina Nguyen	10,133	13.45
No party preference	Leilani Heno	6,605	8.77
Democratic	Belden Batiste	3,863	5.13
Louisiana Independent	Joseph Amato	1,256	1.67
Democratic	Eldon Delloyd Anderson	987	1.31
No party preference	Byron Stephan Cole	919	1.22
Democratic	Luke Fontana	720	0.96
No party preference	Manny Bruno	578	0.77
Democratic	Johnese Smith	553	0.73
Louisiana Independent	Matthew Hill	535	0.71
Louisiana Independent	Nathaniel Jones	231	0.31
Louisiana Independent	Douglas Bentley	163	0.22
No party preference	Reginald Merchant	32	0.04
Total votes		75,325	100.00
Democratic hold			
