= State v. Demesme =

Louisiana court case

State of Louisiana v. Demesme, 228 So. 3d 1206 (2018), was a Louisiana Supreme Court case in which the court held that the police had not denied defendant Warren Demesme his right to counsel by continuing to interrogate him without an attorney after a remark from him that was transcribed by the state as "If y'all think I did it, I know that I didn't do it, so why don't you just give me a lawyer dog 'cause this is not what's up". When Demesme petitioned the Louisiana Supreme Court to take the case, the court refused, and one concurring justice controversially interpreted the words "lawyer dog" to refer to an actual dog. As a result, Demesme's subsequent confession to child sexual abuse was not suppressed, and he later pled guilty to second-degree rape.

Under the 1994 United States Supreme Court case Davis v. United States, police need not honor a request for counsel that is "ambiguous or equivocal"; the issue in Demesme's case was the conditional "If y'all think I did it" and the meaning of the phrase transcribed variously as "a lawyer dog" or "a lawyer, dawg". The district judge ruled that the request was ambiguous because of the conditional's subjectivity. The Louisiana Supreme Court refused to review the ruling; they did not give a rationale, but Justice Scott Crichton in a concurring opinion argued that the phrase "lawyer dog" was "ambiguous and equivocal". Commentators in academia, the press, and on the internet widely criticized Crichton's analysis, arguing that Demesme, a Black man who spoke African-American Vernacular English, was using the term dawg to refer to the officers, not a literal canine lawyer. Some argued that Crichton's misunderstanding of that term was linguistic discrimination, saying that Demesme had been denied his Fifth Amendment and Sixth Amendment rights because of his dialect and by extension his ethnicity. Other scholars argued that while Crichton's "lawyer dog" interpretation was clearly incorrect, the parts of Demesme's statement in which he said "if y'all think I did it" and "why don't you" could potentially make the statement ambiguous.

== Background ==
Warren Demesme, then a 24-year-old resident of Harvey, Louisiana, was arrested in October 2015 on suspicion of two instances of child sexual abuse, including the rape of a preteen girl. Waiving his Miranda rights, he consented to two interviews by New Orleans police officers without an attorney present, repeatedly denying the accusations. At one point in the second interview, he made a statement to the interrogating detective that was later transcribed as "If y'all think I did it, I know that I didn't do it, so why don't you just give me a lawyer dog 'cause this is not what's up". The detective continued to interrogate him, and Demesme subsequently confessed to one of the two charges. In advance of a trial where a rape conviction would carry a mandatory minimum sentence of life in prison, Demesme moved to suppress the incriminating statements made to the detective.

Demesme spoke African-American Vernacular English (AAVE), a dialect of English mainly spoken by Black Americans in United States urban areas. By contrast, most formal communication in the United States is conducted in Standard American English (SAE), which has significant differences from AAVE in its grammar, syntax, and lexicon. Because of the United States' history of racism against Black Americans, AAVE speakers face discrimination from non-speakers and institutions that rely on SAE, who sometimes characterize AAVE speakers as less intelligent or making grammatical mistakes. While some scholars have described AAVE as its own language and some non-speakers consider it to simply be improper English, most linguists understand AAVE to be its own dialect, a variation of SAE with distinctive rules governing its grammar and syntax.

The Fifth Amendment to the United States Constitution guarantees the right against self-incrimination and the Sixth Amendment guarantees the right to an attorney; both of those rights also apply to the states because of the Fourteenth Amendment. The United States Supreme Court's landmark ruling in Miranda v. Arizona (1966) held that when someone is under custodial interrogation, any statements they make are inadmissible unless they are made aware of their rights and waive them knowingly. Under the court's later ruling in Edwards v. Arizona (1981), when a suspect requests an attorney, police may not ask them questions until the attorney arrives. However, the court also ruled in Davis v. United States (1994) that the statement "maybe I should talk to a lawyer" did not count as an invocation of the right to counsel because an invocation of the right to counsel cannot be "ambiguous or equivocal", although it did note that suspects do not have to "speak with the discrimination of an Oxford don".

== Case ==
Demesme's public defense attorneys at Orleans Public Defenders argued that his request for a lawyer made his subsequent statements inadmissible, while the prosecution argued that his request was ambiguous because it depended on "if y'all [officers] think I did it". His motion was denied by Criminal District Judge Karen Herman on September 16, 2016; the Louisiana Fourth Circuit Court of Appeal denied certiorari, refusing to take the case. Demesme then petitioned the Louisiana Supreme Court, which denied certiorari by a 6–1 margin with Justice Jefferson D. Hughes III dissenting. While the majority did not issue a rationale, Justice Scott Crichton wrote a concurring opinion in order to "spotlight the very important constitutional issue regarding the invocation of counsel during a law enforcement interview." Crichton cited the holding in Davis that ambiguous requests do not require that interrogation be paused, and concluded that Demesme's "ambiguous and equivocal reference to a 'lawyer dog' does not constitute an invocation of counsel that warrants termination of the interview".

Demesme pled guilty to one count of second-degree rape on April 13, 2018.

== Reaction and analysis ==
Crichton's concurrence, and particularly his interpretation of Demesme's statement as a request for a "lawyer dog", was mocked heavily on the internet and drew significant criticism from journalists and legal commentators. Commentators widely agreed that Demesme was not asking for a canine lawyer when he said what the office of the Orleans Parish District Attorney transcribed as "give me a lawyer dog"; instead, he was addressing the officers as dawg, an AAVE term similar to man, in the same way one might say "give me a lawyer, man". In that light, scholars and journalists argued that the quote was inaccurately transcribed and should have read "... why don't you just give me a lawyer, dawg, 'cause this is not what's up". In 2024, Kansas Supreme Court Justice Evelyn Wilson, concurring and dissenting in part from a decision of that court, referenced Crichton's Demesme opinion as an "exercise[] in linguistic contortionism" that "pass[ed] beyond the point of parody".

Some commentators further argued that Crichton's opinion showed how AAVE speakers, and Black Americans by extension, were being mistreated by the justice system. They claimed that his statement was an unambiguous request for a lawyer and he should have been given one due to his Fifth and Sixth Amendment right to counsel. They argued that by denying the request on the basis of his use of the AAVE word dawg, whether the officers misunderstood the statement or actively ignored it, the justice system was committing linguistic discrimination by violating his rights because of his race. American linguistics professor Dennis Baron wrote that "the police and Judge Crichton willfully ignored the prisoner's assertion of his rights and then pretended that they didn’t understand him. Not because he spoke ambiguously, or informally, but because he spoke black." Some commentators drew parallels between Demesme and the testimony of Rachel Jeantel in the trial of George Zimmerman, pointing to the widespread belief that Jeantel's testimony was not credible or even that Jeantel was unintelligent solely because she spoke AAVE.

Some commentators argued that Crichton's opinion was inconsistent with Davis v. United States, pointing to the United States Supreme Court's holding that the suspect does not have to "speak with the discrimination of an Oxford don" in order to unambiguously request a lawyer. However, several scholars also stated that other parts of Demesme's statement like "why don't you just [give me a lawyer]" and "if y'all think I did it" were still potential sources of ambiguity that could have kept the statement from passing the Davis test.

== See also ==
- African-American Vernacular English and social context

== Notes and references ==
=== Academic sources ===
- Herbert, Christopher A. (2018). "Context is king: Lawyer dogs, pure applesauce, and your Miranda right to counsel" (PDF). Tulane Law Review. 92.
- Altman, Zariah (2022). "Speech on trial? An exploration into the effects of lingual discrimination on African American Vernacular English speakers". Howard Law Journal. 65 (3): 503–532.
- McMillan, Mason (2022). "Judges be trippin: A legal analysis of black English in the courtroom". Tulsa Law Review. 57 (2): 451–488.
- Hilton, Tiffany (2022). "The danger of unfair prejudice: racial disparities in the Federal Rules of Evidence". Stetson Law Review. 52 (1): 153–184.

=== Other sources ===
- Krayewski, Ed (October 30, 2017). "He said he wanted a 'lawyer[,] dog'; the court ruled that was too vague". Reason.
- Daley, Ken (October 31, 2017). "Orleans rape suspect's 'lawyer dog' request lacking, state Supreme Court finds". NOLA.com.
- McCray, Rebecca (October 31, 2017). "When 'ambiguity' can mean life in prison". The Appeal.
- Stern, Mark Joseph (October 31, 2017). "Suspect asks for 'a lawyer, dawg.' Judge says he asked for 'a lawyer dog.'". Slate.
- Jackman, Tom (November 2, 2017). "The suspect told police 'give me a lawyer dog'. The court says he wasn't asking for a lawyer". The Washington Post.
- Kerr, Orin (November 3, 2017). "The 'lawyer dog' decision isn't obviously wrong". The Washington Post. The Volokh Conspiracy.
- McGill, Kevin (November 3, 2017). "Response to man's plea for 'lawyer dog' has internet howling". Associated Press.
- Baron, Dennis (November 4, 2017). "Miranda and the Louisiana lawyer dog: a case of talking while black". The Web of Language.
- Rosenfeld, Jordana (January 29, 2018). "In the legal system, talking white is a precursor to justice – and that's wrong". The Nation.
- "Case #528008, Orleans Parish Criminal District Court". Orleans Parish Sheriff's Office.

=== Legal sources ===
- Miranda v. Arizona, 384 U.S. 436 (1966).
- Edwards v. Arizona, 451 U.S. 477 (1981).
- Davis v. United States, 512 U.S. 452 (1994).
- State v. Demesme, 228 So. 3d 1206 (La. 2018).
- State v. Flack, 541 P.3d 717 (Kan. 2024).
