= Davante =

Davante is a masculine given name. Notable people with the name include:

- Davante Adams (born 1992), American football player
- Davante Gardner (born 1991), American basketball player
- Davante Lewis (fl. 2012), American politician
