= Desiree Charbonnet =

American lawyer

Judge, Orleans Parish Municipal Court, Section B
- In office 2007 – April 20, 2017
- Preceded by: Bruce McConduit
- Succeeded by: Position abolished

Chief Judge, Orleans Parish Municipal Court
- In office 2012–2016

Orleans Parish Recorder of Mortgages
- In office May 4, 1998 – November 25, 2007
- Preceded by: Michael McCrossen
- Succeeded by: Carol Carter

Personal details
- Born: June 5, 1968 (age 58) New Orleans, Louisiana, U.S.
- Party: Democratic Party
- Spouse(s): Bryan K. Jefferson (div. 2011)
- Education: Loyola University New Orleans (BA); Loyola University New Orleans College of Law (JD)

Desiree Mary Charbonnet ( /ˈdɛzʌreɪ ˈʃɑːrboʊneɪ/ DEZ-uh-ray SHAR-boh-nay; born on June 5, 1968) is an American politician, attorney, former Orleans Parish Recorder of Mortgages, and former Chief Judge of Orleans Parish Municipal Court. She is a member of the Democratic Party. Charbonnet is a relative of Louis Charbonnet, III who was elected to the Louisiana House of Representatives in 1972. Louis Charbonnet, III, one of the original 10 members of the Louisiana Legislative Black Caucus, was one of the first African Americans elected to serve in the Louisiana House of Representatives since the Reconstruction era. The Charbonnet family traces their New Orleans roots back to the 1790s.

== Early life and education ==
Born and raised in New Orleans, Louisiana, Charbonnet, the youngest of five children, grew up in the Gentilly neighborhood in New Orleans' 7th Ward. As of 2020, Charbonnet still resides in the Gentilly neighborhood in New Orleans, Louisiana.

Charbonnet attended Cabrini High School, Loyola University New Orleans and Loyola University New Orleans College of Law. In 1990, she earned her baccalaureate degree in communications with a focus in public relations from Loyola University of New Orleans. In 1994, she earned her Juris Doctor from Loyola University New Orleans College of Law.

Charbonnet was formerly married to Attorney Bryan K. Jefferson of New Orleans, Louisiana.

== Early career ==
After graduating from Loyola University College of Law, Charbonnet clerked for then Orleans Parish Civil District Court Judge Bernette Joshua Johnson. In 1994, upon appointment as the eighth associate justice to the Louisiana Supreme Court with the establishment of a sub-district in Orleans Parish, Judge Bernette Joshua Johnson vacated her seat on the Orleans Parish Civil District Court. Subsequently, Charbonnet clerked for Justice Johnson's successor, Judge Terri Love who currently serves on the Louisiana Fourth Circuit of Appeals.

Charbonnet later worked as partner in the law firm of her brother, Bernard L. Charbonnet Jr.

== Early political career ==
=== Orleans Parish Recorder of Mortgages ===
On February 7, 1998, at age 29, Charbonnet defeated the incumbent Orleans Parish Recorder of Mortgages, Michael McCrossen, becoming the first woman and first African American elected to the position.

Sirdaria I. Williams stated in Wonder Women: How Race and Gender Influenced News Coverage in the 2017 New Orleans and Atlanta Mayoral Elections that Charbonnet won the Recorder of Mortgages race "in an upset, defeating an incumbent backed by then-Mayor Marc Morial. Charbonnet's 1998 campaign, led by her brother, benefited from the support of a coalition of black political organizations."

Charbonnet assumed the office on May 4, 1998. She immediately launched an initiative to educate renters about homeownership opportunities.

Charbonnet, who served as Orleans Parish Recorder of Mortgages during Hurricane Katrina, kept the office open during the aftermath of the storm to ensure people would be able to readily access their mortgage records, even as most government offices closed or temporarily relocated out of New Orleans.

In 2006, Charbonnet made headlines when she advocated and lobbied the Louisiana Legislature to merge the Recorder of Mortgages office and the register of conveyances within the Orleans Parish Clerk of Civil District Court's office.

Charbonnet served as Orleans Parish Recorder of Mortgages for nearly 10 years.

=== Orleans Parish Municipal Court Judge ===
In 2007, Charbonnet ran to serve out the final 14 months of the 8-year term of Judge Bruce McConduit, who retired two years earlier. On the October 20, 2007 jungle primary for Orleans Parish Municipal Court Judge, Charbonnet prevailed with 57% of the total votes cast compared to 22% for Tracey Flemings-Davillier and 20% for Clarence Roby, respectively. The Louisiana Secretary of State website states that under Louisiana law "a majority vote is one more than 50% of the total votes cast for that office. When one candidate is to be elected, a candidate who receives a majority of the votes cast for an office in a primary election is elected. If no candidate receives a majority, the top two candidates who receive the most votes advance to the general election."

Charbonnet was the first woman elected to serve as an Orleans Parish Municipal Court Judge. In 2012, Charbonnet was selected by her colleagues to serve as Chief Judge of the Orleans Parish Municipal Court, the first woman to serve in that capacity. As Chief Judge, Charbonnet presided over the court en banc and managed its $4 million budget.

As Chief Judge of the Orleans Parish Municipal Court, Charbonnet received national attention for creating diversion programs that focused on the city's mentally ill and repeat nonviolent offenders—most notably women charged with prostitution. Charbonnet first got involved in creating new diversion court programs as part of the New Orleans task force of the American Bar Association's Racial Justice Improvement Project. Charbonnet led the charge to start a diversion court for mental illness in 2014, partnering with the city's health department for a two-year pilot. In 2014, in partnership with Women With a Vision and the Orleans Public Defenders, Charbonnet started a diversion court for people arrested on prostitution charges, called Crossroads. The mission of Charbonnet's program was to help those stuck in the cycle of prostitution, arrest, and incarceration by offering a community of support tailored to each person's needs and experiences—without requiring guilty pleas.

She's also earned accolades from the National Association of Women Judges and other legal organizations for her "innovative approach to the resolution of prostitution/human trafficking cases."

In April 2017, Charbonnet resigned her position as an Orleans Parish Municipal Court Judge amidst rumors that she would be a candidate in the upcoming 2017 New Orleans mayoral election. In Louisiana, a sitting judge cannot seek another elected position, except another judgeship, without first stepping down.

== 2017 New Orleans mayoral election ==
Charbonnet was a candidate in the 2017 New Orleans mayoral election.

On May 22, 2017, Charbonnet officially announced her candidacy for mayor before a large crowd of supporters who assembled in the Sheraton New Orleans ballroom. The race drew a crowded field of 18 candidates including then Council member LaToya Cantrell, former Judge Michael Bagneris, and businessman Troy Henry.

During the October 14, 2017 jungle primary for mayor, Charbonnet placed second out of eighteen candidates earning 30.48% of the total votes cast to Council member LaToya Cantrell's 39%. As the top two vote getters, Charbonnet and Cantrell progressed to the runoff election (The runoff election is what other states would call "the general election".), which was scheduled to be held on November 18, 2017.

The runoff election for Mayor of New Orleans gained national attention. New Orleans, which was on the cusp of celebrating the city's tricentennial, would elect its first woman mayor.

On November 18, 2017, Cantrell was elected the first woman Mayor of New Orleans with 60.35% of the total votes cast to Charbonnet's 39.65%.

Political Endorsements

- Congressman Cedric Richmond
- Congresswoman Maxine Waters
- Congressman Steve Scalise
- Public Service Commissioner Lambert C. Boissiere, III
- State Senator Troy Carter
- State Senator Wesley Bishop
- State Representative Gary Carter
- State Representative Royce Duplessis
- First City Court Constable Lambert Boissiere Jr.
- Second City Court Clerk Darren Lombard

Labor Endorsements

Charbonnet, whose father was a carpenter and grandfather was a baker at Leidenheimer Baking Company, had the support of New Orleans' local labor leaders and earned the endorsement of the Greater New Orleans AFL-CIO. She also attained the endorsement of the New Orleans Fire Fighters Association, International Association of Fire Fighters Local 632.

== Humanitarian causes ==
Charbonnet has been nationally recognized as an advocate for alternatives to incarceration and has been featured in national publications including The Atlantic. Since 2014, she has worked closely with Women With a Vision and the Orleans Public Defenders Office to establish programs addressing the needs of those oppressed through prostitution, mental health issues and attempting re-entry into society. In 2015, Charbonnet served as a faculty member for the National Human Trafficking Summit in New York.

Charbonnet has been the recipient of the United States Department of Justice Byrne grant and Racial Justice Improvement Project grant.

== Private sector career 2017-present ==
In 2018, Charbonnet reentered private practice and established the Law Office of Desiree M. Charbonnet located in New Orleans, Louisiana. Her practice focuses primarily on the areas of civil rights, Title VII of the 1964 Civil Rights Act, Title IX of the Civil Rights Act, the Americans with Disabilities Act, employment discrimination, sexual harassment, sexual assault and battery, workplace harassment, insurance disputes, and personal injury. Her office has established itself as a "victim's rights" law firm.

== Electoral history ==
=== Orleans Parish Recorder of Mortgages, February 7, 1998 ===
Threshold > 50%

First ballot, February 7, 1998

Candidate	Affiliation	Support	Outcome
Desiree Charbonnet	Democratic	54%	Elected
Michael P. McCrossen	Democratic	46%	Defeated

=== Orleans Parish Municipal Court Judge primary, October 20, 2007 ===
Threshold > 50%

First ballot, October 20, 2007

Candidate	Affiliation	Support	Outcome
Desiree M. Charbonnet	Democratic	57%	Elected
Tracey Flemings Davillier	Democratic	23%	Defeated
Clarence Roby Jr.	Democratic	21%	Defeated

=== Mayoral primary, October 14, 2017 ===
Threshold > 50%

First ballot, October 14, 2017

Mayor of New Orleans election results
Party	Candidate	Votes	%
Democratic	LaToya Cantrell	32,025	39.00%
Democratic	Desiree M. Charbonnet	25,028	30.48%
Democratic	Michael Bagneris	15,405	18.76%
Democratic	Troy Henry	5,270	6.42%
Democratic	Tommie A. Vassel	1,120	1.36%
Independent	Hashim Walters	462	0.56%
Democratic	Thomas Albert Jr.	456	0.56%
Independent	Edward "Ed" Bruski	450	0.55%
Democratic	Frank Scurlock	385	0.47%
Nonpartisan	"Manny Chevrolet" Bruno	264	0.32%
Nonpartisan	Derrick O'Brien Martin	238	0.29%
Independent	Patrick Van Hoorebeek	232	0.28%
Democratic	Charles Anderson	230	0.28%
Nonpartisan	Byron Stephan Cole	212	0.26%
Nonpartisan	Matthew Hill	108	0.13%
Democratic	Edward Collins, Sr.	96	0.12%
Democratic	Brandon Dorrington	92	0.11%
Democratic	Johnese Smith	38	0.05%
Total votes		82,111	100%

=== Mayoral runoff, November 18, 2017 ===
Second ballot, November 18, 2017

Mayor of New Orleans runoff election results, 2017
Party	Candidate	Votes	%
Democratic	LaToya Cantrell	51,342	60.35%
Democratic	Desiree M. Charbonnet	33,729	39.65%
Total votes		85,071	100%
