= 2003 Louisiana lieutenant gubernatorial election =

- October 4, 2003
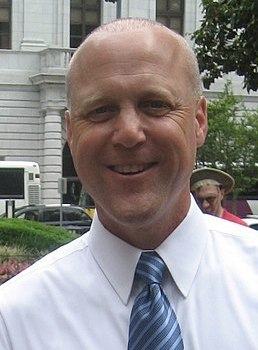

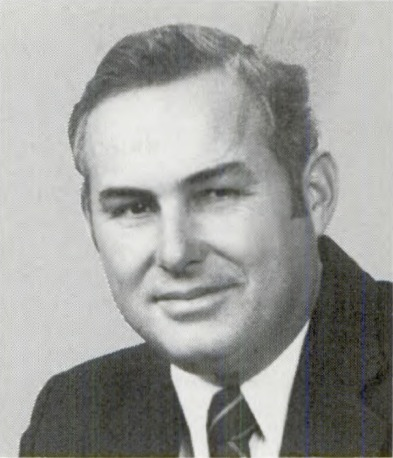
Candidate	Mitch Landrieu	Clyde C. Holloway
Party	Democratic	Republican
Popular vote	674,803	249,668
Percentage	52.68%	19.49%
Candidate	Melinda Schwegmann	Kirt B. Bennett
Party	Republican	Republican
Popular vote	215,402	108,293
Percentage	16.82%	8.46%
- Parish results Landrieu: 40–50% 50–60% 60–70% 70–80% Holloway: 40–50% 50–60%
Lieutenant Governor before election
Kathleen Blanco
Democratic
Elected Lieutenant Governor
Mitch Landrieu
Democratic

The 2003 Louisiana lieutenant gubernatorial election was held on October 4, 2003, in order to elect the lieutenant governor of Louisiana. Incumbent Democratic member of the Louisiana House of Representatives Mitch Landrieu defeated Republican candidate and former member of the U.S. House of Representatives from Louisiana's 8th district Clyde C. Holloway, Republican candidate and former Democratic Lieutenant Governor of Louisiana Melinda Schwegmann and Republican candidates Kirt B. Bennett, J. F. Ankesheiln III and Karl E. Schorr.

== Background ==
Elections in Louisiana—with the exception of U.S. presidential elections—follow a variation of the open primary system called the jungle primary or the nonpartisan blanket primary. Candidates of any and all parties are listed on one ballot; voters need not limit themselves to the candidates of one party. Unless one candidate takes more than 50% of the vote in the first round, a run-off election is then held between the top two candidates, who may in fact be members of the same party. Texas uses this same format for its special elections. In this election, incumbent Democratic member of the Louisiana House of Representatives Mitch Landrieu received more than 50% of the vote in the first round, so no run-off election was held.

== Runoff election ==
On election day, October 4, 2003, incumbent Democratic member of the Louisiana House of Representatives Mitch Landrieu defeated his foremost opponent former Republican member of the U.S. House of Representatives from Louisiana's 8th district Clyde C. Holloway by a margin of 425,135 votes, thereby retaining Democratic control over the office of lieutenant governor. Landrieu was sworn in as the 51st Lieutenant Governor of Louisiana on January 12, 2004.

=== Results ===
Louisiana lieutenant gubernatorial election, 2003
Party	Candidate	Votes	%
Democratic	Mitch Landrieu	674,803	52.68
Republican	Clyde C. Holloway	249,668	19.49
Republican	Melinda Schwegmann	215,402	16.82
Republican	Kirt B. Bennett	108,293	8.46
Republican	J. F. Ankesheiln III	17,208	1.34
Republican	Karl E. Schorr	15,505	1.21
Total votes		1,280,879	100.00
Democratic hold			
