= 2017 New Orleans mayoral election =

- October 14, 2017 (first round); November 18, 2017 (runoff)
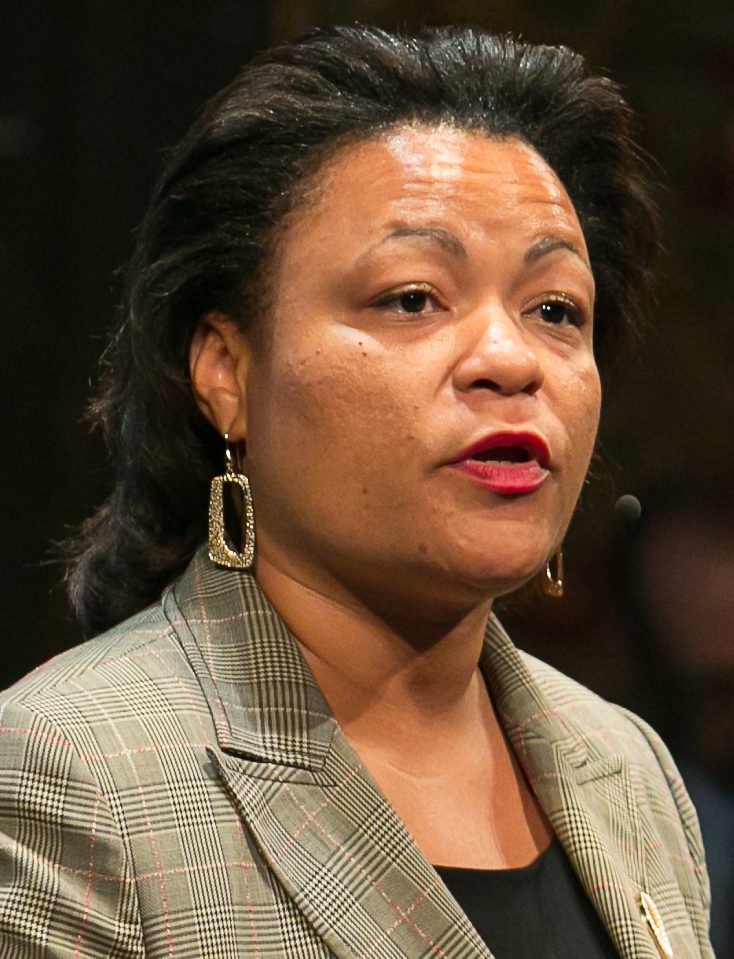

Candidate	LaToya Cantrell	Desiree Charbonnet
Party	Democratic	Democratic
First round	32,025; 39.00%	25,028; 30.48%
Runoff	51,342; 60.35%	33,729; 39.65%
Candidate	Michael Bagneris	Troy Henry
Party	Democratic	Democratic
First round	15,405; 18.76%	5,270; 6.42%
Runoff	Eliminated	Eliminated
Results by precinct:
Cantrell:
50–60%
60–70%
70–80%
80–90%
Charbonnet:
40–50%
50–60%
60–70%
70–80%
Tie:
(between Cantrell and Charbonnet)
Mayor before election
Mitch Landrieu
Democratic
Elected mayor
LaToya Cantrell
Democratic

The 2017 New Orleans mayoral election was held on November 18, 2017. On October 14 all candidates competed on one ballot regardless of party registration (called the nonpartisan blanket primary or "Louisiana primary").

Incumbent Democratic Mayor Mitch Landrieu was term-limited and could not seek reelection. This was the first time since the 1977 that New Orleans elections were held in the fall as opposed to February and March. In 2014, at Landrieu's request, the Louisiana State Legislature moved city elections from the spring, when New Orleans hosts the Mardi Gras and Sugar Bowl (and sometimes the Super Bowl). The change in schedule was made in an effort to improve voter turnout.

== Candidates ==
=== Democratic Party ===
==== Declared ====
- Thomas J. Albert Jr.
- Charles Anderson, visual artist and activist
- Michael Bagneris, former Civil District Court judge and 2014 mayoral candidate
- LaToya Cantrell, New Orleans City Councilor, District B
- Desiree M. Charbonnet, former chief judge of the New Orleans Municipal Court
- Edward Collins Sr.
- Brandon Dorrington, wellness center coordinator with Delta Corps
- Troy Henry, businessman, founder of management consulting firm Henry Consulting, and 2010 mayoral candidate
- Frank Scurlock, businessman
- Johnese Smith
- Tommie A. Vassel, public accountant

=== Independent Party ===
==== Declared ====
- Edward "Ed" Bruski, registered nurse
- Patrick Van Hoorebeek
- Hashim Walters

=== No party affiliation ===
==== Declared ====
- Manny "Chevrolet" Bruno
- Byron Stephan Cole
- Matthew Hill
- Derrick O'Brien Martin, executive director of the Algiers Economic Development Foundation and managing partner at Sugchairo, Moi & Martin

== Polling ==
=== First round ===
Poll source	Date(s) administered	Sample size	Margin of error	Michael Bagneris	LaToya Cantrell	Desiree Charbonnet	Troy Henry	Frank Scurlock	Tommie Vassel	Undecided	Other	Refused
VoicePAC	October 5 – 8, 2017	500	±5%	15%	22%	20%	9%	-	-	24%	6%	4%
Tulane	September 28 – October 11, 2017	521	-	11%	36%	26%	7%	-	-	20%		-
Clarus	September 25 – 27, 2017	500	±4.3%	19%	27%	26%	4%	-	-	18%		-
Market Research Insight	September 20, 2017	-	-	33%	23%	30%	-	-	-	-	-	-
Market Research Insight	September 19 – 20, 2017	400	±4.9%	30%	23%	30%	0%	-	-	17%	-	-
Greg Rigamer	September 9, 2017	610	-	10%	15%	20%	4%	1%	1%	41%	5%	3%
Market Research Insight	September 5 – 7, 2017	400	±4.9%	26%	27%	25%	4%	-	-	18%	-	-
Market Research Insight	August 7 – 8, 2017	300	±5.7%	19%	23%	25%	7%	-	-	26%	-	-

=== Runoff ===
Poll source	Date(s) administered	Sample size	Margin of error	LaToya Cantrell	Desiree Charbonnet	Undecided
University of New Orleans	November 1 – 8, 2017	602	± 4.0%	46%	35%	20%
Democrats for Education Reform/LJR Custom Strategies	October 24 – November 2, 2017	1,000	± 3.0%	44%	26%	30%
Market Research Insight	September 5 – 7, 2017	-	-	41%	40%	-
Market Research Insight	July 2017	-	-	33%	44%	-

Hypothetical runoff polling

with Michael Bagernis and LaToya Cantrell

Poll source	Date(s) administered	Sample size	Margin of error	Michael Bagneris	LaToya Cantrell	Undecided
Market Research Insight	September 5 – 7, 2017	-	-	38%	44%	-

with Michael Bagernis and Desiree Charbonnet

Poll source	Date(s) administered	Sample size	Margin of error	Michael Bagneris	Desiree Charbonnet	Undecided
Market Research Insight	September 5 – 7, 2017	-	-	26%	50%	-

== Results ==
=== Mayoral primary, October 14 ===
Mayor of New Orleans election results
Party	Candidate	Votes	%
Democratic	LaToya Cantrell	32,025	39.00%
Democratic	Desiree Charbonnet	25,028	30.48%
Democratic	Michael Bagneris	15,405	18.76%
Democratic	Troy Henry	5,270	6.42%
Democratic	Tommie A. Vassel	1,120	1.36%
Independent	Hashim Walters	462	0.56%
Democratic	Thomas Albert Jr.	456	0.56%
Independent	Edward "Ed" Bruski	450	0.55%
Democratic	Frank Scurlock	385	0.47%
Nonpartisan	"Manny Chevrolet" Bruno	264	0.32%
Nonpartisan	Derrick O'Brien Martin	238	0.29%
Independent	Patrick Van Hoorebeek	232	0.28%
Democratic	Charles Anderson	230	0.28%
Nonpartisan	Byron Stephan Cole	212	0.26%
Nonpartisan	Matthew Hill	108	0.13%
Democratic	Edward Collins, Sr.	96	0.12%
Democratic	Brandon Dorrington	92	0.11%
Democratic	Johnese Smith	38	0.05%
Total votes		82,111	100.00%

==== Notes ====
After the primary election, third-place finisher former judge Michael Bagneris and fourth-place finisher businessman Troy Henry officially endorsed first-place finisher City Councilor LaToya Cantrell.

=== Mayoral runoff, November 18 ===
Mayor of New Orleans runoff election results, 2017
Party	Candidate	Votes	%
Democratic	LaToya Cantrell	51,342	60.35%
Democratic	Desiree Charbonnet	33,729	39.65%
Total votes		85,071	100.00%
