= African-American Vernacular English and social context =

Socio-linguistic concern

African-American Vernacular English (AAVE) is a dialect of English distinct from standard American English yet deeply embedded in the culture of the United States, including popular culture. It has been the center of controversy about the education of African-American youths, the role AAVE should play in public schools and education, and its place in broader society. Stigma against AAVE, and discrimination against its users, is and has long been common—namely a result of racism against African Americans.

The linguistic and cultural history of African Americans has been fostered and maintained in part through the Black church, including some lexicon and the call-and-response style of linguistic engagement. Artistic and cultural movements originating with African Americans, such as jazz and hip-hop, have also significantly showcased, influenced, or sometimes mainstreamed elements of AAVE in the broader American culture and even on the global stage. The dialect is also popularly seen and heard in advertising.

== Popular misconceptions ==
One myth is that AAVE is grammatically "simple" or "sloppy". However, like all dialects, AAVE shows consistent internal logic and grammatical complexity, and has evolved naturally among a community of speakers. Prescriptively, attitudes about AAVE are often less positive; since AAVE deviates from the standard, its use is commonly misinterpreted as a sign of ignorance, laziness, or both. Perhaps because of this attitude (as well as similar attitudes among other Americans), speakers of AAVE are often bidialectal, being able to speak with more standard English features, as well as AAVE. Such linguistic adaptation in different environments is called code-switching—though Linnes (1998) argues that the situation is actually one of diglossia: each dialect, or code, is applied in different settings. Generally speaking, the degree of exclusive use of AAVE decreases with increasing socioeconomic status (although AAVE is still used by even well-educated African Americans).

Another misconception is that AAVE is the native dialect (or even more inaccurately, a linguistic fad) employed by all African Americans. Wheeler (1999) warns that "AAVE should not be thought of as the language of Black people in America. Many African Americans neither speak it nor know much about it". Conversely, not all native AAVE speakers are African American, and nonnative speakers also incorporate elements into their speech.

Ogbu (1999) argues that the use of AAVE carries racially affirmative political undertones as its use allows African Americans to assert their cultural upbringing. Nevertheless, use of AAVE also carries strong social connotations; Sweetland (2002) presents a White female speaker of AAVE who is accepted as a member into African-American social groups despite her race.

Before substantial research of the 1960s and 1970s—including William Labov's groundbreakingly thorough grammatical study, Language in the Inner City—there was doubt that the speech of African Americans had any exclusive features not found in varieties spoken by other groups; Williamson (1970) noted that distinctive features of African-American speech were present in the speech of Southerners, while Farrison (1970) mistakenly argued that there were no substantial vocabulary or grammatical differences between the speech of Black people and other English dialects.

== In the legal system ==
The United States courts are divided over how to admit statements of ambiguous tense made in AAVE under evidence. In United States v. Arnold, the United States Court of Appeals for the Sixth Circuit held that "he finna shoot me" was a statement made in the present tense, so it was admissible hearsay under the excited utterance exception; however, the dissent held that past or present tense could not be determined by the statement, so the statement should not have been admitted into evidence. Similarly, in State of Louisiana v. Demesme, the Louisiana courts ruled that the defendant's statement "if y'all think I did it, I know that I didn't do it, so why don't you just give me a lawyer dog 'cause this is not what's up" was too ambiguous to be considered a Miranda request for a lawyer. (Note: The transcript of the quote was provided by the Orleans Parish District Attorney's office. Some commentators have disputed its faithfulness to the statement, arguing that it should instead read "... just give me a lawyer, dawg, 'cause ...".)

In US courts, an interpreter is only routinely available for speakers of "a language other than English". Rickford & King (2016) argue that a lack of familiarity with AAVE (and other minority dialects of English) on the part of jurors, stenographers, and others can lead to misunderstandings in court. They especially focus on the Trayvon Martin case and how the testimony of Rachel Jeantel was perceived as incomprehensible and not credible by the jury due to her dialect.

A 2019 experimental study by researchers at the University of Pennsylvania, NYU, and Philadelphia Lawyers for Social Equity, found that court stenographers in Philadelphia regularly fail to transcribe AAVE accurately, with about 40 percent of sentences being inaccurate, and only 83% accuracy at the word level, despite court stenographers being certified at or above 95% accuracy. Their study suggests that there is evidence that court reporters may potentially introduce incorrect transcriptions into the official court record, with ramifications in cross-examination, jury deliberations, and appeals. A 2016 qualitative study by researchers at Stanford University also suggests that testimony in AAVE—and other nonstandard varieties—is not necessarily always understood in a judicial setting. Some legal scholars have argued that these findings show a due process violation.

== In music ==
Spirituals, blues, jazz, R&B, and most recently, hip-hop are all genres falling under African-American music; as such, AAVE usually appears, through singing, speaking, or rapping, in these musical forms. Examples of morphosyntactic features of AAVE in genres other than hip-hop are given below:

| Artist | Song | Lyric | AAVE feature |
|---|---|---|---|
| Nina Simone | "It Be's That Way Sometime" | "It Be's That Way Sometime" | habitual aspect with be |
| Vera Hall | "Trouble So Hard" | "Don't nobody know my trouble but God" | negative concord |
| Texas Alexander | "The Rising Sun" | "She got something round, and it look just like a bat" | lack of inflection on present-tense verb |
| WC Handy | "The St. Louis Blues" | "'Cause my baby, he done left this town" | use of "done" to indicate the recent past |

More recently, AAVE has been used heavily in hip-hop to show "street cred". Examples of morphosyntactic AAVE features used by Black hip-hop artists are given below:

| Artist | Song | Lyric | AAVE feature |
|---|---|---|---|
| LL Cool J | "Control Myself" | "She said her name Shayeeda" | absence of copula |
| LL Cool J | "Control Myself" | "I could tell her mama feed her" | lack of inflection on present-tense verb |
| Jay-Z and Kanye West | "Gotta Have It" | "You can bank I ain't got no ceilin'" | negative concord |

In addition to grammatical features, lexical items specific to AAVE are often used in hip-hop:

| Artist | Song | Lyric | AAVE lexical item^{a} | Standard English definition |
|---|---|---|---|---|
| Jay-Z and Kanye West | "Otis" | "Or the big-face rollie, I got two of those" | rollie | Rolex (watch) |
| Tupac Shakur | "Straight Ballin" | "And getting ghost on the 5-0" | 5-0 ("five-oh") | police |
| Lil Wayne | "Blinded" | "I can put bangles around yo' ashy ankles" | ashy | dry skin |

^aLexical items taken from Smitherman (2000)

Because hip-hop is so intimately related to the African-American oral tradition, non-Black hip-hop artists also use certain features of AAVE; for example, in an MC battle, Eyedea said, "What that mean, yo?" dropping the "auxiliary do". However, they tend to avoid the term nigga, even as a marker of solidarity. White hip-hop artists such as Eyedea can choose to accentuate their whiteness by hyper-articulating postvocalic r sounds (i.e. the retroflex approximant).

AAVE is also used by non-Black artists in genres other than hip-hop, if less frequently. For instance, in "Tonight, Tonight", Hot Chelle Rae uses the term dime to mean "an attractive woman". Jewel's "Sometimes It Be That Way" employs habitual be in the title to indicate habitual aspect. If they do not employ similar features of AAVE in their speech, then it can be argued that they are modeling their musical performance to evoke aspects of particular musical genres such as R&B or the blues (as British pop musicians of the 1960s and beyond did to evoke rock, pop, and the blues). Some research suggests that non-African-American young adults learn AAVE vocabulary by listening to hip-hop music. And may have found that exposure to hip hop music greatly inspires its listeners to learn more about the genre.

== In social media ==
On Twitter, AAVE is used as a framework from which sentences and words are constructed, in order to accurately express oneself. Grammatical features and word pronunciations stemming from AAVE are preserved. Spellings based on AAVE have become increasingly common, to the point where it has become a normalized practice. Some examples include, "you" (you're), "they" (their/they're), "gon/gone" (going to), and "yo" (your).

== In public education ==
With AAVE long facing discrimination and stigma in public education, the Conference on College Composition and Communication (CCCC), a division of National Council of Teachers of English (NCTE), issued a position statement on students' rights to their own language in April 1974. The position appeared in a special issue of College Composition and Communication in Fall of 1974. The resolution was as follows:

We affirm the students' right to their own patterns and varieties of language—the dialects of their nurture or whatever dialects in which they find their own identity and style. Language scholars long ago denied that the myth of a standard American dialect has any validity. The claim that any one dialect is unacceptable amounts to an attempt of one social group to exert its dominance over another. Such a claim leads to false advice for speakers and writers and immoral advice for humans. A nation proud of its diverse heritage and its cultural and racial variety will preserve its heritage of dialects. We affirm strongly that teachers must have the experiences and training that will enable them to respect diversity and uphold the right of students to their own language.

Around this time, pedagogical techniques similar to those used to teach English to speakers of foreign languages were shown to hold promise for speakers of AAVE. William Stewart experimented with the use of dialect readers—sets of text in both AAVE and standard English. The idea was that children could learn to read in their own dialect and then shift to "Standard English" with subsequent textbooks.Simpkins, Holt & Simpkins (1977) developed a comprehensive set of dialect readers, called bridge readers, which included the same content in three different dialects: AAVE, a "bridge" version that was closer to "Standard American English" without being prohibitively formal, and a Standard English version. Despite studies that showed promise for such "Standard English as a Second Dialect" (SESD) programs, reaction to them was largely hostile and both Stewart's research and the Bridge Program were rejected for various political and social reasons, including strong resistance from parents.

A more formal shift in the recognition of AAVE came in the "Ann Arbor Decision" of 1979 (Martin Luther King Junior Elementary School Children et al., v. Ann Arbor School District). In it, a federal judge of the Eastern District of Michigan ruled that in teaching Black children to read, a school board must adjust to the children's dialect, not the children to the school, and that, by not taking students' language into consideration, teachers were contributing to the failure of such students to read and use mainstream English proficiently.

National attitudes towards AAVE were revisited when a controversial resolution from the Oakland, California school board (Oakland Unified School District) on December 18, 1996, called for "Ebonics" to be recognized as a language of African Americans. In fact, ebonics would be classified as a "second language". The proposal was to implement a program similar to the Language Development Program for African American Students (LDPAAS) in Los Angeles, which began in 1988 and uses methods from the SESD programs mentioned above.

Like other similar programs, the Oakland resolution was widely misunderstood as intended to teach AAVE and "elevate it to the status of a written language." It gained national attention and was derided and criticized, most notably by Jesse Jackson and Kweisi Mfume who regarded it as an attempt to teach slang to children. The statement that "African Language Systems are genetically based" also contributed to the negative reaction because "genetically" was popularly misunderstood to imply that African Americans had a biological predisposition to a particular language. In an amended resolution, this phrase was removed and replaced with wording that states African-American language systems "have origins in West [sic] and Niger–Congo languages and are not merely dialects of English ..."

The Oakland proposal was explained as follows: that Black students would perform better in school and more easily learn standard American English if textbooks and teachers incorporated AAVE in teaching Black children to speak Standard English rather than mistakenly equating nonstandard with substandard and dismissing AAVE as the latter. Baratz & Shuy (1969:93) point to these linguistic barriers, and common reactions by teachers, as a primary cause of reading difficulties and poor school performance. According to the 2013 National Assessment of Educational Progress (NAEP), 55% of White students were below the "basic" levels while 83% of African-American fourth graders were under "basic" reading. The school environment is one larger factor hindering African-American students' success in literacy.

More recently, research has been conducted on the over-representation of African Americans in special education argue that this is because AAVE speech characteristics are often erroneously considered to be signs of speech development problems, prompting teachers to refer children to speech pathologists. The Individuals with Disabilities Education Improvement Act (IDEA) of 2004 may be one cause of this discrepancy (PL 108-446). IDEA was intended to guarantee that all students with disabilities in U.S. schools have the chance to receive a free and appropriate public education in the setting with the fewest restrictions. It was enacted in 1975 and has since undergone numerous revisions. IDEA stipulates requirements for pupils to meet in order to be eligible for special education services at school. help specifically for learning difficulties, where environmental, cultural, economic adversities are not accounted for. Due to many African-American students being of lower income, schools being of lower quality with less well prepared teachers and overall less instructional and academic resources, it increases their likelihood to be eligible in special education services leading to the potential misdiagnosis of a disorder in part of their academic difficulties. Misidentification causes African-American children to receive insufficient reading assistance.

According to Smitherman, the controversy and debates concerning AAVE in public schools imply deeper deterministic attitudes towards the African-American community as a whole. Smitherman describes this as a reflection of the "power elite's perceived insignificance and hence rejection of Afro-American language and culture". She also asserts that African Americans are forced to conform to European American society in order to succeed, and that conformity ultimately means the "eradication of black language ... and the adoption of the linguistic norms of the white middle class." The necessity for "bi-dialectialism" (AAVE and General American) means "some blacks contend that being bi-dialectal not only causes a schism in the black personality, but it also implies such dialects are 'good enough' for blacks but not for whites."

=== Ann Arbor decision ===
The case of Martin Luther King Junior Elementary School Children et al. v. Ann Arbor School District, commonly known as the Ann Arbor Decision, is considered to have established an important precedent in the education of poor African-American students who are Black English speakers.

The case was decided on July 12, 1979, by Judge Charles W. Joiner on the United States District Court for the Eastern District of Michigan. The suit was brought on behalf of poor Black students at the school. Gabe Kaimowitz, lead counsel for the Plaintiffs, alleged that the students were denied equal protection of the laws, because applicable Michigan regulations did not recognize social, economic and cultural factors differing those pupils from others. Black middle class students at the school were not represented among the plaintiffs. Judge Joiner in 1977 and 1978 rejected five of the six claims. The sixth claim asserted that the Ann Arbor School District violated federal statutory law because it failed to take into account the home language of the children in the provision of education instruction. The court agreed. The judge ordered the school district to find a way to identify Black English speakers in the schools and to "use that knowledge in teaching such students how to read standard English".

==== Cases that led to the Ann Arbor Decision ====
In 1954, most of the United States had racially segregated schools, which was made legal by the Plessy v. Ferguson case in 1896. In the case it held that segregated public schools were constitutional as long as the Black and White children in the schools were equal. Throughout the middle of the twentieth century many civil rights groups and leaders challenged the school board's racial segregation through legal and political action. One of the actions, Brown v. Board of Education was filed, and is an important and significant case, which ultimately led up to the Ann Arbor Decision. The Brown v. Board of Education case was filed against Topeka and it went over how it violated the 14th amendment. The case paved the way for integration in many public schools across the United States, but Black students still faced many problems as stated in the Ann Arbor Decision.

=== Oakland Ebonics resolution ===
On December 18, 1996, the Oakland Unified School District in California passed a controversial resolution recognizing the legitimacy of Ebonics – what mainstream linguists more commonly term African-American English (AAE) – as an African language. The resolution set off a firestorm of media criticism and ignited a national debate.

For students whose primary language was Ebonics, the Oakland resolution mandated some instruction in this, both for "maintaining the legitimacy and richness of such language ... and to facilitate their acquisition and mastery of English language skills." This also included the proposed increase of salaries of those proficient in both Ebonics and Standard English to the level of those teaching limited English proficiency (LEP) students and the use of public funding to help teachers learn AAE themselves.

=== Popular response ===
Some interpretations of the controversial issues in the resolution include the idea that Ebonics is not a vernacular or dialect of English, that it is a separate language; a member of an African language family; that speakers of Ebonics should qualify for federally funded programs traditionally restricted to bilingual populations; and that students would be taught American Standard English via Ebonics. The Rev. Jesse Jackson criticized the resolution, saying "I understand the attempt to reach out to these children, but this is an unacceptable surrender, borderlining on disgrace." His comments were seconded by former Secretary of Education William Bennett, former New York governor Mario Cuomo, and Senator Joe Lieberman. Jackson would later reverse his position, attributing his initial opposition to a misunderstanding of the school district's proposal. He said, "They're not trying to teach Black English as a standard language. They're looking for tools to teach children standard English so they might be competitive."

==== Amended resolution ====
The original resolution caused a great deal of consternation and anger, which fueled the controversy. On January 15, 1997, Oakland's school board passed an amended resolution. The original resolution used the phrase "genetically based" which was commonly understood to mean that African Americans have a biological predisposition to a particular language, while the authors of the resolution insisted that it was referring to linguistic genetics. This phrase was removed in the amended resolution and replaced with the assertion that African-American language systems "have origins in West and Niger-Congo languages and are not merely dialects of English."

==== Linguists' response ====
Some linguists and associated organizations issued statements in support of recognizing the legitimacy of African-American English as a language system:

The systematic and expressive nature of the grammar and pronunciation patterns of the African-American vernacular has been established by numerous scientific studies over the past thirty years. Characterizations of Ebonics as "slang," "mutant," "lazy," "defective," "ungrammatical," or "broken English" are incorrect and demeaning. ...There is evidence from Sweden, the US, and other countries that speakers of other varieties can be aided in their learning of the standard variety by pedagogical approaches which recognize the legitimacy of the other varieties of a language. From this perspective, the Oakland School Board's decision to recognize the vernacular of African-American students in teaching them Standard English is linguistically and pedagogically sound.

— Linguistic Society of America

Research and experience have shown that children learn best if teachers respect the home language and use it as a bridge in teaching the language of the school and wider society.

— Teachers of English to Speakers of Other Languages (TESOL)

Walt Wolfram, a linguist at North Carolina State University, wrote that this controversy exposed the intensity of people's beliefs and opinions about language and language diversity, the persistent and widespread level of public misinformation about the issues of language variation and education, and the need for informed knowledge about language diversity and its role in education and in public life.

However, in response to the amended resolution claiming that African-American language systems "are not merely dialects of English", there have been some statements in opposition from linguists, since linguists do primarily regard African-American English as a dialect or variety of English.

The ranging conversations around Ebonics or African American Vernacular English sparked linguists to reevaluate and even newly research Ebonics and understand the legitimacy of African American Vernacular English (AAVE) as a distinct dialect of English. "At its most literal level, Ebonics simply means 'black speech' ( a blend of the word ebony 'Black' and phonics 'sounds'). The term was created in 1973 by a group of scholars that did not like the term that was currently being used and the negative connotations that surrounded it 'Nonstandard Negro English' had been made popular after the large-scale linguistic studies of African-American speech communities began in the 1960s. However it was not until after the Oakland Ebonics Resolution of December 1996 did the term 'Ebonics' catch on among linguists and the general public.

The Oakland Ebonics Resolution brought AAVE to the forefront of linguistic discussions and prompted increased attention to the study of AAVE by linguists. As Rickford and King (2016) note, " the resolution drew national attention to AAVE and to the issues surrounding its use in education and beyond '' (p. 1) This increase of contributions to the conversations challenged the misconceptions and stereotypes associated with AAVE. For example, many people viewed AAVE as a "broken" or "incorrect" version of Standard English. However, linguists have shown that AAVE has a complex and systematic grammar, just like any other language variety. In fact, some researchers argue that AAVE should be viewed as a separate language rather than a dialect of English. Rickford and King write that AAVE "differs systematically from the English spoken by whites in the United States" and that "its structural and functional differences are as great as those between English and the Romance languages." They also note that AAVE has a rich linguistic history that is rooted in African languages and culture.

Another important contribution of linguists to the Ebonics conversation has been their work in the field of education. After the Oakland Resolution, there was a debate over whether AAVE should be recognized in the classroom and how it should be taught. This debate has many different views. Modern scholars question the concept of standardized English and AAVE. Scholars concluded that it is harmful to refer to AAVE in a negative connotation. Within a study conducted by Dr. Amanda Godley, she encouraged students to question standard English. The goal of the study was to assist students to recognize that many of the language rules are socially constructed. Another study conducted by Dr. Vershawn A. Young demonstrated that there is a misconception around the belief that there is one set of dominant rules that stem from the dominant discourse. Dr. Young believed that the negative views on the use of AAVE are due to ideas on dominant language ideology. He found that there is the belief that there is one set of dominant rules that stem from the dominant discourse. In Dr. Young's opinion, using terms such as "standard "or "dialect" are more harmful than helpful. This is because these terms reinforce the idea that the dominantly used language is inherently superior. Which can harm the self-esteem of students who use AAVE or other non-dominant languages.

Many modern scholars wanted to discover the impacts of AAVE on students within the classroom. Modern scholars conducted studies that focused on the relationship between success in grade level reading and writing and use of AAVE. Dr. Anne H Charity conducted a study on the relationship between children's familiarity with standard English and reading scores. The group of students that were more familiar with AAVE were found to have lower reading scores compared to the other students with higher familiarity with SE (standard ). Dr. Charity concluded that children whose home dialects differ from SE face a greater academic barrier when reading and writing. With the negative impacts within school faced by students who favor AAVE, researchers searched for a way to both uplift AAVE users while also creating a better understanding of SE. Some argued that AAVE should be used as a bridge to Standard English, while others argued that AAVE should be recognized as a legitimate language variety in its own right. Linguists have conducted research on this topic to better understand the best ways to teach AAVE speakers in the classroom. In a 2018 article, Walt Wolfram and Erik Thomas argue that educators should "recognize and build on the strengths that students bring to the classroom from their home language and dialect." They note that by recognizing the linguistic diversity of students, educators can create a more inclusive and effective learning environment. Similarly, in a 2020 article, Rebecca Wheeler and Rachel Swords argue that teachers should "acknowledge and validate" the language and culture of their students. They suggest using "culturally sustaining pedagogies" that incorporate students' home language and culture into the curriculum. Some researchers looked for specific methods within classrooms that can help bridge gaps while also valuing AAVE. In an article written about promoting awareness for speakers that use AAVE within their writing. Dr. Shenika Hankerson wrote about using a concept called critical language awareness. Critical language awareness is an educational approach that allows students to be aware of the cultural, political, and social aspects of language. Dr. Shenika Hankerson found that critical language awareness is an effective tool in writing courses to enhance the skills students who predominantly use AAVE student speakers. Another researcher named Dr. Amanda Godley conducted a study with three predominantly African American, 10th-grade English classes. Within her classes she used the concept of critical language pedagogy. Critical language pedagogy guides students to question standard English. She suggest that teachers "use to refer to instructional approaches that guide students to critical examinations of the ideologies surrounding language and dialects, the power relations such ideologies uphold, and ways to change these ideologies". Researchers are still continuing to discover different theories and approaches towards bridging this gap.

== In academia ==
There have been open discussions by some academicians as to whether AAVE in academia should be permitted due to its history of disadvantage and discrimination in education. In 2022, data from students in Indiana were collected between 2015-2016 and 2018-2019 statewide and showed that Black students, who most likely utilized AAVE, overall had lower scores on writing assignments, which likely contributes to Black students' rejection rates to higher education programs.

== See also ==
- African-American Vernacular English
- Bilingual education
- Bilingual Education Act
- Castañeda v. Pickard
- Lau v. Nichols - This 1974 U.S. Supreme Court decision established the right of language-minority students to educational accommodations.
