= Davis v. United States (1994) =

- Supreme Court of the United States

Argued March 29, 1994 Decided June 24, 1994
- Full case name: Robert L. Davis v. United States
- Citations: 512 U.S. 452 (more) 114 S. Ct. 2350; 129 L. Ed. 2d 362

Case history
- Prior: United States v. Davis, 36 M.J. 337 (C.M.A. 1993)

Holding
- The rule in Edwards v. Arizona is an objective inquiry, requiring some statement that can reasonably be construed to be an expression of a desire for an attorney's assistance. However, if a reference is ambiguous or equivocal in that a reasonable officer in light of the circumstances would have understood only that the suspect might be invoking the right to counsel, Edwards does not require that officers stop questioning the suspect.

Court membership
- Chief Justice William Rehnquist Associate Justices Harry Blackmun · John P. Stevens; Sandra Day O'Connor · Antonin Scalia; Anthony Kennedy · David Souter; Clarence Thomas · Ruth Bader Ginsburg

Case opinions
- Majority: O'Connor, joined by Rehnquist, Scalia, Kennedy, Thomas
- Concurrence: Scalia
- Concurrence: Souter, joined by Blackmun, Stevens, Ginsburg

Laws applied
- U.S. Const. amend. V

Davis v. United States, 512 U.S. 452 (1994), was a United States Supreme Court case in which the Court established that the right to counsel can only be legally asserted by an "unambiguous or unequivocal request for counsel."

Legal scholars have criticized this case, saying that the bright-line rule established under Edwards v. Arizona is preferable. That rule states that when a suspect invokes the right to have counsel present during questioning, interrogation cannot continue until counsel is present or until the suspect wishes to initiate further discussion.

== Background ==
A bloodstain on one of the pool cues in the recreation hall led Naval Investigative Service (NIS) agents to Robert L. Davis. During questioning, Davis said, "Maybe I should talk to a lawyer." When asked by the interviewers to clarify his ambiguous request, Davis responded that he did not want counsel. After his conviction of murder, Davis tried to appeal, claiming that his right to counsel was declined. However, his conviction was affirmed when his request for counsel was reviewed and deemed ambiguous, and it was concluded that the NIS indeed clarified his intentions before continuing with questioning.

== Opinion of the Court ==
According to the court, the interrogators opted for the clarification method to determine if Davis's request for counsel was ambiguous or not. When Davis said "Maybe I should talk to a lawyer", the interrogators replied by saying that they would not violate his rights. They made it clear that if he wanted a lawyer, they would stop the interrogation. When the interrogators asked for clarification, Davis answered that he was not asking for a lawyer. Therefore, the interrogators did not believe his request for counsel was ambiguous since Davis announced he was not requesting counsel in the first place.

Nevertheless, Justice O'Connor decided otherwise. She declared that the threshold of clarity approach was legally required for this case. Thus, the Supreme Court ruled that an ambiguous and unclear request for counsel, such as David's "Maybe I should talk to a lawyer", does not establish the right. The reasoning was that the defendant's rights under Edwards were not sufficiently requested with his utterance. The request for a lawyer must be clear and unambiguous. Justice O'Connor understood that fear, intimidation, and lack of linguistic and interrogation knowledge may affect the way the defendant requests a lawyer. However, she held that the Miranda Rights should be enough for the defendants to understand their right for counsel, which led to the decision that Davis's request was ambiguous.

== Related cases ==
Davis' case is not independent in judicial history. Many cases have dealt with ambiguous requests for counsel. Among these include Smith v. Illinois. Smith was arrested, understood his Miranda rights, and when asked if he wanted a lawyer, Smith responded yes. However, his request for counsel was deemed ambiguous because he continued to answer questions during the investigation before a lawyer was present, thus terminating his request. In the following case, State v. Demesme, defendant Warren Demesme's request for counsel was declined when he asked "why don't you just give me a lawyer, dawg?" Under review, his statement was deemed ambiguous (the phrase was written as "a lawyer dog" in various court documents). In another case, People v. Krueger, Michael Krueuger claims investigators continued to question him after his request to counsel, thus violating his Miranda rights. His request "Maybe I ought to have an attorney," was deemed ambiguous.

== See also ==
- List of United States Supreme Court cases
- Lists of United States Supreme Court cases by volume
- List of United States Supreme Court cases by the Rehnquist Court
