= 2007 Louisiana lieutenant gubernatorial election =

- October 20, 2007
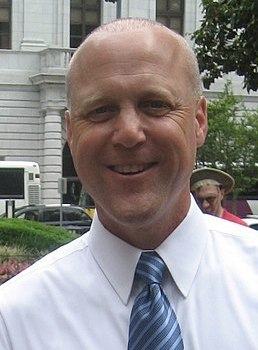

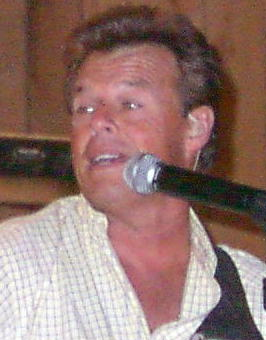

Candidate	Mitch Landrieu	Sammy Kershaw	Gary J. Beard
Party	Democratic	Republican	Republican
Popular vote	701,777	375,964	130,935
Percentage	56.59%	30.32%	10.55%
- Parish results Landrieu: 40–50% 50–60% 60–70% 70–80% 80–90% Kershaw: 40–50% 50–60% 60–70%
Lieutenant Governor before election
Mitch Landrieu
Democratic
Elected Lieutenant Governor
Mitch Landrieu
Democratic

The 2007 Louisiana lieutenant gubernatorial election was held on October 20, 2007, in order to elect the lieutenant governor of Louisiana. Incumbent Democratic lieutenant governor Mitch Landrieu defeated Republican candidate and country music singer Sammy Kershaw, Republican candidate and incumbent member of the Louisiana House of Representatives Gary J. Beard and Independent candidates Norris Gros Jr. and Thomas D. Kates.

As of 2025, this remains the last time that a Democrat has won the office of Lieutenant Governor of Louisiana.

== Background ==
Elections in Louisiana—with the exception of U.S. presidential elections—follow a variation of the open primary system called the jungle primary or the nonpartisan blanket primary. Candidates of any and all parties are listed on one ballot; voters need not limit themselves to the candidates of one party. Unless one candidate takes more than 50% of the vote in the first round, a run-off election is then held between the top two candidates, who may in fact be members of the same party. Texas uses this same format for its special elections. In this election, incumbent Democratic lieutenant governor Mitch Landrieu received more than 50% of the vote in the first round, so no run-off election was held.

== Runoff election ==
On election day, October 20, 2007, incumbent Democratic lieutenant governor Mitch Landrieu defeated his foremost opponent Republican candidate and country music singer Sammy Kershaw by a margin of 325,813 votes, thereby retaining Democratic control over the office of lieutenant governor. Landrieu was sworn in for his second term on January 14, 2008.

=== Results ===
Louisiana lieutenant gubernatorial election, 2007
Party	Candidate	Votes	%
Democratic	Mitch Landrieu (incumbent)	701,777	56.59
Republican	Sammy Kershaw	375,964	30.32
Republican	Gary J. Beard	130,935	10.55
Independent	Norris Gros Jr.	15,961	1.29
Independent	Thomas D. Kates	15,538	1.25
Total votes		1,240,175	100.00
Democratic hold			
