= Edwards v. Arizona =

- Supreme Court of the United States

Argued November 5, 1980 Decided May 18, 1981
- Full case name: Robert Edwards, Petitioner v. State of Arizona
- Docket no.: 79-5269
- Citations: 451 U.S. 477 (more) 101 S. Ct. 1880; 68 L. Ed. 2d 378; 1981 U.S. LEXIS 96

Holding
- After a defendant invokes his Fifth Amendment's right to counsel, police may not reinitiate custodial interrogation without counsel present or a knowing and intelligent relinquishment of that right.

Court membership
- Chief Justice Warren E. Burger Associate Justices William J. Brennan Jr. · Potter Stewart; Byron White · Thurgood Marshall; Harry Blackmun · Lewis F. Powell Jr. William Rehnquist · John P. Stevens

Case opinions
- Majority: White, joined by Brennan, Stewart, Marshall, Blackmun, Stevens
- Concurrence: Burger
- Concurrence: Powell, joined by Rehnquist

Laws applied
- U.S. Const. amend. V

Edwards v. Arizona, 451 U.S. 477 (1981), is a decision by the United States Supreme Court holding that once a defendant invokes his Fifth Amendment right to counsel, police must cease custodial interrogation. Re-interrogation is only permissible once defendant's counsel has been made available to him, or he himself initiates further communication, exchanges, or conversations with the police. Statements obtained in violation of this rule are a violation of a defendant's Fifth Amendment rights.

This bright-line rule has been praised by legal scholars with some scholars stating it was a mistake to move from this standard to that of Davis v. United States which stipulates that the right to counsel can only be legally asserted by an "unambiguous or unequivocal request for counsel."

== Facts ==
Edwards was arrested at his home on charges of robbery, burglary, and first-degree murder. Following his arrest, at the police station, he was informed of his Miranda rights. Edwards stated he understood his rights, and was willing to submit to questioning. After being told that another suspect was arrested in connection with the same crime, Edwards denied involvement and then sought to "make a deal". Edwards then proceeded to call a county attorney and shortly afterwards he said to his interrogator "I want an attorney before making a deal." Immediately, the questioning ceased and Edwards was taken to county jail. The following morning, two detectives came to see him stating that they wanted to talk to him. At first Edwards resisted, but he was told he had to talk to the detectives. The officers informed him of his Miranda rights, and obtained a confession from him. At trial, Edwards sought to suppress his confession. The lower court and the Arizona Supreme Court denied the motion.

== Opinion of the Court ==
The Court held that a waiver of the right to counsel, once invoked, not only must be voluntary, but also must constitute a knowing and intelligent relinquishment of a known right or privilege. The fact that Edwards confessed after being read his Miranda rights does not demonstrate that he understood his right to counsel and intelligently and knowingly relinquished it. Once the right to counsel under the Fifth Amendment has been invoked, a valid waiver cannot be shown just by the accused responding to interrogations despite Miranda warnings having been read. In Rhode Island v. Innis, 446 U.S. 291 (1980), the court clarifies the meaning of interrogation.

== Contrast to the Sixth Amendment right to counsel ==
Under Montejo v. Louisiana (2009), the Sixth Amendment's right to counsel does not prevent police from initiation of interrogation once the right attaches. This is in contrast to the Fifth Amendment right to counsel, where the police custodial interrogation is not permitted as per Edwards.

== See also ==
- Maryland v. Shatzer (2010)
- List of United States Supreme Court cases, volume 451
