= Orleans Public Defenders =

Public defense organization in Orleans Parish, Louisiana

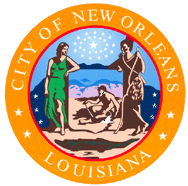
- Seal of New Orleans, Louisiana

Public defense office overview
- Formed: 2007
- Preceding Public defense office: Orleans Indigent Defender Program
- Jurisdiction: Orleans Parish
- Headquarters: 2601 Tulane Avenue, Suite 700, New Orleans, Louisiana
- Employees: ~100 (attorneys, social workers, advocates, investigators, administrators)
- Annual budget: ~$11 million (FY 2025)
- Public defense office executive: Danny Engelberg, Chief District Defender
- Parent Public defense office: Office of the State Public Defender (District 41)
- Website: www.opdla.org

The Orleans Public Defenders (OPD) is the public defense office for Orleans Parish, providing legal representation to individuals charged with crimes in New Orleans state courts who cannot afford private counsel. Established in 2007 in the aftermath of Hurricane Katrina, OPD replaced the Orleans Indigent Defender Program, a part-time panel system that had been widely criticized as inadequate. Between 85 and 90% of people charged with crimes in Orleans Parish cannot afford an attorney and are appointed a public defender; OPD represents nearly 20,000 people per year. Its attorneys practice in the Orleans Parish Criminal District Court, Municipal and Traffic Court, and Juvenile Court, and its special litigation attorneys bring reform-oriented cases in state and federal courts, including the Louisiana Circuit Courts of Appeal and the Louisiana Supreme Court. The office operates as the District 41 office within Louisiana's statewide public defense system, overseen by the Office of the State Public Defender. Indigent defendants charged with federal crimes are represented separately through the federal public defender program of the United States District Court for the Eastern District of Louisiana.

OPD employs a holistic, client-centered defense model. In addition to attorneys, the office staffs social workers, client advocates, peer advocates, investigators, and youth and parent advocates who work as defense teams to address clients' legal cases as well as underlying needs such as housing, employment, mental health treatment, and substance abuse services.

The office has received national recognition, including the Southern Center for Human Rights' Frederick Douglass Human Rights Award (2009), the Innocence Project of New Orleans' Criminal Justice Hero Award (2014), and the National Legal Aid and Defender Association's Clara Shortridge Foltz Award (2015), which recognized OPD as one of the premier public defender offices in the United States.

== History ==
=== Pre-Katrina: the Orleans Indigent Defender Program ===
Following the U.S. Supreme Court's 1963 decision in Gideon v. Wainwright, which established a constitutional right to counsel for criminal defendants who cannot afford an attorney, New Orleans created the Orleans Indigent Defender Program (OIDP). Rather than establishing a public defender office with full-time staff, the city assembled a network of private attorneys who represented indigent defendants on a part-time basis for $29,000 a year. More than 75% of the program's funding came from traffic fines and court fees, creating an inherently unstable revenue base.

In 1993, the Louisiana Supreme Court reviewed the system in State v. Peart, a case arising from Section E of the Criminal District Court, where the assigned defender was handling 70 active felony cases at the time of his appointment, his clients were routinely jailed for 30 to 70 days before he first met with them, and he had no investigative support, no funds for expert witnesses, and an inadequate law library. The court declined to strike down the state's indigent defense statutes as unconstitutional, but found the defense services provided in Section E "in many respects so lacking that defendants who must depend on it are not likely to receive the reasonably effective assistance of counsel the constitution guarantees," and ordered trial judges to apply a rebuttable presumption that indigent defendants in that section were receiving constitutionally ineffective assistance. The underlying funding structure was left in place.

By 2005, conditions had deteriorated further. Under the part-time system, public defenders typically did not learn who their clients were until their first court appearances, which could take place weeks or months after arrest; the lawyers also had to share computers and phone lines. A review by the Southern Center for Human Rights found that public defenders in New Orleans routinely failed to visit crime scenes, interview witnesses, review evidence, procure expert assistance, or conduct legal research, and in some cases did not know the facts of their cases on the eve of trial. At the time, estimates from the Vera Institute of Justice showed that the Orleans Parish jail held 6,000 to 7,000 people — more than any other city in the United States — and that New Orleans' per-capita incarceration rate was more than five times the national average.

=== Hurricane Katrina and the collapse of indigent defense ===
When Hurricane Katrina struck in August 2005, the criminal justice system in New Orleans ceased to function. No criminal jury trials were held for nearly ten months. Thousands of incarcerated people were evacuated to facilities around the state, but their records did not follow them, making it difficult to determine where individuals were held, what charges they faced, or what stage their cases had reached. Many public defender clients were displaced or lost in the upheaval, and with no revenue flowing from traffic citations or court fines, the existing public defense system collapsed entirely. In the months after the storm, at least 6,000 defendants were left without legal representation. Eleven months later, the system remained in disarray.

The crisis created the conditions for reform. The city appointed Harvard law professor Ronald Sullivan to a one-year assignment to revamp the public defender system. Many attorneys on the old indigent defense panel had left the city, requiring a wholesale rebuilding effort. Derwyn Bunton, who would go on to lead the office for more than 13 years, was among those recruited to participate. With substantial post-Katrina funding flowing into the city and a new board in place, the system was reconstituted around full-time, salaried public defenders rather than part-time contract attorneys. The new organization was named the Orleans Public Defenders Office and received significant philanthropic support during its early years. Chief Defender Danny Engelberg, who joined the office in 2007, later described the early years as "a living, breathing experiment, a startup, scrappy group of folks trying to do what seemed at that point insurmountable."

=== Establishment and early challenges (2007–2012) ===
The newly formed office confronted enormous caseloads almost immediately. In 2007, OPD took the unprecedented step of refusing to accept new clients, citing insufficient capacity. The reform also generated friction with judges who had been accustomed to controlling the assignment and management of public defenders under the old system. Several judges held public defenders in contempt of court; in 2007, Loyola University New Orleans College of Law professor Steve Singer was jailed for several hours after a judge found him in contempt because a public defender was absent from a hearing. Singer characterized the judge's reaction as resentment over losing control of the defense function.

Despite these tensions, OPD attracted idealistic attorneys from across the country who were drawn to the rebuilding mission. The office grew with federal and state funding between 2007 and 2011, but caseloads remained far above national standards. By 2011, each felony attorney handled approximately 300 cases per year — double the recommended maximum — while each misdemeanor attorney managed roughly 2,500 cases, six times the national standard and the highest such ratio in the country.

In 2012, OPD's budget was sharply reduced, although partial restoration followed later that year.

=== Funding crises and national attention (2013–2016) ===
OPD's chronic underfunding attracted growing national attention during this period. In 2013, the office stated publicly that it lacked the resources to handle gang racketeering indictments. The New York Times Editorial Board cited New Orleans as an example of systemic failures in indigent defense while applauding the Department of Justice's oversight efforts.

In 2014, Chief Defender Derwyn Bunton led the office in a silent protest on the steps of the Orleans Parish Criminal District Courthouse in memory of Michael Brown, drawing attention to what he called systemic injustice in the criminal courts.

The funding crisis peaked in 2015. The office operated on a budget of approximately $6 million while facing million-dollar cuts. Bunton drew public attention to the disparity between the funding allocated to law enforcement and prosecution — a combined $230 million for police, the jail, courts, and the district attorney — and the $6 million budgeted for public defense.

In September 2015, OPD staff attorney Tina Peng published an op-ed in The Washington Post arguing that chronic underfunding made it impossible for public defenders to adequately represent their clients. The op-ed prompted Criminal District Court Judge Arthur Hunter to summon Bunton for a hearing on the adequacy of public defense in Orleans Parish. OPD also launched a crowdfunding campaign to address its budget shortfall. The campaign drew national attention after comedian John Oliver featured the office in a Last Week Tonight segment on the failures of indigent defense in the United States.

Also in 2015, OPD joined the Department of Justice in challenging the transfer of Orleans Parish jail inmates to other parishes. Bunton also publicly criticized the plea deal given to former NFL player Darren Sharper, arguing that indigent defendants would never receive comparable treatment.

=== Leadership transition and the parity ordinance (2020–2023) ===
In 2020, the New Orleans City Council voted unanimously to require that OPD's budget be funded at no less than 85% of the budget appropriated to the Orleans Parish District Attorney's office, establishing a formal parity benchmark. The threshold was set below full parity because the district attorney handles some categories of cases that do not involve public defenders. Jason Williams, the city council president when the ordinance passed and later the district attorney, said the funding parity made prosecutors' jobs harder "but it makes the system fairer."

In September 2022, Derwyn Bunton departed after more than 13 years as Chief Defender to become the chief legal officer of the Southern Poverty Law Center. In March 2023, the Louisiana Public Defender Board named Danny Engelberg as his successor. Engelberg had joined OPD in 2007 as a staff attorney and risen through the ranks, serving as chief of trials and deputy chief defender before his appointment.

=== State restructuring and increased caseloads (2024–present) ===
In 2024, the Louisiana Legislature passed Act 22 during a special session called by Governor Jeff Landry. The law abolished the Louisiana Public Defender Board and replaced it with a gubernatorial appointee — the State Public Defender — and a new nine-member Louisiana Public Defender Oversight Board with reduced authority. Landry appointed Rémy Voisin Starns, who had served as state public defender since 2020, to lead the restructured system. The legislation was controversial; critics, including several chief public defenders and former board members, argued that it concentrated too much authority in the executive branch and threatened the independence of public defense in Louisiana.

During the same special session, the legislature also passed laws that effectively eliminated parole and allowed prosecutors to charge 17-year-olds as adults, substantially increasing the projected caseloads for public defender offices statewide. Chief Defender Engelberg told the New Orleans City Council in October 2024 that the office had only 37 attorneys handling low-level felony cases — roughly a third of what he said was needed — and 13 attorneys on the most serious cases, where he estimated 55 were required. Additionally, the deployment of Troop NOLA, a specialized Louisiana State Police unit focused on New Orleans, generated hundreds of additional felony arrests that OPD was responsible for defending. Engelberg noted that 13 attorneys had collectively handled 388 life-without-parole cases that year, far exceeding the national best-practice recommendation of no more than seven such cases per attorney annually.

Mayor LaToya Cantrell's proposed 2025 budget allocated approximately $11 million to OPD — a 24% increase from the prior year and above the 85% parity threshold. Engelberg said the increase would allow the office to hire at least 15 additional attorneys and, for the first time, trial assistants for complex cases. He also raised concerns about the office's long-term tenancy at 2601 Tulane Avenue, where OPD paid approximately $500,000 annually in rent and the building had been listed for sale. Engelberg asked the City Council to consider helping the office purchase the building to secure a permanent location near the Tulane and Broad criminal justice complex.

The restructured state system OPD operates within experienced sustained turmoil in the years following Act 22. In 2025, Starns declined to renew the contracts of five district chief defenders who had publicly criticized his policies; more than half of the Public Defender Oversight Board resigned during the ensuing disputes, and four of the ousted chiefs sued Starns and the state alleging wrongful termination and interference by the governor's office. In 2026, Starns backed legislation to further expand the state public defender's control over district offices' budgets and chief defenders' compensation, drawing renewed criticism that the changes would undermine the independence of local public defense.

== Organization and approach ==
=== Holistic defense model ===
OPD describes its approach as a "client-centered, community-oriented" defense model that takes a "360-degree approach" to representation. As of 2025, the office occupies three floors of its downtown building and employs approximately 60 attorneys alongside social workers, client advocates, peer advocates (individuals with lived experience in the criminal justice system), investigators, and youth and parent advocates, providing representation seven days a week including holidays. Defense teams work collaboratively, and the Client Services Division identifies and addresses underlying issues — such as housing instability, unemployment, untreated mental illness, and substance use disorders — that may contribute to a client's involvement with the justice system. The division develops individualized mitigation plans, advocates for alternatives to incarceration, assists with re-entry planning, and connects clients to community services.

=== Community engagement ===
OPD conducts several community programs, including "Know Your Rights" workshops held in partnership with City Council members and community organizations, an annual Injustice Rally and second line through New Orleans streets advocating for public defense funding and criminal justice reform, and a storytelling event highlighting the experiences of people within the criminal justice system. In March 2026, OPD co-hosted a Concerts for Indigent Defense event at BJ's Lounge to mark the anniversary of Gideon v. Wainwright, part of a national concert series spanning Houston, Denver, and Santa Fe.

=== Fellowships and partnerships ===
In 2025, OPD, Southern University Law Center, and the Black Public Defender Association launched the Diamonique Whaley Attorney Fellowship, a yearlong program for recent Southern University Law graduates named in memory of OPD staff attorney Diamonique Whaley. The fellowship, whose inaugural fellow was scheduled to begin in fall 2026, provides immersive public defense experience and structured mentorship.

== Funding ==
OPD has faced persistent funding challenges throughout its existence. Under the old indigent defender program, the system was financed primarily through traffic fines and court fees. After Hurricane Katrina eliminated that revenue, a combination of state appropriations, federal aid, local government funding, and philanthropic donations sustained the rebuilt office.

In 2020, the New Orleans City Council enacted a parity ordinance requiring OPD to receive at least 85% of the budget given to the district attorney's office. The city did not initially meet the benchmark — in 2021, OPD received approximately 65% of the district attorney's funding — but has steadily increased appropriations since then. By FY 2025, the city proposed $11 million for OPD against $12 million for the district attorney, exceeding the ordinance's requirement for the first time.

OPD's budget growth — from roughly $6 million in 2015 to $11 million a decade later — has been offset by rising caseloads driven by new state criminal justice legislation and expanded policing operations, leaving the office continuing to operate well above national caseload standards. Over the same two decades, the population of the New Orleans jail fell from roughly 7,000 before Hurricane Katrina to about 1,400 in 2025.

== Recognition ==
OPD received the Frederick Douglass Human Rights Award from the Southern Center for Human Rights in 2009, the Criminal Justice Hero Award from the Innocence Project of New Orleans in 2014, and the Clara Shortridge Foltz Award from the National Legal Aid and Defender Association in 2015, which recognized OPD as one of the premier public defender offices in the country. The office has also been recognized by the New Orleans Workers' Center for Racial Justice for its advocacy on behalf of immigrant clients.

== See also ==
- Gideon v. Wainwright
- Right to counsel
- Public defender
- Southern Center for Human Rights
- Hurricane Katrina
- Criminal justice reform in the United States
