= Lambert Boissiere =

American politician and law enforcement officer

Member of the Louisiana Public Service Commission from the 3rd district
- In office January 1, 2005 – December 31, 2022
- Preceded by: Irma Muse Dixon
- Succeeded by: Davante Lewis

Personal details
- Born: August 23, 1965 (age 60)
- Party: Democratic
- Education: Southern University, New Orleans (BS)

Lambert C. Boissiere III (born August 23, 1965) is an American politician and law enforcement officer who served as a member of the Louisiana Public Service Commission from 2005 to 2022. He represented all or portions of the parishes of Ascension, Assumption, East Baton Rouge, Iberville, Jefferson, Orleans, St. Charles, St. James, St. John the Baptist, and West Baton Rouge.

== Education ==
Boissiere earned a Bachelor of Science degree from Southern University at New Orleans.

== Career ==
In 1981, Lambert Boissiere, Jr. (the father of Lambert Boissiere III) was elected to the New Orleans City Council, where he represented the D District until 1994. From 1997 to 2005, Lambert Boissiere III served as a constable of the First City Court of New Orleans. In the election years of 2004, Lambert Boissiere III was then elected to the Louisiana Public Service Commission. After Boissiere was elected to serve his first non-limiting term, Senator Willie Landry Mount, and other co-authoring legislators, such as: Rob Marionneaux Jr. and Francis C. Thompson, presented Senate Bill 232, which was a bill to amend the Constitution to provide for a three-consecutive-term limit for positions on certain boards and commissions. This bill was enacted by a House vote of 92 yeas and 8 nays, and a Senate vote of 31 yeas and 4 nays. At this point the Louisiana Constitution, under Article 4, Section 21(A)(2), as it relates to term limitations, took effect after Lambert served his first-term, to which is considered a grandfathered term, and doesn’t account as a limiting factor. Boissiere was reelected to a second third terms in 2011 and 2016.

As of June 2022, Lambert and his four other colleagues, created a 5-Year Strategic Plan, which includes goals for establishing innovative and equitable rates for customers, goals to facilitate advanced innovative and economic infrastructure investments, that will benefit the businesses and the people of Louisiana. The 5-Year plan is to modernize online applications for accessing Public Service Commission information and records. The Plan is also design to educate consumers on issues relating to public utility and provide compliance oversight to protect consumers and public interest.

Lambert Boissiere III is also a member of the National Association of Regulatory Utility Commissioners. The mission of the NARUC is to serve the public interest by improving the quality and effectiveness of public utility regulation. As a member, Lambert’s obligation is to ensure for the establishment and maintenance of utility services, and to ensure that such services are provided at rates and conditions that are fair, reasonable, and nondiscriminatory for all consumers.

After Congressman Cedric Richmond announced that he would resign from Louisiana's 2nd congressional district to serve in the Biden administration, Boissiere was mentioned as a possible candidate for the special election to succeed him.

On December 10, 2022, Boissiere was defeated in a runoff election for the seat on the Public Service Commission by Davante Lewis, a 30-year-old progressive Democrat who centered his campaign on expanding the use of renewable energy.
