= Davante Lewis =

American politician

Member of the Louisiana Public Service Commission from the 3rd district
- Incumbent
- Assumed office December 31, 2022
- Preceded by: Lambert Boissiere

Personal details
- Born: March 14, 1992 (age 34) Lake Charles, Louisiana, U.S.
- Party: Democratic
- Education: McNeese State University (BA)

Davante Lewis (born March 14, 1992) is an American politician and a member of the Democratic Party. He is a member of the Louisiana Public Service Commission from the third district.

Lewis was raised in Lake Charles, Louisiana, by a single mother. He attended McNeese State University and was student body president. He served as a delegate to the 2012 Democratic National Convention while he was enrolled in college. After graduating, Lewis was the director of public affairs and outreach for the Louisiana Budget Project. In 2020, he ran for a seat on the East Baton Rouge Parish's metropolitan council.

In 2022, Lewis ran for the District 3 seat on the Louisiana Public Service Commission. He defeated incumbent fellow Democrat Lambert Boissiere in a runoff to win the election. This made Lewis, who is gay, the first openly LGBTQ person elected to state office in Louisiana.
