= Mitch Landrieu =

American politician (born 1960)

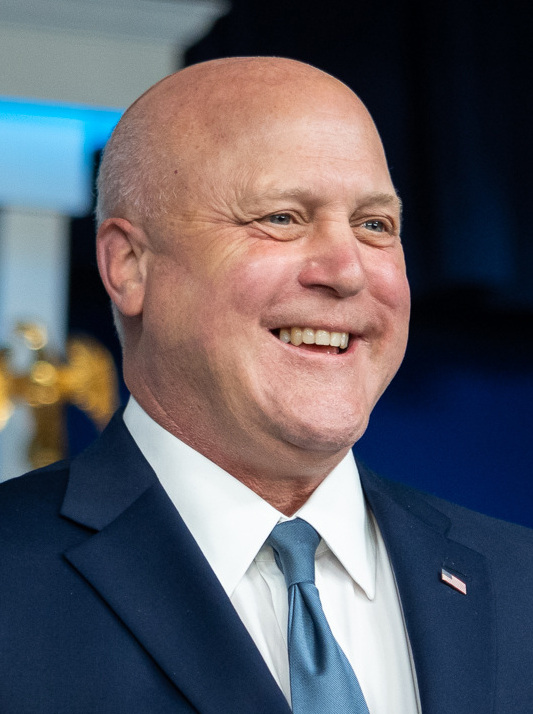
- Landrieu in 2022

Senior Advisor to the President for Infrastructure Investment & Jobs
- In office November 15, 2021 – January 8, 2024
- President: Joe Biden
- Preceded by: Office established

White House Coordinator for the Infrastructure Investment & Jobs Act Implementation Office
- In office November 15, 2021 – January 8, 2024
- President: Joe Biden
- Preceded by: Office established
- Succeeded by: Natalie Quillian

61st Mayor of New Orleans
- In office May 3, 2010 – May 7, 2018
- Preceded by: Ray Nagin
- Succeeded by: LaToya Cantrell

75th President of the United States Conference of Mayors
- In office 2017–2018
- Preceded by: Mick Cornett
- Succeeded by: Stephen K. Benjamin

51st Lieutenant Governor of Louisiana
- In office January 11, 2004 – May 3, 2010
- Governor: Kathleen Blanco; Bobby Jindal
- Preceded by: Kathleen Blanco
- Succeeded by: Scott Angelle

Member of the Louisiana House of Representatives
- In office 1988–2004
- Preceded by: Mary Landrieu
- Succeeded by: Timothy Burns
- Constituency: 89th district (1988–1992); 90th district (1992–2004)

Personal details
- Born: Mitchell Joseph Landrieu; August 16, 1960 (age 66) New Orleans, Louisiana, U.S.
- Party: Democratic
- Spouse: Cheryl Quirk
- Relations: Mary Landrieu (sister)
- Children: 5
- Parent: Moon Landrieu (father)
- Education: Catholic University of America (BA); Loyola University New Orleans (JD)

Mitchell Joseph Landrieu (/ˈlændruː/ LAN-drew; born August 16, 1960) is an American lawyer and politician who served as the 61st mayor of New Orleans from 2010 to 2018. A member of the Democratic Party, he previously served as the 51st lieutenant governor of Louisiana from 2004 to 2010.

Landrieu is the son of former New Orleans mayor and Cabinet-secretary Moon Landrieu and the brother of former U.S. senator Mary Landrieu. In 2007, he won a second term as lieutenant governor in the October 20, 2007 nonpartisan blanket primary by defeating two Republicans: state representative Gary J. Beard and singer Sammy Kershaw. On February 6, 2010, Landrieu was elected Mayor of New Orleans, garnering 66 percent of the citywide vote and claiming victory in 365 of the city's 366 voting precincts. He was reelected mayor on February 1, 2014, becoming the first Mayor to win both elections without a runoff and to be elected by majorities of both white and black voters.

On November 14, 2021, President Joe Biden announced that Landrieu would serve as senior advisor responsible for coordinating the implementation of the Infrastructure Investment and Jobs Act. He assumed office with the signing of the bill into law on November 15, 2021. He stepped down from his role as the infrastructure implementation coordinator on January 8, 2024, to join Biden's 2024 reelection campaign as a co-chair. With the announcement of Biden's withdrawal from the presidential campaign, Landrieu become a co-chair of the Kamala Harris 2024 presidential campaign and also served as a co-chair of the 2024 Democratic National Convention. After the general election, Landrieu was mentioned as a possible candidate for chair of the Democratic National Committee with incumbent Jaime Harrison opting not to run for re-election. Landrieu decided not to run.

== Early life ==
Landrieu was born and raised in the Broadmoor neighborhood of New Orleans, the fifth of nine children of Maurice "Moon" Landrieu and Verna (Satterlee). His mother was partly descended from the large wave of Sicilian immigrants that came to Louisiana during the nineteenth century. He stated in a March 2018 journalism podcast that he is of Italian, French, German, British, and African-American heritage. His great-grandmother Cerentha Mackey was the illegitimate child of a mixed-race black woman and an unknown father.

Raised Catholic, Landrieu graduated from Jesuit High School in 1978 and enrolled at The Catholic University of America in Washington, D.C. where he earned a B.A. in political science and theatre in 1982. In 1985, he earned a Juris Doctor (J.D.) degree from Loyola University Law School in New Orleans.

Prior to public service, Landrieu practiced law for 16 years and became a mediator, focusing on alternative dispute resolution. He owned International Mediation and Arbitration, where he mediated over 700 cases involving complex issues. He was also appointed special master for a major train derailment involving up to 9,000 plaintiffs. He clerked for Federal Court Judge Adrian Duplantier and Chief Justice of the Louisiana Supreme Court Pascal Calogero. He is a member of the Supreme Court Task Force on Alternative Dispute Resolution which was responsible for developing the pilot mediation program in Orleans Parish. Landrieu is trained in mediation and negotiation by the Harvard Law School Negotiation Project, the American Arbitration Association, and the Attorney Mediator's Institute. Landrieu has also taught alternative dispute resolution as an adjunct professor at Loyola University Law School.

== Political career ==
=== Legislator ===
Landrieu was elected to the Louisiana House of Representatives in 1987, where he served for sixteen years in the seat previously held by his sister and before her, his father.

As a leader of the “Young Turks,” Landrieu advocated a non-partisan approach to governing and pushed for fiscal reform in the early 1990s, when the state was in a precarious financial situation. Working with a diverse bipartisan group of lawmakers, he helped focus attention away from partisan fights and toward efficiency and accountability. Landrieu led this coalition, often against Democratic Governor Edwin Edwards, to restructure government instead of cutting healthcare programs and raising fees. He shepherded through the House a constitutional amendment designed to limit Louisiana's debt. Later, in partnership with Republican Governor Mike Foster in 1999, Landrieu led an effort to have the state's $4.4 billion tobacco settlement placed into a trust, allowing the Legislature to only allocate the interest earned every year. He also focused on stimulating economic growth by supporting the construction of major economic development projects in New Orleans – including the Morial Convention Center, the New Orleans Arena, the National World War II Museum and the biomedical district.

Landrieu led the legislative effort to reform Louisiana's juvenile justice system with a focus on rehabilitation and reform as opposed to punishment and incarceration. As lieutenant governor, he continued to chair the Juvenile Justice Commission, the entity created by the legislation to implement the reforms. In January 2004, Governor Kathleen Blanco endorsed the Commission's recommendations.

Landrieu also led the effort by a coalition of artists, venue owners, and other interested parties who were successful in repealing the Orleans Parish "amusement tax", a 2% tax on gross sales at any establishment that features live music. As an attorney, Landrieu brought a case to court that resulted in the tax being ruled unconstitutional. He continued the fight by bringing the issue to the New Orleans City Council, who voted to repeal the tax. As a legislator, Landrieu sponsored a bill to repeal the law that allowed the tax to exist.

He also chaired a commission that worked to consolidate New Orleans elected offices, which became a reality after Hurricane Katrina. Landrieu also vocally opposed former Ku Klux Klan wizard and then Representative David Duke, fighting Duke's divisive and often-racist legislation.

Landrieu crafted legislation to fund the Louisiana Cancer Research Consortium of New Orleans, a partnership between the Louisiana State University and Tulane University Health Sciences Centers. Louisiana has the nation's highest cancer mortality rate, according to the American Cancer Society.

One of Landrieu's most ambitious projects as Lieutenant Governor of Louisiana has been the creation of the World Cultural Economic Forum (WCEF). The Forum, held annually in New Orleans, is directed towards promoting cultural economic development opportunities through the strategic convening of cultural ambassadors and leaders from around the world. The first WCEF took place in October 2008. He has carried on this project as mayor and has even established a formal cultural economy office at City Hall.

=== 1994 New Orleans mayoral election ===
In 1994, Landrieu made an unsuccessful bid for the office of Mayor of New Orleans; the office went to Marc Morial, the son of another former mayor.

=== Lieutenant governor ===
Mitch Landrieu's 2003 campaign for lieutenant governor was his first bid for statewide office in Louisiana. After 16 years in the State House, Landrieu was elected lieutenant governor in 2003. In a field of six candidates, Landrieu garnered 53 percent of the vote and won outright in the Louisiana open primary, thus avoiding a general election. His principal opponents were three Republicans, former U.S. Representative Clyde C. Holloway of Rapides Parish, former lieutenant governor Melinda Schwegmann of New Orleans, and businessman Kirt Bennett of Baton Rouge.

When Hurricanes Katrina and Rita hit New Orleans and the Gulf Coast in 2005, the lieutenant governor was involved in the emergency response. After commanding portions of the hurricane response and recovery, Landrieu was tasked to lead the effort to rebuild the state's tourism industry.

Around this time, he decided to challenge incumbent Mayor C. Ray Nagin. With voting sites scattered across the country and most residents having not yet returned home, he narrowly lost to Nagin.

Immediately after the storm, Landrieu brought together industry leaders and national experts to develop a strategic plan, Louisiana Rebirth, to rebuild the state's tourism industry. It was in this period of recovery that Landrieu began to clearly articulate a governing philosophy that would guide him over the next part of his career. He believed you needed to bring people together to get things done. In order to do so, there needed to be clear command, control and communication. Also, the federal, state and local governments needed to be aligned better—both vertically and horizontally. This means coordinating behind the scenes, breaking down silos and building partnerships to meet the state's biggest priorities. He believed that government in many instances should steer, not row—that it is a facilitator, with the ability to link public, private, not-for-profit, and faith organizations, and help each of them leverage their collective assets.

In this vein, he launched the “Cultural Economy” initiative out of whole cloth to quantify and grow jobs in Louisiana's culture, music, food, film and art industries. He also created the first in the nation Office of Social Entrepreneurship to advance social innovation by supporting the creation and growth of the most innovative, measurable and sustainable solutions to the social problems affecting Louisiana's citizens. These were new and innovative ways to address old problems.

As Lieutenant Governor, Landrieu also chaired the Juvenile Justice Commission to reform to the state's juvenile justice system. Under his leadership, the Commission overhauled the probation and parole systems for youth offenders, established violence prevention programs, and studied the connection between domestic abuse and juvenile delinquency.

=== 2006 New Orleans mayoral election ===
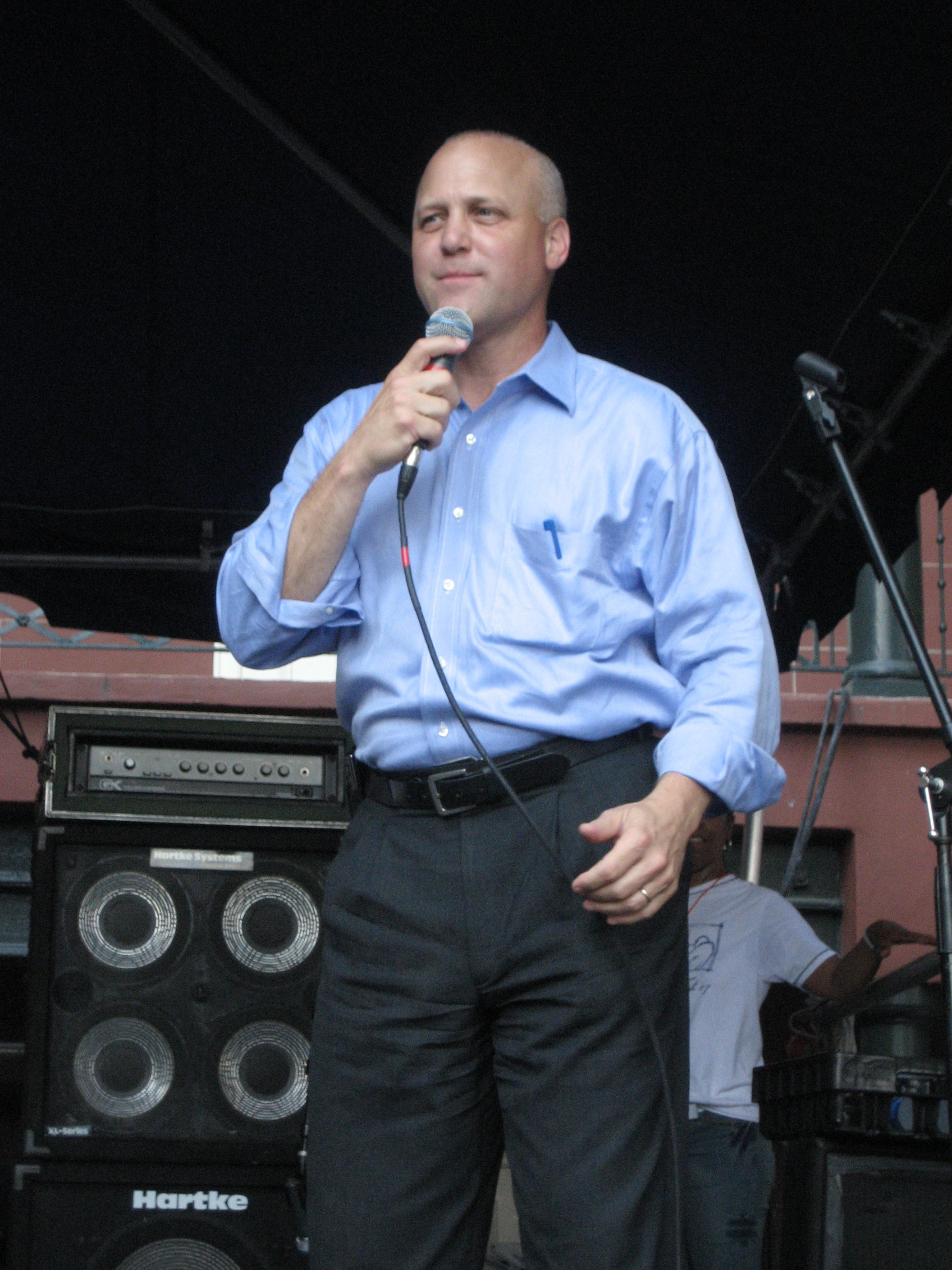
Landrieu in 2007

In February 2006, Landrieu officially announced he would run for mayor of New Orleans in the April 22 election. Before Hurricane Katrina the incumbent Ray Nagin was widely expected to be reelected with little difficulty, but post-disaster problems and controversies had left many New Orleanians interested in new leadership.

In the election of April 22, preliminary results showed Landrieu with the second most votes, with 29% of the vote to Nagin's 38%. Nagin and Landrieu faced each other in a run off election on May 20. With unofficial results showing 53% of the vote for Nagin, Landrieu conceded defeat.

=== 2010 New Orleans mayoral election ===
Although Landrieu had at first indicated he did not plan on it, he ultimately decided to pass on an open race for governor or an easy re-election as lieutenant governor to instead run for the job he always wanted—New Orleans mayor. He announced in December 2009 that he would be running in the 2010 New Orleans mayoral election, in a bid to succeed Ray Nagin, who was term-limited. Landrieu won with some 67% of the vote, with wide support across racial and demographic lines. His outright victory over 10 challengers in the first round of voting eliminated the need for a runoff election. Landrieu is the first white person to hold the post since his father left office in 1978.

=== Mayor of New Orleans ===
Landrieu was sworn in on May 3, 2010, after winning 66 percent of the vote in the primary, winning a majority across African American and white votes.

When Landrieu was sworn in, the recovery from Hurricane Katrina had stalled, the city teetered on bankruptcy and the New Orleans Police Department was under federal investigation. He created a diverse and citizen-led transition committee, made up of six different task forces that engaged thousands in public meetings. He hired the consulting firm Public Strategies Group (PSG) to assess the city government operations and, according to PSG's final report, issued in March 2011, "to identify opportunities for transformational change that would increase the organization's effectiveness, efficiency, adaptability, and capacity to innovate." PSG senior partner David Osborne observed that Landrieu had "inherited the least competent city government [he'd] ever seen in this country and the most corrupt".

Landrieu promoted recovery by fast-tracking over 100 projects and securing billions in federal funding from FEMA and HUD for schools, hospitals, parks, playgrounds and critical infrastructure particularly roads and drainage. Landrieu brought sound fiscal management, balanced budgets, and ethical contracting to City Hall, leading to the city's highest-ever credit rating and over $8 billion in private development. His top priority was public safety—reforming the police department and reducing the city's murder rate.

Landrieu immediately established clearer command and control, instituting a Deputy Mayor system and a new organizational chart for the nearly 4,000 employees and $1 billion total budget. In 2010, facing a nearly $100 million deficit, he closed the city's budget gap—more than one-fifth of the total general fund—by cutting out waste, reorganizing departments and the delivery of core services, reducing boards and commissions, thereby eliminating the city's longtime structural deficit. For eight straight years, he delivered a balanced budget. As a result, New Orleans’ credit ratings were upgraded four times during Mayor Landrieu's tenure to its highest all-time rating. Landrieu reformed the city procurement system. He created the Office of Performance and Accountability to publicly track how well City government is keeping its promises and launched an expansive open data system making more information available to the public and press. His administration developed NOLA 311 for constituents to report quality-of-life concerns and requests. It also launched a "One Stop Shop" permit processing system to reduce permit times and make the city more business friendly.

To ensure the city is building for the future, he launched the world's first resilience strategy, Resilient New Orleans.

As a result of the public investment and new confidence in the city, the city's economy has thrived, adding more than 20,000 new jobs since 2010. Landrieu recruited GE Capital's Technology Center to the city, adding 400 high-paying jobs. The GE Technology Center in New Orleans was announced in 2012 with a promise of 300 jobs. The Center fell significantly short of its employment goals before closing entirely in 2020. The closure ultimately resulted in a net loss of jobs for the city. And spending from tourism has now surpassed pre-Katrina highs. Since Landrieu took office, the Wall Street Journal’s MarketWatch named New Orleans one of the “most improved cities for business.” In 2012, Landrieu unveiled a 5-year-plan called Prosperity NOLA which aims to diversify the economy and add major jobs in digital technology, biosciences, and water management. New retail was booming, in many areas surpassing pre-Katrina levels. The city is now a hub of entrepreneurship activity, outpacing the national per capita average by 56 percent, with $8 billion in private development in the city since May 2010. As a result of growth and confidence in the market, property values are up 50 percent. Under Landrieu, the city began construction on a new, nearly $1 billion terminal at the Louis Armstrong New Orleans International Airport. The terminal added major international flights to improve global business opportunities for the region.

Making public safety a high priority, Landrieu introduced a comprehensive murder-reduction strategy, "NOLA for Life," which launched in 2012. The multifaceted plan comprised 29 different programs, from a Multi-Agency Gang Unit, made up of local and federal law enforcement that focused on the city's most dangerous gangs and groups, to mentoring programs for youth and support services for offenders on probation. Landrieu shepherded major new investments in recreation and public health. Following the inception of Nola for Life, the city saw a reduction of its murder rate through 2014; in 2015 it rose again by 9% over the previous year but still remained one of the lowest rates the city had experienced in 25 years.

Landrieu has also championed reforming the New Orleans Police Department in partnership with the Department of Justice—overhauling use of force policies, leading the nation in body camera use, and improving law enforcement relationships with the community. In recent years and under the Mayor's leadership, the city's criminal court system has implemented pretrial services, electronic monitoring and alternatives to detention that focus on risk. NOPD also began issuing summonses in lieu of arrests for minor offenses to reduce pressure on the jail population and to ensure a smarter focus on arresting violent criminals. These efforts have significantly reduced the local jail population, which now is just one third of what it was pre-Katrina.

Landrieu's re-election bid received the endorsement of The Times-Picayune.

Shortly after taking office during his second mayoral term, Landrieu announced the appointment of Ronal W. Serpas as the new Superintendent of the New Orleans Police Department until the latter's resignation in August 2014.

Landrieu prioritized equal economic opportunity. From his work on NOLA FOR LIFE and black male achievement, he launched the Network for Economic Opportunity, a comprehensive strategy to connect disadvantaged job seekers and businesses to new training and job opportunities. He launched a multi-year initiative on racial reconciliation called The Welcome Table, and the City unveiled a racial equity plan tying the various initiatives together and institutionalizing the strategies in City Hall's day-to-day operations.

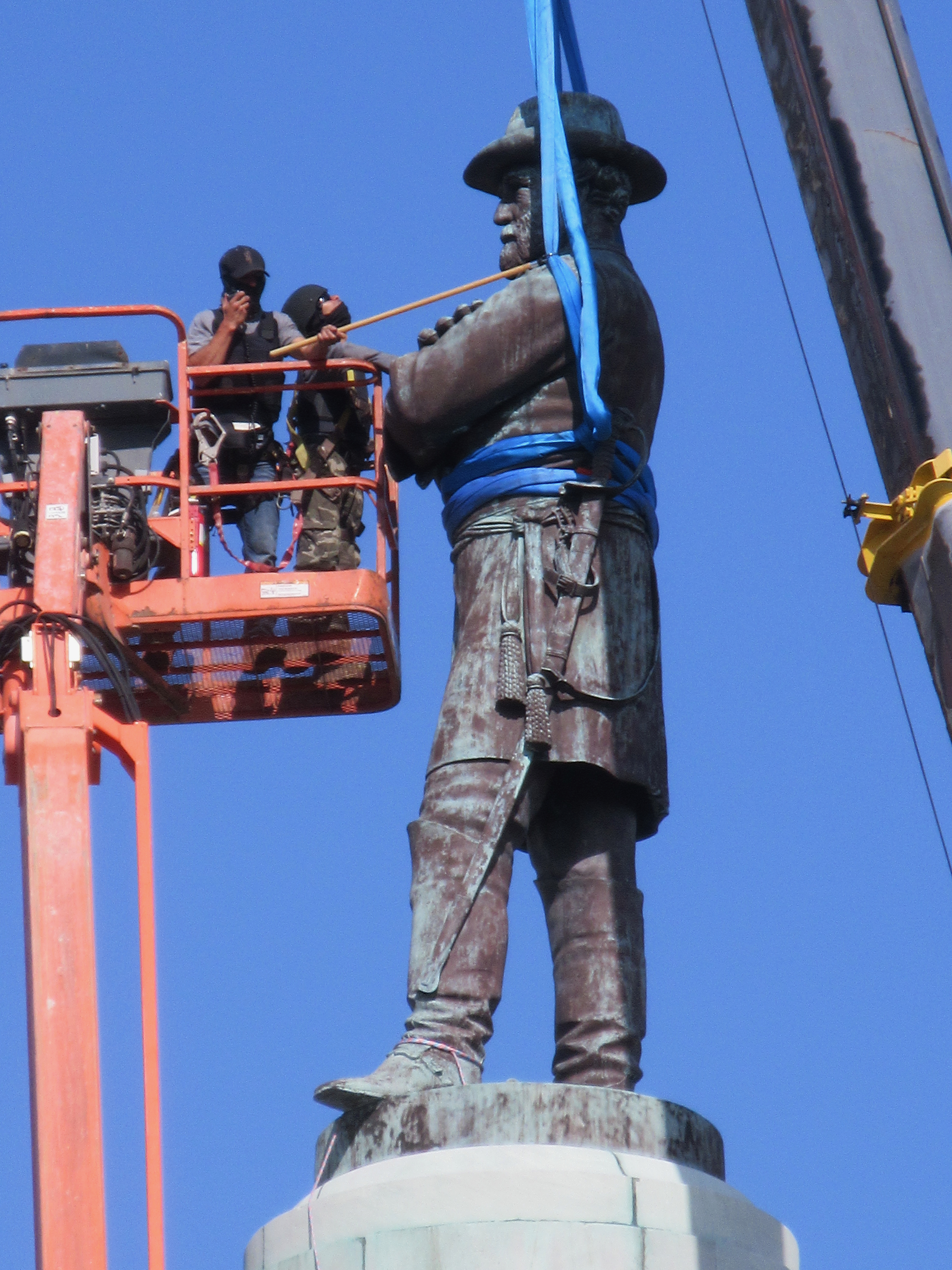
Workers secure the Robert E. Lee statue for removal from Lee Circle, May 19, 2017

In 2015, Landrieu called for the removal from prominent public display of four monuments, three honoring Confederate leaders and one honoring a short-lived, violent coup of the state government by the Crescent City White League. The New Orleans City Council approved their removal the same year. After various legal challenges to removal were struck down, on April 24, 2017, the long-contentious Battle of Liberty Place Monument was the first to be removed. He was criticized by opponents of its removal for his lack of transparency. The statues of Confederate Generals Robert E. Lee and P. G. T. Beauregard as well as Confederate President Jefferson Davis were removed in May 2017. As the Confederate monuments came down on his orders, Landrieu made an address explaining the decision, which quickly went viral, and received praise in national media outlets.

== Spike Lee documentaries ==
Landrieu was one of the participants in filmmaker Spike Lee's documentaries Katrina: Come Hell and High Water, When The Levees Broke: A Requiem In Four Acts, and If God Is Willing and Da Creek Don't Rise.

== Humanitarian causes ==
In 2009, Mitch Landrieu became a supporter of The Jazz Foundation of America. He flew to New York City to present Agnes Varis with the coveted "Saint of the Century" Award at the Jazz Foundation of America's annual benefit concert "A Great Night in Harlem" at the Apollo Theater in support of Varis' and the Jazz Foundation's work to help save jazz musicians, especially those affected by Hurricane Katrina.

In 2015, Landrieu was named Public Official of the Year by Governing. In 2017–2018, Landrieu served as president of the U.S. Conference of Mayors, the official nonpartisan organization of cities with a population of 30,000 or larger. At his inauguration, Landrieu joined with colleagues in unveiling a bipartisan policy agenda that, at a time of partisan gridlock in Washington, D.C., emphasized local leadership on issues such as repair of infrastructure, ensuring affordable healthcare, and fostering economic growth and opportunity.

In coordination with and support from bipartisan mayors across the country, Mayor Landrieu sought to reinvigorate the organization, develop and execute a much more aggressive and strategic media operation, and better deploy its existing assets and those of its coalition partners around a new “Agenda for the Future,” which focusing on security and opportunity. Landrieu has also been highly engaged in major international coalitions of cities such as 100 Resilient Cities, the Global Covenant of Mayors on Climate Change & Energy and C40.

In 2018, the John F. Kennedy Library Foundation awarded Landrieu its prestigious Profile in Courage Award for his leadership in removing four Confederate monuments in New Orleans, highlighting in the award announcement his candid reflections on the moment and its place in history. He is the author of the New York Times bestseller In the Shadow of Statues: A White Southerner Confronts History.

In a 2016 Politico survey of Mayors across America, his peers praised him as the leader “who engineered the biggest turnaround.” Politico wrote, “Mitch Landrieu is enjoying what is widely hailed as one of the most successful mayorships in America, leading efforts on public health, infrastructure and a personal crusade against gun violence.” He was listed as #18 on the 2017 Politico 50 list.

== White House senior advisor ==
On May 5, 2023, Landrieu appeared on TV to field questions on the White House response to the national debt limit deadline, the banking crisis and the state of the U.S. economy with special attention to the April 2023 better than expected jobs metric. Landrieu held a press conference on the debt limit crisis the next week.

== Personal life ==
Landrieu is married to Cheryl P. Landrieu, also an attorney. They have five children.

== Electoral history ==
Source: Louisiana Secretary of State

=== Louisiana House of Representatives ===
==== 1987 ====
90th State House District General Election
Party	Candidate	Votes	%
Democratic	Mitch Landrieu	4,525	50.38%
Democratic	Lyn Koppel	2,973	33.10%
Democratic	Eric Jones	1,022	11.38%
Democratic	James Martin	280	3.12%
Independent	D.P. Crockett	182	2.02%
Total votes		8,982	100%
Democratic hold			

==== 1991 ====
89th State House District General Election
Party	Candidate	Votes	%
Democratic	Mitch Landrieu (incumbent)	8,522	63.31%
Republican	Marilyn Thayer	4,939	36.69%
Total votes		13,461	100%

==== 1995 ====
89th State House District General Election
Party	Candidate	Votes	%
Democratic	Mitch Landrieu (incumbent)	6,692	56.72%
Republican	Jeff Crouere Jr.	3,049	25.84%
Republican	Randy Evans	1,622	13.75%
Democratic	Andrew Gressett	435	3.69%
Total votes		11,798	100%

==== 1999 ====
89th State House District General Election
Party	Candidate	Votes	%
Democratic	Mitch Landrieu (incumbent)	6,575	70.40%
Republican	Randy Evans	2,765	29.60%
Total votes		9,340	100%

=== Lieutenant Governor of Louisiana ===
==== 2003 ====
Louisiana Lieutenant Gubernatorial Election
Party	Candidate	Votes	%
Democratic	Mitch Landrieu	674,803	52.68%
Republican	Clyde Holloway	249,668	19.49%
Republican	Melinda Schwegmann	215,402	16.82%
Republican	Kirt Bennett	108,293	8.46%
Republican	J.F. Ankesheiln	17,208	1.34%
Republican	Karl Schorr	15,505	1.21%
Total votes		1,280,879	100%
Democratic hold			

==== 2007 ====
Louisiana Lieutenant Gubernatorial Election
Party	Candidate	Votes	%
Democratic	Mitch Landrieu (incumbent)	701,887	56.60%
Republican	Sammy Kershaw	375,727	30.30%
Republican	Gary Beard	130,876	10.56%
None	Norris Gros Jr.	15,965	1.29%
None	Thomas Kates	15,555	1.25%
Total votes		1,240,010	100%

=== Mayor of New Orleans ===
==== 1994 ====
New Orleans Mayoral Primary Election
Party	Candidate	Votes	%
Democratic	Donald Mintz	56,305	36.87%
Democratic	Marc Morial	49,604	32.48%
Democratic	Mitch Landrieu	14,689	9.62%
Democratic	Sherman Copelin	11,731	7.68%
Democratic	Kenneth Carter	10,818	7.08%
Democratic	Lambert Boissiere Jr.	5,466	3.58%
Independent	Roy Raspanti	3,740	2.45%
Democratic	Arthur Jacobs	131	0.09%
Democratic	Julius Leahman	117	0.08%
Independent	Jerome Slade	101	0.07%
Total votes		152,702	100%

==== 2006 ====
New Orleans Mayoral Primary Election
Party	Candidate	Votes	%
Democratic	Ray Nagin	41,561	38.36%
Democratic	Mitch Landrieu	31,551	29.12%
Democratic	Ron Forman	18,764	17.32%
Republican	Rob Couhig	10,312	9.52%
Democratic	Virginia Boulet	2,376	2.19%
Democratic	Tom Watson	1,264	1.17%
Democratic	Kimberly Butler	797	0.73%
Republican	Peggy Wilson	773	0.71%
Democratic	Johnny Adriani	115	0.10%
None	Manny Bruno	100	0.09%
None	Greta Gladney	99	0.09%
Democratic	James Arey	99	0.09%
Independent	Marie Galatas	74	0.07%
Democratic	Leo Watermeier	65	0.06%
Democratic	Shedrick White	64	0.06%
Democratic	Sonja DeDais	62	0.06%
Democratic	James Lemann	60	0.06%
Independent	F. Nick Bacque	52	0.05%
Democratic	Elvin Brown	52	0.05%
Democratic	Mac Rahman	50	0.05%
Democratic	Norbert Rome	42	0.04%
Democratic	Roderick Dean	16	0.01%
Total votes		108,348	100%

New Orleans Mayoral Runoff Election
Party	Candidate	Votes	%
Democratic	Ray Nagin	59,460	52.35%
Democratic	Mitch Landrieu	54,131	47.65%
Total votes		113,591	100%

==== 2010 ====
New Orleans Mayoral Election
Party	Candidate	Votes	%
Democratic	Mitch Landrieu	58,279	65.52%
Democratic	Troy Henry	12,278	13.80%
Democratic	John Georges	8,190	9.21%
Republican	Rob Couhig	4,874	5.48%
Democratic	James Perry	2,702	3.04%
Democratic	Nadine Ramsey	1,894	2.13%
Republican	Thomas Lambert	239	0.27%
None	Jonah Bascle	160	0.18%
Independent	Manny Chevrolet-Bruno	139	0.16%
None	Jerry Jacobs	106	0.12%
None	Norbert Rome	84	0.09%
Total votes		88,945	100%
Democratic hold			

==== 2014 ====
New Orleans Mayoral Election
Party	Candidate	Votes	%
Democratic	Mitch Landrieu (incumbent)	53,441	63.57%
Democratic	Michael Bagneris	27,991	33.29%
Democratic	Danatus King Sr.	2,638	3.14%
Total votes		84,070	100%

== Bibliography ==
- In the Shadow of Statues (book)|In the Shadow of Statues: A White Southerner Confronts History, 2018, Viking Press, ISBN 978-0525559443

=== Audiobooks ===
- 2018: In the Shadow of Statues: A White Southerner Confronts History (read by the author), Penguin Audio, ISBN 978-0525639084

Party political offices
Preceded by Kathleen Blanco	Democratic nominee for Lieutenant Governor of Louisiana; 2003, 2007	Vacant Title next held by Caroline Fayard
Louisiana House of Representatives
Preceded by Mary Landrieu	Member of the Louisiana House of Representatives from the 90th district 1988–1992	Succeeded by Pete Schneider
Preceded by James St. Raymond	Member of the Louisiana House of Representatives from the 89th district 1992–2004	Succeeded by Timothy Burns
Political offices
Preceded by Kathleen Blanco	Lieutenant Governor of Louisiana; 2004–2010	Succeeded by Scott Angelle
Preceded by Ray Nagin	Mayor of New Orleans; 2010–2018	Succeeded by LaToya Cantrell
