= LaToya Cantrell =

62nd Mayor of New Orleans

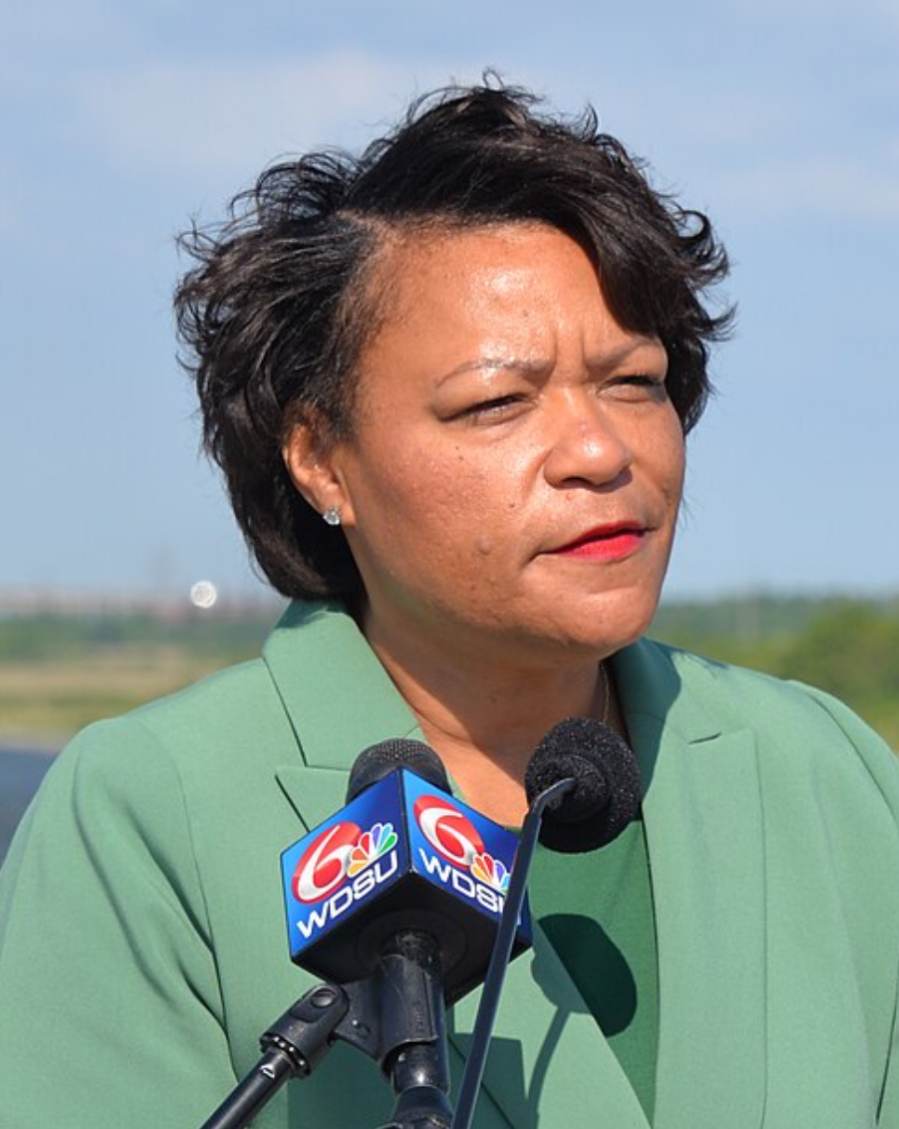
- Cantrell in 2022

62nd Mayor of New Orleans
- In office May 7, 2018 – January 12, 2026
- Preceded by: Mitch Landrieu
- Succeeded by: Helena Moreno

Member of the New Orleans City Council from District B
- In office December 19, 2012 – May 7, 2018
- Preceded by: Diana Bajoie
- Succeeded by: Jay Banks

Personal details
- Born: LaToya Wilder; April 3, 1972 (age 54) Palmdale, California, U.S.
- Party: Democratic
- Spouse: Jason Cantrell (m. 1999; died 2023)
- Children: 1
- Education: Xavier University of Louisiana (BA)
- Nickname: Teedy

LaToya Cantrell (née Wilder; born April 3, 1972) is an American politician who served as the 62nd mayor of New Orleans from 2018 to 2026. A member of the Democratic Party, Cantrell is the first woman to hold the office. Before becoming mayor, Cantrell represented District B on the New Orleans City Council from 2012 to 2018.

Cantrell is currently facing a criminal trial in March 2027 on multiple charges related to illegal activity she allegedly undertook to cover up a secret romantic relationship she had between 2021 and 2024.

== Early life and education ==
Cantrell was born LaToya Wilder in Palmdale, California. She moved to New Orleans in 1990 to attend Xavier University of Louisiana, where she earned a BA in sociology.

== Broadmoor neighborhood work ==
Cantrell returned to New Orleans in 1999, settling in the Broadmoor neighborhood. In 2003, she joined the board of the Broadmoor Improvement Association and became president of the association in 2004. After the 2005 levee failures in Greater New Orleans following Hurricane Katrina, the Broadmoor neighborhood flooded severely and remained mostly deserted for months afterward.

In early 2006, the Bring New Orleans Back Commission, a blue-ribbon panel convened by then-mayor Ray Nagin, released a recovery plan that called for Broadmoor and five other New Orleans neighborhoods to be converted into greenspace. In her role as president of the association, Cantrell worked with residents and local religious leaders to organize opposition to the panel's recommendation. She also helped enlist returning Broadmoor residents in a six-month effort to write a recovery plan for the neighborhood.

Cantrell worked full time to implement Broadmoor's recovery plan from 2006 through 2012. She and fellow residents formed the Broadmoor School Board, overseeing the reopening and renovation of the Andrew H. Wilson school. She served as a founding board member of the Broadmoor Development Corporation, a community development corporation that provided case management and other social services for returning residents. She was involved with residents' efforts to reopen Broadmoor's Rosa F. Keller Library, which won a $2 million grant from the Carnegie Endowment.

She created a partnership between the Broadmoor Improvement Association and Church of the Annunciation, which provided the neighborhood association with office space and hosted volunteer groups. She also formed a partnership between the Broadmoor Improvement Association and her home parish, Blessed Trinity Catholic Church, to open the Broadmoor Art and Wellness Center.

== Political career ==
=== New Orleans City Council ===
In 2012, Cantrell declared her candidacy for the New Orleans City Council seat vacated when former District B representative Stacy Head won an election to an at-large position. After the November election, candidate Dana Kaplan and Cantrell advanced to a December runoff, which Cantrell won with 54 percent of the vote. Cantrell served out the balance of Head's term and was unopposed for a full four-year term in 2014.

As a council member, Cantrell focused on health, housing, and criminal-justice issues. She introduced a bill banning smoking at restaurants and bars within New Orleans, citing the health effects of secondhand smoke on service industry workers. The council unanimously passed the bill in 2015.

Also in 2015, Cantrell began work to open a low-barrier homeless shelter, a move that was objected to by residents because of its proposed placement in Central City, New Orleans. Instead, the shelter was moved to the downtown site of the former VA Hospital. In 2017, Cantrell introduced legislation with at-large council member Jason Williams to register and inspect rental units in the city.

As a member of the Criminal Justice Committee, Cantrell participated in efforts to install crime cameras in her district, assess the effectiveness of citywide anti-gun-violence campaigns, and address understaffing at the New Orleans Police Department.

=== 2017 mayoral election ===
In March 2017, Cantrell declared her candidacy for mayor of New Orleans in a race to replace term-limited mayor Mitch Landrieu. An open primary was held on October 14 and included 18 candidates. Cantrell garnered the most votes, winning 39% of the total. In the November 18 runoff election, Cantrell defeated fellow Democratic opponent Desiree Charbonnet, a former municipal judge, with 60% of the vote. She became the first woman to lead New Orleans in its 300-year history, as well as the first mayor not born in the city since Vic Schiro.

=== Mayor of New Orleans ===
Cantrell was inaugurated as mayor on May 7, 2018, the first woman to hold the position in the city's history. Once in office, she established a new Office of Youth and Families, with the goal of creating a strategic plan to address families in crisis in the city. Cantrell also founded a Gun Violence Reduction Council, tasked with finding solutions to violent crime.

Starting with a push to rededicate hotel taxes collected within the city for city use, Cantrell has focused on her #fairshare initiative to improve city infrastructure, public transportation, public parks, and green spaces. As part of that initiative, in October 2018 the City of New Orleans filed a lawsuit against four opioid manufacturers and distributors.

During the 2019 session of the Louisiana Legislature, Cantrell negotiated the Fair Share Agreement with Governor John Bel Edwards and city, state, and tourism officials. The agreement secured $50 million in upfront funding for the city's infrastructure needs as well as $26 million in annual recurring revenue for the city. Following the approval of the Fair Share Agreement, New Orleans voters approved 3 of the 4 proposals Cantrell and the City Council put on the ballot in the 2019 general election. Voters approved a $500 million bond sale and a tax on short-term rental properties, as well as the establishment of a Human Right Commission under the New Orleans Home Rule Charter.

On August 12, 2021 Cantrell announced the implementation of a vaccine passports in New Orleans. The passport required a negative covid test or proof of vaccination to be shown to enter indoor establishments in New Orleans. Masks were also required at all indoor events and outdoor events of 500 plus people. She was sued by over 100 plaintiffs that argued the restrictions violated their constitutional rights. Their challenge ended up losing in state court. The passport requirements were lifted on March 21, 2022.

In December 2023, Cantrell signed into law new rules that restricted students from converting single-family homes and duplexes into multi-student housing in neighborhoods in proximity to the Tulane and Loyola university campuses.

=== 2021 mayoral election ===
Cantrell was re-elected to office by a wide margin in November 2021, securing 65% of the vote. Her campaign focused on the city's status in 2020 as a COVID-19 hotspot and her efforts, which at times were unpopular, to stop the disease's spread. She also stressed the need for higher-paying jobs for city workers, better public health outcomes and new technologies for the future of New Orleans.

=== Controversies ===
According to NOLA.com in 2017, Cantrell was found to be using taxpayer-funded credit cards for personal expenses which she later repaid. "New Orleans mayoral candidate LaToya Cantrell and her staff used her office's taxpayer-financed credit cards to cover almost $4,350 in purchases she repaid from her campaign funds – sometimes years later, a review of her spending records show. Cantrell also charged to her City Council credit card $4,602 in meals and other expenses that she repaid with her own money after she entered the mayor's race." Cantrell has argued that her actions were not inappropriate given the council's regulations or policies on the use of campaign funds, personal money, and credit cards. She has suggested that the vagueness of the rules for the use of public money indicates a systemic problem that should be addressed.

According to NOLA.com in 2020, several liens were filed against Cantrell, due to her and/or her immediate family owing upwards of $95,000 in back taxes.

In August 2022, a petition was filed to recall Cantrell by a political opponent and perennial political candidate, Belden Batiste. Recall organizers submitted roughly 67,000 signatures, but officials at the Orleans Parish Registrar's office found that only 27, 243 were legitimate, well below the recall threshold. Of the 67,000, a batch of 32,421 was submitted after the petition deadline, but during a legal gray area where they might have been counted. But registrar officials said all but 24 of those 32,421 were photocopies of previously submitted signatures.

In September 2022, Cantrell was alleged to be living full-time in a city-owned apartment in the French Quarter, often coming and going in the company of a personal security guard, Jeffrey Vappie Jr. of the New Orleans Police Department. It was alleged that they were having an affair, leading to the divorce of Vappie from his wife, Danielle, who accused Cantrell of breaking up the marriage.

In August 2023, New Orleans city leaders voted to transfer the use of a city-owned luxury apartment used by Cantrell, back on the market for rent to the public. The City Council endorsed an amendment to an ordinance that will relinquish the use of the Upper Pontalba Apartment to be leased at fair market value.

As of January 2023, Cantrell's administration arranged to have the International Association of Chiefs of Police lead a national search for a new chief of police for New Orleans. On September 11, 2023, after some criticism about a lack of transparency in the search, the mayor announced the hiring of Anne Kirkpatrick.

=== Legal issues ===
In September 2024, a 25-count grand jury indictment against Randy Farrell, a private contractor, alleged that he provided Cantrell bribes in exchange for firing Jen Cecil, a top city permitting official.

On August 15, 2025, Cantrell was indicted by a federal grand jury for wire fraud, obstruction of justice, and lying to a federal grand jury in relation to her affair with Vappie, the related illegal financial scheme regarding his pay, and attempts to cover up both. Both Cantrell and Vappie received numerous charges, with Cantrell being charged with one count of conspiracy, six counts of wire fraud, one count of conspiracy to obstruct justice, one count of obstruction of justice, and two counts of false declaration. Vappie, who was initally criminally charged in July 2024, would be indicted on conspiracy to commit wire fraud, 12 counts of wire fraud, conspiracy to obstruct justice and making false statements to authorities.

In July 2026, U.S. District Judge Wendy Vitter delayed Cantrell and Vappie's fraud trial, which was intially set to start on October 19, 2026, to March 15, 2027, alleging an "arduous trial calendar."

== Personal life ==
Cantrell lives with her daughter RayAnn in New Orleans. In August 2023, the city announced the death of her husband, Jason, at 55. They had been married since 1999.

In 2016, Cantrell was given a lifetime achievement award by the presidents of Tulane, Loyola and Xavier universities and the University of New Orleans for her service to the community.

In a divorce filing which was made public in January 2023, the estranged wife of a member of Cantrell's security detail, NOPD Officer Jeffrey Vappie, accused Cantrell of engaging in an extra-marital affair with her husband since May 2021, stating that "Vappie has been in an ongoing sexual relationship with Mrs. L.C. since approximately May 2021," further stating that she became aware of their "continuous acts of adultery" in November 2022. In August 2025, it was reported that Cantrell's romantic affair with Vappie continued until 2024.

== See also ==
- List of mayors of the 50 largest cities in the United States

Political offices
Preceded by Mitch Landrieu	Mayor of New Orleans; 2018–2026	Succeeded by Helena Moreno
