= List of presidential trips made by George H. W. Bush (1991) =

This is a list of presidential trips made by George H. W. Bush during 1991, the third year of his presidency as the 41st president of the United States. International trips are highlighted in blue.

This list excludes trips made within Washington, D.C., the U.S. federal capital in which the White House, the official residence and principal workplace of the president, is located. It also excludes the capital's immediate surroundings in Maryland and Virginia, such as Andrews Air Force Base in Maryland, where the president typically boards Air Force One for all trips outside the area. Also excluded are trips to Camp David, the country residence of the president, and to the Bush family compound in Kennebunkport, Maine.

== January ==
No trips made

== February ==
State or country	Areas visited	Dates	Details
North Carolina	Havelock, Goldsboro	February 1	Met with families of servicemembers deployed in Operation Desert Storm at Marine Corps Air Station Cherry Point and Seymour Johnson Air Force Base.
Georgia	Hinesville	February 1	Met with families of servicemembers deployed in Operation Desert Storm at Hunter Army Airfield.
Florida	Jupiter Island	February 1	Visited the home of his mother, Dorothy Wear Walker Bush.
New York	New York	February 6	Addressed the Economic Club of New York at the New York Hilton Midtown.
Massachusetts	Andover	February 15	Toured the Raytheon Missile Systems plant.

== March ==
State or country	Areas visited	Dates	Details
Canada	Ottawa	March 13–14	Met with Prime Minister Brian Mulroney. Signed an Air Quality Agreement.
France	Fort-de-France, Martinique	March 14	Discussed the Middle East peace process with President François Mitterrand.
Bermuda	Hamilton	March 14–16	Discussed the Middle East peace process with Prime Minister John Major.
South Carolina	Sumter	March 17	Welcomed servicemembers returning from Operation Desert Storm at Sumter Memorial Stadium.
Florida	Islamorada, Hobe Sound	March 31–April 3	Vacation. Visited his mother, Dorothy Wear Walker Bush.

== April ==
State or country	Areas visited	Dates	Details
California	Newport Beach, Universal City	April 4–5	Hosted Japanese prime minister Toshiki Kaifu, and spoke to Hispanic business leaders about the planned Mexico Free Trade Agreement, at the Four Seasons Hotel in Newport Beach. Attended a 50th anniversary celebration of the United Service Organizations at Universal Studios Hollywood.
Texas	Houston, Arlington	April 6–8	Stayed at The Houstonian Hotel. Attended services at St. Martin's Episcopal Church. Hosted Mexican president Carlos Salinas de Gortari at Ellington Field Joint Reserve Base. Addressed the Hispanic Alliance for Free Trade breakfast at The Houstonian Hotel. Presented the 424th Point of Light to Voice of Hope Ministries at Dallas Naval Air Station. Attended the funeral of former senator John Tower at Highland Park United Methodist Church. Threw out the ceremonial first pitch on Major League Baseball's Opening Day at Arlington Stadium (along with his son George W. Bush, managing owner of the Texas Rangers).
West Virginia	Slanesville	April 10	Presented the National Teacher of the Year Award to Rae Ellen McKee at Slanesville Elementary School.
Alabama	Montgomery	April 13	Spoke at USAF Air War College.
Maryland	Annapolis	April 23	Presented the 437th Point of Light to an education partnership between the United States Naval Academy and the Benjamin Banneker Honors Mathematics and Science Society.

== May ==
State or country	Areas visited	Dates	Details
Missouri	St. Louis	May 3	Spoke at the Cochran Gardens Community Center.
Michigan	Ann Arbor	May 4	Gave the commencement address at the University of Michigan's Michigan Stadium.
New Jersey	Princeton	May 10	Dedicated the new Social Sciences Complex at Princeton University.
Virginia	Hampton	May 12	Gave the commencement address at Hampton University's Armstrong Stadium.
Minnesota	St. Paul	May 22	Took questions from students at the Saturn School of Tomorrow.
Massachusetts	Boston	May 24	Addressed the Exports-Generating Jobs for Americans luncheon, and campaigned for Steven Pierce for Congress, at the Boston World Trade Center.
Connecticut	New Haven	May 27	Gave the commencement address at Yale University.
Colorado	Colorado Springs	May 29	Gave the commencement address at the United States Air Force Academy.

== June ==
State or country	Areas visited	Dates	Details
New York	West Point	June 1	Gave the commencement address at the United States Military Academy.
Georgia	Atlanta	June 6	Addressed the Southern Baptist Convention at the Georgia World Congress Center.
Delaware	Seaford	June 11	Spoke at the graduation of James H. Groves Adult High School.
California	Pasadena, Los Angeles, Lake Sherwood, Malibu, Beverly Hills, Fountain Valley	June 14–17	Gave the commencement address at the California Institute of Technology. Attended a Los Angeles Dodgers–St. Louis Cardinals game at Dodger Stadium. Stayed at the Four Seasons Hotel in Santa Monica. Golfed at Sherwood Country Club with former president Ronald Reagan. Visited the home of Jerry Weintraub in Malibu. Attended services at All Saints' Episcopal Church. Spoke to the Asian Pacific American community at Mile Square Regional Park. Attended a Simon Wiesenthal Center dinner at the Century Plaza Hotel.
Colorado	Grand Junction	June 17	Discussed the National Education Goals with local school board officials at the Two Rivers Convention Center. Spoke at the Mesa County Courthouse.
Wisconsin	Milwaukee	June 17	Campaigned for Senator Bob Kasten at the Milwaukee Auditorium.

== July ==
State or country	Areas visited	Dates	Details
South Dakota	Keystone	July 3	Dedicated Mount Rushmore National Memorial, 50 years after the monument was left unfinished.
Missouri	Marshfield	July 3–4	Celebrated Independence Day.
Michigan	Grand Rapids	July 4	Celebrated Independence Day.
Canada	Toronto	July 9	Informal meeting with Prime Minister Brian Mulroney, attending the 1991 Major League Baseball All-Star Game at SkyDome.
France	Rambouillet	July 14	Discussed further sanctions against Iraq with President François Mitterrand.
United Kingdom	London	July 14–18	Attended the 17th G7 summit. Also met with Soviet President Mikhail Gorbachev.
Greece	Athens, Souda Bay	July 18–20	Met with Prime Minister Konstantinos Mitsotakis. Addressed U.S. and Greek military personnel.
Turkey	Ankara, Istanbul	July 20–21	Met with President Turgut Özal.
Soviet Union	Moscow, Kiev	July 29 – August 1	Attended the U.S.-Soviet Summit Meeting. Signed the first Strategic Arms Reduction Treaty. Addressed the Supreme Soviet of the Ukrainian Soviet Socialist Republic.

== August ==
State or country	Areas visited	Dates	Details
Pennsylvania	Pittsburgh	August 14	Addressed the National Fraternal Order of Police convention at the David L. Lawrence Convention Center.

== September ==
State or country	Areas visited	Dates	Details
Maine	Lewiston	September 3	Spoke at Lewiston High School (Maine).
Pennsylvania	Philadelphia	September 12	Spoke at the Veterans Affairs Medical Center. Campaigned for former Attorney General Dick Thornburgh in the Senate special election at the Hotel Atop The Bellevue.
Arizona	Grand Canyon National Park	September 18	Signed an EPA agreement controlling air pollution from the Navajo Generating Station at the El Tovar Hotel. Hiked the South Kaibab Trail.
Utah	Salt Lake City	September 18–19	Visited Primary Children's Medical Center. Met with the leadership of the Church of Jesus Christ of Latter-Day Saints at the Church Administration Building. Stayed at the Marriott hotel.
Oregon	Portland	September 19	Campaigned for Senator Bob Packwood at the Oregon Convention Center.
California	Los Angeles	September 19–20	Visited a Metro Green Line and Century Freeway construction site. Took questions from Hispanic journalists on the detention of United Nations Special Commission inspectors in Iraq at the Four Seasons Hotel. Campaigned for Senator John Seymour at the Century Plaza Hotel.
Illinois	Chicago	September 20	Signed Proclamation 6337, declaring National Hispanic Heritage Month, and addressed the United States Hispanic Chamber of Commerce convention at the Hyatt Regency Chicago.
New York	New York	September 23–24	Addressed the opening session of the 46th United Nations General Assembly. Stayed at the Waldorf Astoria New York.
New Jersey	East Brunswick	September 24	Attended a New Jersey Legislature Republican fundraiser at the Ramada Renaissance Hotel.
Georgia	Sea Island	September 28–30	Weekend vacation, staying at The Cloister hotel.
Florida	Lake Buena Vista, Miami	September 30	Attended the unveiling of a bust of himself at The American Adventure pavilion at EPCOT Center at Walt Disney World Resort, which was celebrating its 20th anniversary. Addressed the Miami-Dade Beacon Council at the James L. Knight International Center.
Louisiana	New Orleans	September 30	Campaigned for Governor Buddy Roemer at the Sheraton New Orleans.

== October ==
State or country	Areas visited	Dates	Details
Pennsylvania	Pittsburgh	October 2	Campaigned for Dick Thornburgh for Senate at the Pittsburgh Hilton.
Kentucky	Louisville	October 2	Addressed the Crime Stoppers International conference at the Galt House Hotel. Campaigned for Representative Larry J. Hopkins for governor at the Kentucky Exposition Center.
Maryland	Ijamsville	October 13	Golfed with his daughter's boyfriend Bobby Koch at the Holly Hills Country Club.
Spain	Madrid	October 29–30	Met with Prime Minister Felipe Gonzalez Marquez and Soviet president Mikhail Gorbachev. Attended the opening session of the Madrid Conference of 1991.
Texas	Houston, Dallas	October 31–November 1	Attended a Bush-Quayle 1992 fundraiser at the Sheraton Astrodome Hotel. Stayed at The Houstonian Hotel. Voted in the 1991 Houston mayoral election at the Wilson Building. Visited the home of T. Boone Pickens in Dallas. Toured Marlow Industries headquarters, where he presented the Malcolm Baldrige National Quality Award to CEO Raymond Marlow; Attended a Thanks-Giving Foundation ceremony at Thanks-Giving Square. Attended a Bush-Quayle 1992 fundraiser at the Hyatt Regency Dallas.

== November ==
State or country	Areas visited	Dates	Details
California	Simi Valley	November 4	Attended the opening and dedication of the Ronald Reagan Presidential Library.
Italy	Rome	November 6–8	Attended the 1991 Rome NATO summit.
Vatican City	Apostolic Palace	November 8	Audience with Pope John Paul II.
Netherlands	The Hague	November 8–9	Attended the European Community summit meeting.
New York	New York	November 12	Attended a Bush-Quayle 1992 fundraiser at the New York Hilton Midtown. Met with Jewish leaders, and addressed the Asia Society, at the Waldorf Astoria.
Missouri	Kansas City, St. Louis	November 13	Addressed the National Future Farmers of America Organization convention at Municipal Auditorium. Campaigned for Senator Kit Bond at the Radisson Hotel in St. Louis and the Riverport Amphitheatre.
Ohio	Columbus	November 25	Visited the Fort Hayes Metropolitan Education Center. Addressed the Ohio 2000 Community Leaders for Education at Veterans Memorial Auditorium.

== December ==
State or country	Areas visited	Dates	Details
Florida	Bradenton	December 3	Toured the Tropicana Brands Group orange juice plant.
Mississippi	Meridian	December 3	Toured Peavey Electronics headquarters.
California	Ontario	December 6	Toured the Maglite flashlight factory. Addressed the local Kiwanis and Rotary Clubs at the Red Lion Inn.
Hawaii	Honolulu	December 6–7	Stayed at the Hilton Hawaiian Village. Commemorated the 50th anniversary of the attack on Pearl Harbor and the United States' entry into World War II at the National Cemetery of the Pacific, the USS Arizona Memorial, and the USS Missouri docked at Naval Station Pearl Harbor. Met with members of the Pearl Harbor Survivors Association.
Illinois	Chicago	December 10	Visited the Chicago Board of Trade and the Chicago Mercantile Exchange. Had lunch with local sheet metal workers at the Billy Goat Tavern. Addressed the Illinois Farm Bureau convention at the Palmer House Hotel.
Virginia	Orange	December 16	Commemorated the 200th anniversary of the United States Bill of Rights at James Madison's plantation, Montpelier.
Texas	Euless, Dallas	December 18	Signed the Intermodal Surface Transportation Efficiency Act at a construction site on Texas State Highway 360 in Euless. Addressed the American Association of State Highway and Transportation Officials convention at the Hyatt Regency DFW International Airport.
Texas	Beeville	December 27–29	Went quail hunting on William Stamps Farish III's Lazy 'F' Ranch.
