= Thanksgiving Square =

Thanksgiving Square may refer to:

- Thanksgiving Square (Belfast) a public space in Belfast in Northern Ireland
- Thanks-Giving Square a public space in Dallas in Texas
