= Beacon of Hope =

Beacon of Hope may refer to:

- A Beacon of Hope, a 1963 United States report on cultural exchange programs
- Beacon of Hope (sculpture), in Belfast, by Andy Scott
- Beacon of Hope (monument) in Stiles Circle Park, Oklahoma City
- Beacon of Hope, a sculpture in Sackville Gardens, Manchester, England
- Beacon of Hope, an album by Sea Scouts
- "Beacon of Hope" (Arrow), an episode of Arrow
