= The Dunbear =

Steel sculpture in Dunbar, Scotland

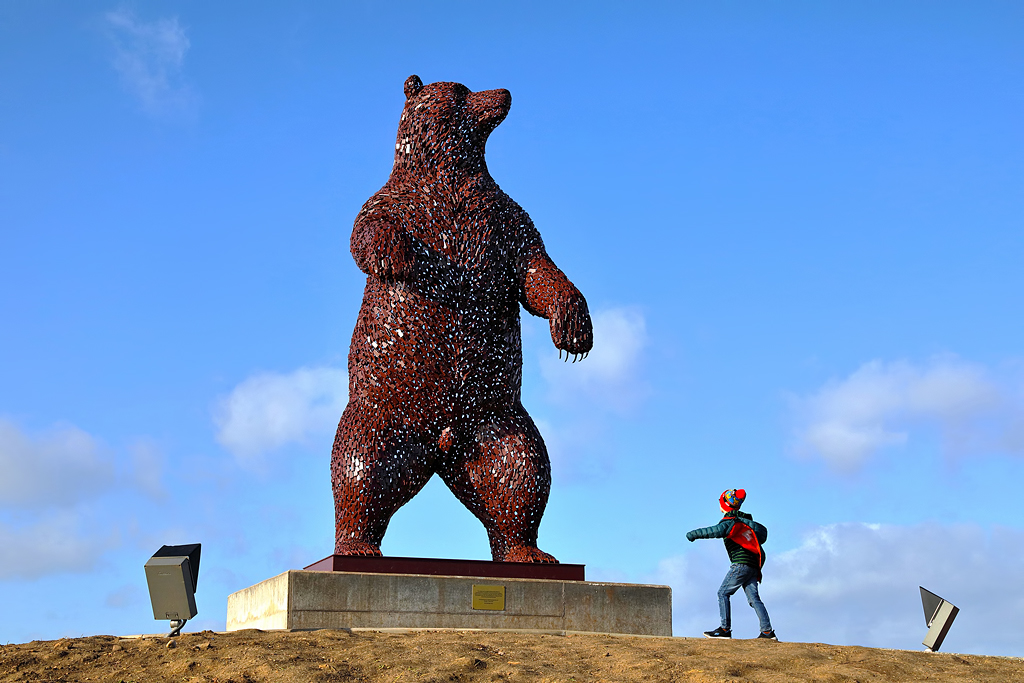
- Artist: Andy Scott
- Year: 2019
- Movement: Steel sculpture
- Subject: Brown bear
- Coordinates: 55.9883°N 2.5071°W

The Dunbear is a five-metre-high steel sculpture of a brown bear standing on its hind legs. The public artwork is located immediately adjacent to the A1 at Dunbear Par, Dunbar in East Lothian, Scotland. This proposed low carbon community is part of the Hallhill development and is being progressed by the landowner, Hallhill Developments Ltd. Erected in November 2019, The Dunbear is a tribute to John Muir, the Dunbar-born naturalist and conservationist. Muir is known as "Father of the National Parks" due to his role in the establishment of National Parks in the US, including Yosemite and Sequoia National Parks.

The brown bear sculpture was created by Andy Scott, the Scottish sculptor whose other public artworks include The Kelpies in Falkirk and the Beacon of Hope in Belfast.

== History ==
The name of the sculpture, The Dunbear, was chosen as the result of a competition involving local schools and named by a pupil at Dunbar Grammar School. It is a play on words of the town of "Dunbar" and the sculpture of a "bear".

The brown bear was chosen to symbolise the role that John Muir played in establishing National Parks in the USA. These included Yosemite and Sequoia National Parks, and through the creation of these certain species such as the brown bear have survived and thrived.

According to the sculptor, Andy Scott, The Dunbear "is a symbol of the wilderness John Muir was such a passionate advocate of and is testament to his incredible desire to protect the natural environment". He hopes it "will provide an opportunity to enlighten people about the man and his work".

Planning permission for The Dunbear was granted in October 2018 and it was erected in November 2019. It was unveiled by the sculptor, Andy Scott, children from Dunbar Primary School and local dignitaries.

The sculpture forms the centrepiece of Dunbear Park, a proposed low carbon mixed-use development, which aims to include a variety of commercial, community and residential uses. It was launched in May 2020 and is planned around The Dunbear.

Dunbear Park is part of the mixed-use Hallhill development which started on site in 1999 and is being undertaken by the landowner, Hallhill Developments Ltd. Extending to more than 400 acres, the Hallhill development has delivered more than 1,500 homes, including around 250 affordable family homes. Hallhill is also the location for Dunbar Primary School (primaries four to seven), together with playing fields; retail and food outlets; a pub/restaurant; a hotel; a community sports hub, and over 50 acres of community woodland.

In September 2025, the statue was temporarily removed from its site and put into storage.

== Structure ==
The Dunbear is five metres high and positioned on top of a mound at Dunbear Park, Hallhill, in Dunbar.

Located immediately adjacent to the A1, the site for The Dunbear was selected as it is at the primary gateway to the town and is visible from both the A1 and East Coast Main Line. Work on the sculpture commenced in 2018 and was completed in 2019.

The Dunbear is made of welded steel and fabricated from plates of various thicknesses. Heavy at the bottom and lighter towards the top, this gives the structure an inherent strength.

The sculpture is fixed to a base erected on a mound planted with wildflowers, and visitors can access it via a footpath. Illuminated by lighting powered by onsite solar panels, it is also lit up on key dates throughout the year.
