= Kelpie (disambiguation) =

A kelpie is a mythical shape-shifting spirit inhabiting lochs in Scotland.

Kelpie may also refer to:

- Australian Kelpie, a dog breed
- Kelpie (character), a Marvel Comics superhero
- Kelpie (Dungeons & Dragons), a Dungeons and Dragons monster
- The Kelpies, sculpture by Andy Scott located between the Scottish towns of Falkirk and Grangemouth
