= Beacon of Hope (sculpture) =

Sculpture by Andy Scott

Coordinates: 54°35′58.19″N 5°55′17.18″W

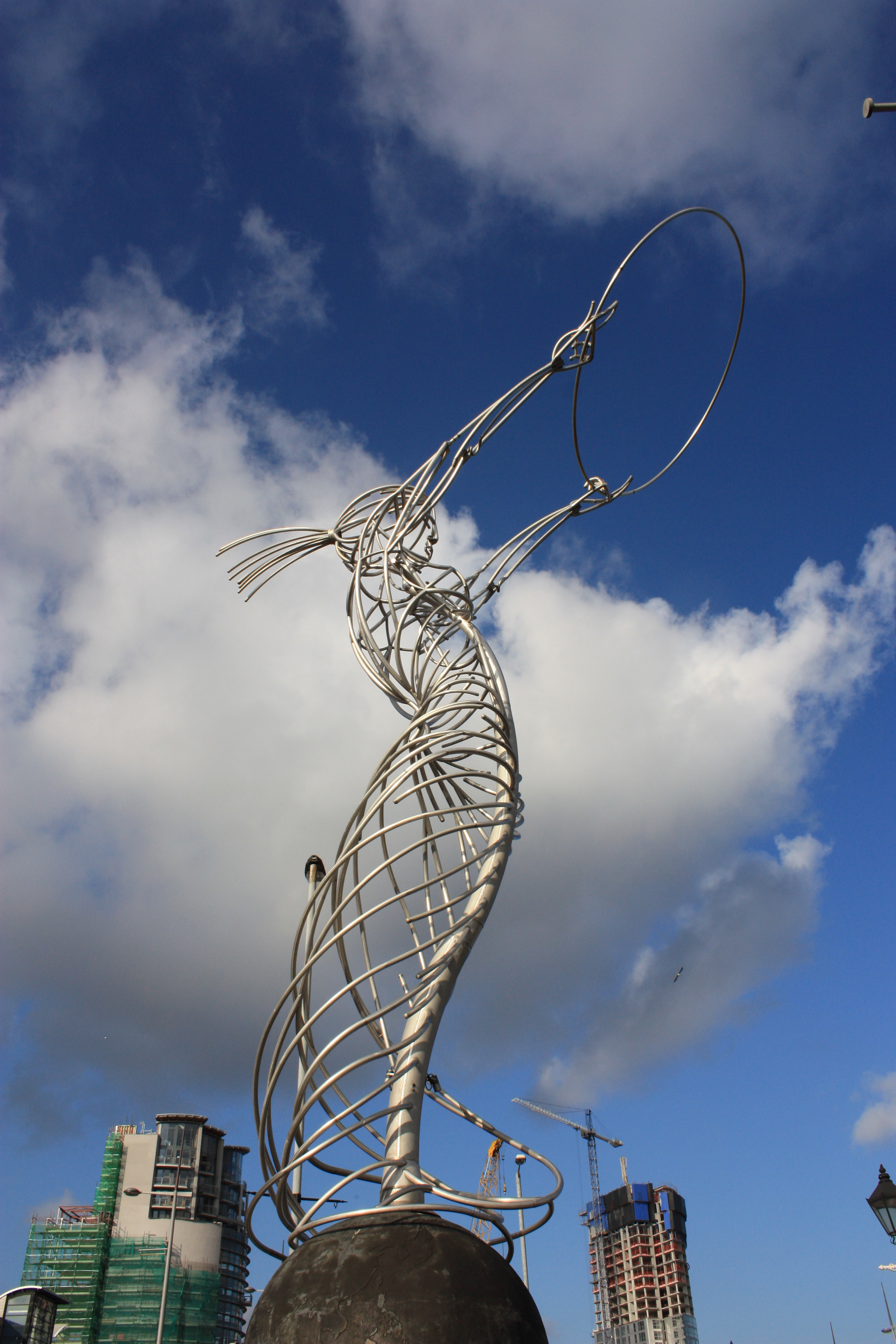
- Artist: Andy Scott
- Year: 2006
- Type: Steel
- Dimensions: 19.5 m (64 ft)
- Location: Belfast, Northern Ireland

The Beacon of Hope, Harmony of Belfast or Thanksgiving Square Beacon is a £300,000 public art metal sculpture by Andy Scott of 19.5 metres high constructed in 2007 in Thanksgiving Square in Belfast, Northern Ireland. Other nicknames for the piece include Nuala with the Hula (credited to Gerard Doyle), the Belle on the Ball, the Doll with the Ball, the Whoore with the Hoop, the Angel of Harmony, the Thing with the Ring, Our Lady of Thanksgiving and the Angel of Thanksgiving. It is currently the second largest public art sculpture in Belfast, after Rise on Broadway Roundabout.

== Construction ==
The sculpture is the result of six years of planning, development and eventual fabrication. Made of stainless steel and cast bronze, she spirals upwards and holds aloft "the ring of thanksgiving". The globe at her feet indicates the universal philosophy of peace, harmony and thanksgiving, and has marked on its surface the cities where the people and industries of Belfast migrated and exported to.

The sculpture was fabricated by local company P.F. Copeland Ltd of 9 Mallusk Drive, Newtownabbey, BT36 4GX who retain the rights to the image, worked from the original scale maquettes by Scott, with the bronze globe cast by Beltane Studios in Peebles.

As an icon for Belfast it has been adopted by Belfast City Council, tourism authorities, TV companies and several businesses as an emblem and logo; and in early October 2006 was recognised as the best artwork in the city by the Belfast Chamber of Trade and Commerce.

== Concept ==
The artwork is based on a concept proposed by Myrtle Smyth, who was inspired by Thanks-Giving Square in Dallas in Texas.

Lord Diljit Rana, Baron Rana, chairman of the Thanksgiving Square charity, said the aim of the project was to create some public space for giving thanks.

== Gallery ==
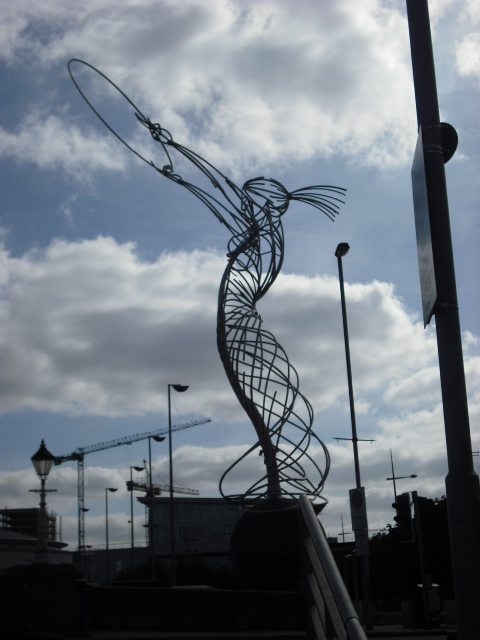
Beacon of Hope, September 2009

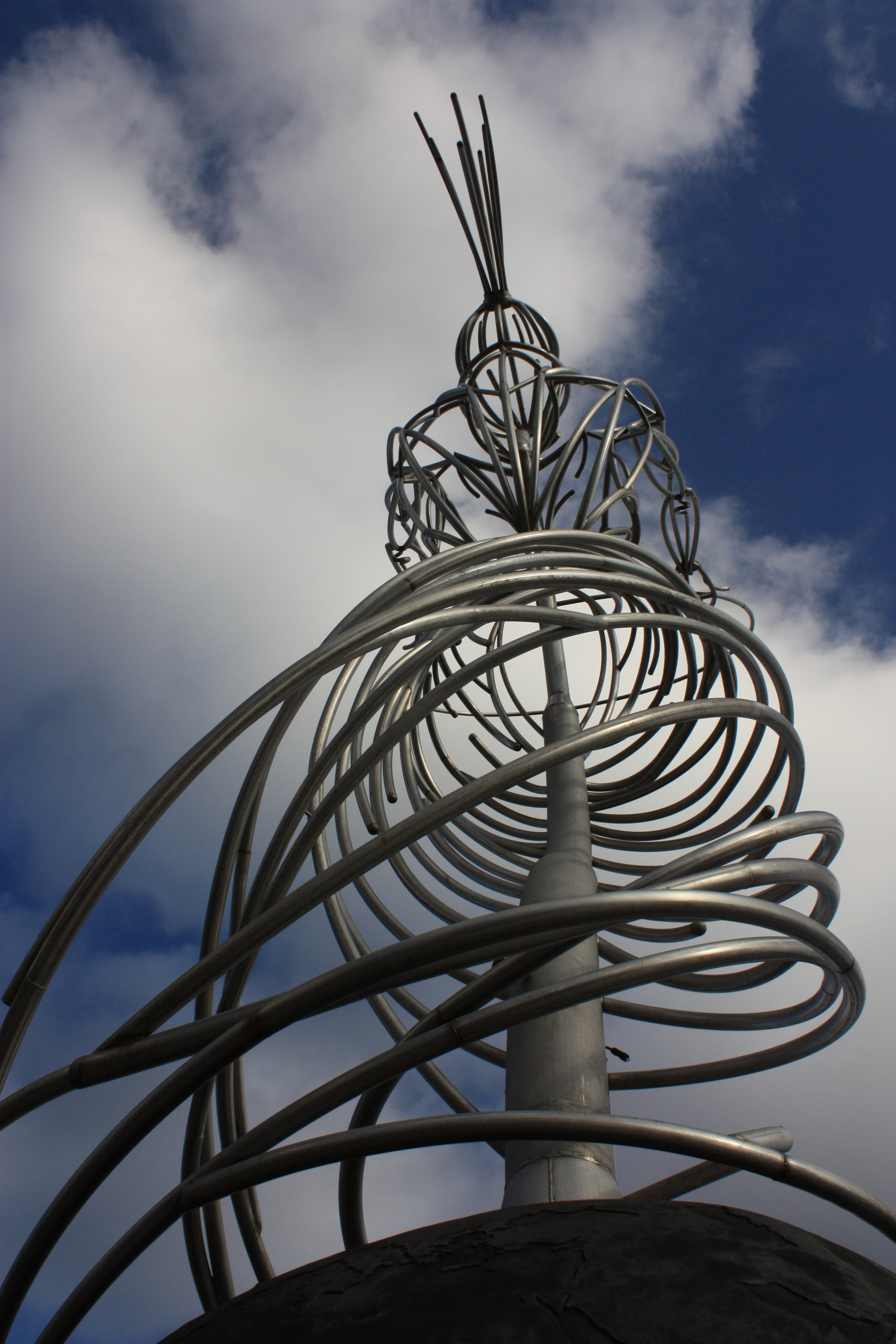
Beacon of Hope, October 2009

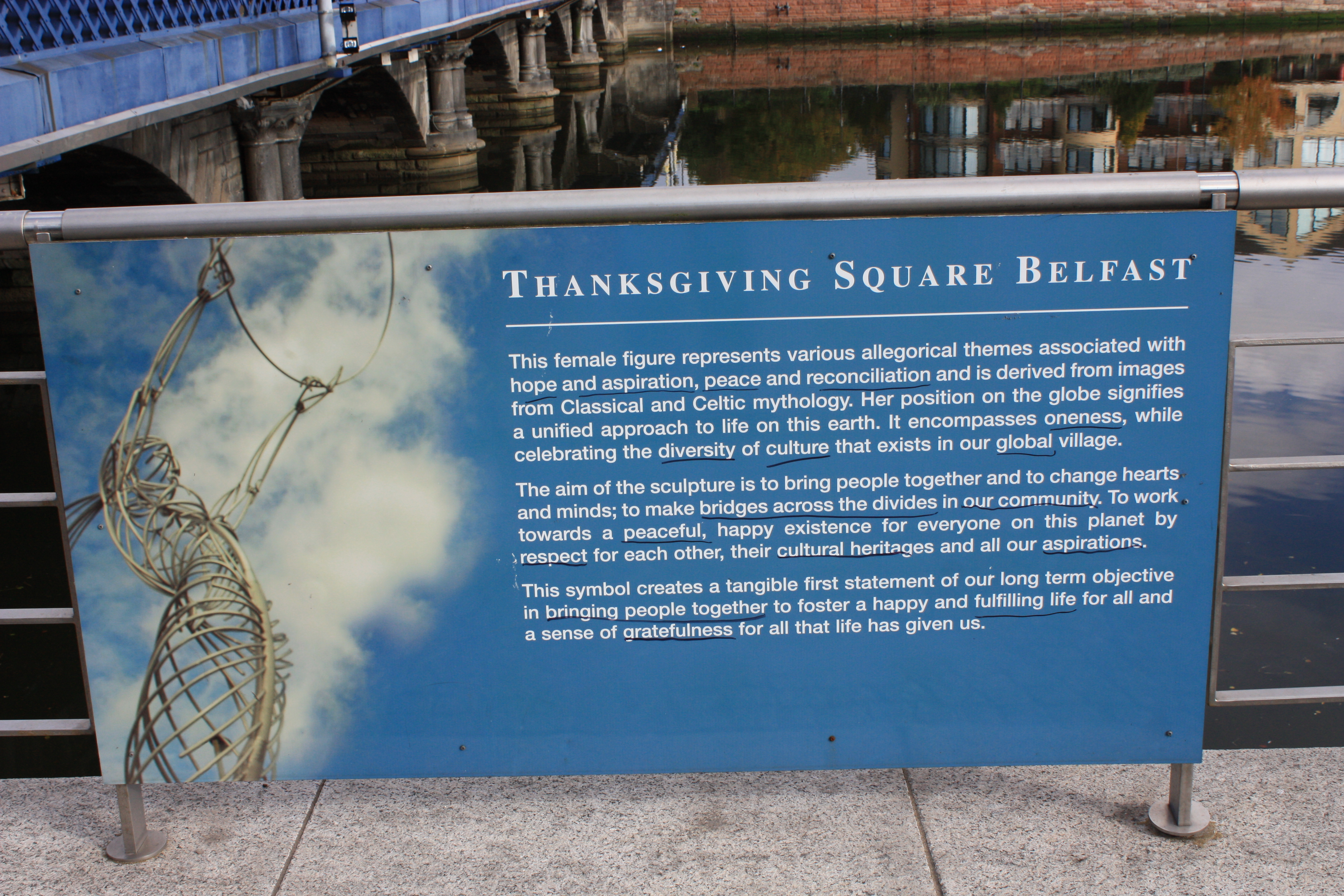
Thanksgiving Square, October 2009

== See also ==
- Beacon of Hope (disambiguation)
- List of public art in Belfast
