= Thanksgiving Square (Belfast) =

Public space in Belfast, Northern Ireland

Coordinates: 54°35′58.19″N 5°55′17.18″W

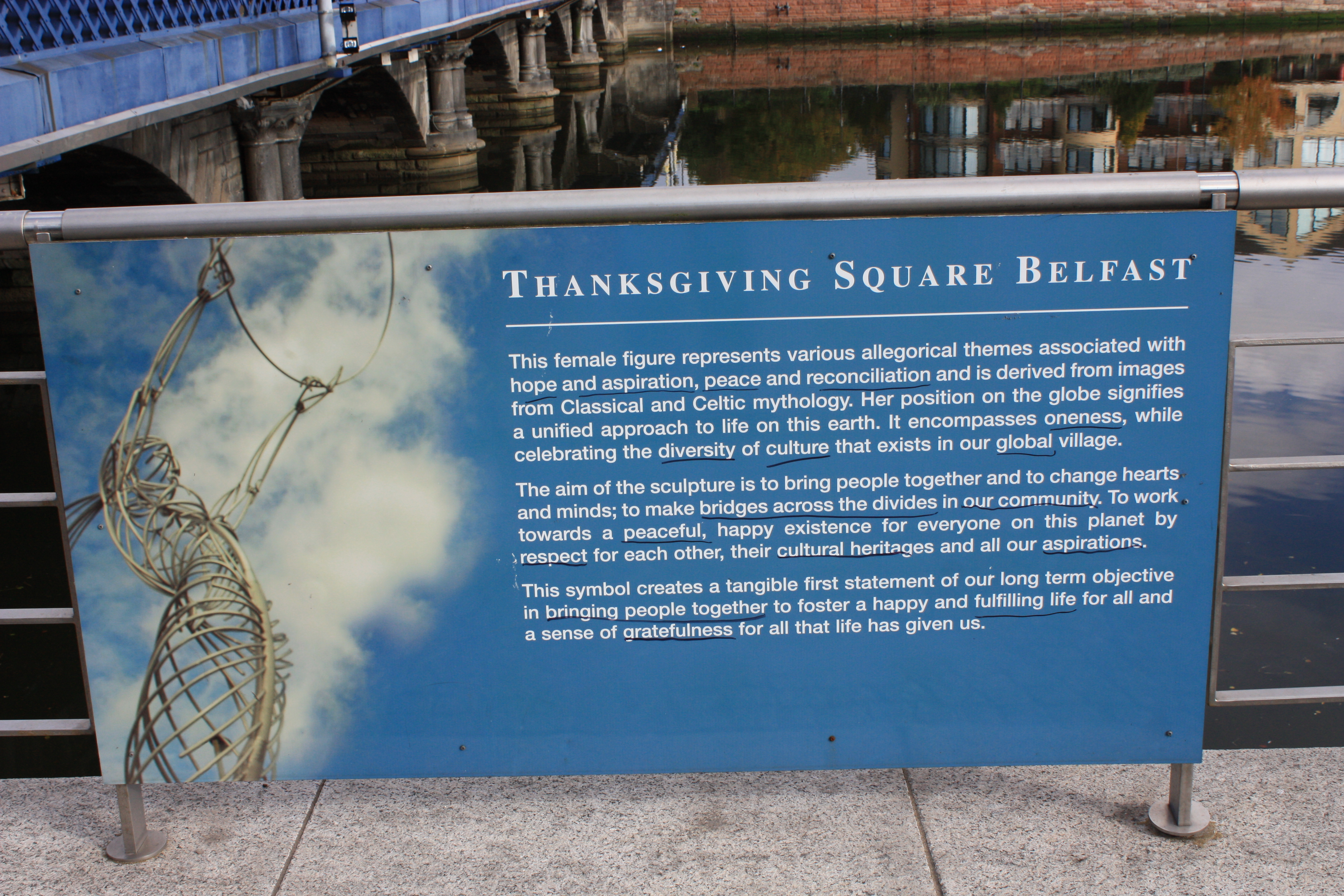
Thanksgiving Square, October 2009

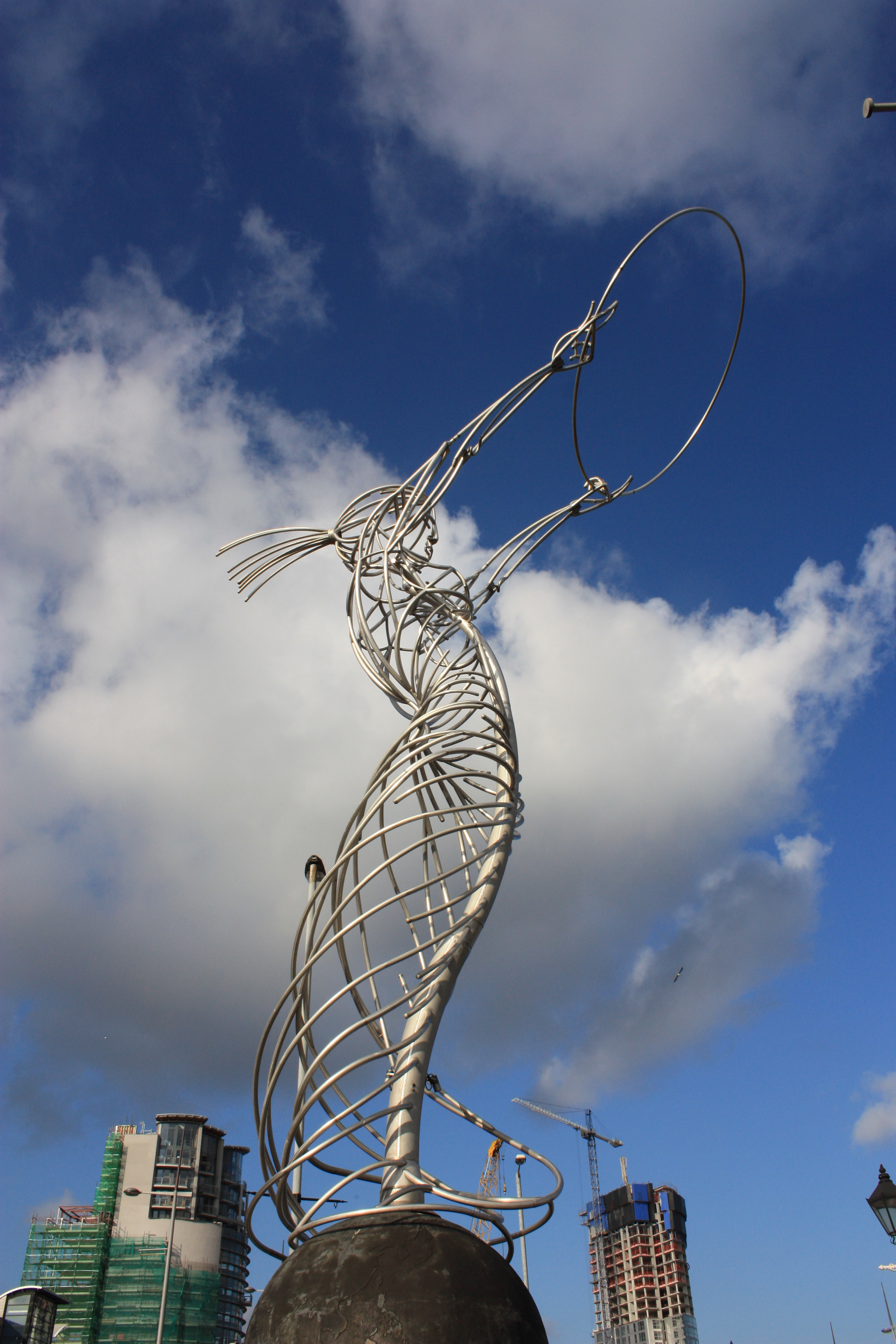
Beacon of Hope sculpture, Thanksgiving Square, October 2009

Thanksgiving Square is an area of public space in Lanyon Place in Belfast based on Thanks-Giving Square in Dallas, Texas. It contains the Beacon of Hope sculpture.

== Concept ==
The area was proposed by Myrtle Smyth, who was inspired by Thanks-Giving Square in Dallas.

Lord Diljit Rana, Baron Rana, chairman of the Thanksgiving Square charity, said the aim of the project was to create some public space for giving thanks.

== See also ==
- Beacon of Hope
- Andy Scott
- Thanks-Giving Square
