= Jay Batt =

American politician (1960–2025)

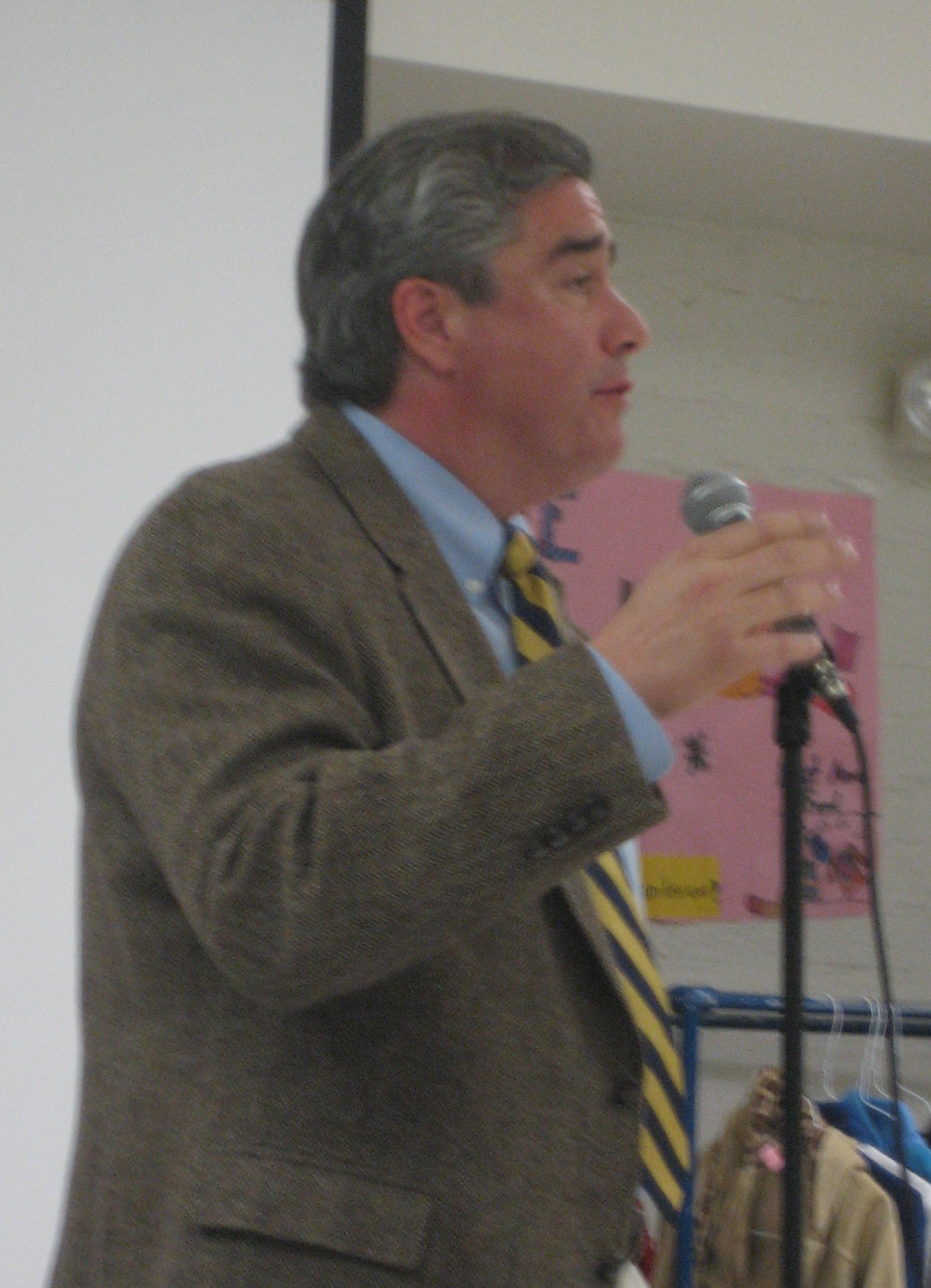
- Batt in 2010

Member of the New Orleans City Council from District A
- In office June 1, 2002 – June 1, 2006
- Preceded by: Scott Shea
- Succeeded by: Shelley S. Midura

Personal details
- Born: John August Batt, Jr. December 13, 1960 New Orleans, Louisiana, U.S.
- Died: May 19, 2025 (aged 64) New Orleans, Louisiana, U.S.
- Resting place: Metairie Cemetery
- Party: Republican
- Spouse: Andrée Wood
- Children: 2
- Relatives: Bryan Batt (brother)

John August Batt, Jr. (December 13, 1960 – May 19, 2025) was an American politician and businessman from New Orleans, Louisiana, who was married to wife Andrée Batt, and had two daughters, Bailey and Kelly. He was the older brother of actor Bryan Batt.

Batt was a fifth generation, lifelong resident of New Orleans. In his earlier years, he attended Isidore Newman School in New Orleans until 1978 and later attended and graduated from The Lawrenceville School in New Jersey in 1979. Batt attended Sewanee: The University of the South, transferred and graduated from Tulane University with a BA of English in 1984 and went on to earn an MBA of Finance from University of New Orleans in 1986. While at Tulane, Batt was a member of the Sigma Alpha Epsilon fraternity where he received the Order of the Lion Award.

As a businessman, Batt was a franchisee of Jos. A. Bank Clothier from 1992 on, as well as other businesses, such as real estate and other retail.

== Political career ==
A Republican, Batt served as the only member of his party on the New Orleans City Council, from 2002 to 2006, having represented District A.

District A runs from the Mississippi River to Lake Pontchartrain just below the Jefferson Parish line in New Orleans. It includes some of the most affluent sections of town, and some the most seriously damaged by the Levee failures of 2005 after Hurricane Katrina. The severe breach of the 17th Street Canal in the West End and Lakeview neighborhoods which was responsible for much of the flooding of the city is in District A. The largest section of District A to escape severe flooding was Carrollton.

Batt was until his death serving as Deputy Chairman of the Republican State Central Committee as well as Chairman of the Orleans Parish Republican Executive Committee. He was also elected Chairman of the Orleans Parish Board of Supervisors of Elections in 2012 (an organization in which he had been a member since 2008). Other boards and commission seats held by Batt are as follows: Board Member of the Planning and Technical Committee of the New Orleans Planning Commission from 2008-2010, President of the Sugar Bowl Committee from 2013-2014, Crimestoppers Trustee from 2004, Board Member for Beacon of Hope from 2006, and Board Member of the Delgado Foundation from 2006 until his death in 2025.

== Death ==
Batt died in his sleep on May 18, 2025, at the age of 64.

== Sources ==
- City of New Orleans
- Louisiana Secretary of State
- The Automatik
- Bloomburg Weekly
- Obituary: "John Batt Obituary - New Orleans, LA". Dignity Memorial.

Political offices
Preceded by Scott Shea (R)	Councilmember, District A 2002–2006	Succeeded by Shelley Stephenson Midura (D)
