= Caffia Coffee Group =

Scottish coffee company

Caffia Coffee Group Limited is a family-run coffee business, based in Falkirk, Scotland, United Kingdom and offers a range of professional coffee machines and coffee supplies to the workplaces and restaurants market in the UK.

== History ==
Founded as Lomond Coffee Service in November 1985, the company now known as Caffia Coffee Group underwent a re-brand and change of name in summer 2013 – the objective was to create a more modern image. A small but significant local employer, Caffia has seen good growth and supplies coffee to The Kelpies Sculptures visitor centre in Falkirk on the re-juvenated Forth and Clyde Canal.

== The brand ==
Caffia has red packaging and a range of 8 espresso coffee beans and 8 filter coffee blends; a full range of point of sale items is offered. Gracio Hot Chocolate is also a brand of Caffia Coffee Group.

== Showrooms ==
The company has two showrooms where a range of heavy-duty coffee machines can be seen – one at Falkirk head office and one in Clerkenwell, London.

== Water filters ==
The company works with WatchWater water filters using a German-made media that works differently to traditional ion-exchange media for water hardness treatment. These new products include a technology known as Nucleation Assisted Crystallization (NAC) to break down hard limescale into nano particles that do not attach to coffee machine or boiler elements, nor do they produce a potentially harmful change in water pH to being mildly acidic.
