= Bjørn Wiinblad =

Danish painter (1918–2006)

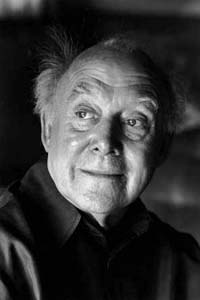
Bjørn Wiinblad photograph by Erling Mandelmann

Bjørn Wiinblad (20 September 1918 – 8 June 2006), was a Danish painter, designer and artist in ceramics, silver, bronze, textiles, and graphics. His work has been shown widely in Europe, in the United States of America first in 1954 and in Japan, Australia and Canada in 1968. Wiinblad was named Man of the Year in New York in 1985 and was awarded the American-Scandinavian Foundation’s Cultural Prize of 1995.

== Background ==
Bjørn Wiinblad was born in Copenhagen, Denmark. He attended a drawing school in Copenhagen then from 1940 to 1943 he studied painting and illustration at the Royal Danish Academy of Fine Arts.

== Commissions ==
He was attached to the United States Embassy in Paris in 1947 as a poster designer. Later his posters illustrated Copenhagen's famous Tivoli Gardens and many other activities in Denmark, as well as the Olympic Games for the Handicapped at Seoul, the New World Symphony Orchestra academy in Miami, and the Royal Danish Ballet at the Metropolitan Opera House, all in 1988. His textile work was used for costumes for numerous ballets and stage presentations.

Wiinblad illustrated the work of his fellow Dane, Hans Christian Andersen, when he took on the task of providing the artwork for "The Swineherd"(195 ) which won an award from the American Library Association. Wiinblad's "swineherd" illustrations were turned into a short animated film by Gene Deitchfor Weston Woods Studios.

=== Rosenthal Porcelain Company ===
Wiinblad was an important designer for the Rosenthal porcelain company. His most popular Rosenthal dinnerware design, Romance (Romanze), was a typical Wiinblad design in terms of its incredible level of fine decorative detail. Starting in 1971, he also designed an annual commemorative Christmas plate for Rosenthal. Wiinblad also designed ceramic pieces for Nymolle, a Danish pottery.

=== Dallas, Texas ===
In 1954 Wiinblad began collaborating with businesses and organizations in Dallas, Texas, and later operated a store in the city during the 1980s. He received commissions from the Dallas Ballet (costume and set design), Dallas Theater Center, Neiman Marcus, Thanks-Giving Square, and multiple projects for developer Trammell Crow. For the Dallas International Apparel Mart he designed five massive Scheherazade tapestries, where they were displayed from 1973 until the building was closed in 2004.

== Style ==
Characteristics of Wiinblad's work include whimsical round-faced people, dressed in vaguely 19th-century costume. They are often surrounded by natural elements: twining vines, floral wreaths, and fantastical trees. When Wiinblad employed color, he did so with great assurance. His colors are saturated and strong—sometimes almost psychedelic—and are often supplemented with metallic gold or silver.

== Gallery of Bjørn Wiinblad's works ==
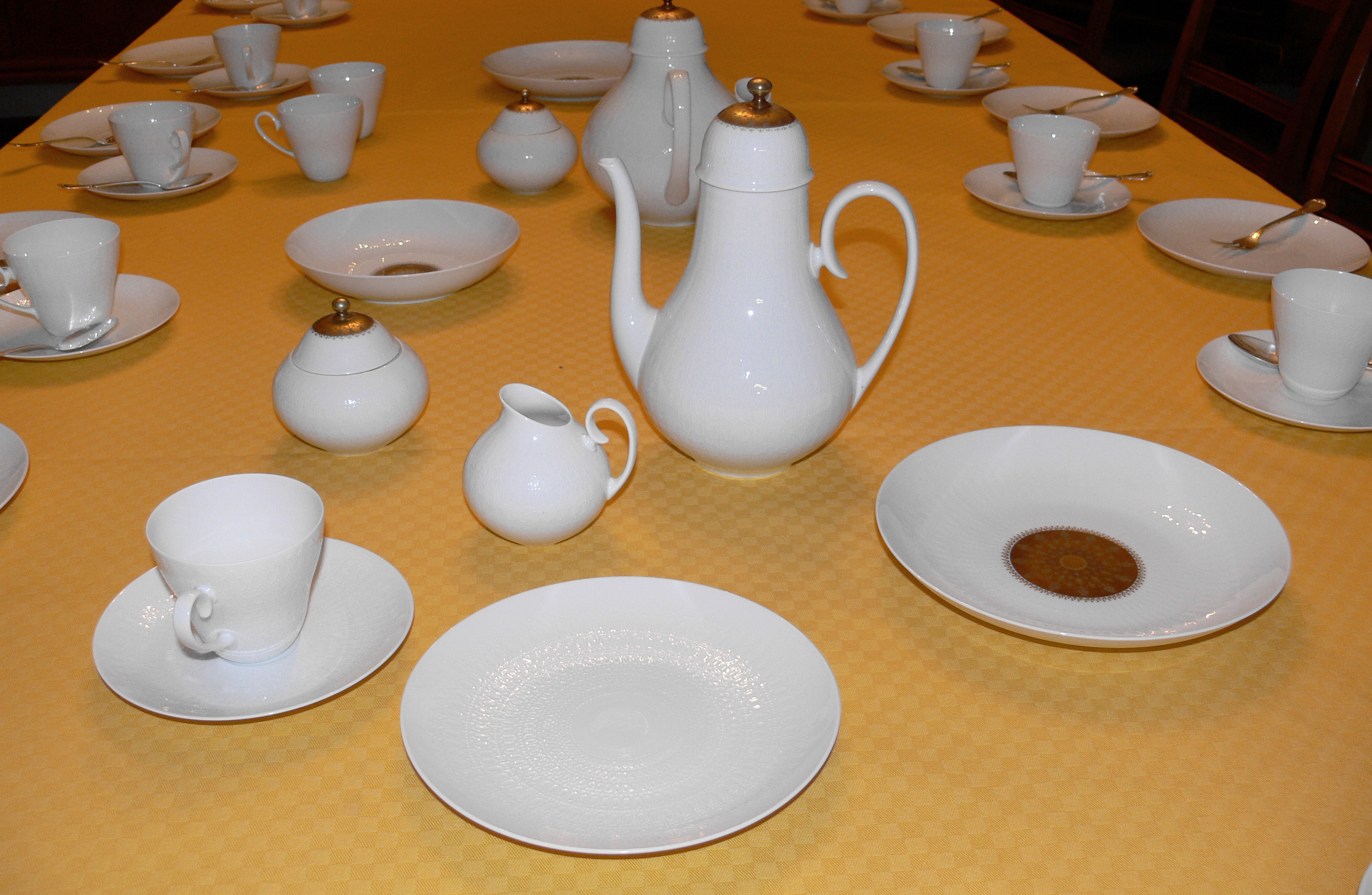
Rosenthal porcelain

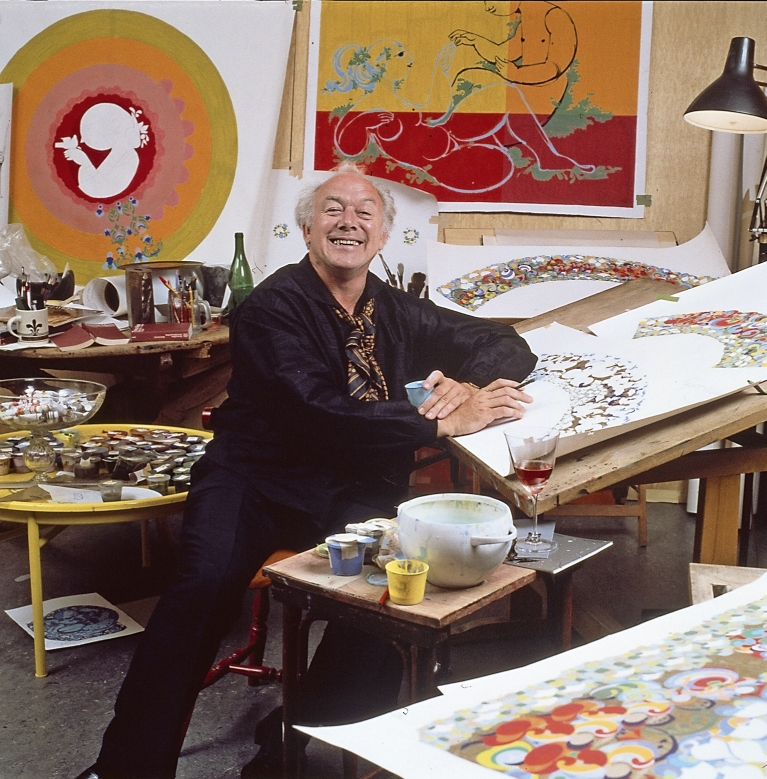
Wiinblad in his studio

== Artwork on view ==
Museums the world over have Wiinblad's work in their collections. Among these are the Victoria and Albert Museum in London; the Museum of Modern Art in New York; and Stockholm's National Museum. His large ceramics and tapestries have been used for hotel decorations in Japan and the United States.

== Literature ==
- Bjørn Wiinblad : lyst og livsværk (2012) edited by Majbritt Løland (Middelfart, CLAY Museum of Ceramic Art Denmark) ISBN 978-87-91135-38-5
- Bjørn Wiinblad (2015) edited by Camilla Jalvin, et al. (Arken Museum of Modern Art) ISBN 978-06-92777-40-4
