= Shelley Midura =

American politician (born 1966)

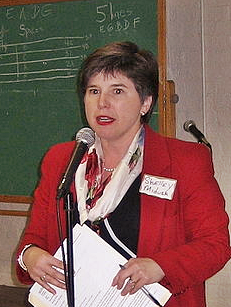

Member of the New Orleans City Council from District A
- In office June 1, 2006 – May 3, 2010
- Preceded by: Jay Batt
- Succeeded by: Susan Guidry

Personal details
- Born: January 2, 1966 (age 60) New Orleans, Louisiana
- Party: Democratic
- Spouse: Jonathan Midura
- Children: Redding (b. 1994); Justis (b. 1996); Sophie (b. 2000)
- Education: Georgetown University
- Occupation: Foreign Service Officer

Shelley Stephenson Midura (born January 2, 1966) is a resident of New Orleans, Louisiana and a former member of the New Orleans City Council. A Democrat, she represented District A from 2006 to her retirement in 2010. She first won election when she defeated Republican incumbent Jay Batt. She announced in 2009 that she would not seek reelection.

== Early life ==
Midura is a New Orleans native who grew up in the Lakeview section of the city, specifically Lakewood South. She was graduated from Isidore Newman School in 1984 and spent the next four years at Georgetown University. While enrolled in Georgetown, she spent her junior year abroad—six months in Egypt and six months in Israel. Upon graduation from Georgetown, she joined the United States Foreign Service. She married Jonathan Midura. They have three children. Upon her return to New Orleans, she helped to start the International School of Louisiana. Her father, William Monroe Stephenson Jr., is a prominent local attorney. Midura plays piano at a classical level and runs for exercise, participating in the 2004 New Orleans Mardi Gras Marathon.

== City Council ==
Midura was elected in 2006 following widespread post-Katrina dissatisfaction with incumbent Republican councilman Jay Batt, who had authorized large commercial developments in neighborhoods over the objections of neighborhood associations. Midura's election rendered New Orleans' City Council all Democrats for the first time since 1980, the previous year in which a Democrat had represented District A. In the first round of 2008 Democratic Party primary election voting, she supported fellow Council member James Carter for Louisiana's 2nd congressional district over incumbent Democrat William J. Jefferson in an election cycle ultimately won by Republican Joseph Cao.

On July 15, 2009, Midura announced she would not to seek reelection to the city council in 2010. Midura endorsed neighborhood activist and Democrat, Susan Guidry to succeed her. In addition to Guidry, others who ran to succeed Midura were Republicans Virginia Blanque and former councilman Jay Batt. Guidry defeated both of them with over 62% of the vote.

== Electoral history ==
Councilmember, District A, 2006

Threshold > 50%

First Ballot, April 22, 2006

Candidate	Affiliation	Support	Outcome
Jay Batt	Republican	10,805 (40%)	Runoff
Shelley Stephenson Midura	Democratic	7,703 (28%)	Runoff
Sal Palmisano	Republican	3,272 (12%)	Defeated
Others	n.a.	5,374 (20%)	Defeated

Second Ballot, May 20, 2006

Candidate	Affiliation	Support	Outcome
Shelley Stephenson Midura	Democratic	14,552 (52%)	Elected
Jay Batt	Republican	13,670 (48%)	Defeated

Political offices
Preceded by Jay Batt (R)	Councilmember, District A 2006–present	Succeeded by Incumbent
