= The Thanks-Giving Foundation =

American non-profit organization

The Thanks-Giving Foundation is a non-profit organization based in Dallas, Texas. It was founded in 1964 and is the chief operator of Thanks-Giving Square, providing resources so that citizens from diverse backgrounds can use thanksgiving and gratitude as ways to heal divisions and enhance mutual understanding.

== Initiatives and outreach ==
=== Interfaith dialogue ===
As an advocate of interfaith dialogue, the Thanks-Giving Foundation has organized international convocations and seminars to promote understanding, harmony, and friendship in a community of diverse faith traditions and cultures. It has hosted numerous guests at Thanks-Giving Square since 1976 including President Gerald Ford, the Dalai Lama, Rosa Parks, Arun Gandhi, President George H.W. Bush, Cardinal Francis Arinze, Martin Luther King III, W. Deen Mohammed, and Archbishop of Canterbury George Carey.

The Thanks-Giving Foundation sponsors two interfaith networks: The Interfaith Council (consisting of representatives from 26 faith denominations, covering almost every major continent of the world), and Faith Forward Dallas at Thanks-Giving Square (a broad and diverse coalition of Dallas’ faith leaders).

=== National Day of Prayer ===
In 1981, the Thanks-Giving Foundation collaborated with President Ronald Reagan and Ambassador Anne Armstrong to name the first Thursday in May the National Day of Prayer, reviving a long-dormant tradition. Confirmed by Congress in 1988, the annual event assembles civic, community, religious, government, and business leaders in a celebration of unity around prayer and gratitude inclusive of “all faiths in America.”

The organization hosts an annual National Day of Prayer luncheon or event for the larger Dallas community.

=== Center for World Thanksgiving ===
The Center for World Thanksgiving celebrates humanity’s oneness in expressing gratitude to God and is dedicated to exploring the healing and uniting power of thanksgiving. The Center has historically gathered the creations and traditions of thanksgiving from cultures of every continent to inspire individual acts and expressions of thanksgiving. It also has organized world assemblies on the topic.

== United Nations collaboration ==
As a longtime United Nations Non-Governmental Organization (NGO), the Thanks-Giving Foundation inspired the U.N. to adopt the year 2000 as the “Year of World Thanksgiving.” In 2012, the Foundation received the Spirit of the United Nations Award for Youth Outreach.
