= Beacon of Hope (monument) =

Steel columnar monument in Oklahoma City

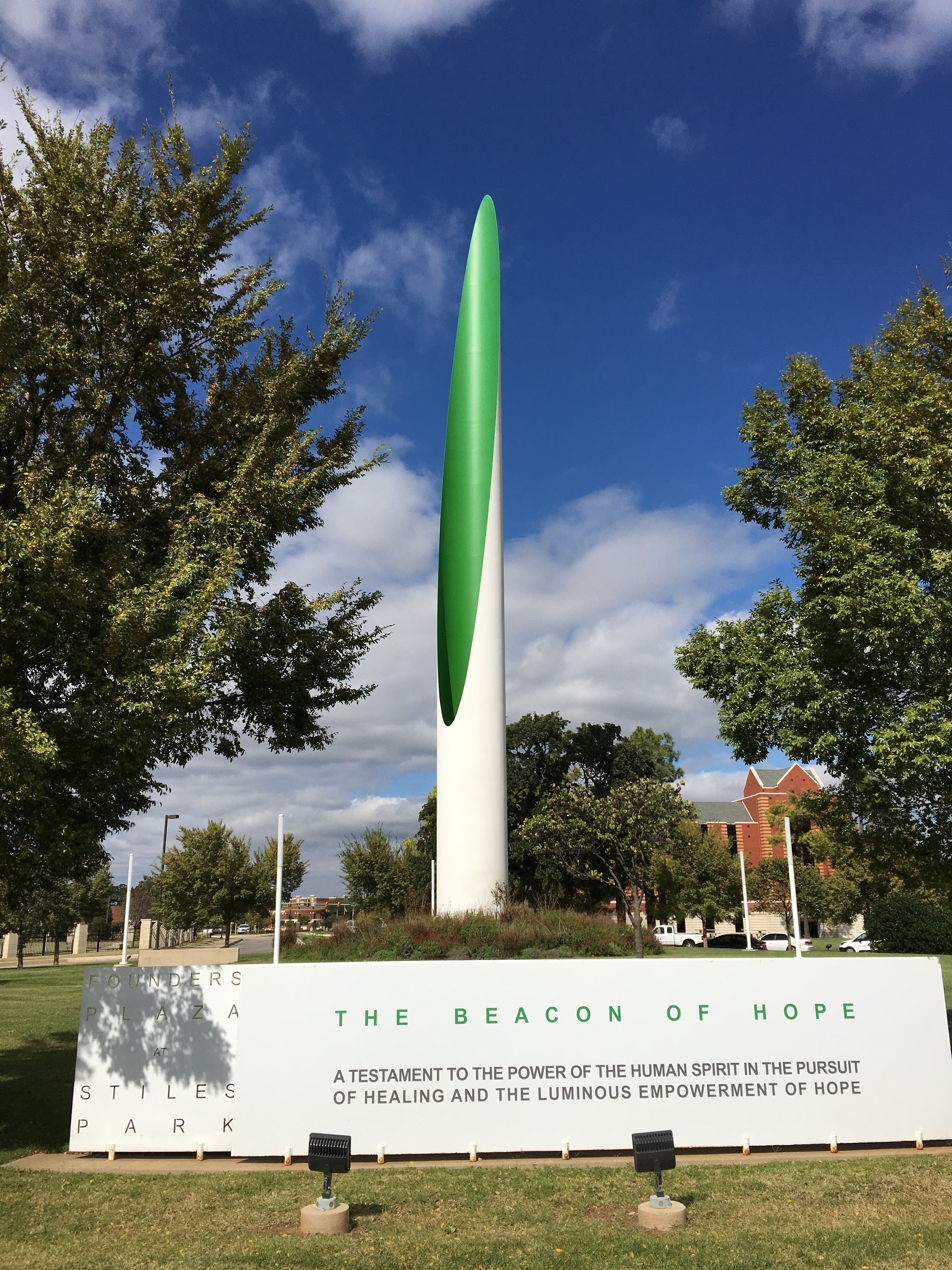
- Beacon of Hope, Stiles Park
- Interactive map of Beacon of Hope
- Location: Stiles Circle, Oklahoma City, Oklahoma, United States
- Coordinates: 35°28′33.5″N 97°30′20.9″W
- Designer: Rand Elliott
- Type: column
- Material: steel
- Width: 8 feet 0 inches (2.44 m)
- Height: 100 feet 0 inches (30.48 m)
- Beginning date: 2002
- Completion date: 2005
- Dedicated to: the founders of the Oklahoma Health Center: Harvey P. Everest, E. K. Gaylord, Dean A. McGee, Dr. Don O'Donoghue and Stanton L. Young.

The Beacon of Hope is a steel, columnar monument in the Oklahoma City Innovation District. It is located in Stiles Circle Park, near the University of Oklahoma Health Sciences Center, the Oklahoma School of Science and Mathematics, and the Oklahoma Department of Commerce headquarters. The monument is visible from Interstate 235 and downtown Oklahoma City. Stiles Park, thought to be the oldest park in Oklahoma City, was sold in 2022 to a city developer as part of the new Convergence Campus development. It is currently under construction and set to reopen in January 2025.

A shaft of green or white light can project directly up into the sky from the monument. The beam strength is purported to be 1 billion candle power, with the ability to extend up to 5,498 feet; however that claim has been questioned. The light symbolizes the healing nature of the nearby health center.
