= Marlow Industries =

Texas manufacturing company

II-VI Marlow (formerly Marlow Industries Incorporated)
- Type: Public, Division of II-VI Incorporated
- Founded: 1973
- Founder: Raymond Marlow
- Headquarters: Dallas, United States
- Products: Thermoelectric Cooling
- Website: www.ii-vi.com

II-VI Marlow is a division of II-VI Incorporated. Based in Dallas, Texas, II-VI Marlow designs and manufactures thermoelectric modules and systems.

== History ==
Marlow Industries Incorporated was founded by Raymond Marlow in 1973. It was focused on thermoelectric cooling technology, value-added systems for the aerospace, defense, medical, industrial, automotive, power and defense sectors.

In 1991, Marlow Industries Incorporated received the Malcolm Baldrige National Quality Award, an award created by the U.S. Congress and presented by the President. Marlow Industries was recognized for its work in improving the company through deployment of a Total Quality Management system.

In 2004, the company was acquired by II-VI Incorporated. Marlow Industries Incorporated became a subsidiary of II-VI Incorporated and began operating within II-VI's Compound Semiconductors Group.

The company opened its first offshore manufacturing facility in Ho Chi Minh City, Vietnam, in 2005. The factory's initial focus was on thermoelectric module assembly lines for standard commercial products. The factory now includes various component and system assembly lines, as well as an engineering design center.

To expand opportunities in the thermoelectric industry, Marlow Industries Incorporated acquired an equity stake in Fuxin Electronics, a company located in Guangdong Province, China, in 2007.

In 2014, Marlow Industries Incorporated became a division of II-VI Incorporated, and is now known as II-VI Marlow.

== Technology ==
II-VI Marlow designs and manufactures semiconductor-based thermoelectric coolers and subsystems, which provide cooling, heating, temperature stabilization, power generation, and energy harvesting functions. Its products are used for infrared sensors, fibre-optic guidance systems, thermal reference sources, refrigerators, and chillers.

II-VI Marlow thermoelectric materials and devices have been used by the Defense Advanced Research Projects Agency (DARPA) to enable the Department of Defense (DOD) thermal management systems to operate at lower temperatures with higher performance and longer lifetime.
