= Andy Scott (sculptor) =

Scottish sculptor

Andy Scott OBE
- Education: Glasgow School of Art
- Known for: Sculpture
- Notable work: Beacon of Hope; The Kelpies
- Website: www.andyscottsculptor.com

Andrew James Scott OBE is a Scottish figurative sculptor, known for his large-scale public artworks of galvanised steel and bronze. His sculptures often feature horses and human figures and are celebrated for combining traditional draftsmanship with modern fabrication techniques.

Scott is best known for creating The Kelpies, a pair of 30-metre-tall horse-head sculptures located in Falkirk, Scotland, which are considered the largest equine sculptures in the world.

Scott has created over 90 public and private artworks in Scotland and internationally. He is currently based in Los Angeles, California.

== Early life and education ==
Andy Scott was born in Glasgow, Scotland. He graduated from Glasgow School of Art in 1986 with a Bachelor of Arts (with honours) in Fine Art Sculpture, and in 1987 with a diploma in Postgraduate Studies.

Scott's early exposure to engineering through his father, a draughtsman, and creative influence from his mother, a nursing assistant, helped shape his distinctive artistic style.

Scott has been awarded several honorary doctorate degrees from University of Strathclyde (2014), Glasgow Caledonian University (2015), University of Edinburgh Royal School of Veterinary Studies (2016) and Open University Scotland (2017).

== Career ==
Scott began his sculptural career in Glasgow, establishing his first studio in Dennistoun, before moving to larger facilities in Maryhill and later working internationally in Australia and the United States.

His work is recognised for its unique technique of constructing large-scale welded steel figures from thousands of hand-cut pieces of steel. His sculptures range from 3 to 30 meters (10 to 100 feet) in height and are typically commissioned for public, corporate, or civic spaces.

== Notable works ==
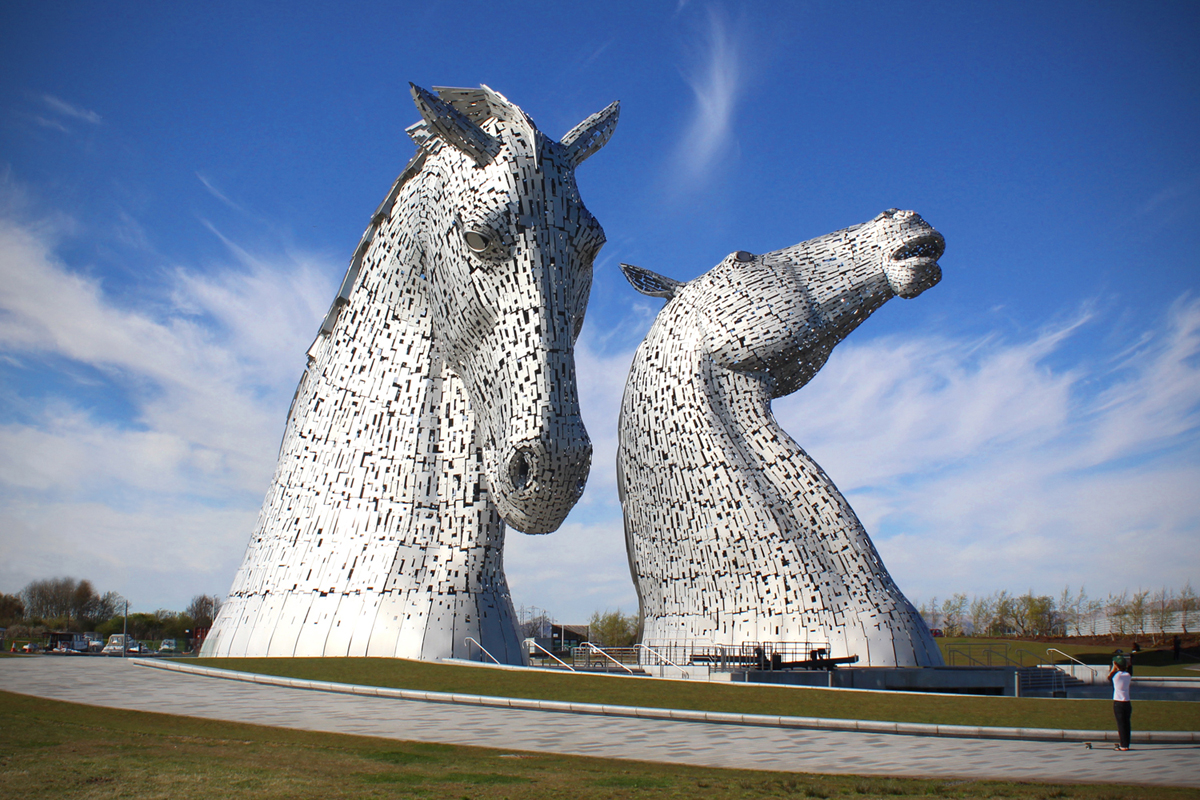
Andy Scott is well known for The Kelpies.

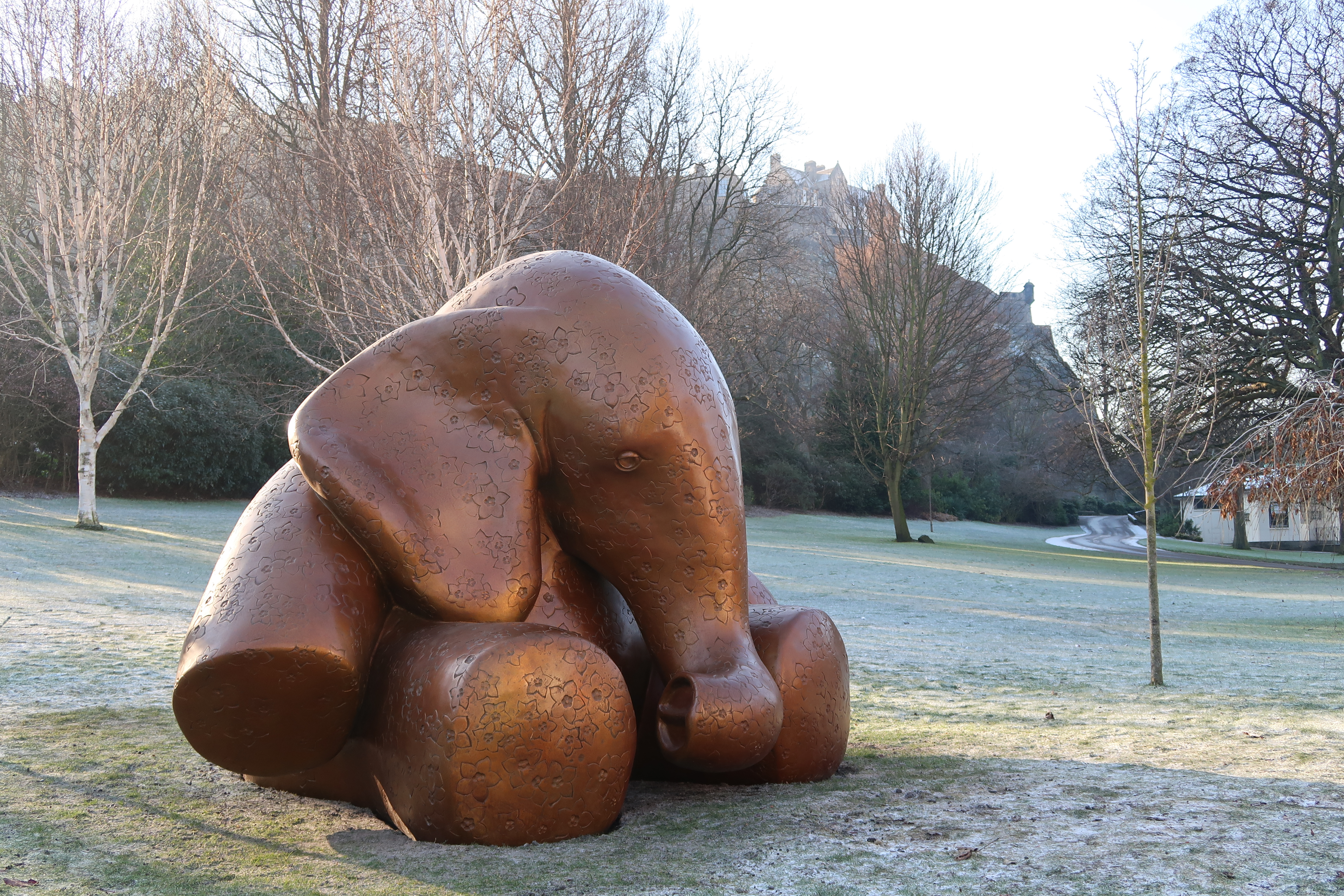
"Lulla-Bye" in Princes Street Gardens, Edinburgh, UK

- The Kelpies, monumental horses heads completed on 27 November 2013 Falkirk, Scotland
- Lulla-Bye, Edinburgh, Scotland
- Arria, Cumbernauld, Scotland
- Poised, Marischal Square, Aberdeen
- Rise, Glasgow Harbour, Scotland
- COB, Bexley, London
- Arabesque, Queensland, Australia
- Argestes Aqua, Victoria, Australia
- River Spirit, Stride, Foxboy, I Can See For Miles, Journeys End, Lifeline: all Clackmannanshire, Scotland
- Beacon of Hope, Belfast, Northern Ireland
- Ibrox Disaster Memorial, Glasgow, Scotland
- Heavy Horse, on M8 Edinburgh to Glasgow motorway
- Equus Altüs and The Briggate Minerva, Trinity Leeds shopping centre, Leeds, England
- Charles Rennie Mackintosh, Glasgow, statue unveiled on the 90th anniversary of his death on 10 December 2018.
- The Dunbear, Dunbear Park, in Dunbar, statue unveiled on 2019 in honour of Dunbar-born naturalist John Muir.
- Statues of Vincent Kompany, David Silva, and Sergio Agüero, City of Manchester Stadium, Manchester
- The Calling, St. Paul, Minnesota, USA

== Gallery ==
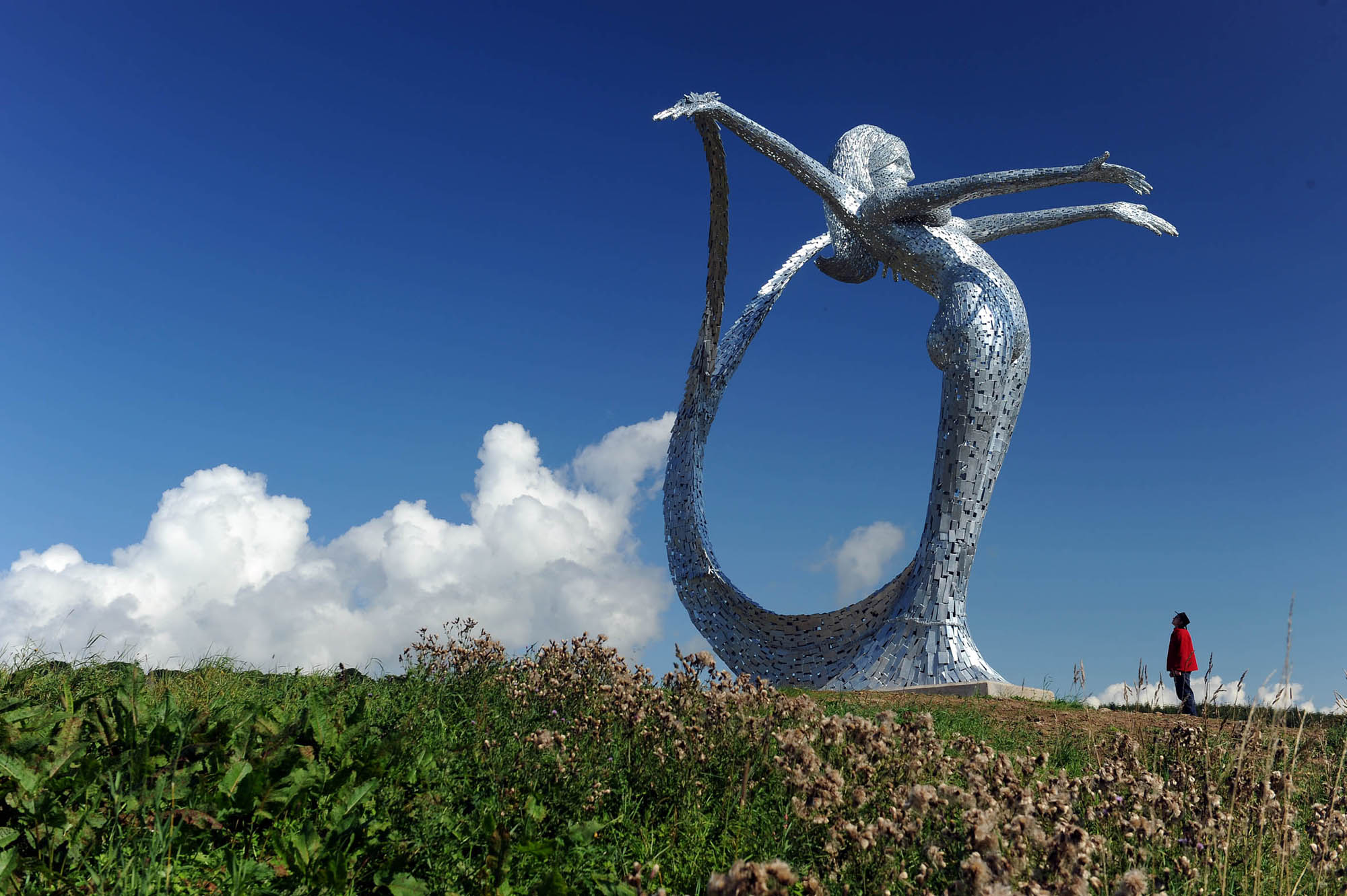
Arria, Cumbernauld, Scotland

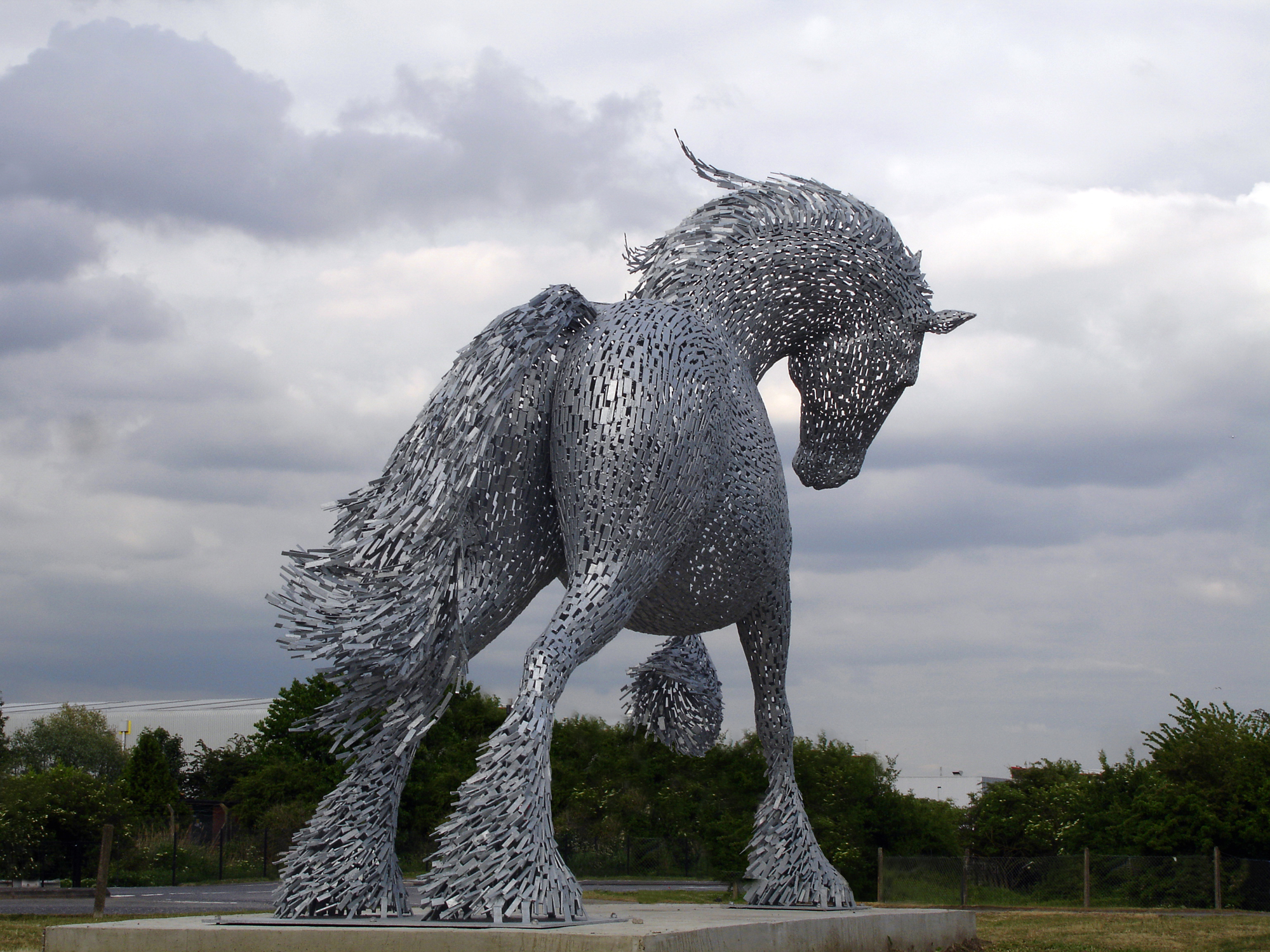
COB, Bexley, London

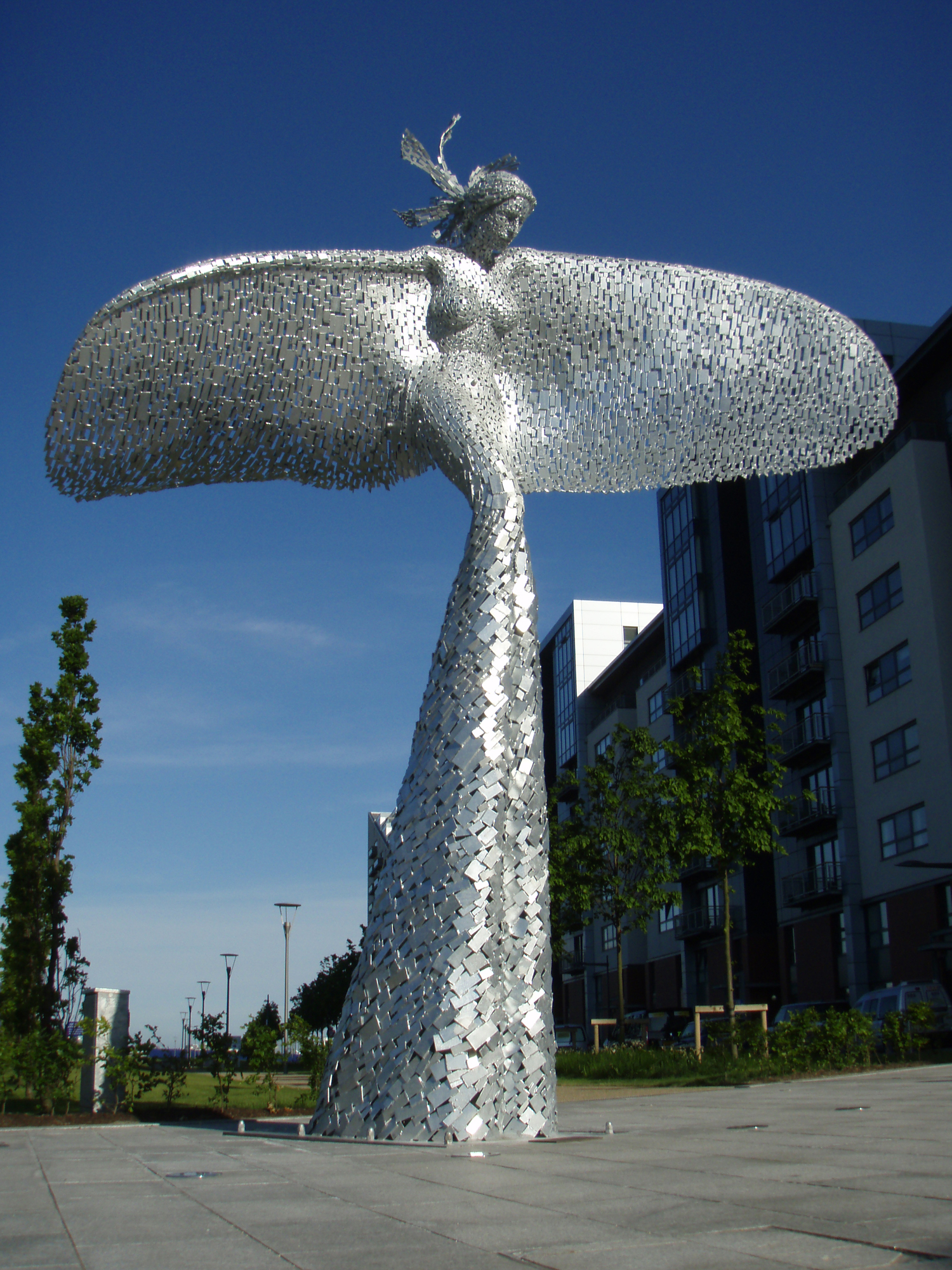
Rise, Glasgow Harbour, Glasgow, Scotland

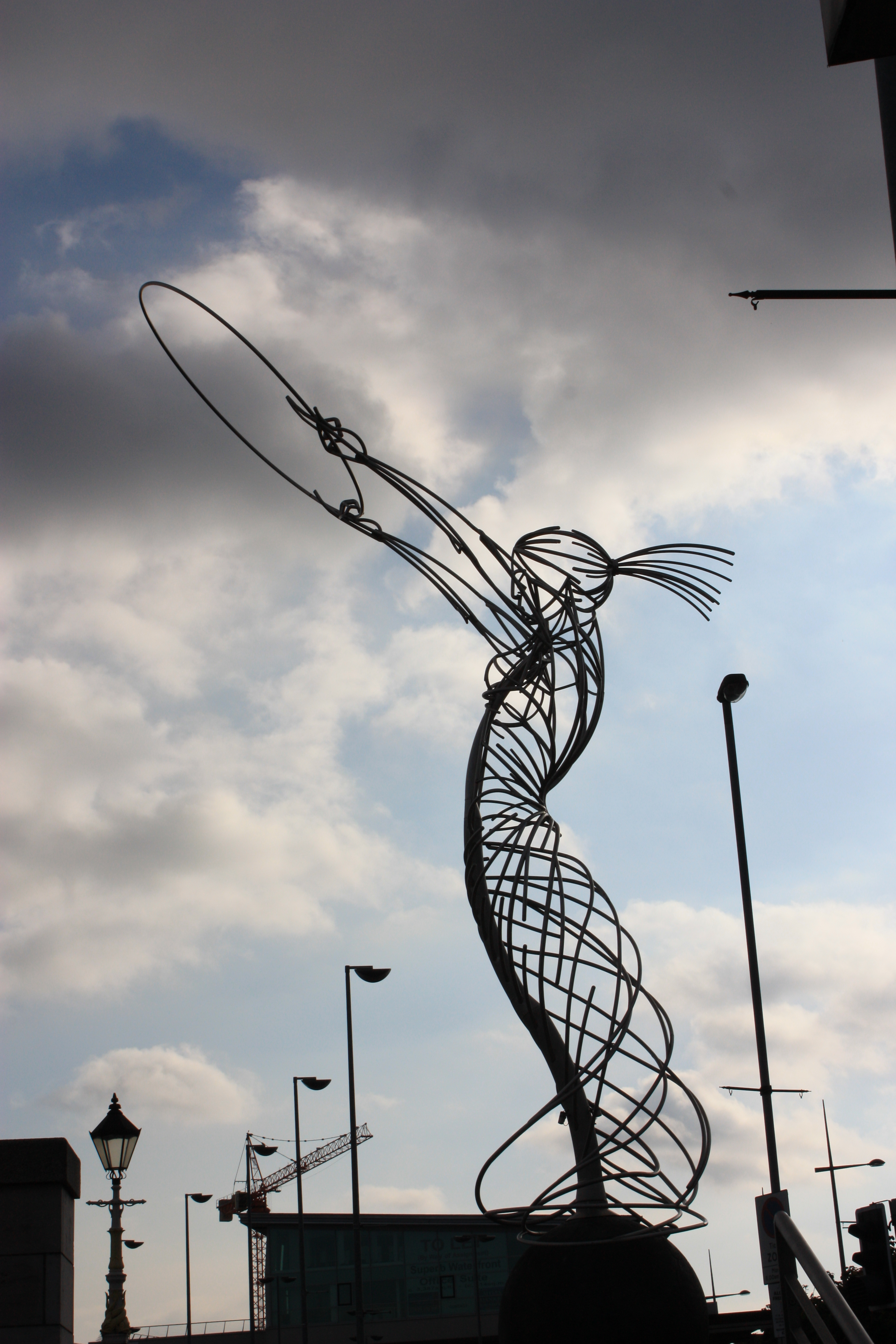
Thanksgiving Square Beacon, Belfast, Northern Ireland

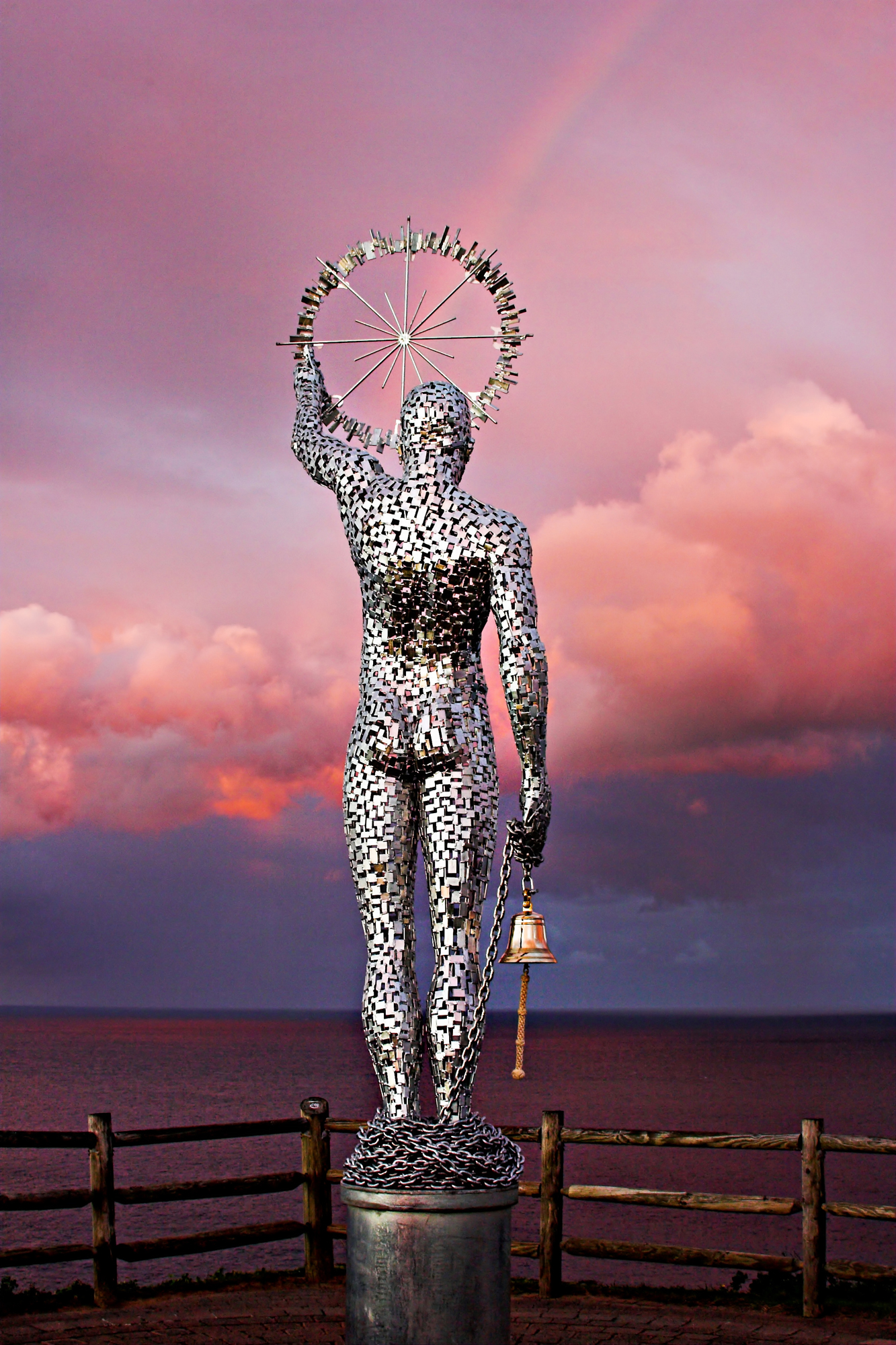
Argestes Aqua, Byron Bay, Australia

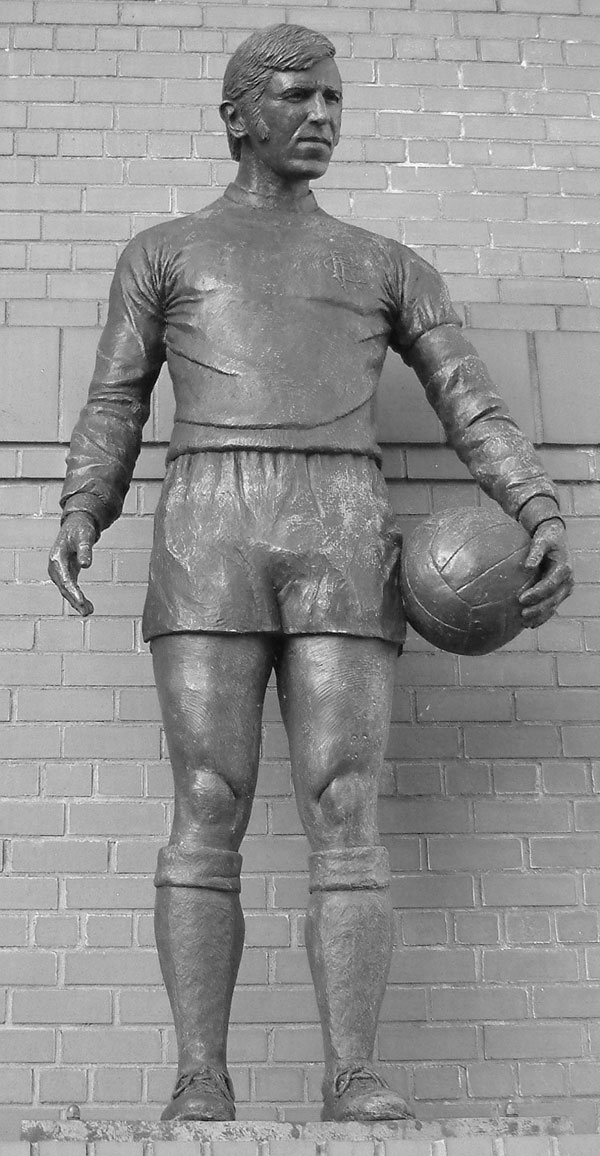
Ibrox Disaster Memorial (John Greig), memorial to the 1971 Ibrox disaster, Glasgow, Scotland

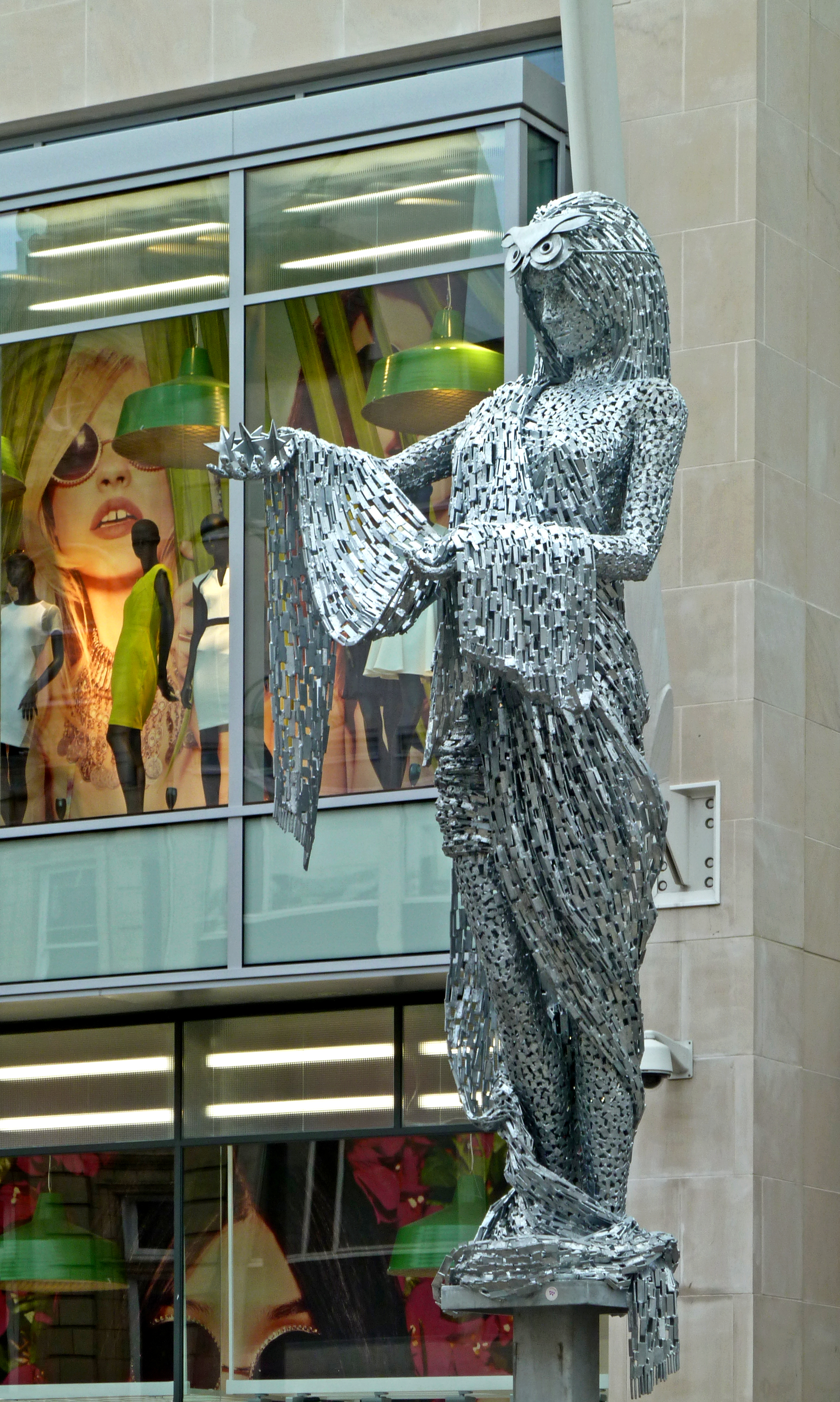
The Briggate Minerva, Briggate, Leeds, England, outside the Trinity Leeds centre

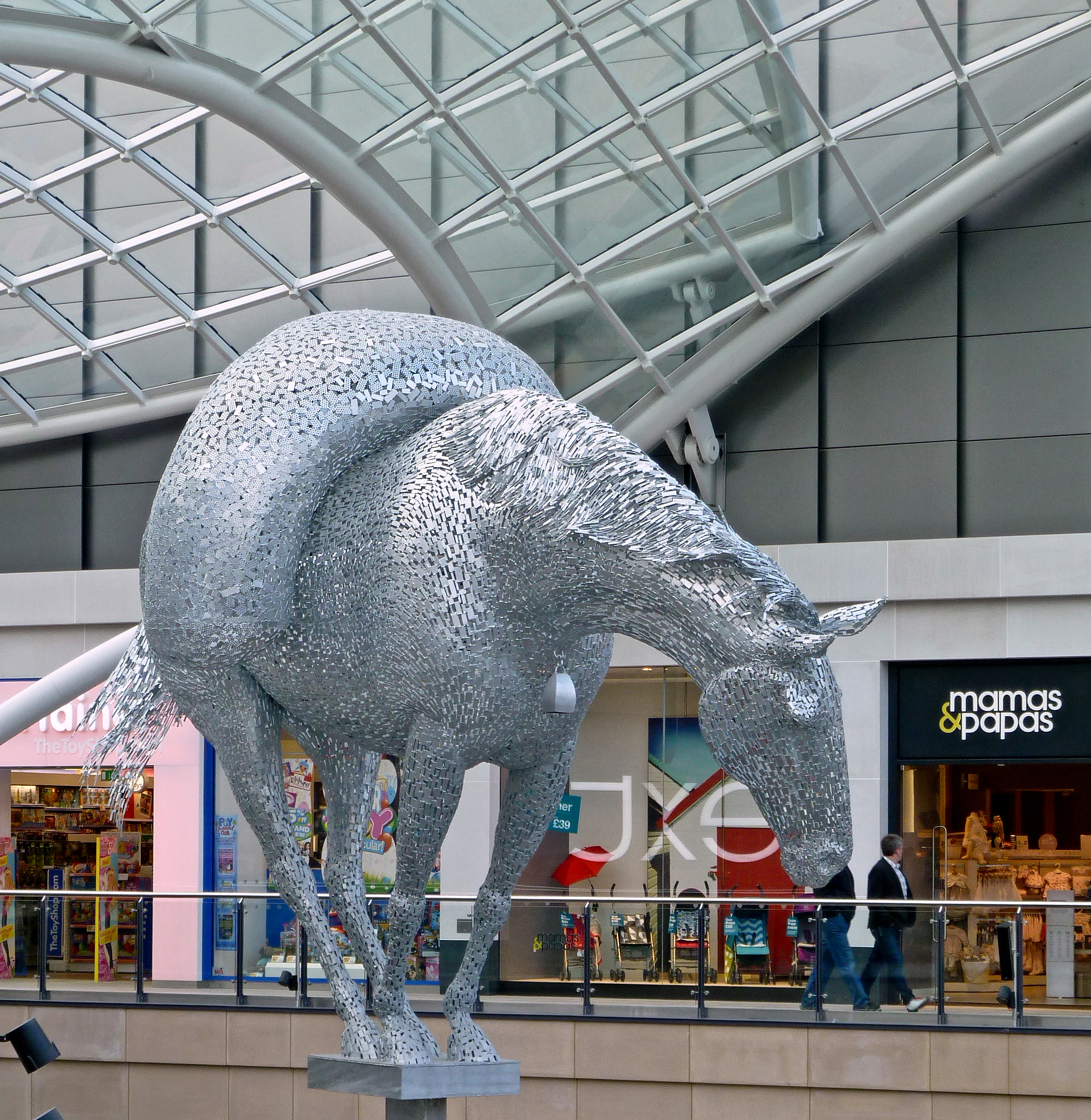
Equus Altus, inside Trinity Leeds, Leeds, England

== See also ==
- Water-horse
- The Helix (Falkirk)
- List of sculptors
