= A Beacon of Hope =

1963 U.S. government report

A Beacon of Hope is a report issued by the United States Advisory Commission on International Educational and Cultural Affairs in 1963 on the Cold War exchange programs of the United States that brought foreign artists, educators and students to the United States, and sent American artists, educators and students overseas.

== See also ==
- Fulbright–Hays Act of 1961
