= Diljit Rana, Baron Rana =

British businessman (born 1938)

The Right Honourable The Lord Rana OBE
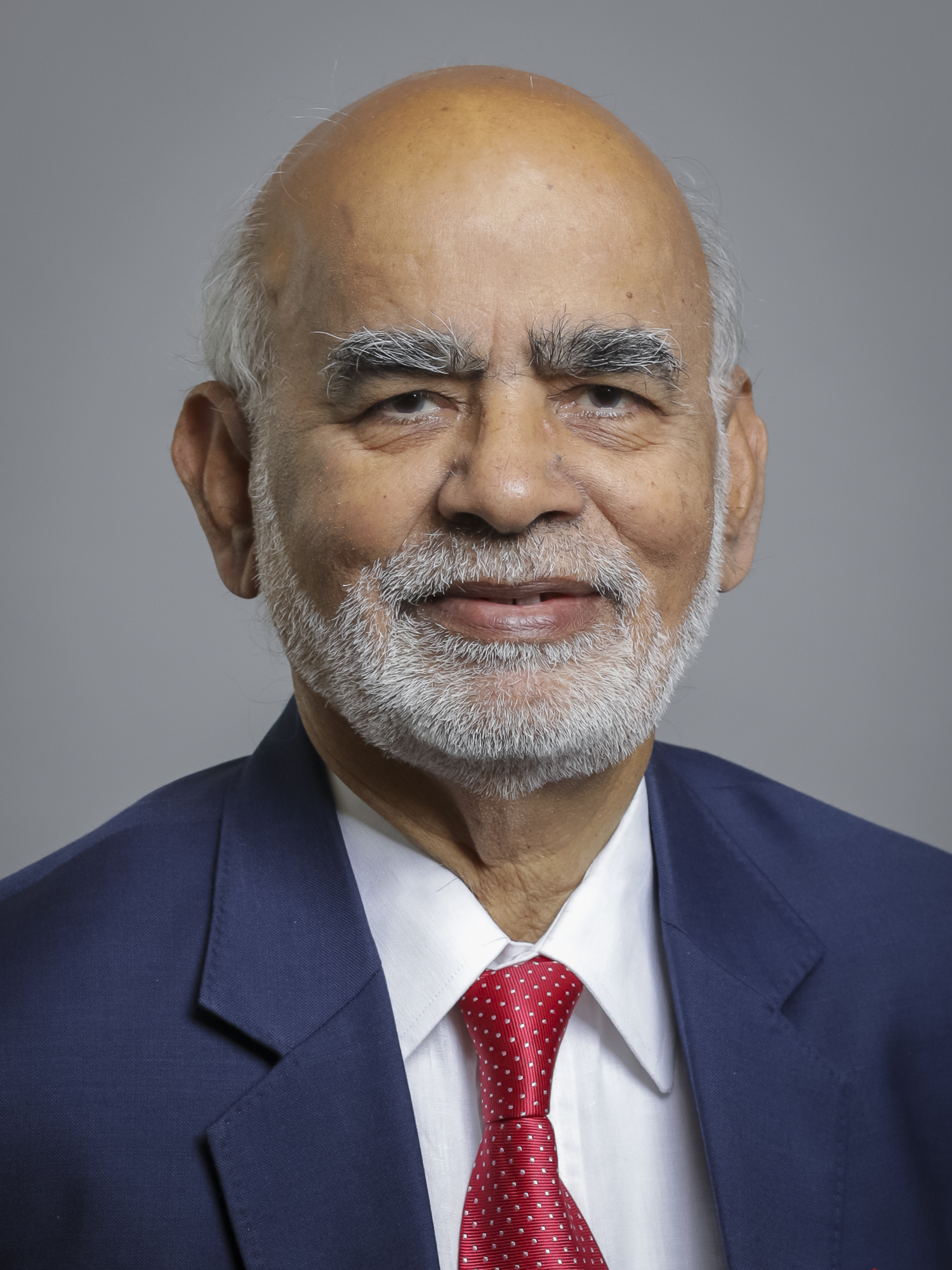
- Rana in 2020

Member of the House of Lords
- Lord Temporal
- Life peerage 16 June 2004 – 2 July 2024

Personal details
- Born: 20 September 1938 (age 87) Sanghol, India
- Party: Conservative (since 2016)
- Other political affiliations: Crossbench (2004–2016)

Diljit Singh Rana, Baron Rana, OBE (born 20 September 1938), is a British businessman and a former member of the House of Lords. Having originally been a crossbencher, he took the Conservative whip in 2016. He was married to Shruti, Lady Rana.

On 16 June 2004, he was created a life peer as Baron Rana, of Malone in the County of Antrim.

== Life ==
He was born in Sanghol, India and is the oldest sibling of three brothers and two sisters.

Lord Rana left Punjab in 1963 for England, but now has been a resident of Belfast since 1966. He had to repair his property portfolio over 25 times during the Troubles in Northern Ireland because of bombings and arson attacks. "Being an Indian I should not have had any loyalty to Northern Ireland; I stayed there despite the problem," said Lord Rana. Today, he is a successful property developer, hotelier and president of the Northern Ireland Chamber of Commerce and Industry.

He is founder and director of Andras House, regarded as Northern Ireland's leading hotel chain, owning the franchises for Crowne Plaza, Hampton by Hilton, Holiday Inn, Holiday Inn Express and Ibis as well as operating their own branded businesses. He is a leading figure in the Indian community in Northern Ireland. He is India's honorary consul in Belfast.

Lord Rana claims to promote business links between India and Northern Ireland and has been elected president of the Northern Ireland Chamber of Commerce. He led a trade mission of 13 companies to India to explore business opportunities for Northern Ireland companies.

== Honours, awards and philanthropy ==
Rana was appointed Member of the Order of the British Empire (MBE) in the 1996 Birthday Honours, for his contribution to the economic regeneration of the city of Belfast. Rana has set up a charitable trust of Rs. 50 million for a school and a college named Taxila, in his native village Sanghol, near Chandigarh, India. The new college has collaborative links with the University of Ulster in Northern Ireland. The university conferred an honorary doctorate on Rana who led a delegation of academics from the university to India to explore educational partnerships and help develop university links between India and Northern Ireland.

Rana also received an Honorary Doctorate from Bengal Engineering and Science University in West Bengal in November 2008.

He is the founder of the Lord Rana Foundation Charitable Trust UK, which has developed a university campus in Punjab offering courses in arts, humanities, IT, business, management and hospitality.

He was appointed Officer of the Order of the British Empire (OBE) in the 2021 New Year Honours for services to business and the economy in Northern Ireland.

== Disputes ==
A dispute has continued for many years over the redevelopment plans of the Tillie & Henderson factory site in Derry, this site is owned by Dijit Rana. The site was previously a shirt factory of historic importance but was damaged in multiple arson attacks including major ones in 2001, and 2002, and was subsequently demolished without permission in 2003. A budget hotel originally envisioned for the site was still at the planning stage in 2009. Rana stated in April 2009 that his designers "we're trying to get things right this time", and communication was ongoing with the Northern Ireland Environment Agency, and he hoped that "there will be a general welcome for our plans in what is a prime location in the city".

Rana was forced to comply with an Urgent Works Notice in 2003 from the Department of the Environment. It obliged him to carry out immediate repairs to Cairndhu House, near Larne. Rana was advised that the building would be taken from him if he did not comply with the works notice.

Rana himself states that he has protected a lot of heritage buildings in Belfast, including:

- The Oxford Street Church
- Andras House (built in 1889)
- The Lincoln Building
- Renshaws Hotel.

== Personal life ==
In 2012 he was cleared of the allegation that he had assaulted his estranged wife.

== Arms ==
Coat of arms of Diljit Rana, Baron Rana
Adopted 2007 Coronet Coronet of a Baron Crest Issuing from a lotus Argent a lion's face Or. Torse Or and Azure Escutcheon Argent semy of flames Gules three peacocks reguardant in pale Azure. Supporters On either side a chinkara Argent armed and unguled Or in the mouth a flax flower Proper slipped and leaved Or. Badge The Wheel of Ashoka Or encircled by a garland of flax flowers Proper slipped and leaved Or. Symbolism The achievement is full of allusion to North West India and the grantee's origins. The flax flower is used as an emblem for Northern Ireland.

== See also ==
- List of Northern Ireland Members of the House of Lords

Orders of precedence in the United Kingdom
Preceded by The Lord Giddens	Gentlemen; Baron Rana	Followed by The Lord Dykes
