= The Kelpies =

Sculpture by Andy Scott

Coordinates: 56.0192°N 3.7557°W

- An Each-Uisgean (Scottish Gaelic)
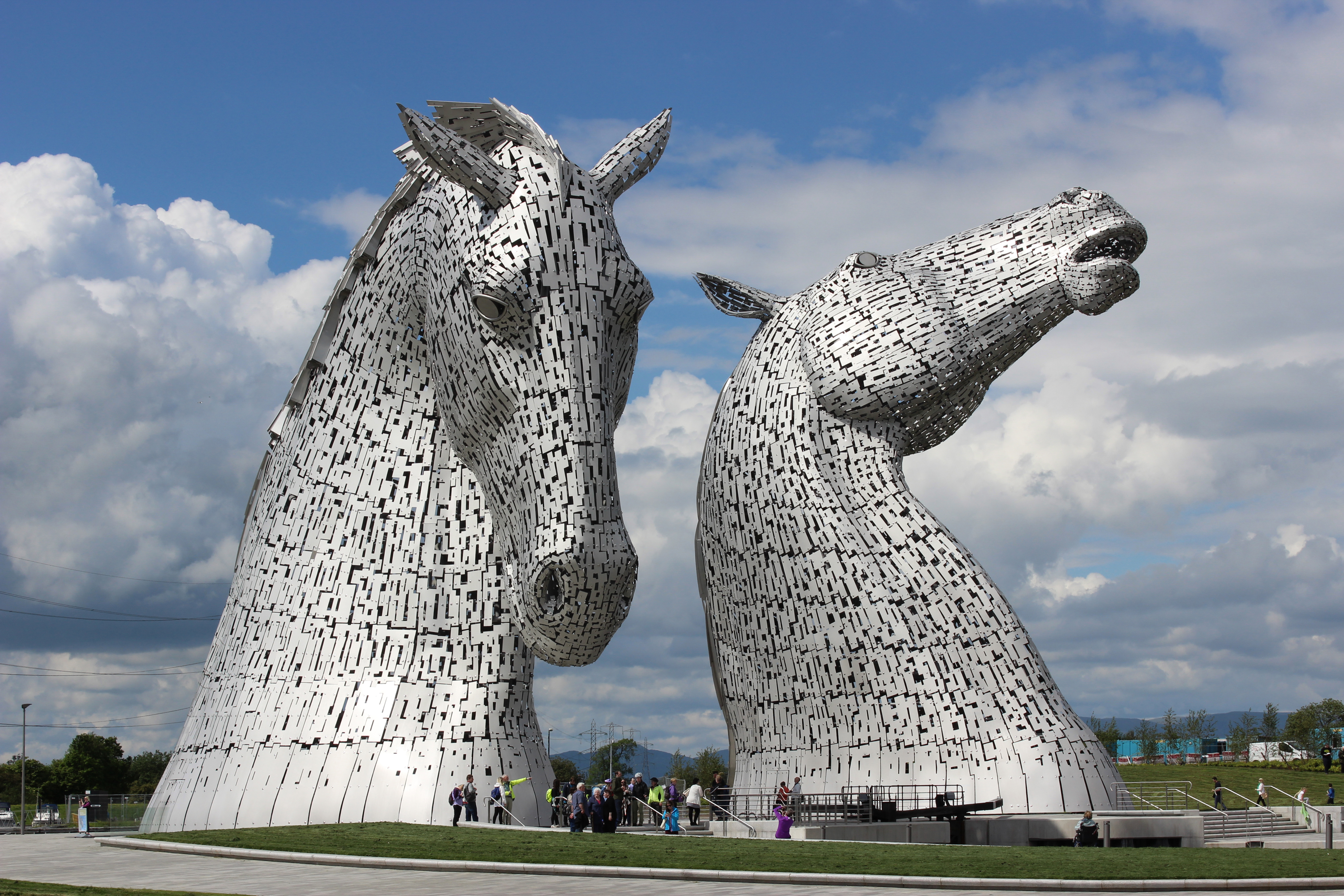
- The Kelpies in 2014
- Artist: Andy Scott
- Year: 2013
- Medium: Steel
- Subject: Kelpies
- Dimensions: 30 m (1,200 in)
- Weight: 300t (per head)
- Location: Grangemouth, Falkirk, Scotland
- Owner: Falkirk Council
- Website: www.thehelix.co.uk

The Kelpies are a pair of monumental steel horse-heads between the Scottish towns of Falkirk and Grangemouth. They stand next to the M9 motorway and form the eastern gateway of the Forth and Clyde Canal, which meets the River Carron here. Each head is 30 metres (98 ft) high and weighs approximately 300 tonnes (47,000 st).

The sculptures, which represent kelpies, were designed by sculptor Andy Scott and were completed in October 2013. An unveiling ceremony took place in April 2014. Around the sculptures is an area of parkland known as the Helix.

== History ==
The name was chosen by Scottish Canals at the inception of the Helix project in 2005, to reflect the mythological transforming beasts possessing the strength and endurance of ten horses. The Kelpies represent the lineage of the heavy horse of Scottish industry and economy, pulling the wagons, ploughs, barges, and coalships that shaped the geographical layout of the Falkirk area.

According to sculptor Andy Scott, "The original concept of mythical water horses was a valid starting point for the artistic development of the structures." He also said that he "took that concept and moved with it towards a more equine and contemporary response, shifting from any mythological references towards a socio-historical monument intended to celebrate the horse's role in industry and agriculture as well as the obvious association with the canals as tow horses". In 2008 Scott created three-metre (10') high miniature versions in his Glasgow studio. These were then scanned by lasers to help the steel fabricators create accurate full-scale components.

According to Scott the result would be "[w]ater-borne, towering gateways into The Helix, the Forth and Clyde Canal and Scotland, translating the legacy of the area into proud equine guardians".

The first routine maintenance and cleaning was carried out by a high-wire team in the summer of 2017.

== Structure ==
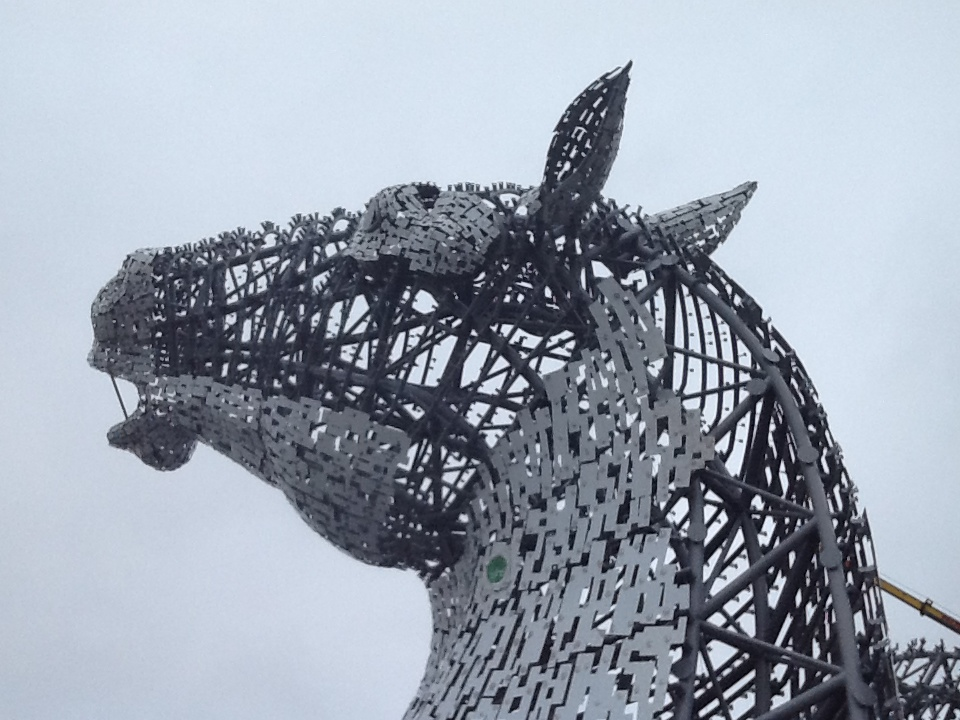
Kelpies under construction in 2013

Built of structural steel with a stainless steel cladding, The Kelpies are 30 metres (98 ft) high and weigh 300 tonnes each. Construction began in June 2013 and was complete by October 2013. A topping out ceremony was held on 27 November 2013. The Kelpies are positioned either side of a specially constructed lock and basin, part of the redeveloped Kelpies Hub. The forms are inspired by Clydesdale (draught) horses.

== Maquettes ==
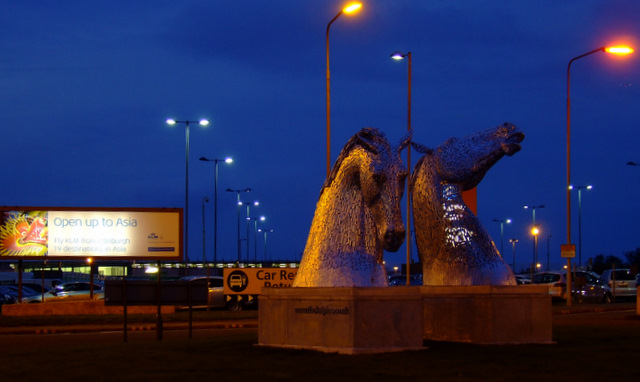
The maquettes on display at Edinburgh Airport

There are two sets of 1:10 scale maquettes. These have been displayed locally, nationally, and internationally at events and locations including Edinburgh Airport, the Field Museum in Grant Park, Chicago, The Falkirk Wheel, Expo 2011 (Aberdeen), Expo 2012 (Edinburgh) and Expo 2013 (Glasgow), BBC Scotland, Glasgow, Kirkcudbright Arts & Crafts Trail 2017, University of Glasgow, Sheffield International Steel Celebration, and later at Bryant Park in New York.

Sculpted from steel then galvanized using a hot dip process, the Kelpie maquettes were welded by hand from small plates of steel.

== Reception ==
During the first year following the opening, nearly one million people visited the sculptures.

Reception from tabloids in Scotland and the rest of Britain were largely positive. The Courier wrote that "Scots are being offered a tantalising glimpse of two staggering sculptures that will help transform the landscape of central Scotland." Tiffany Jenkins, writing for The Scotsman, opined: "They are impressive, stunning even, and I think people will become attached to them and proud of them. Of course, they will not please everyone, but that it is not possible as no such art work exists". Severin Carrell, writing for The Guardian in 2008, believed that the sculptures would "create one of the most dramatic gateways through which to enter Britain". Conversely, fellow Guardian writer Jonathan Jones was more critical upon their unveiling; deeming them "the latest misbegotten 'masterpiece' of public art. It is big. It is bold. And it is rotten. [...] The Kelpies is just a kitsch exercise in art 'for the people', carefully stripped of difficulty, controversy, and meaning."

Organisations also reacted favourably. The judges of the British Constructional Steelwork Association's Structural Steel Design Awards 2014 said the structures required "considerable engineering finesse"; while the New Civil Engineer website defined the Kelpies as "one of Scotland’s most complex sculptures". Additionally, the Ordnance Survey described them as "amazing and dramatic".

== See Also ==
Blue Mustang
