= Thanks-Giving Square =

Park in Dallas, Texas

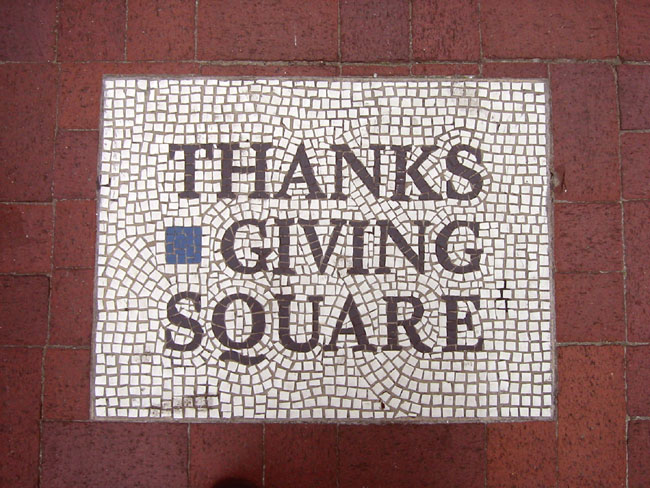
- Thanks-Giving Square Mosaic
- Interactive map of Thanks-Giving Square
- Type: Private Park and Public Facility
- Location: Dallas, Texas, US
- Coordinates: 32°46′58″N 96°47′54″W
- Created: 1976
- Operator: The Thanks-Giving Foundation
- Open: All year
- Website: www.thanksgiving.org

Thanks-Giving Square is a private park and public facility anchoring the Thanksgiving Commercial Center district of downtown Dallas, Texas, United States. Dedicated in 1976, the complex consists of three components: a landscaped garden and non-denominational chapel building, a major section of the underground pedestrian network, and the Bullington Truck Terminal. It was the first public-private partnership of its kind in Dallas.

After a lengthy global search, Peter Stewart, a Dallas businessman and one of the founders of the Thanks-Giving Foundation, chose architect Philip Johnson to design the project.

A symbolic structure was the key part of the program for the square, and it became pretty obvious soon that some of these top architects didn't have the background or feeling for the building that I envisaged would carry great meaning for another two hundred years.

== Project ==
The Thanks-Giving Foundation was started to create a public space in the center of Dallas. Construction began in 1973 in partnership between The Thanks-Giving Foundation and the City of Dallas. The Square was dedicated in November 1976 as one of the city's three United States Bicentennial projects. President Gerald Ford later recognized Thanks-Giving Square as a major national shrine. It welcomes people of all cultures and religions are welcome to celebrate values, thoughts, and spirituality in a contemplative setting.

Concurrent to private development, the City of Dallas constructed transportation infrastructure below the landscaped garden. The City of Dallas leases the land and subsurface from the Thanks-Giving Foundation, but owns the underground structures.

== The garden, chapel, and grounds ==
Pritzker Architecture Prize winner Philip Johnson was commissioned to bring the vision of Thanks-Giving Square to life. The Square is set fifteen feet below ground level with a four-foot wall blocking the sight of automobiles to create a serene, green island. Water plays a prominent role in the landscape, with active fountains masking city noise.

Overt religious symbolism is intentionally absent from the decoration of Thanks-Giving Square. Granite markers include references from Scripture, and the 100th Psalm is featured prominently in quotes and messages as delineated by Hindu, Jewish, Christian and Muslim authorities. Mosaic, stained glass, engraving, and graphic art adorn the walls and windows throughout Thanks-Giving Square.

=== Court of All Nations ===
At the western end of the park is the Court of All Nations, the ceremonial entryway that contains the Wall of Praise (featuring a portion of the text from Psalms 100) and Norman Rockwell's "Golden Rule" mosaic. The Ring of Thanks is a 14-foot (4.3 m) diameter aluminum ring is covered in 23 carat (96%) gold leaf. Visitors can walk through the ring before passing under a 50-foot (15 m) Bell Tower featuring three bronze bells designed in the form of the Liberty Bell.

Rockwell's Golden Rule Mosiac

=== Center Court of Praise ===
In the middle of the garden is the Center Court of Praise, which takes inspiration from public gathering spaces around the world. It is here that special events have celebrated "gratitude on the move" through speech, song, and dance. The aluminum and gold ring and nearby text reference this message found in Psalm 100. This area regularly holds special events, memorial services, and citywide prayer vigils (such as the one held after the 2016 shooting of Dallas police officers).

=== Grove ===
The Grove is a garden area designed for meditation and contemplation. In 1991, President George H. W. Bush dedicated the Wall of Presidents, a special display area celebrating the prayer and thanksgiving words of American presidents.

=== Hall of Thanksgiving ===
Below the chapel is the Hall of Thanksgiving, which tells the story of the American Thanksgiving tradition. The Hall of Thanksgiving is the exhibition, meeting, and resource center for Thanks-Giving Square. The pillared hall receives dignitaries and provides a forum for lectures, interfaith meetings, and educational programming. Artifacts on display include the Book of Prayers and presidential proclamations.

=== Chapel of Thanksgiving ===
The Chapel of Thanksgiving is the spiritual center of Thanks-Giving Square open to visitors of all faiths. The spiraling shape rises 90 feet (27.5 m) above street level, suggesting the infinite upward reach of the human spirit. The chapel's design takes its inspiration from the Great Mosque in Samarra, Iraq (itself derived from the square, spiral Pillar of Gor in Iran) and the ancient spiral of life. The entrance to the chapel is at the end of a 125-foot (38 m) bridge that runs over a cascading waterfall. The chapel ceiling contains the stained glass "Glory Window", one of largest horizontally mounted stained-glass pieces in the world. The 73 panels of faceted glass were designed by Gabriel Loire of Chartres, France featuring warmer and brighter colors as the spiral reaches its apex in the center. The window appears in a shot in director Terrence Malick's 2011 film The Tree of Life. Above the entry door is the etched glass window "The Spirit of Thanksgiving," designed by glass engraver John Hutton. Artwork by artist Bjørn Wiinblad is also on display. Visitors are encouraged to leave a personal statement of gratitude upon entering.

== Gallery of Thanks-Giving Square art and architecture ==
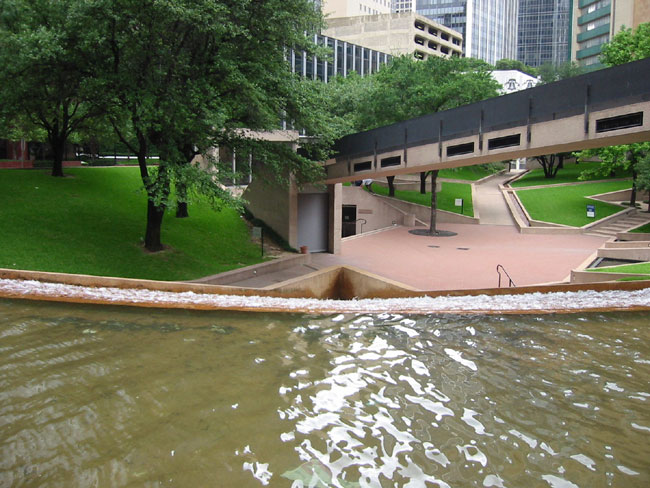
Center Court of Praise

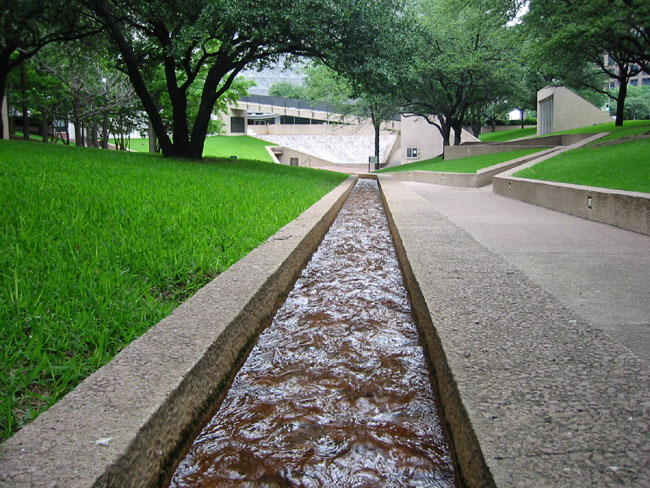
Thanks-Giving Square fountains

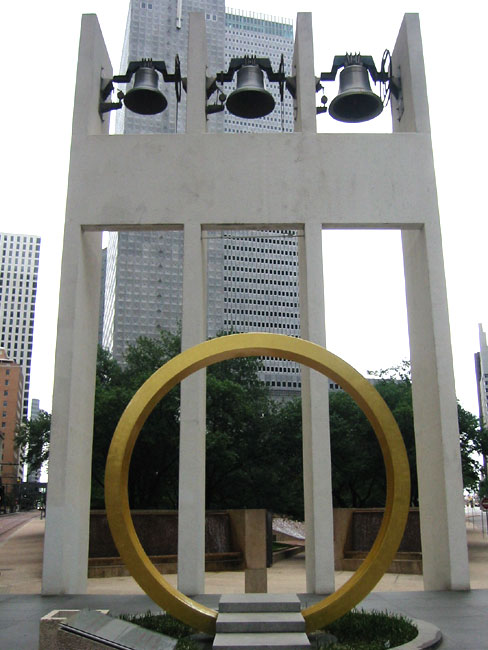
Bell Tower and Ring of Thanks

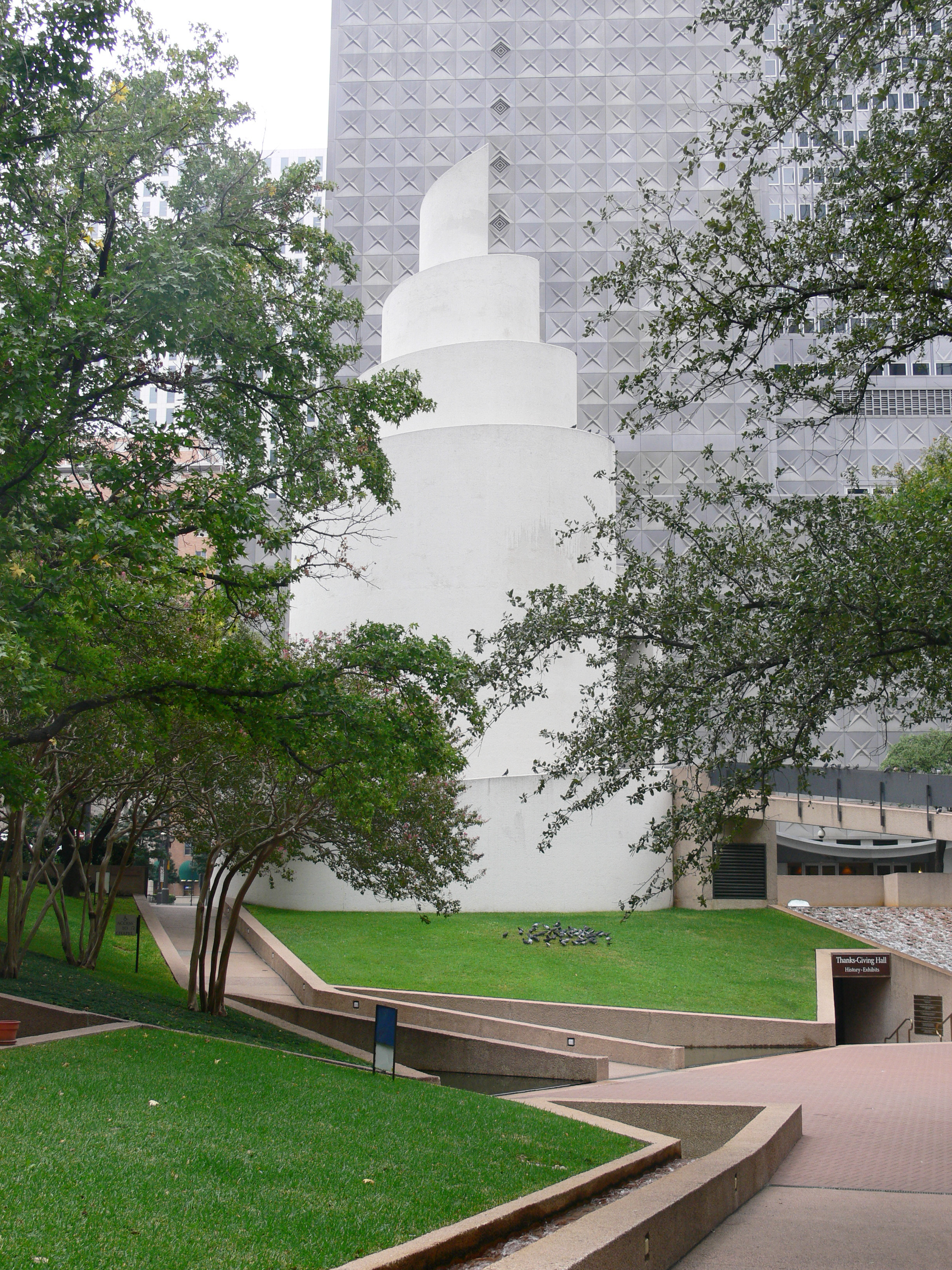
Exterior of the Chapel of Thanksgiving

== Pedway Network ==
A major node of the Dallas Pedestrian Network is situated one level below the garden, connecting several adjacent buildings with corridors lined in restaurant and retail space. Consecutive construction with the garden above allowed for skylights, wide walkways and several colorful atriums to disguise the fact that pedestrians are several feet underground. Unlike other portions of the pedway network that were privately constructed, the section beneath Thanks-Giving Square is operated by the City of Dallas. The network is accessed from the Center Court of Praise during business hours. Escalators bring the network to ground level at Bullington Street, which serves as a pedestrian mall and connects to the Bullington-Akard Skywalk. As of 2016, many of the access points had been closed.

== Bullington Truck Terminal ==
Thanks-Giving Square was originally planned as the first of several traffic-relieving complexes in downtown Dallas. The Bullington Truck Terminal, one of the key features in the Ponte-Travers-designed plan for downtown circulation, was constructed to consolidate street-level delivery trucks following Dallas' rapid growth in the 1960s. By placing truck traffic below-grade, it was estimated that 350 trucks per day would be removed from ground-level streets. The city issued $6.5 million for the project as part of the 1972 city bond program; construction was finished in 1977.

The city-owned truck terminal lies 50 feet below ground and contains 43 spaces for trucks, which enter from a portal located at Patterson Street. Adjacent buildings such as the Republic Center, Energy Plaza, Thanksgiving Tower and Fidelity Union Tower built connections to the truck terminal at their own expense and use it as their primary loading dock. Despite plans for several similar facilities in the Dallas Central Business District; the Bullington Truck Terminal was the only one funded and completed.

== End of an Era ==
In November 2025, after 53 years of Thanksgiving Square, Dallas City Manager Kim Tolbert and members of the city council decided to cut funding for Thanksgiving Foundation, the non-profit that is responsible for the 3-acre, sunken downtown haven. This includes the bell tower that has gold-leafed Circle of Thanks and the 90 ft tall chapel with the stained glass called “Glory Window.” As of April 1, 2026, the Thanksgiving Foundation was due $500,000 from the City of Dallas. The City claimed that they notified the foundation that they would no longer be providing any funding due to it not being included in the budget planning. Tolbert also cited “lack of public benefit” for the underground walkway.

These decisions were made by the City Council, with no public discussion, an incident that outraged many citizens. An unnamed council member stated that Tolbert ultimately made the executive decision during a closed session.

== See also ==
- Thanksgiving Square (Belfast)
