= New Orleans mayoral elections =

== Election results ==
The following is a list of elections in Mayor of New Orleans and a summary of their results.

=== Elections from 1866–1925 ===
The following is a list of elections held between the end of the Civil War and 1925.

1866 New Orleans mayoral election
John T. Monroe	3,469
James H. Moore	3,158
W. L. Robinson	33
George Purves	3

1868 New Orleans mayoral election
John R. Conway	Democrat	13,895
Seth W. Lewis	Republican	13,244

1870 New Orleans mayoral election

No election; Benjamin Flanders appointed by Governor Henry Clay Warmoth

1872 New Orleans mayoral election
Louis A. Wiltz	Democrat	23,896
W. R. Fish	Republican	12,984

1874 New Orleans mayoral election
Charles J. Leeds	Democrat	25,921
Felix Labatut	Republican	14,227

1876 New Orleans mayoral election
Edward Pilsbury	Democrat	25,031
C. B. White	Republican	15,022

1878 New Orleans mayoral election
Isaac W. Patton	13,932
Robert S. Howard	7,151
John Wilson	6,887
C. H. Thibault	1,140

1880 New Orleans mayoral election
Joseph A. Shakspeare	Democrat	9,803
Jules Denis	Democrat	9,362
Cyrus Bussey	Republican	4,644

1882 New Orleans mayoral election
William J. Behan	14,897
Abel W. Bosworth	5,346

1884 New Orleans mayoral election
J. Valsin Guillotte	18,278
William J. Behan	6,612

1888 New Orleans mayoral election
Joseph A. Shakspeare	23,313
Robert C. Davey	15,635

1892 New Orleans mayoral election
John Fitzpatrick	20,547
Joseph A. Shakspeare	17,289

1896 New Orleans mayoral election
Walter C. Flower	23,345
Charles S. Buck	17,295

1900 New Orleans mayoral election
Paul Capdevielle	19,366
Walter C. Flower	13,099

1904 New Orleans mayoral election
Martin Behrman	13,962
Charles F. Buck	10,047

1908 New Orleans mayoral election
Martin Behrman	26,897
John Porter (Socialist)	270
W. G. Tebault (independent)	89

1912 New Orleans mayoral election
Martin Behrman	27,371
Charles F. Claiborne	13,917

1916 New Orleans mayoral election
Martin Behrman by acclamation
Socialist candidate, Weller, received about 700 votes

1920 New Orleans mayoral election
Andrew J. McShane	22,767	51%
Martin Behrman	21,443	48%

1925 New Orleans mayoral election
Martin Behrman	35,911
Paul H. Maloney	33,471
Andrew J. McShane	

=== Elections since 1930 ===
Since 1930, New Orleans has used a two-round system with a preliminary round and a runoff if no candidate reached a majority in the first round.

Election	First round						Second round						Sources
Election	Winner/top finisher	Votes		Runner(s)-up^{A}	Votes		Winner	Votes		Runner-up	Votes		Sources
Election	Winner/top finisher	#	%	Runner(s)-up^{A}	#	%	Winner	#	%	Runner-up	#	%	Sources
1930	T. Semmes Walmsley (incumbent)			Francis Williams									
1934	T. Semmes Walmsley (incumbent)	47,753	45	John Klorer, Sr.	32,066	29	cancelled after Klorer withdrew						
1934	T. Semmes Walmsley (incumbent)	47,753	45	Francis Williams	28,085	26	cancelled after Klorer withdrew						
1936	Robert Maestri by acclamation						—N/a						
1938	cancelled by constitutional amendment						—N/a						
1942	Robert Maestri (incumbent)	75,713	55	Shirley Wimberley			—N/a						
1946	deLesseps Morrison	67,160	50.2	Robert Maestri (incumbent)	63,273	47.3	—N/a						
1950	deLesseps Morrison (incumbent)	120,582	65.1	Charles C. Zatarain	58,260	31.6	—N/a						
1954	deLesseps Morrison (incumbent)	94,313	59.4	Thomas Brahney	49,849	31.4	—N/a						
1958	deLesseps Morrison (incumbent)	90,802		Claude W. Duke	42,231		deLesseps Morrison (incumbent)	90,802	57.7	Claude W. Duke	43,231	27.4	
1958	deLesseps Morrison (incumbent)	90,802		Fred C. Donaldson	18,999		deLesseps Morrison (incumbent)	90,802	57.7	Claude W. Duke	43,231	27.4	
1962	Adrian Duplantier	57,001		Victor Schiro	52,685		Victor Schiro	94,157	56.3	Adrian Duplantier	73,057	43.7	
1962	Adrian Duplantier	57,001		James A. Comiskey	37,557		Victor Schiro	94,157	56.3	Adrian Duplantier	73,057	43.7	
1962	Adrian Duplantier	57,001		Paul Burke	18,913		Victor Schiro	94,157	56.3	Adrian Duplantier	73,057	43.7	
1965	Victor Schiro (incumbent)	81,973	50.1	Jimmy Fitzmorris	78,654	48.1	—N/a						
1969–70	Jimmy Fitzmorris	59,301	34.53	Moon Landrieu	33,093	19.27	Moon Landrieu	89,554	53.8	Jimmy Fitzmorris	76,726	46.2	
1969–70	Jimmy Fitzmorris	59,301	34.53	William J. Guste	29,487	17.17	Moon Landrieu	89,554	53.8	Jimmy Fitzmorris	76,726	46.2	
1969–70	Jimmy Fitzmorris	59,301	34.53	John J. Petre	22,471	13.08	Moon Landrieu	89,554	53.8	Jimmy Fitzmorris	76,726	46.2	
1969–70	Jimmy Fitzmorris	59,301	34.53	David Gertler	20,572	11.98	Moon Landrieu	89,554	53.8	Jimmy Fitzmorris	76,726	46.2	
1973	Moon Landrieu (incumbent)	91,007	69.6	A. S. Lee Fernandez	30,857	23.6	—N/a						
1977	Ernest Morial	41,182	26.63	Joe DiRosa	36,862	23.84	Ernest Morial	90,539	51.7	Joe DiRosa	84,325	48.3	
1977	Ernest Morial	41,182	26.63	Nat Kiefer	36,597	23.67	Ernest Morial	90,539	51.7	Joe DiRosa	84,325	48.3	
1977	Ernest Morial	41,182	26.63	deLesseps Morrison, Jr.	32,176	20.81	Ernest Morial	90,539	51.7	Joe DiRosa	84,325	48.3	
1982	Ernest Morial (incumbent)	75,929	46.94	Ron Faucheux	73,441	45.35	Ernest Morial (incumbent)	100,703	53.2	Ron Faucheux	88,583	46.8	
1982	Ernest Morial (incumbent)	75,929	46.94	William J. Jefferson	11,327	6.98	Ernest Morial (incumbent)	100,703	53.2	Ron Faucheux	88,583	46.8	
1986	William J. Jefferson	62,333	38.6	Sidney Barthelemy	53,961	33.4	Sidney Barthelemy	93,050	58	Bill Jefferson	67,680	42	
1986	William J. Jefferson	62,333	38.6	Sam LeBlanc	40,963	25.2	Sidney Barthelemy	93,050	58	Bill Jefferson	67,680	42	
1990	Sidney Barthelemy (incumbent)	79,995	55	Donald Mintz	65,047	44	—N/a						
1994	Donald Mintz	56,305	37	Marc Morial	49,604	32	Marc Morial	93,094	54	Donald Mintz	77,730	46	
1994	Donald Mintz	56,305	37	Mitch Landrieu	14,689	10	Marc Morial	93,094	54	Donald Mintz	77,730	46	
1994	Donald Mintz	56,305	37	Sherman Copelin	11,731	8	Marc Morial	93,094	54	Donald Mintz	77,730	46	
1994	Donald Mintz	56,305	37	Ken Carter	10,818	7	Marc Morial	93,094	54	Donald Mintz	77,730	46	
1998	Marc Morial (incumbent)	92,378	79	Kathleen Cresson	22,767	20	—N/a						
2002	Ray Nagin	38,323	29	Richard Pennington	31,259	23	Ray Nagin	76,639	59	Richard Pennington	53,836	41	
2002	Ray Nagin	38,323	29	Paulette Irons	24,557	18	Ray Nagin	76,639	59	Richard Pennington	53,836	41	
2002	Ray Nagin	38,323	29	Jim Singleton	17,503	13	Ray Nagin	76,639	59	Richard Pennington	53,836	41	
2002	Ray Nagin	38,323	29	Troy Carter	13,898	10	Ray Nagin	76,639	59	Richard Pennington	53,836	41	
2006	Ray Nagin (incumbent)	41,561	38	Mitch Landrieu	31,551	29	Ray Nagin (incumbent)	59,460	52	Mitch Landrieu	54,131	48	
2006	Ray Nagin (incumbent)	41,561	38	Ron Forman	18,764	17	Ray Nagin (incumbent)	59,460	52	Mitch Landrieu	54,131	48	
2006	Ray Nagin (incumbent)	41,561	38	Rob Couhig	10,312	10	Ray Nagin (incumbent)	59,460	52	Mitch Landrieu	54,131	48	
2010	Mitch Landrieu	58,279	65.52	Troy Henry	12,278	13.8	—N/a						
2010	Mitch Landrieu	58,279	65.52	John Georges	8,190	9.21	—N/a						
2010	Mitch Landrieu	58,279	65.52	Rob Couhig	4,874	5.48	—N/a						
2014	Mitch Landrieu (incumbent)	53,441	63.57	Michael Bagneris	27,991	33.29	—N/a						
2017	LaToya Cantrell	32,025	39	Desiree M. Charbonnet	25,028	30.48	LaToya Cantrell	51,342	60.4	Desiree M. Charbonnet	33,729	39.7	
2017	LaToya Cantrell	32,025	39	Michael Bagernis	15,405	18.76	LaToya Cantrell	51,342	60.4	Desiree M. Charbonnet	33,729	39.7	
2017	LaToya Cantrell	32,025	39	Troy Henry	5,270	6.42	LaToya Cantrell	51,342	60.4	Desiree M. Charbonnet	33,729	39.7	
2021	LaToya Cantrell (incumbent)	48,750	64.7	Vina Nguyen	10,133	13.5	—N/a						
2021	LaToya Cantrell (incumbent)	48,750	64.7	Leilani Heno	6,605	8.8	—N/a						
2021	LaToya Cantrell (incumbent)	48,750	64.7	Belden Batiste	3,863	5.1	—N/a						
2025	Helena Moreno	57,797	54.87	Royce Duplessis	23,474	22.29	—N/a						
2025	Helena Moreno	57,797	54.87	Oliver Thomas	19,619	18.63	—N/a						

== Notes ==
A. Only listing candidates who received a vote share of at least 5%
