= 2002 New Orleans mayoral election =

- February 2, 2002 (first round); March 2, 2002 (runoff)
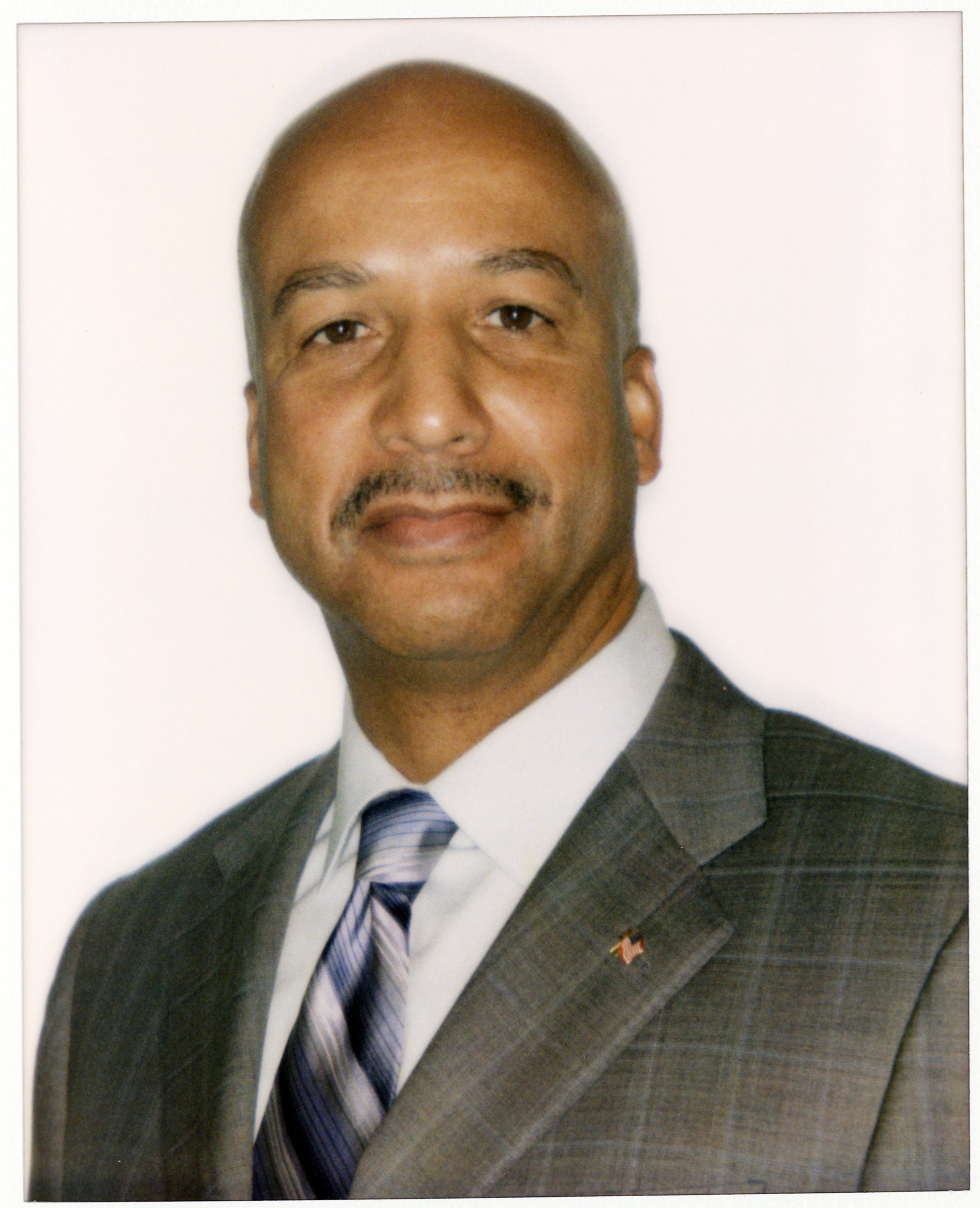

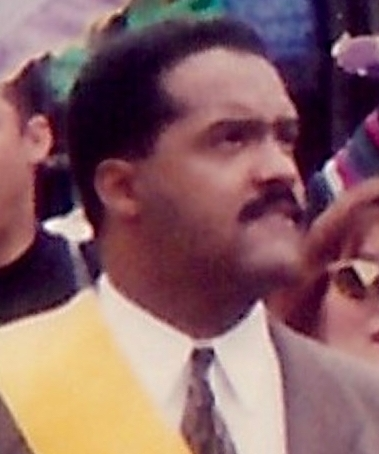
Candidate	Ray Nagin	Richard Pennington	Paulette Irons
Party	Democratic	Democratic	Democratic
First round	38,323; 28.68%	31,259; 23.4%	24,557; 18.38%
Runoff	76,639; 58.74%	53,836; 41.26%	Eliminated
Candidate	Jim Singleton	Troy Carter
Party	Democratic	Democratic
First round	17,503; 13.1%	13,898; 10.4%
Runoff	Eliminated	Eliminated
Results by precinct:
Nagin:
50–60%
60–70%
70–80%
80–90%
>90%
Pennington:
50–60%
60–70%
70-80%
Tie:
(between Nagin and Pennington)
Mayor before election
Marc Morial
Democratic
Elected mayor
Ray Nagin
Democratic

The 2002 New Orleans mayoral election was held on February 2, 2002, followed by a runoff on March 2 to elect the Mayor of New Orleans. It resulted in the election of Ray Nagin as mayor.

== Background ==
In New Orleans, Louisiana mayoral elections, there is an open primary. Unless one candidate takes more than 50% of the vote in the first round, a run-off election is then held between the top two candidates in the primary round of voting. In this case, the runoff was held on March 2, 2002. In the runoff, Ray Nagin defeated Richard Pennington to become mayor of New Orleans, the first time in over 50 years that a New Orleans mayor had been elected with no previous experience as an elected official.

== Candidates ==
The election campaign opened with the attempt of two-term mayor Marc Morial to change the city charter to allow him to run for a third term. Morial's attempt was unsuccessful, so a perceived political vacuum attracted a larger-than-usual number of candidates.

- Ray Nagin, vice president and general manager of New Orleans cable provider Cox Communications, entered the race later than most other major candidates. He campaigned as a pro-business reformer and political outsider in a race against several career politicians, promising to enact reform proposals outlined by the Bureau of Governmental Research, a good-government group. Financing his campaign mainly through his own resources, he went into the campaign relatively unknown outside business circles, but gained support after strong showings in debates and influential endorsements from the Times-Picayune and the Gambit newspapers.
- Richard Pennington was brought to New Orleans in October 1994 by then-mayor Marc Morial to lead the cleanup of the corruption-ridden NOPD as Police Superintendent. He entered the race after Morial failed in his attempt to run for reelection, and emerged as the expected front-runner with high name-recognition and endorsements from US Representative Bill Jefferson and District Attorney Harry Connick Sr. Emphasizing a results-oriented administration, he promised to develop a computer-based program called Citystat to monitor city repairs and maintenance, and to streamline the process of obtaining licences and permits.
- State Senator Paulette Irons ran describing herself as a "fiscal conservative with a social conscience." She was considered an early front-runner, spending much of the campaign in a dead heat with Pennington, before her support faltered in the face of criticisms and attack ads accusing her of misrepresenting the death of her brother, who was killed while robbing a grocery store in 1980. Her disappointing showing in the primary was a surprise to many political pundits.
- Jim Singleton's career in politics began in the 1970s under mayor Moon Landrieu and included a 24-year stint on the city council. Leader of the Central City political organization BOLD, Singleton controlled a powerful voting bloc in council for much of the 1990s.
- Troy Carter, city council member for District C, ran on a campaign promoting economic development. With a reputation as an aggressive fundraiser, he raised $1.1 million for his primary race, more than any of his opponents.

Other candidates also running included:

- Tulane University law professor Vernon Palmer
- Pastor Leonard Lucas, who defeated longtime incumbent Sherman Copelin to become a State Representative in 1999
- funeral home owner Emile Labat
- Clarence Hunt, the owner of two employment recruiting firms, who returned to New Orleans to run for mayor after living in California for years
- gardener Quentin Brown Jr.
- lawyer Thomas Delahay Dunn Jr.
- University of New Orleans student Timothy Hill
- unemployed actor and supermarket produce manager Manny "Chevrolet" Bruno
- lawyer Ed Cerrone
- plumber Albert "Superman" Jones
- Write-in Drew “Player for Mayor” Michel

== Campaign ==
The primary campaign was relatively short and quiet. The candidates agreed on most major issues, including the need to boost the city's economic climate by eliminating patronage and improving public schools. Some controversy arose from one of Nagin's main campaign planks, a proposal to sell or lease the city's Louis Armstrong International Airport and use the money to improve roads and schools. Other candidates proposed regionalizing the airport, but were unwilling to take the drastic step desired by Nagin. Nagin also proposed setting up committees to oversee the appointment of officials in an effort to curb political patronage, while Pennington insisted on retaining mayoral prerogative in appointments. Nagin was also the only candidate to oppose a living wage referendum, which passed but was eventually defeated in court.

Nagin went into the primary round of voting with influential endorsements from both the Times-Picayune and the Gambit. Outgoing mayor Marc Morial did not endorse any candidates in the primary or the runoff; both leading candidates were promising a reduction in the patronage that was so prominent in Morial's administration.

The runoff campaign saw Nagin pick up endorsements from defeated candidates Singleton, Carter, and Lucas. The campaign took a negative turn when ads appeared attacking Nagin's credentials as a member of the Democratic party, and when Pennington professed to have information about Nagin that 'sickened him to the core', without specifying its nature.

== Results ==
Mayoral Primary, February 2

Mayoral primary results
Party	Candidate	Votes	%
Democratic	Ray Nagin	38,323	28.68
Democratic	Richard Pennington	31,259	23.4
Democratic	Paulette Irons	24,557	18.38
Democratic	Jim Singleton	17,503	13.1
Democratic	Troy Carter	13,898	10.4
Democratic	Vernon Palmer	3,442	2.58
Democratic	Leonard Lucas	2,102	1.57
Democratic	Emile Labat	637	0.48
Other	Quentin Brown Jr.	422	0.32
Republican	Thomas Delahay Dunn Jr.	334	0.25
Republican	Timothy Hill	309	0.23
Republican	Clarence Hunt	289	0.22
Other	Manny Bruno	274	0.21
Other	Ed Cerrone	136	0.1
Democratic	Albert "Superman" Jones	116	0.09
Total votes		133,601	

The most prominent feature of the primary results was a dramatic surge in Nagin's support; going into the primary, Pennington was widely predicted to finish first. Precinct-by-precinct returns prompted political analysts to attribute Nagin's first-place finish in the primary to a high turnout by white voters who disproportionately preferred Nagin to his main opponent, Pennington. Nagin also saw support in higher-income black neighborhoods. Pennington found his main base of support in predominantly African-American neighborhoods, winning 217 black-majority precincts to Nagin's 46. The primary results were also seen as a rejection of New Orleans politics-as-usual; both the runoff candidates were political newcomers despite the candidacies of several prominent politicians.

Runoff, March 2

Candidate	Votes received	Percentage of votes cast
Ray Nagin	76,639	58.74%
Richard Pennington	53,836	41.26%

In the runoff, Nagin kept the base he had established in the primary, but expanded his support to win every majority-white precinct. Pennington maintained his base among lower and middle-class black voter, but was unable to pick up the support of many voters who had supported candidates defeated in the primary. Ray Nagin's runoff victory sent him to city hall, where he has served as New Orleans's mayor since May 2002.

Preceded by 1998 mayoral election	New Orleans mayoral elections	Succeeded by 2006 mayoral election
