= 1973 New Orleans mayoral election =

- November 10, 1973
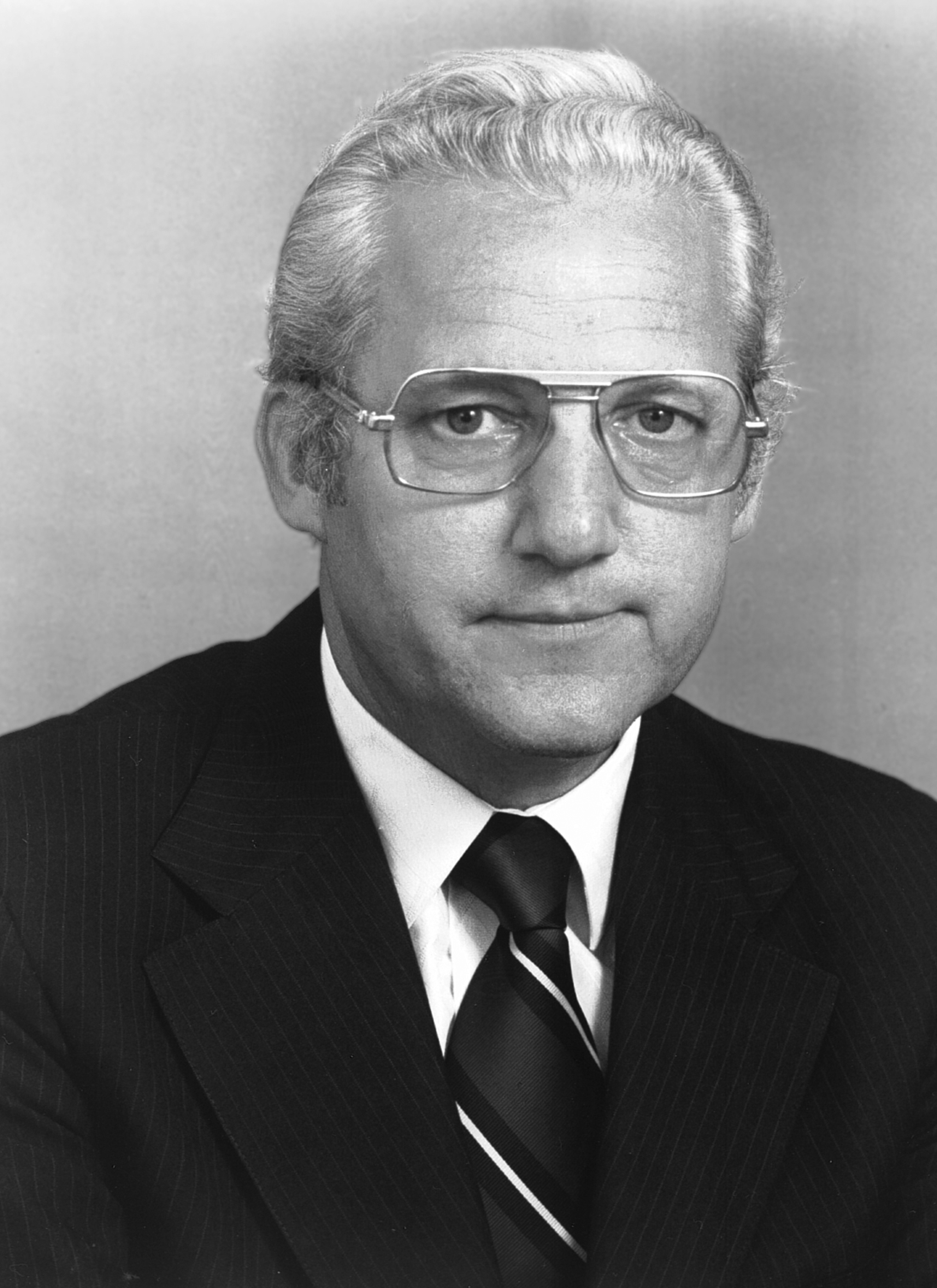

Candidate	Moon Landrieu	A. S. Lee Fernandez
Party	Democratic
Popular vote	91,007	65,047
Percentage	69.60%	23.60%
Mayor before election
Moon Landrieu
Democratic
Elected mayor
Moon Landrieu
Democratic

The New Orleans mayoral election of 1973 resulted in the reelection of Moon Landrieu to his second term as mayor of New Orleans. The primary round of voting was held on November 10; no runoff was required. Unlike the previous election, the Republicans did not field a challenger to Landrieu, and thus was automatically elected following the Democratic primary.

The 1973 elections were the last municipal elections in New Orleans held using the closed primary system. In 1975, Louisiana Governor Edwin Edwards signed a bill which changed all elections, except those for president, to an open primary system where all candidates regardless of party run on the same ballot. If one candidate does not receive an absolute majority (defined as 50 percent plus one vote), the top two finishers contest a runoff election.

== Results ==
Primary, November 10

Candidate	Votes received
Moon Landrieu (incumbent)	91,007
A. S. Lee Fernandez	30,857
Addison Roswell Thompson	4,925
Rodney Fertel (former husband of restaurateur Ruth Fertel)	3,971

Preceded by 1969-70 mayoral election	New Orleans mayoral elections	Succeeded by 1977 mayoral election

== Sources ==
- Orleans Parish Democratic Executive Committee. First and Second Democratic Primary Elections, 1973.
