= 1977 New Orleans mayoral election =

1977 New Orleans Mayoral Election
- October 1, 1977 (first round); November 12, 1977 (runoff)
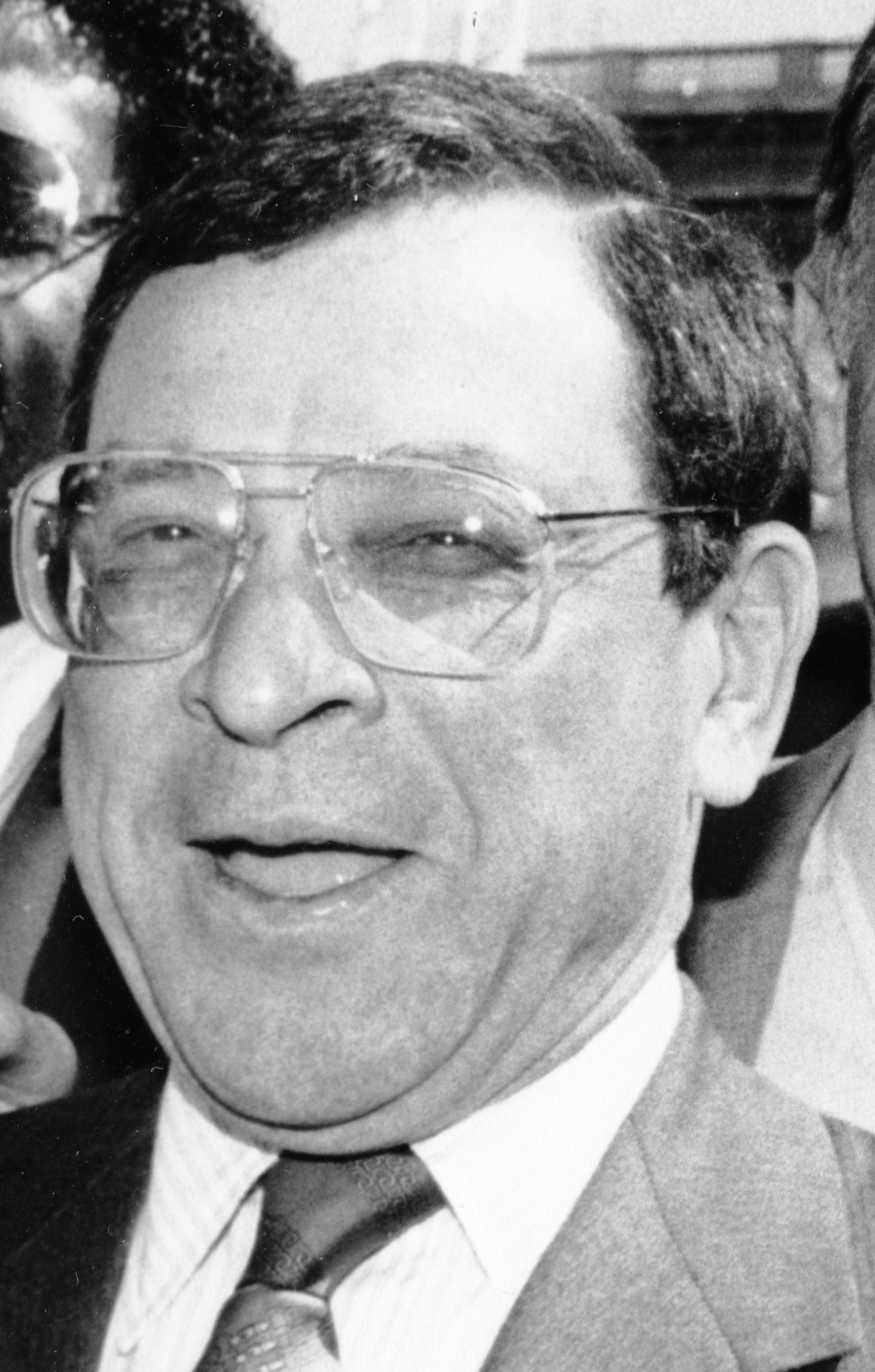

Candidate	Ernest Morial	Joe DiRosa
Party	Democratic
First round	41,182; 26.63%	36,862; 23.84%
Runoff	90,539; 51.78%	84,325; 48.22%
Candidate	Nat Kiefer	Toni Morrison
Party		Democratic
First round	36,597; 23.67%	32,176; 20.81%
Runoff	Eliminated	Eliminated
Mayor before election
Moon Landrieu
Democratic
Elected mayor
Ernest Morial
Democratic

The New Orleans mayoral election of 1977 resulted in the election of Ernest Morial as the first African-American mayor of New Orleans.

== Background ==
Elections in Louisiana—with the exception of U.S. presidential elections—follow a variation of the open primary system. Candidates of any and all parties are listed on one ballot; voters need not limit themselves to the candidates of one party. Unless one candidate takes more than 50% of the vote in the first round, a run-off election is then held between the top two candidates, who may in fact be members of the same party. In this election, the first round of voting was held on October 1, 1977, and the runoff was held on November 12.

The 1977 municipal elections were the first under Louisiana's open primary law signed by Governor Edwin Edwards two years earlier.

Under the New Orleans City Charter adopted by voters in 1954, Incumbent mayor Moon Landrieu was term-limited.

== Results ==
Primary, October 1
A total of 154,643 votes were cast

Candidate	Votes received	%
Ernest Morial	41,182	26.63%
Joe DiRosa	36,862	23.84%
Nat Kiefer	36,597	23.67%
DeLesseps "Toni" Morrison, Jr.	32,176	20.81%
Thomas Lewis Giraud	5,215	3.37%
Herbert W. Christenberry, Jr.	1,381	0.89%
Joel Aber	377	0.24%
Rodney Fertel	293	0.19%
Cecil M. Shilstone	191	0.12%
Thomas Joseph Garnier	188	0.12%
George A. Aiavolasiti	181	0.12%

Runoff, November 12

Candidate	Votes received	%
Ernest Morial	90,539	51.78%
Joe DiRosa	84,325	48.22%

Preceded by 1973 mayoral election	New Orleans mayoral elections	Succeeded by 1982 mayoral election

== Sources ==
- Board of Supervisors of Elections for the Parish of Orleans. Election Returns of Orleans Parish, 1977.
