= 1994 New Orleans mayoral election =

- February 5, 1994 (first round); March 5, 1994 (runoff)
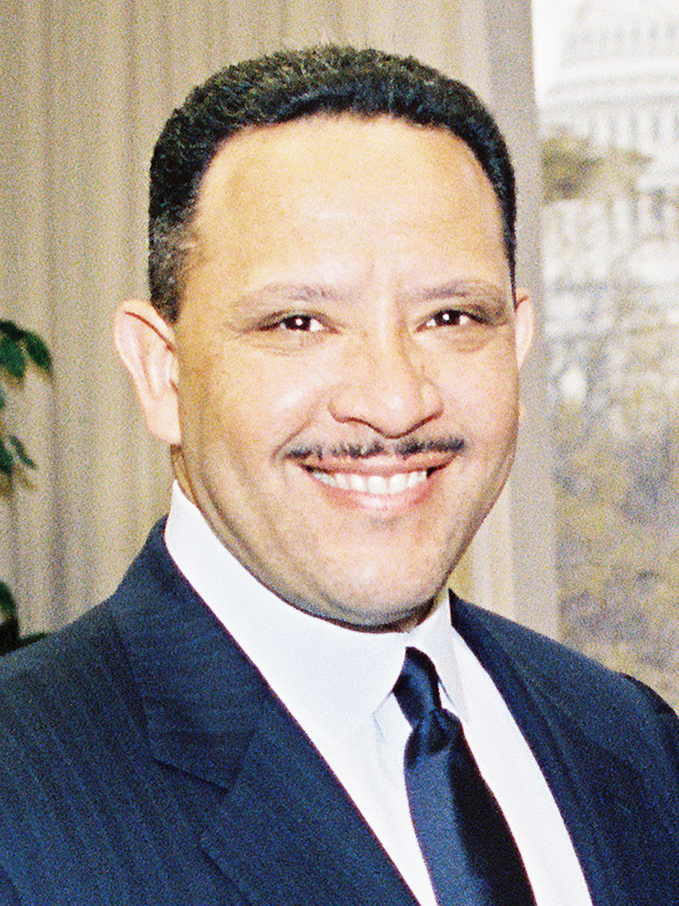

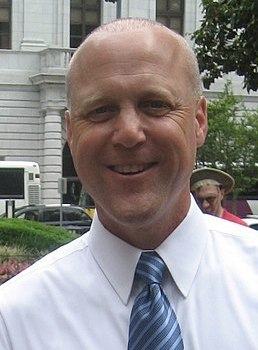
| Candidate | Marc Morial | Donald Mintz | Mitch Landrieu |
| Party | Democratic | Democratic | Democratic |
| First round | 49,604; 32.48% | 56,305; 36.87% | 14,689; 9.62% |
| Runoff | 93,094; 54.5% | 77,730; 45.5% | Eliminated |
| Candidate | Sherman Copelin | Ken Carter |
| Party | Democratic | Democratic |
| First round | 11,731; 7.68% | 10,818; 7.08% |
| Runoff | Eliminated | Eliminated |
Mayor before election
Sidney Barthelemy
Democratic
Elected mayor
Marc Morial
Democratic

The New Orleans mayoral election of 1994 was held on March 5, 1994 and resulted in the election of Marc Morial as Mayor of New Orleans.

== Background ==
Elections in Louisiana—with the exception of U.S. presidential elections—follow a variation of the open primary system. Candidates of any and all parties are listed on one ballot; voters need not limit themselves to the candidates of one party. Unless one candidate takes more than 50% of the vote in the first round, a run-off election is then held between the top two candidates, who may in fact be members of the same party. In this election, the first round was held on February 5, 1994, and the runoff was held on March 5, 1994.

== Candidates ==
- Marc Morial, a first-term state senator, and the son of New Orleans's first black mayor Ernest Morial
- Donald Mintz, a lawyer and civic activist who had previously run for mayor in 1990.
- Mitch Landrieu, a State Representative since 1987 and the son of former New Orleans mayor Moon Landrieu
- State Representative and Speaker Pro Tempore Sherman Copelin, an influential leader of the Ninth Ward political organization SOUL. Copelin personally funded an expensive campaign costing over $1 million.
- First District City Assessor Ken Carter
- Lambert Bossiere, Jr., city councillor for District D since 1981 and member of the Seventh Ward political organization COUP. Boissiere was supported by outgoing mayor Sidney Barthelemy.
- lawyer Roy Raspanti
- Arthur P. Jacobs, manager of a construction business
- Julius "Chip" Leahman
- Jerome E. Slade

== Campaign ==
Given that incumbent mayor Sidney Barthelemy was barred by the city charter from running for a third term, the 1994 mayoral race was seen as one of the most wide-open races in years, with a number of high-profile candidates running. Mintz began his campaign shortly after his loss to Barthelemy in 1990, and remained a front-runner throughout the lengthy campaign. After months of speculation, Dutch Morial's widow Sybil Morial decided not to run; her son, Marc Morial then entered the race as the candidate of the Morial family's LIFE organization. After Mitch Landrieu entered the race, much of the election coverage focused on the battle between two sons of former mayors.

The most prominent political issue of the campaign was New Orleans's drastically worsening crime problem, but the two leading candidates - Morial and Mintz - had similar positions on most issues. Rather than a focus on issues, the bitterly contested campaign saw a number of personal attacks, including rumors of Marc Morial's drug use. The runoff campaign was dominated by allegations that a senior campaign worker for Mintz had distributed racist fliers which questioned the religion and sexual orientation of various candidates.

== Results ==
Results of first round of voting, February 5

| Candidate | Party affiliation | Votes received | Percentage of votes cast |
|---|---|---|---|
| Donald Mintz | Democrat | 56,305 | 36.87% |
| Marc Morial | Democrat | 49,604 | 32.48% |
| Mitch Landrieu | Democrat | 14,689 | 9.62% |
| Sherman Copelin | Democrat | 11,731 | 7.68% |
| Ken Carter | Democrat | 10,818 | 7.08% |
| Lambert Boissiere, Jr. | Democrat | 5,466 | 3.58% |
| Roy Raspanti | Other | 3,740 | 2.45% |
| Arthur P. Jacobs | Democrat | 131 | 0.09% |
| Julius "Chip" Leahman | Democrat | 117 | 0.08% |
| Jerome E. Slade | Other | 101 | 0.07% |

Results of runoff, March 5

| Candidate | Party affiliation | Votes received | Percentage of votes cast |
|---|---|---|---|
| Marc Morial | Democrat | 93,094 | 54.5% |
| Donald Mintz | Democrat | 77,730 | 45.5% |

== Sources ==
- Louisiana Secretary of State Elections Division. Official Election Results Database
- The Times-Picayune. "Mintz - 37% vs. Morial - 32%; Candidates expecting tough race." February 6, 1994.
- The Times-Picayune. "It's Morial! Sweeping victory caps dirty campaign." March 6, 1994.

| Preceded by 1990 mayoral election | New Orleans mayoral elections | Succeeded by 1998 mayoral election |
