= 1982 New Orleans mayoral election =

1982 New Orleans Mayoral Election
- February 6, 1982 (first round); March 20, 1982 (runoff)
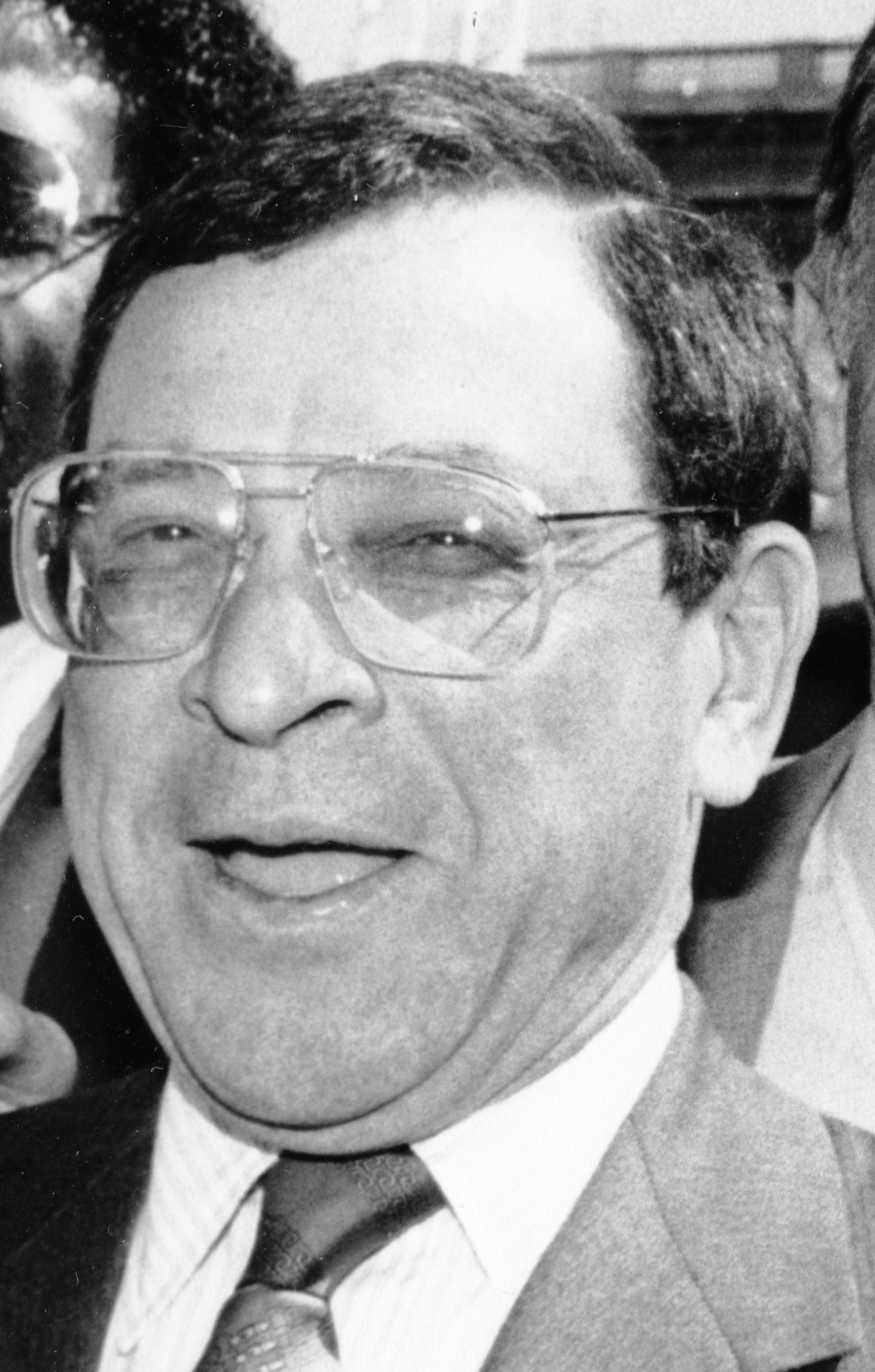

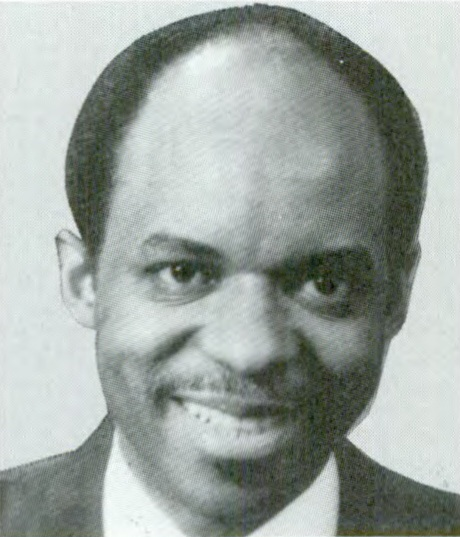
Candidate	Ernest Morial	Ron Faucheux	Bill Jefferson
Party	Democratic	Democratic	Democratic
First round	75,929; 46.91%	73,441; 23.61%	11,327; 7%
Runoff	100,703; 53.2%	88,583; 46.8%	Eliminated
Mayor before election
Ernest Morial
Democratic
Elected mayor
Ernest Morial
Democratic

The New Orleans mayoral election of 1982 resulted in the reelection of Ernest Morial to a second term as mayor of New Orleans.

== Background ==
Elections in Louisiana—with the exception of U.S. presidential elections—follow a variation of the open primary system. Candidates of any and all parties are listed on one ballot; voters need not limit themselves to the candidates of one party. Unless one candidate takes more than 50% of the vote in the first round, a run-off election is then held between the top two candidates, who may in fact be members of the same party. In this election, the first round of voting was held on February 6, 1982, and the runoff was held on March 20.

== Candidates ==
- Incumbent Mayor Ernest 'Dutch' Morial, the city's first African-American mayor
- Ron Faucheux, a white 31-year-old member of the Louisiana House of Representatives who had represented District 100 in New Orleans East since 1976.
- State Senator William J. Jefferson
- Rodney Fertel, perennial candidate and ex-husband of Ruth's Chris Steak House founder Ruth Fertel
- Rashaad Ali, who ran as a Socialist candidate
- Leon Waters, who ran as a Socialist candidate under the slogan "For jobs and justice, make the rich pay!" His platform emphasized ending police brutality, prison reform, and rent control.

== Campaign ==
Throughout the campaign, challengers Faucheux and Jefferson were able to make Morial the main campaign issue. Faucheux accused Morial of allowing the New Orleans Police Department to deteriorate and crime to rise, and emphasized the mayor's poor relations with City Council and the state Legislature. Jefferson accused Morial of having done little to aid the city's African-American community or to curb police brutality. Both major challengers argued that the mayor's abrasive personality hampered his leadership of the city.

Morial defended his record as mayor and emphasized the economic growth that had occurred during his term as mayor, including the development of many new buildings in the Central Business District, the construction of the New Orleans Convention Center, and industrial development in New Orleans East. He also cited his progress in eliminating bureaucracy and streamlining city governance. Morial was aided by endorsements by several black political organizations, including BOLD and SOUL, as well as the Louisiana Weekly newspaper and the Regular Democratic Organization.

Faucheux stressed his anti-crime credentials during his time in the state legislature, and made the transferral of sales tax revenue from the state to the city one of his major campaign promises. Faucheux was endorsed by the Alliance for Good Government.

Jefferson also emphasized that the city would need new sources of revenue, and promised to work to eliminate the homestead exemption on real estate tax. Jefferson's campaign was damaged by accusations by some black leaders that he was trying to divide the black community by challenging the city's first black mayor and forcing him into a runoff against a white opponent.

== Results ==
Primary, February 6

Candidate	Votes received	Percentage
Ernest Morial (incumbent)	75,929	46.91%
Ron Faucheux	73,441	45.37%
William J. Jefferson	11,327	7%
Rodney Fertel	462	0.29%
Rashaad Ali	355	0.22%
Leon Waters	347	0.21%

While Morial was able to come out with more votes than Faucheux in the primary, four years of declining popularity meant that Morial received only about 15% of the white vote, compared with the 29% he received in the election of 1977. Morial received 90% of the black vote, while Faucheux was only able to get 1% of the black vote. Jefferson received about 7% support from both white and black voters.

Runoff, March 20

Candidate	Votes received	Percentage
Ernest Morial (incumbent)	100,703	53.2%
Ron Faucheux	88,583	46.8%

Morial was aided in the runoff by a concerted effort to bring out the black vote, using the slogan "Keep the Drive Alive." Black voters turned out in significantly higher proportion compared to their white counterparts; many black leaders framed the election as a chance to cement the political gains won by the civil rights movement and by the subsequent election of Morial to his first term.

Faucheux's endorsement by former mayor Moon Landrieu had little impact on the election, coming only three days before the runoff. According to the Times-Picayune's post-election analysis, Morial won by "holding a significant white crossover vote while increasing the black turnout and denying any of it to Faucheux."

== Sources ==
- Board of Supervisors of Elections for the Parish of Orleans. Election Returns of Orleans Parish, 1982.
- New Orleans Times-Picayune. "Morial, Faucheux are in runoff." February 7, 1982.
- New Orleans Times-Picayune. "Mayor Morial wins second term." March 21, 1982.
- New Orleans Times-Picayune. "Black voters made difference for Morial." March 22, 1982.

Preceded by 1977 mayoral election	New Orleans mayoral elections	Succeeded by 1986 mayoral election
