= Copelin =

Copelin is a surname. Notable people with the surname include:

- Campbell Copelin (1902–1988), English actor
- Chad Copelin, American producer, audio engineer, musician, and songwriter
- Sherman Copelin (born 1943), American politician and businessman
