= Sybil Haydel Morial =

American civil rights activist and educator

- Born: November 26, 1932; Gert Town, New Orleans
- Died: September 3, 2024 (aged 91); New Orleans, Louisiana
- Education: Boston University
- Occupation: Educator
- Spouse: Ernest Morial
- Children: Marc Morial

Sybil Haydel Morial (November 26, 1932 – September 3, 2024) was an American civil rights activist and educator. She was married to Ernest Morial, the first Black mayor of New Orleans and was the mother of Marc Morial, who served as Mayor of New Orleans from 1994 to 2002.

== Early life and education ==
Morial was born on November 26, 1932, in Gert Town, New Orleans. Her father was a surgeon who studied at Howard University and her mother was a teacher.

Morial attended Xavier University Preparatory School. While in high school, she went to the prom with future Atlanta mayor Andrew Young. She earned her bachelor's degree in education from Boston University in 1952. While at Boston, she was a roommate with Liberian writer Izetta Roberts and met Martin Luther King Jr., who inspired her to become more involved with the civil rights movement. She returned to New Orleans and applied to the masters program at Tulane University, but was told by a dean that “we cannot accept you because Tulane does not admit Negroes.” She returned to Boston University, earning her master's degree in education in 1955.

== Career ==
Morial began her career teaching in Newton, Massachusetts, but returned to teach in New Orleans after school segregation was struck down by Brown v. Board of Education. In 1961, she was turned down from the League of Women Voters due to her race, prompting her to form the Louisiana League of Good Government to promote Black voting rights. Morial taught at the Orleans Parish school system from 1959 to 1971. In 1963, she successfully brought a lawsuit against the state of Louisiana which prohibited teachers from advocating for racial integration. In 1977, she became the director of the Special Services Program at Xavier University, working there until her retirement in 2005.

In 2015, Morial published her memoir, Witness to Change: From Jim Crow to Political Empowerment, describing growing up during segregation. She has also worked with the International Women’s Forum and championed an exhibit focused on African Americans at the 1984 Worlds Fair, which was held in New Orleans.

== Personal life ==
Morial was married to Ernest Morial, the first Black mayor of New Orleans. Community leaders encouraged her to run for mayor herself, but she deferred. Their son, Marc Morial, also served as mayor of New Orleans from 1994 to 2002. Morial was first cousin's to civil rights activist and former politician Curtis Graves.

Morial died on September 3, 2024.
