= 1946 New Orleans mayoral election =

New Orleans mayoral election, 1946
- January 22, 1946
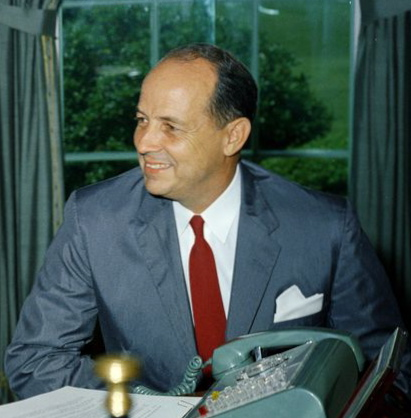

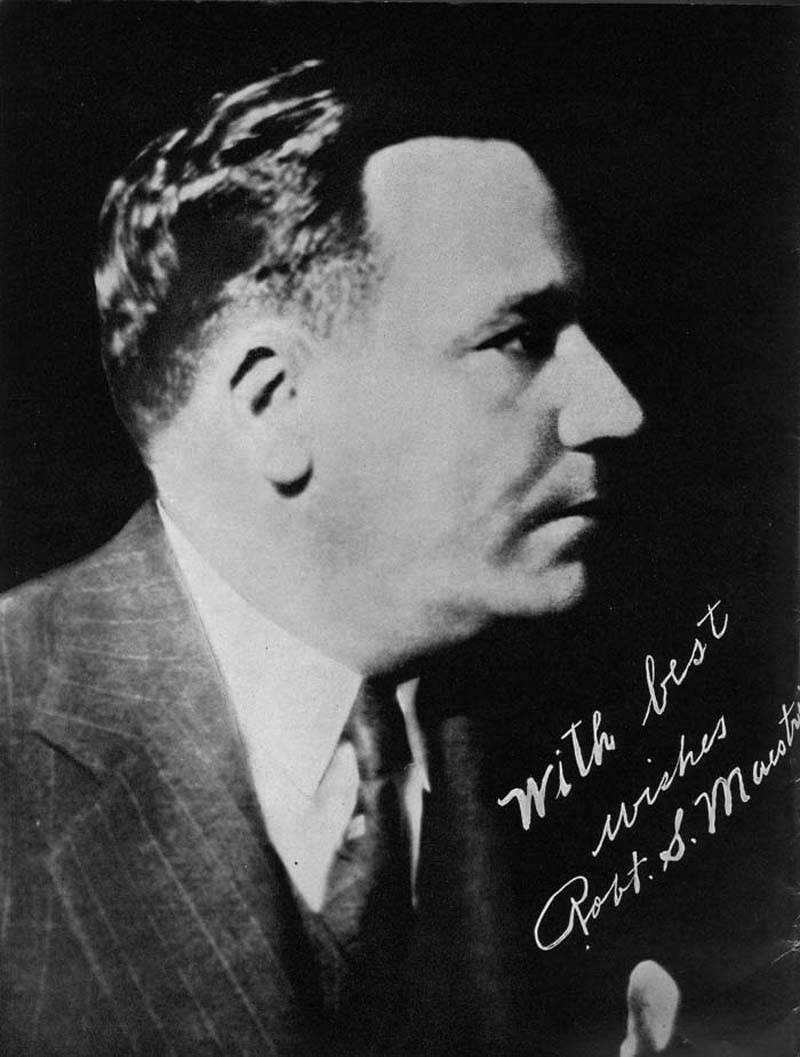
Candidate	deLesseps Morrison	Robert Maestri
Party	Democratic	Democratic
Popular vote	67,160	63,273
Mayor before election
Robert Maestri
Democratic
Elected mayor
deLesseps Morrison
Democratic

The New Orleans mayoral election of 1946 was held on January 22, 1946. It resulted in the defeat of incumbent mayor Robert Maestri and the election of deLesseps Morrison as Mayor of New Orleans.

== Background ==
Like most Southern states between Reconstruction and the civil rights era, Louisiana's Republican Party was virtually nonexistent in terms of electoral support. This meant that the city's Democratic primary was the real contest for mayor.

Despite his initial popularity, by 1946 incumbent mayor Robert Maestri had developed a reputation for corruption and ineffectual governance. He used his political machine, the Regular Democratic Organization, to dispense patronage and to dominate the city's electoral process.

== The Campaign ==
A reform candidate, Shirley G. Wimberly, had already run unsuccessfully against Ryan Bernard in the election of 1942. This time, Wimberly announced his candidacy in June 1945 and began charging that Maestri ran an inefficient government with high taxes and a compliant commission council which contributed to the city's economic stagnation. He called for registration of new voters in order to break the hold of machine politics. However, Wimberly ran as an independent and had no significant backing.

The Independent Citizens Committee, a group of Uptown reformers, began their own search for a candidate who could challenge Maestri and his Old Regulars on a platform of good government and economic development. They chose former Congressman Joachim O. Fernandez, the city's collector of internal revenue. Though he had been the local Ninth Ward boss of Huey Long's machine, Fernandez began to campaign on a reform platform. But on December 2, 1945, Fernandez abruptly withdrew from the race after making a deal with Maestri, who offered to pay off his campaign expenses. The reform coalition began a desperate search for a replacement candidate, and only six days later emerged with Colonel deLesseps Morrison, a returning Army veteran and state representative for the city's Twelfth Ward who was allied with former reform governor Sam H. Jones.

Morrison began his campaign with critiques of the corruption, gangsterism and dictatorship of the Maestri administration. His platform was similar to Wimberly's, but the young and enthusiastic Morrison was a much more dynamic campaigner and had the full support of the city's reform coalition. He augmented his support by allying with women's groups and by forming the Morrison Veterans Organization, which allowed to build support beyond the reformers' traditional Uptown base. His frequent public appearances were a novelty for New Orleanians used to politicians who relied on political machines instead of courting public opinion. Morrison was endorsed by the city's newspapers, which aided his campaign by emphasizing the deficiencies of the Maestri administration in their articles. Meanwhile, Maestri made only perfunctory attempts at campaigning. He rarely made public appearances, instead sending representatives to events attended by the other candidates.

Despite his image as a clean reformer, Morrison called for legalized gambling as a way to control vice, and he accepted campaign donations by underworld figure Henry Muller. Morrison was alleged to have attended an election-eve meeting with underworld leaders where he promised to allow prostitution and bookmaking to continue.

== Results ==
Candidate	Votes received
deLesseps Morrison	67,160
Robert Maestri (incumbent)	63,273
Shirley Wimberly	1,888

Four minor candidates - Anthony Deckelmann, Mrs. Louis Dillon, John Golden, and Warren Johnson - received 1387 votes between them. No runoff was necessary. The 1946 election was the last time an incumbent mayor of New Orleans was defeated in the polls.

== Significance of the election ==
The 1946 election saw the emergence of new groups of voters - most notably women, veterans, and members of a newly professionalized civil service - who were not subject to the patronage of the Old Regulars and who thus operated outside the city's traditional machine politics. The Regular Democratic Organization continued to have political power into the 1950s and 1960s, but its monopoly over the city's politics was broken after Morrison's victory.

== Sources ==
- "Morrison beats Maestri: Mayor trails independent." The Times-Picayune, January 23, 1946
- Haas, Edward F. DeLesseps S. Morrison and the Image of Reform: New Orleans Politics, 1946–1961. LSU Press, 1974.

Preceded by 1942 mayoral election	New Orleans mayoral elections	Succeeded by 1950 mayoral election
