= John Caspar Dreier =

American diplomat and teacher

3rd United States Ambassador to the Organization of American States
- In office January 2, 1951 – November 12, 1960
- President: Harry S. Truman; Dwight Eisenhower
- Preceded by: Paul C. Daniels
- Succeeded by: deLesseps S. Morrison

Personal details
- Born: December 27, 1906 Brooklyn, New York City, U.S.
- Died: March 10, 1994 (aged 87) Cambridge, Massachusetts, U.S.
- Spouse: Louisa R. Dreier
- Children: 3
- Education: Harvard College
- Occupation: Teacher, diplomat

John Caspar Dreier (December 27, 1906 – March 10, 1994) was an American diplomat and teacher.

He served as United States Ambassador to the Organization of American States (OAS) between 1951 and 1960. He then taught for a number of years at the School of Advanced International Studies (part of Johns Hopkins University in Washington, D.C.).

== Biography ==
Born in Brooklyn, New York City, Dreier attended Harvard College. He began working for the Department of State in 1941. In this role, he witnessed the Bogotazo riots in Bogotá, Colombia in 1948. Appointed to be Ambassador to the OAS by President Harry S. Truman, he served from January 2, 1951 until November 12, 1960. Dreier primarily saw the OAS as a way to limit the spread of communism in Latin America during the Cold War, with his tenure including events such as the 1954 Guatemalan coup d'état and the Cuban Revolution. Furthermore, he believed that the OAS needed to address social and economic concerns in order to succeed.

Dreier retired in 1972. After retirement, he played an active role as a teacher and trustee of the College of the Atlantic in Bar Harbor, Maine, and was involved in conservation projects. Two annual scholarships exist at the College in honor of him and his wife.

=== Personal life ===
Dreier was married to Louisa Cabot Richardson Dreier for 51 years and had three children. He died in Cambridge, Massachusetts of complications resulting from congestive heart failure.

== Publications ==
- Organization of American States and the Hemisphere Crisis (Harper & Row, 1962)
- The Alliance for Progress: Problems and Perspectives (Editor) (Johns Hopkins University Press, 1962)
- International Organization in the Western Hemisphere (Co-author) (Syracuse University Press, 1968).
