= 1958 New Orleans mayoral election =

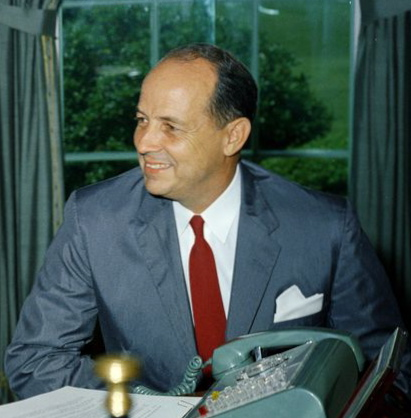

Candidate	deLesseps Morrison	Claude W. Duke
Party	Democratic	Democratic
Popular vote	90,802	43,231
Percentage	57.7%	27.5%
Mayor before election
deLesseps Morrison
Democratic
Elected mayor
deLesseps Morrison
Democratic

The New Orleans mayoral election of 1958, held in February, resulted in the re-election of deLesseps Morrison to his fourth consecutive term as mayor of New Orleans. Morrison was able to defeat the Regular Democratic Organization candidate - former State Representative Claude W. Duke - soundly, winning 90,802 of the 157,320 votes cast in the election compared to Duke's 43,231 votes. State Representative Fred C. Donaldson ran a distant third with 18,999 votes; no runoff was required. Morrison had proven able to consistently defeat the once powerful RDO machine, but since mayors were only allowed two consecutive terms under the new city charter of 1954, this would be Morrison's last term in office.

Candidate	Votes received
deLesseps Morrison (incumbent)	90,802
Claude W. Duke	43,231
Fred C. Donaldson	18,999
Leonard Gunsberg	2,938
Addison Roswell Thompson	683
William Attaway	667

== Sources ==
- Haas, Edward F. DeLesseps S. Morrison and the Image of Reform: New Orleans Politics, 1946-1961. LSU Press, 1974.
- Parker, Joseph B. The Morrison Era: Reform Politics in New Orleans. Pelican, 1974.
