= Curtis Graves =

American politician and activist (1938–2023)

Member of the Texas House of Representatives from District 23-6
- In office January 10, 1967 – January 9, 1973

Personal details
- Born: August 26, 1938 New Orleans, Louisiana, U.S.
- Died: July 26, 2023 (aged 84) Tucker, Georgia, U.S.
- Party: Democratic
- Spouse(s): Kay Bryant; Joanne Graves (divorced)
- Children: 3, including Gizelle Bryant
- Education: Texas Southern University (B.A.); Princeton University (M.S.)

Curtis M. Graves (August 26, 1938 – July 26, 2023) was an American civil rights activist and politician in the state of Texas. He was one of the first African Americans to serve in the Texas House of Representatives since the Reconstruction.

== Early life ==
Curtis Matthew Graves was born in New Orleans, Louisiana on August 26, 1938, to Fregelio Joseph Graves and Mable Haydel Graves. He grew up in a creole family, his father and uncle owned Butsy and Buddy's, the only black-owned Esso stations in Louisiana at the time.

Graves attended Xavier University, before transferring to Texas Southern University, where he joined Kappa Alpha Psi and graduated in 1963 with a degree in business administration. Graves participated in sit-ins, marches, and helped found the Progressive Youth Association which played a major role in the desegregation of Houston.

== Career ==
Graves was a member of the Texas House of Representatives from 1967 to 1973 as a Democrat. Along with Barbara Jordan and Joe Lockridge, he was one of three African-American members elected in 1966, the first ones since 1896. Graves was a major force in the Civil Rights Movement during which he worked with Dr. Martin Luther King Jr.

A businessman, he was an alumnus of Texas Southern University and Princeton University. He also worked for NASA's academic affairs division and as Director for Civil Affairs. Graves was an artistic photographer.

== Personal life ==
Curtis Graves was married to Joanne Graves, with whom he had three children. One of his children is Gizelle Bryant, star of The Real Housewives of Potomac and former wife of megachurch pastor Jamal Bryant.

Graves was married to Kay Bryant and resided in Atlanta, Georgia.

Graves through his mother side was cousin's to Sybil Haydel Morial and her son former mayor of New Orleans Marc Morial.

Curtis Graves died on July 26, 2023, at the age of 84.
