= 1998 New Orleans mayoral election =

1998 New Orleans Mayoral Election
- February 7, 1998
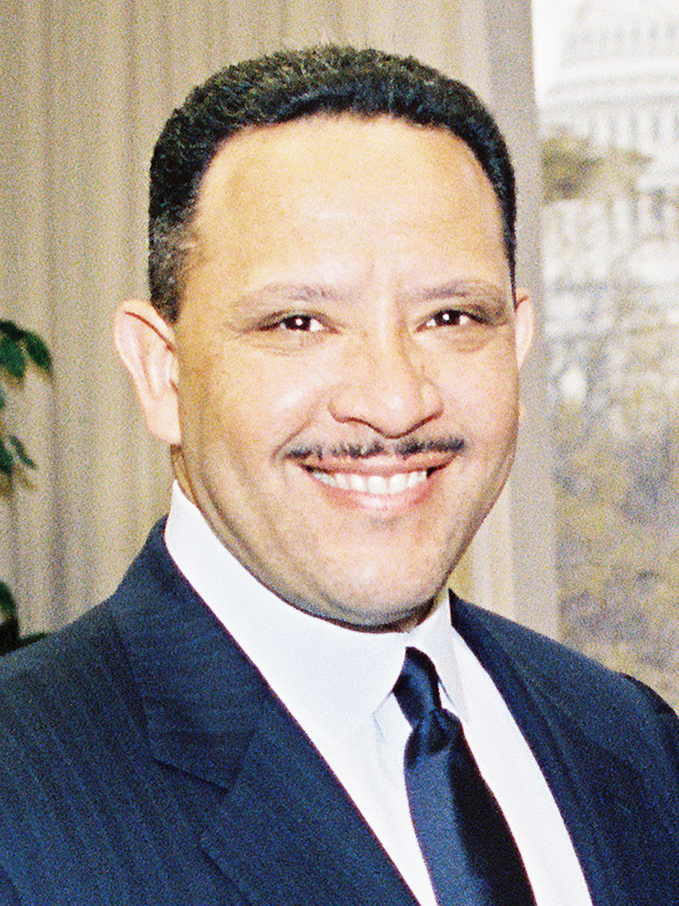

Candidate	Marc Morial	Kathleen Cresson
Party	Democratic	Democratic
Popular vote	92,378	22,767
Percentage	79.27%	19.54%

The New Orleans mayoral election of 1998 was held on February 7, 1998, and resulted in the reelection of incumbent Marc Morial to a second term as Mayor of New Orleans.

Elections in Louisiana—with the exception of U.S. presidential elections—follow a variation of the open primary system. Candidates of any and all parties are listed on one ballot; voters need not limit themselves to the candidates of one party. Unless one candidate takes more than 50% of the vote in the first round, a run-off election is then held between the top two candidates, who may in fact be members of the same party. In this election, no run-off was needed as Morial won over 50% of the vote in the first round.

Results
Party	Candidate	Votes	%
Democratic	Marc H. Morial (incumbent)	92,378	79.27
Democratic	Kathleen Cresson	22,767	19.54
Other	Paul D. Borello	1,398	1.2
Total votes		116,543	

Marc Morial won an easy re-election, with the widest margin of victory in a New Orleans election in several decades. Neither of his opponents - lawyer Kathleen Cresson and arts store manager Paul Borrello - were particularly well-known. With the re-election of the popular Morial widely seen as a foregone conclusion months before election day, the race met with unusual apathy among the city's media and electorate. Debates were not televised, no polls were commissioned, and only 41% of New Orleans electors bothered to vote.

== Sources ==
- Louisiana Secretary of State Elections Division. Official Election Results Database
- The Times Picayune. "Morial a winner where he once lost; support crosses racial bounds." February 12, 1998.
- The Times Picayune. "Mayor's margin widest since 1961." February 8, 1998.

Preceded by 1994 mayoral election	New Orleans mayoral elections	Succeeded by 2002 mayoral election
