= Arnold R. Hirsch =

American historian

Arnold Richard Hirsch (March 9, 1949 – March 19, 2018) was an American historian who taught at the University of New Orleans, where he served as Ethel and Herman L. Midlo Endowed Chair for New Orleans Studies.

Hirsch was born on March 9, 1949, and raised in Rogers Park, Chicago. His father Nathan died when Hirsch was 13, after which his mother Mollie started working at a bank. Hirsch attended Sullivan High School, then earned undergraduate and advanced degrees in history from the University of Illinois at Chicago. His graduate advisor was Gilbert Osofsky. He began teaching at the University of New Orleans in 1978. Hirsch published Making the Second Ghetto: Race and Housing in Chicago, 1940-1960. The book linked urban renewal in his hometown to racial segregation, and was partly inspired by the riots that took place after the assassination of Martin Luther King Jr. on April 4, 1968. Hirsch retired in 2013, and moved back to Chicago, settling in Oak Park. He died on March 19, 2018, of Lewy body dementia, aged 69.
