= Nat G. Kiefer =

American politician (1939–1985)

Ignatz "Nat" Gerard Kiefer, Sr.

Louisiana State Senator for Orleans Parish
- In office 1970 – July 10, 1985
- Preceded by: Angus D. Smith
- Succeeded by: Jon D. Johnson

Louisiana State Representative for District 26 (Orleans Parish)
- In office 1968–1970
- Succeeded by: James Sutterfield

Personal details
- Born: February 26, 1939 New Orleans, Louisiana, US
- Died: July 10, 1985 (aged 46) Los Angeles, California, US
- Party: Democratic
- Spouse: Carol Ann Hazard Kiefer
- Children: Nat G. Kiefer, Jr. Kent Christopher Kiefer; Karen Ann Kiefer Kris Patrick Kiefer
- Education: Tulane Law School
- Profession: Attorney at law

Ignatz Gerard Kiefer, known as Nat G. Kiefer, Sr., (February 26, 1939 – July 10, 1985) was an attorney from his native New Orleans, Louisiana, who served in both houses of the Louisiana State Legislature. He was a state representative from 1968 to 1970, and thereafter until his death in office fifteen years later a state senator.

== Biography ==
Kiefer ran unsuccessfully for Mayor of New Orleans in 1977, finishing third in the jungle primary by 242 votes to Councilman Joseph V. DiRosa, or less than a half a vote per precinct. DiRosa lost the runoff (general election) to Louisiana Court of Appeals Judge Ernest Morial, who became New Orleans' first black mayor.

== Family ==
Kiefer married Carol Ann Hazard (born June 18, 1940); the couple had four children, Nat Gerard Kiefer, Jr., Kent Christopher Kiefer (1962-2021), Karen Anne Kiefer (1961-2025), and Kris Patrick Kiefer.

=== Death ===
Kiefer died at the age of forty-six of a liver ailment at the University of California, Los Angeles Medical Center.

In 1987, the UNO Lakefront Arena was officially renamed the "Senator Nat G. Kiefer University of New Orleans Lakefront Arena".

Preceded by Angus D. "A. D." Smith	Louisiana State Senator for Orleans Parish; Ignatz "Nat" Gerard Kiefer; 1970–1985	Succeeded by Jon D. Johnson
Preceded by Prior to single-member districting	Louisiana State Representative for District 26 (Orleans Parish); Ignatz "Nat" Gerard Kiefer; 1968–1970	Succeeded by James Sutterfield
