= 1969–70 New Orleans mayoral election =

New Orleans mayoral election, 1969–1970
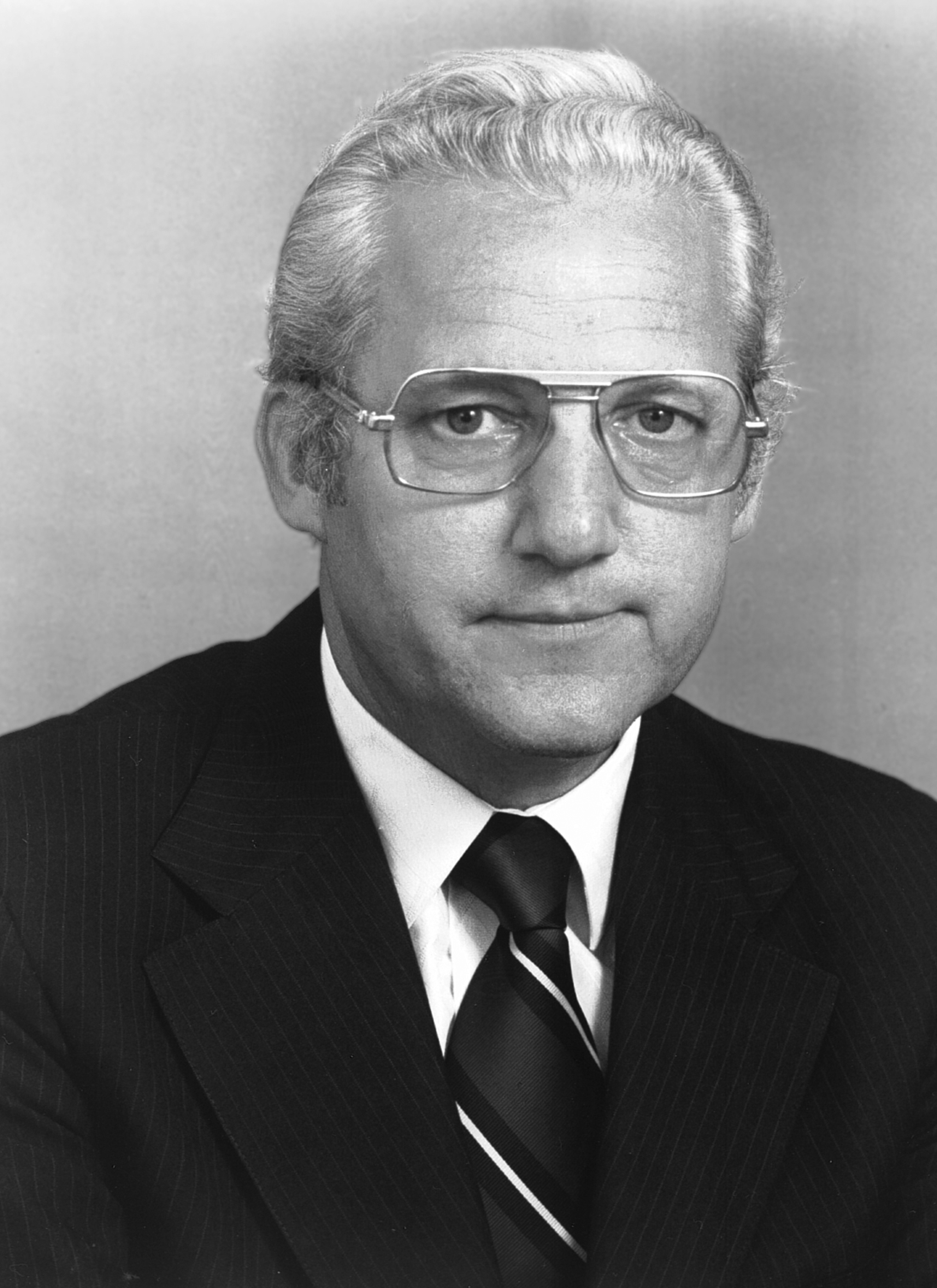

Candidate	Moon Landrieu	Ben Toledano
Party	Democratic	Republican
Popular vote	94,332	65,558
Percentage	59.0%	41.0%
Mayor before election
Victor H. Schiro
Democratic
Elected mayor
Moon Landrieu
Democratic

The New Orleans mayoral election of 1969-1970 resulted in the election of Moon Landrieu as mayor of New Orleans. This election also saw an unexpectedly strong showing for a Republican candidate; the party had previously had negligible support in the city.

Incumbent mayor Victor H. Schiro was term-limited after winning elections in 1961 and 1965.

== Candidates ==
Major candidates in the Democratic primary included:

- former State Representative and City Councilman-at-Large Moon Landrieu,
- Jimmy Fitzmorris, former City Councillor from 1954 to 1966
- future Louisiana Attorney General and current State Senator William J. Guste
- City Councillor-at-Large John J. Petre had previously been a state legislator.
- Judge David Gertler was well financed and had strong support from the city's Jewish community
- Orleans Parish School Board President Lloyd J. Rittiner

== Results ==
First Democratic Party Primary, November 8, 1969

Candidate	Votes received	Percent
Jimmy Fitzmorris	59,301	34.53%
Moon Landrieu	33,093	19.27%
William J. Guste	29,487	17.17%
John J. Petre	22,471	13.08%
David Gertler	20,572	11.98%
Lloyd J. Rittiner	2,678	1.56%
John J. Spann, Jr.	1,707	0.99%
Addison Roswell Thompson	1,248	0.73%
Dan G. Dial	470	0.27%
Rodney Fertel (former husband of restaurateur Ruth Fertel)	310	0.18%
Maurice Charles Sciortino	201	0.12%
Cecilia M. Pizzo	198	0.12%

Second Democratic Party Primary, December 13, 1969

Candidate	Votes received	Percent
Moon Landrieu	89,554	53.86%
Jimmy Fitzmorris	76,726	46.14%

General Election, 1970

Candidate	Party	Votes received	Percent
Moon Landrieu	Democrat	94,332	59.0%
Ben C. Toledano	Republican	65,558	41.0%

== Sources ==
- Orleans Parish Democratic Executive Committee. First and Second Democratic Primary Elections, 1969.
- Fitzmorris, James E. Frankly, Fitz! Pelican, 1992.
