= DeLesseps Story Morrison =

American politician (1912–1964)

deLesseps Story Morrison
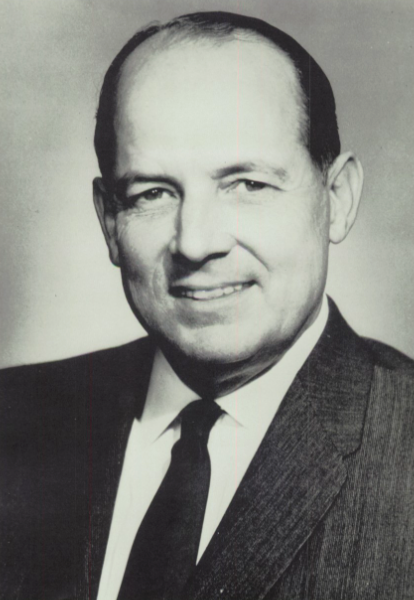

4th United States Ambassador to the Organization of American States
- In office July 17, 1961 – July 1963
- President: John F. Kennedy
- Preceded by: John C. Dreier
- Succeeded by: Ellsworth Bunker

54th Mayor of New Orleans
- In office April 4, 1946 – July 17, 1961
- Preceded by: Robert Maestri
- Succeeded by: Victor H. Schiro

21st President of the National League of Cities
- In office 1949
- Preceded by: Fletcher Bowron
- Succeeded by: J. Quigg Newton

Member of the Louisiana House of Representatives from the Orleans Parish (Ward 12)
- In office May 13, 1940 – May 13, 1946
- Preceded by: James A. Lindsay
- Succeeded by: Joseph L. Piazza

Personal details
- Born: deLesseps Story Morrison; January 18, 1912 New Roads, Louisiana, U.S.
- Died: May 22, 1964 (aged 52) Ciudad Victoria, Mexico
- Party: Democratic
- Spouse: Corinne Waterman Morrison (m. 1942; died 1959)
- Children: 3 (including deLesseps Jr.)
- Education: Louisiana State University (BA, LLB)
- Nickname: Chep Morrison

Military service
- Allegiance: United States
- Branch/service: United States Army
- Years of service: 1941–1946 (active); 1933–1941, 1946–1964 (reserve)
- Rank: Major General
- Unit: Transportation Corps
- Battles/wars: World War II

deLesseps Story "Chep" Morrison Sr. (January 18, 1912 – May 22, 1964), was an American attorney and politician who was the 54th mayor of New Orleans, Louisiana, from 1946 to 1961. He then served as an appointee of U.S. President John F. Kennedy as the United States ambassador to the Organization of American States between 1961 and 1963.

The population of New Orleans peaked during Morrison's mayoralty, when the 1960 Census recorded 627,525 inhabitants, a 10 percent increase from 1950. Morrison ran three primary campaigns for the Louisiana Democratic gubernatorial nomination, but was unsuccessful.

== Early life and education ==
Morrison was born to Jacob Haight Morrison, II (1875–1929), a district attorney in Pointe Coupee Parish, and his wife, the former Anita Olivier, a New Orleans socialite, in New Roads, the Pointe Coupee parish seat of government. He was named after deLesseps Story, a respected New Orleans judge to whom he was related on his mother's side; the family was related to Ferdinand de Lesseps and Sidney Story, an alderman for whom the New Orleans area of Storyville was named. Morrison spoke French fluently.

In 1932, Morrison graduated from Louisiana State University in Baton Rouge. In 1934, he completed his law degree from the Louisiana State University Law Center.

== Law and political career ==
Morrison moved to New Orleans, where he became an attorney with the New Deal agency, the National Recovery Administration. Thereafter, he became a law partner with his brother Jacob Morrison and Thomas Hale Boggs Sr., a future Democratic U.S. Representative and House Majority Leader.

== Marriage and family ==
In 1942, Morrison married Corinne Waterman of New Orleans. They had three children together. Their oldest son, deLesseps Story Morrison Jr., known as "Toni", became a politician like his father and was a Louisiana state representative from 1974 to 1980.

== Military service ==
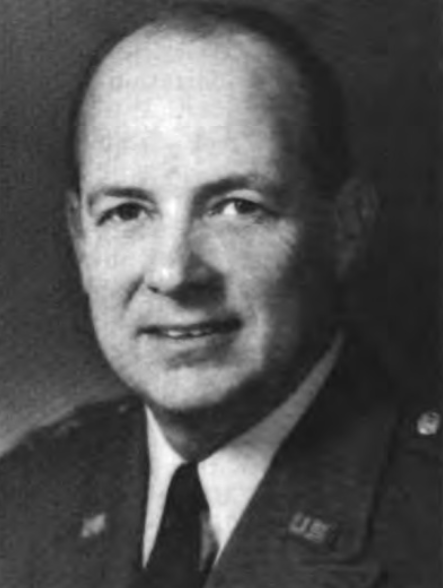
Morrison as a Major General in the Army Reserve.

After graduation from college he was commissioned in the Army Reserve as a Second Lieutenant in 1933. During World War II, Morrison left the state legislature to join the United States Army. He was promoted to the rank of colonel, and became chief of staff of the occupation forces stationed in the city of Bremen, Germany. He received the Bronze Star, the Legion of Merit and also served in England, France, and Belgium. In 1944, both he and Bill Dodd were reelected to the legislature in absentia by their constituents. He served on active duty from 1941 to 1946. He was also decorated with the Legion of Honour and the Belgian Order of Leopold.

After the war, Morrison returned to New Orleans to practice law. Continuing with the U.S. Army Reserve in 1946, he attained the rank of Major General. His reserve career included serving as the commanding general of the 377th Transportation Command and later Deputy Chief of the Transportation Corps within the United States Department of the Army.

== Election as mayor ==
Morrison was approached by a group of Uptown reformers in December 1945 to run for mayor in the election of 1946. The attractive and dynamic young veteran ran a campaign emphasizing the need to clean up the corruption of incumbent Mayor Robert Maestri, who had been affiliated with Huey Long and the Earl Long faction of Louisiana Democratic politics. Maestri's Old Regulars had dominated New Orleans for decades. Morrison pulled a major upset when he defeated Maestri in the first primary. Historian Pamela Tyler notes that outside of New Orleans Morrison's surprise victory was attributed to the role of women. The International Women's Organization, (IWO) under the leadership of July Breazeale Waters (1895–1989), registered voters, became poll watchers, canvassed, distributed literature and signs and got out the vote on election day on behalf of Morrison. One notable event planned by women that moved the electorate was the "March of Brooms" whose theme was, "A Clean Sweep with Morrison." The IWO and the Broom Brigade were key to Morrison's victory, with the Christian Science Monitor stating, "The women of New Orleans elected deLesseps S. Morrison." He was among many returning World War II veterans to gain political office during that period.

== Morrison as mayor ==
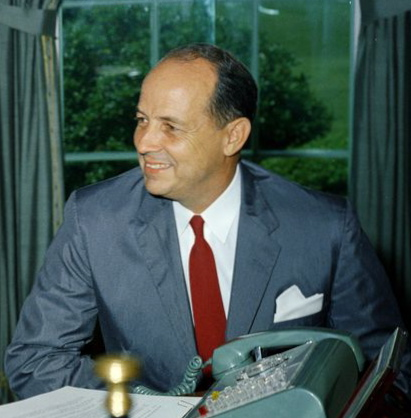
Morrison in 1961.

As mayor, Morrison put together a strong public relations team, which helped him cultivate an image as a dynamic reformer and of the city as a progressive one. He gained widespread praise in the national press. A later 1993 survey of historians, political scientists and urban experts conducted by Melvin G. Holli of the University of Illinois at Chicago ranked Morrison as the sixteenth-best American big-city mayor to have served between the years 1820 and 1993.

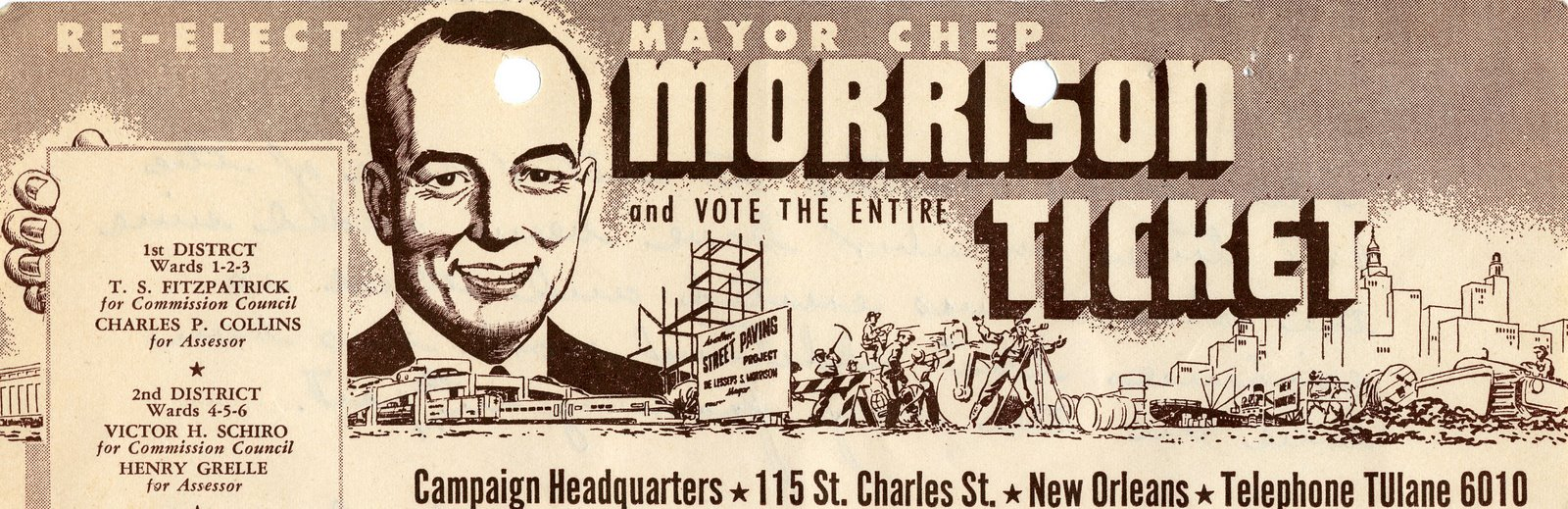
Morrison's letterhead during his 1950 re-election campaign

Morrison marketed the city effectively, and was instrumental in creating the post-World War II image of New Orleans as a growing and progressive Sun Belt metropolis. His administration attracted significant private investment and welcomed the establishment of numerous oil industry and white-collar corporate offices in downtown New Orleans, as well as several sizable new industrial plants elsewhere. To emphasize his differences from his predecessor, whom he had characterized as dictatorial, Morrison worked to get a law passed to reduce the powers of the mayor. He created a new city planning commission and moved to make administration more efficient by firing many of Maestri's patronage appointments (though some were replaced with Morrison's own supporters).

Morrison downsized city operations by selling off most of the city's public markets. Most were torn down, which was regretted later as costing the city valuable community centers. He addressed a housing crisis by building veterans' housing operated by the Housing Authority of New Orleans, and engaged in more large-scale urban renewal than any other New Orleans mayor. Morrison's administration demolished low-income neighborhoods to build new or expand existing public housing projects, expropriated private property to construct the New Orleans Civic Center, the New Orleans Union Passenger Terminal, and several street-widening projects in the city's downtown.

One of his most popular acts was to create the New Orleans Recreation Department (NORD), which included segregated facilities for whites and blacks (all public facilities were segregated in those years). He began an extensive citywide street improvement program financed though a bond issue, and located funding sufficient to construct numerous street overpasses and underpasses, eliminating most at-grade railway crossings within the city limits. Morrison acquiesced in New Orleans Public Service's dismantling of the city's extensive streetcar network in the 1950s.

A proponent of increased international trade, Morrison lent his support to the construction of the International Trade Mart, a precursor to the city's World Trade Center. He traveled extensively in Latin America to promote trade with New Orleans. He became friends with dictators Rafael Trujillo and Juan Perón. Morrison's wish to reinforce ties with Latin America was expressed in such urban renewal projects as having new central area circulators embellished with monuments to Central and South American historical figures. The widened Basin Street was, from 1957, developed as the Garden of the Americas and outfitted with monuments to Simón Bolívar, Benito Juárez, and Francisco Morazán. A statue of Bolívar was prominently sited at the corner of Canal and Basin streets, and a new circulator in Central City was renamed Simon Bolivar Avenue. Morrison endorsed the Information Council of the Americas (INCA), an anti-communist organization, at the behest of its founder Edward S. Butler in order to boost its membership. He called on citizens to support INCA "with vigor".

In 1949, Morrison served as president of the National League of Cities.

Despite running on a platform stressing the elimination of the Old Regular machine, after his election Morrison quickly built his own political organization, the Crescent City Democratic Association. The CCDA began finding its supporters jobs in City Hall and in municipal construction contracts. In October 1946, Morrison broke a garbage collectors' strike by organizing volunteer scab labor to take over the duties of the strikers. Morrison's organization's power quickly eclipsed that of the Old Regulars, and he secured easy re-elections in 1950, 1954, and 1958.

Morrison pushed for a new city charter in 1954, which replaced the at-large council commission system with a legislative city council combining five district-based and two at-large members. The "strong mayor" system of municipal government established by the 1954 charter still operates in New Orleans. The charter limited the mayor to two consecutive four-year terms, but did not apply to Morrison, who was exempted by a grandfather clause.

=== Morrison, crime, and the NOPD ===
After assuming office in 1946, Morrison appointed Adair Watters superintendent of the New Orleans Police Department (NOPD) in an effort to eliminate corruption. But tensions developed when Watters moved to suppress gambling, prostitution, and other vice too zealously for Morrison's liking. Watters resigned in February 1949 because of Morrison's political interference with NOPD activities. Throughout most of the 1950s, scandals continued to be revealed concerning the involvement of the NOPD in graft and vice. In 1952, the Metropolitan Crime Commission of New Orleans was established as an independent monitor of the NOPD and the Morrison administration's approach to vice. State Police Colonel Francis Grevemberg, later a two-time gubernatorial candidate, led a series of high-profile raids on New Orleans gambling establishments that embarrassed Morrison and the NOPD for its inactivity. Eventually, retired FBI Agent Aaron M. Kohn was sent from Chicago to investigate NOPD involvement in vice. Kohn later recalled:

After about a year, I began to realize something about the system down here. In Chicago, people were generally on one side of the fence or the other—honest or crooked. But in Louisiana, there just isn't any fence."

He soon complained that Morrison was obstructing his efforts. In 1955, Morrison forced the mayor to ask for the resignation of Joseph Schuering, the NOPD superintendent implicated in the scandals.

=== Morrison and race ===
Early in his administration, Morrison supported the construction of a suburban-style black neighborhood named Pontchartrain Park, built public housing for low-income blacks, and spent money on street and infrastructure improvements in black neighborhoods. NORD built playgrounds, swimming pools, and recreational centers for African Americans. These actions earned him the enmity of hard-line segregationists. In 1950, he oversaw the NOPD's hiring of its first black policeman since the advent of the Jim Crow era in the late 19th century. These measures aside, Morrison remained committed to segregation and was known to use racial slurs in private conversations. The facilities he built in black neighborhoods were segregated and received inferior funding compared to civic projects in white neighborhoods. Historian Adam Fairclough interprets Morrison's building programs for blacks as a way of "shoring up segregation" by defusing dissatisfaction with inferior facilities. Many black leaders found him sympathetic but unwilling to take more meaningful action to address their concerns. Morrison's approach to race relations increasingly fell behind the times as the Civil Rights Movement gained momentum.

In his 1959 gubernatorial runoff contest, Morrison proclaimed his support for segregation and noted that New Orleans was at that time the least racially mixed of the large southern cities. He boasted that he had been sued by the NAACP over his segregationist policies in the city.

New Orleans gained national attention in the fall of 1960 during the New Orleans school desegregation crisis as the city's school board implemented a federal integration order for its public schools. Four black students entered two white schools, McDonogh No. 19 Elementary School and William Frantz Elementary School, in the city's Ninth Ward, but were greeted outside with mobs of white women and youths screaming racial slurs and throwing bottles and refuse. While Morrison did not join Governor Jimmie Davis' drive to prevent integration by shutting the schools down, he did nothing to prevent the intimidating segregationist demonstrations. The NOPD passively stood by while mobs heckled parents bringing their children to school, but at the same time, police arrested civil rights activists holding lunch counter sit-ins in the city. Morrison's lack of action stemmed from his political need to avoid alienating black supporters while publicly retaining a segregationist stance to satisfy whites. His position resulted in criticism from both sides; black New Orleanians and supporters of civil rights felt he had betrayed them, while hard-line segregationists accused him of supporting integration. Ultimately, his fence-straddling on civil rights contributed significantly to the fatigue and disenchantment with which the citizenry received his administration's actions in its final years – a sharp contrast with the comparatively ebullient 1950s. Morrison's leadership failures on civil rights did much to compromise his earlier achievements. This resulted in New Orleans being more poorly positioned socially and economically for the post-Civil Rights era than its (at that time) peer cities such as Atlanta, Houston, and Dallas.

=== Gubernatorial election of 1956 ===
The then-lieutenant governor, C.E. "Cap" Barham of Ruston, ran unsuccessfully with Morrison in a bid for a second term in the second-highest state office. The two proposed a "New look" for Louisiana politics. In his stump speeches, Morrison often reminded his listeners that all state programs came from taxes and not everything one might prefer could be adopted. Yet he usually mentioned projects important to local voters.

=== Gubernatorial election of 1960 ===
Other Morrison ticket candidates lost too, including George W. Shannon for Commissioner of Agriculture and Forestry, Fred Columbus Dent Sr., for register of state land, David Wallace Chennault, son of General Claire Chennault, for custodian of voting machines, Mrs. Marion Henderson of Colfax, Grant Parish for state comptroller, and R. W. "Tom" Farrar Jr., for state attorney general.

In an appearance in Shreveport, Country music star Minnie Pearl campaigned for Morrison, rather than fellow entertainer Jimmie Davis. Morrison carried the endorsement of three of the four Louisiana Teamsters Union chapters, with only the Lake Charles branch remaining neutral in the runoff election against Davis.

== Declining political fortunes ==
By his final term as mayor, Morrison's luster had faded somewhat. Some of his ideas, such as the unsuccessful 1959 proposal for a monorail, were met with widespread opposition. He moved surprisingly slowly to construct a more modern terminal for Moisant International Airport; for its first thirteen years of operation New Orleanians departed from a glorified barn, in contrast to its regional economic rivals. Morrison failed to keep the Pelicans minor league baseball team in New Orleans. The energy that had characterized his early years in office seemed thoroughly dissipated. Former political allies such as City Councilman and future Lieutenant Governor James Edward "Jimmy" Fitzmorris Jr., began to express their independence and positioned themselves for a future without Morrison. In the aftermath of the school integration crisis, Morrison's political future was uncertain. He was the first of many New Orleans mayors to try to amend the 1954 city charter to allow a third consecutive term as mayor, but did not succeed.

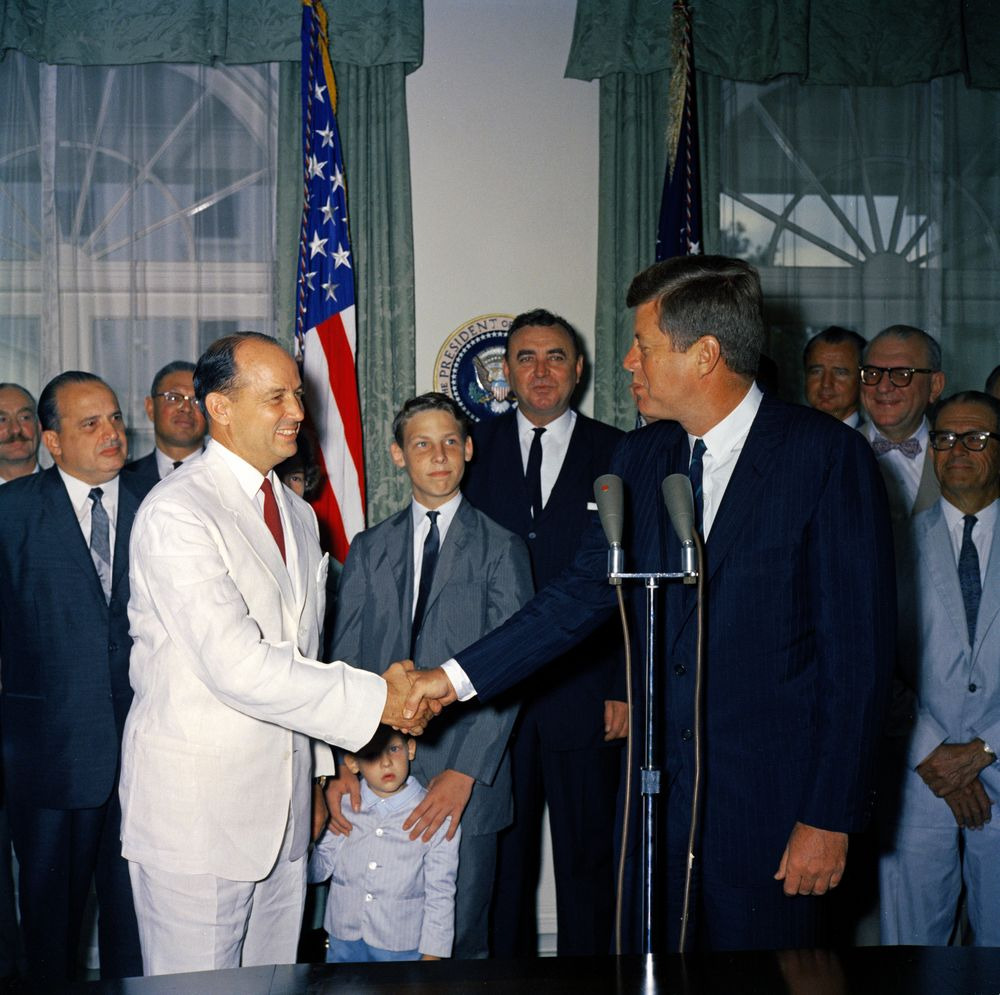
Morrison with President John F. Kennedy, 1961

Seeking a political base from which to stage another run for governor, he approached the John F. Kennedy administration and was appointed Ambassador to the Organization of American States on July 17, 1961. In a further sign of his declining political fortunes, his chosen candidate for mayor in the New Orleans election of 1962 – State Senator Adrian G. Duplantier – lost the Democratic runoff to Victor Schiro.

== Death ==
Four months after his final election defeat, Morrison and his son, Randy, died on May 22, 1964, in a plane crash in Ciudad Victoria, Mexico.

== The Morrison family ==
Morrison married Corinne Waterman on October 3, 1942. Mrs. Morrison (born August 17, 1921) died at the age of thirty-seven on February 26, 1959, just a few months before her husband launched his second gubernatorial bid. The Morrisons' seven-year-old son, John Randolph Waterman "Randy" Morrison (born September 24, 1956), died with his father in the 1964 plane crash. The Morrisons' daughter, Corinne Ann Morrison (born 1947), became an attorney and practiced in New Orleans. Their elder son, deLesseps Story Morrison Jr. (1944–1996), who like his father was elected to the state house, ran unsuccessfully for mayor in 1977. DeLesseps Jr. died of lung cancer on August 21, 1996. Both father and son died at age 52. All four Morrisons are buried at Metairie Cemetery in New Orleans.

After his wife's death, Morrison was frequently seen in the company of Hungarian-born actress Zsa Zsa Gabor, who expressed a special fondness for New Orleans, which she considered "the most European" of American cities. Jimmy Fitzmorris, later lieutenant governor of Louisiana, recalled that "The ladies loved him. Chep was sort of an outgoing personality, had a contagious smile, and was able to captivate a lot of people. Most people that met Chep couldn't help but like him." Morrison later dismissed the notion that his interest in Gabor was serious though Jimmie Davis questioned the relationship in the 1959 gubernatorial race. In 1963, Gabor wed businessman Herbert Hutner while Morrison was making his third unsuccessful run for governor a year before his own death. Gabor, who married nine times, lived until 2016.

In 1995, the senior deLesseps Morrison was inducted posthumously into the Louisiana Political Museum and Hall of Fame in Winnfield, the home base of the Longs.

== See also ==
- Timeline of New Orleans, 1940s–1960s

== Notes ==
Political offices
Preceded by Robert Maestri	Mayor of New Orleans; 1946–1961	Succeeded by Victor H. Schiro
Diplomatic posts
Preceded by John C. Dreier	United States Ambassador to the Organization of American States; 1961–1963	Succeeded by Ellsworth Bunker
