= DeLesseps Morrison Jr. =

American politician (1944–1996)

State Representative for District 88 (Orleans Parish)
- In office 1974–1980
- Preceded by: Frank A. Marullo, Jr.
- Succeeded by: E. Henry "Eddie" Heaton, Jr.

Personal details
- Born: deLesseps Story Morrison Jr. March 11, 1944 New Orleans, Louisiana
- Died: August 21, 1996 (aged 52) New Orleans, Louisiana
- Party: Democratic
- Spouse(s): Linda Morrison Newton, 1964-1981; Marianne Mason Morrison, 1985-1996 (until his death)
- Parent(s): DeLesseps Story Morrison (1912–1964); Corinne Waterman Morrison (1921–1959)
- Profession: Attorney; businessman

deLesseps Story "Toni" Morrison Jr. (March 11, 1944 – August 21, 1996) was an American lawyer and international business developer and a Democratic member of the Louisiana House of Representatives from 1974 to 1980.

== Early life ==
Toni Morrison was born in New Orleans but spent the summers of his childhood in New Roads, Louisiana, his father's stomping grounds, with his cousins from the Morrison and Claiborne families. When he was 21, he attended law school in Buenos Aires, Argentina and became fully fluent in Spanish, then returned to Louisiana State University to obtain a law degree. He traveled extensively in south America, but his favorite country was Brazil, where he met his best man at his second wedding, and who steered him to learn the production of ethanol. He wanted to hire the Brazilian company to produce his Ethanol Plant in New Iberia, LA, but the investors overruled him and hired French engineers instead, which resulted in high cost overruns. In the mid 1990s, he had a home in Guatemala City, Guatemala, where he was developing engineering projects to be built and operated in Houston and New Orleans. Also, he shared an apartment in New York city with his second wife, Marianne Mason, and they divided their time between New York, New Orleans, and then Guatemala in his later years.

== Career ==
=== Politics ===
After being elected to serve a two-year term in Washington, D.C., as president of the Young Democrats of America, Morrison won a seat in the legislature in 1974 and was elected to full terms in 1975 and again in 1979. He was also able to negotiate free tuition for all foreign national teachers working in Louisiana sponsored by the Cordell Hull Foundation for International Education, now based in New York City. He is listed in Marquis' "Who's Who in American Politics."

=== Later career ===
However, Morrison resigned from the state House of Representatives after six years of service to pursue the development of an ethanol plant in Louisiana, which was eventually constructed and operating. He perceived the development of alternative energy sources as the most pressing problem in the nation at the time. However, because the Louisiana State Legislature later rescinded the 16% tax exemption on ethanol in order to give it a chance to develop, the plant became impossible to continue operating. There were many investors in the plant who were angry at him for losing money in the operation, but it was not his fault.

== Death ==
A lifetime smoker, Morrison died young on August 21, 1996, of lung cancer, which he had battled for two years. In his later years, he worked hard and summoned considerable local support, including former Mayor of New Orleans, Moon Landrieu, to renovate the old Rivergate convention center to a film studio, but the Hotel Association in New Orleans fought and obtained the city's permission to convert it into a casino. He was a visionary. Subsequent to his death, his dream has come to fruition. New Orleans did develop a number of local film studios in the warehouse district and other areas of the city, and evolved into an important hub for movie making. Following in the spirit of his father, he wanted New Orleans to develop viable industries apart from the tourist industry to sustain itself and garner respect.

In 1997, the legislature named a multi-layered interchange in honor of Morrison for being instrumental in getting funds appropriated to build the I-10 overpasses in the Carrollton neighborhood, the district that he represented in the Louisiana Legislature, that had been dedicated in 1977.

Morrison had two children, Rini and Chep.

He was survived by second wife, Marianne Mason Morrison of New York City, and first wife, Linda Stewart Newton of New Orleans.

== Notes ==
Preceded by Frank A. Marullo, Jr.	Louisiana State Representative for District 88 (Orleans Parish); 1974–1980	Succeeded by Eddie Heaton
