= Sherman Copelin =

American politician (born 1943)

Sherman Nathaniel Copelin, Jr.

Louisiana State Representative for District 99 ()Lower Ninth Ward in Orleans Parish
- In office 1986–2000
- Preceded by: Jon D. Johnson
- Succeeded by: Leonard Lucas

Speaker Pro Tempore of the Louisiana House
- In office 1992–1996
- Preceded by: Hunt Downer
- Succeeded by: Peppi Bruneau

Personal details
- Born: August 1943 (age 83) New Orleans, Louisiana, USA
- Party: Democratic
- Education: St. Augustine High School; Dillard University
- Occupation: Businessman

Sherman Nathaniel Copelin, Jr. (born August 1943), is an American politician and businessman from his native New Orleans, Louisiana.

The son of a funeral director, Copelin graduated from St. Augustine High School and then became active in student politics at historically black Dillard University, where he became student body president. He was hired to serve as an aide in the administration of Mayor Victor Schiro in 1968. In the 1970s, he and Don Hubbard emerged as the leaders of the black political organization called SOUL (Southern Organization for Unified Leadership). SOUL's effectiveness in rallying the support of African American voters for candidates like Louisiana Governor Edwin Edwards and New Orleans Mayor Moon Landrieu made him a powerful figure in New Orleans and Louisiana politics.

In the 1970s Copelin headed Superdome Services, Inc., a politically connected company contracted by the Landrieu administration to provide janitorial and security services for the then new Louisiana Superdome. Scandal emerged when Copelin was accused of receiving payoffs from companies seeking to obtain contracts from City Hall.

In 1986, Copelin was elected to the Louisiana House of Representatives from New Orleans's Lower Ninth Ward. He was subsequently the Speaker Pro Tempore. Success in business dealings led Copelin to move to Eastern New Orleans outside his district. The residency issue became an issue in his re-election campaign, and he was defeated in 1999 by the Reverend Leonard Lucas.

Copelin ran unsuccessfully in the New Orleans mayoral election of 1994.

Copelin is currently the head of the New Orleans East Business Association, and since Hurricane Katrina has publicly opposed the construction of new apartment complexes in New Orleans East.

== Sources ==
Bridges, Tyler. Bad Bet on the Bayou: The Rise of Gambling in Louisiana and the Fall of Governor Edwin Edwards. Farrar, Straus and Giroux, 2001.

DuBos, Clancy. "SOUL on the Ropes." Gambit Weekly. March 20, 2001.

Louisiana House of Representatives
Preceded by Jon D. Johnson	Louisiana State Representative for District 99 (Lower Ninth Ward of Orleans Parish); Sherman Nathaniel Copelin, Jr. 1986–2000	Succeeded by Leonard Lucas
Preceded by Hunt Downer	Speaker Pro Tempore of the Louisiana House of Representatives; Sherman Nathaniel Copelin, Jr. 1992 – 1996	Succeeded by Peppi Bruneau
