= Marc Morial =

American politician (born 1958)

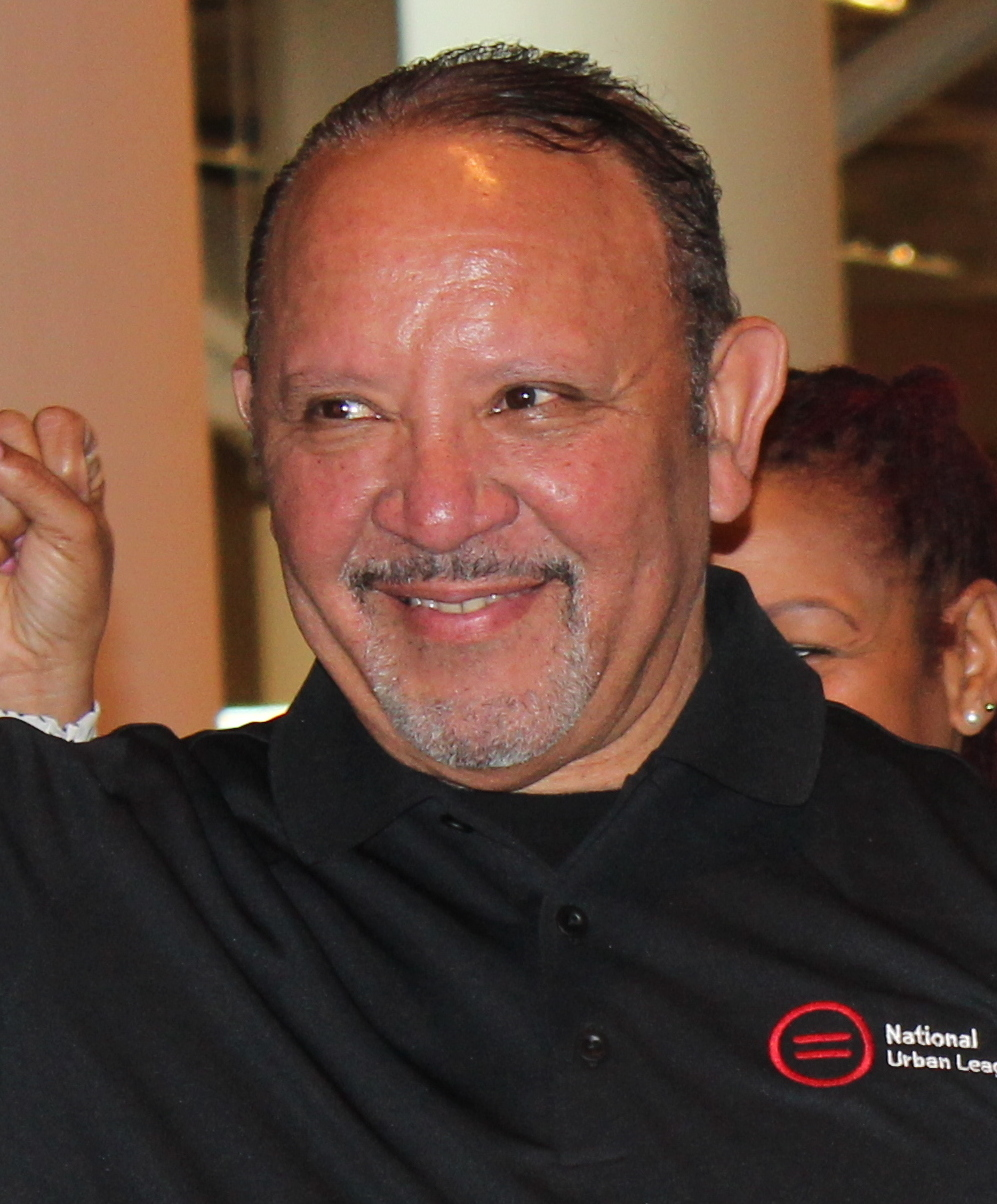
- Morial at the National Urban League Conference, 2025

59th Mayor of New Orleans
- In office May 2, 1994 – May 6, 2002
- Preceded by: Sidney Barthelemy
- Succeeded by: Ray Nagin

59th President of the United States Conference of Mayors
- In office 2001–2002
- Preceded by: Brent Coles
- Succeeded by: Thomas Menino

Member of the Louisiana Senate from the 4th district
- In office 1992–1994
- Preceded by: Ben Bagert
- Succeeded by: Paulette Irons

Personal details
- Born: Marc Haydel Morial; January 3, 1958 (age 68) New Orleans, Louisiana, U.S.
- Party: Democratic
- Spouse: Michelle Miller
- Relatives: Ernest Morial (father); Sybil Haydel Morial (mother)
- Education: University of Pennsylvania (BA); Georgetown University (JD)

Marc Haydel Morial (/ˌmɔːriˈæl/; born January 3, 1958) is an American lawyer and politician working the president of the National Urban League. Morial served as the 59th mayor of New Orleans from 1994 to 2002, president of the United States Conference of Mayors in 2001, and as a member of the Louisiana State Senate from 1992 to 1994.

== Early life and education ==
Morial was born to Ernest Nathan Morial, a politician, and Sybil Haydel Morial, an elementary school teacher. He is the second of five children. He was raised in Pontchartrain Park, New Orleans. Through his mother's side Morial is cousins with Curtis Graves and his daughter Gizelle Bryant, star on the reality TV show Real Housewives of Potomac.

Morial graduated from Jesuit High School as a member of the National Honor Society. One of only 14 Black students of 1,000 at Jesuit High School, he founded the Student Association for Black Achievement and organized the school's first Black History Month celebration.

Morial was included in Who's Who Among American High School Students, Who's Who in America, and Outstanding Young Men of America in high school.

In 1980, Morial earned a bachelor's degree in economics and African American studies from the University of Pennsylvania. Morial earned a Juris Doctor degree in 1983 from Georgetown Law Center. At Georgetown, he was elected first-year delegate to the Student Bar Association and served as a member and head of fundraising for the National Black Law Students Association.

== Career ==
After working during his third year in law school for Congressman Mickey Leland, he returned to New Orleans to join the firm Barham and Churchill. In 1985, Morial established a private law practice in New Orleans.

After a narrow defeat by William Jefferson in 1990, Morial was elected to the Louisiana State Senate in 1991. He served until being elected mayor of New Orleans.

=== State senator ===
As a Louisiana state senator (1992–1994), Morial was chairman of the Educational Institution Subcommittee and member of the Louisiana Legislative Black Caucus.

=== Mayor of New Orleans ===
Marc Morial was elected mayor of New Orleans, Louisiana, in 1994, defeating Donald Mintz with 54% of the vote. He was the youngest mayor of New Orleans in 50 years and at the time was one of the youngest mayors of any major American city. He campaigned with the promise to "clean out City Hall with a shovel not a broom". Morial won re-election to a second term in 1998, receiving almost 80% of the votes.

During his time as mayor, the rate of violent crime in New Orleans fell by 50%." From 2001 to 2002, Morial was president of the United States Conference of Mayors. He served as chief spokesperson for America’s Cities (2001–2002). In addition to his time as president, he also served as the organization’s chairman for the Committee on Arts, chairman for the Federal Budget Task Force, chairman for the Task Force on Hunger and Homelessness, and vice president, among other positions.

=== National Urban League ===
In 2003, Morial was selected to head the National Urban League. In 2004, Morial added a new metric, the Equality Index, to the League's annual State of Black America.

=== Presidential commissions ===
Morial served as chair of the Census Advisory Committee (2010), and as a member of the President's Advisory Council on Financial Capability (2012–2015). He was also appointed to the Twenty-First Century Workforce Commission by President Bill Clinton (1998–2000).

== Publications ==
Morial has written two non-fiction books, published speeches, weekly newspaper columns and a weekly newsletter, “ReMarcs” for the National Urban League.

- "A National Action Plan for America’s Cities", The Urban Lawyer: The National Quarterly on State and Local Government Law, Volume 34, Number 3, Summer 2002.
- Decisions of Courage, a book of bpeeches by Mayor Marc H. Morial from his first term as Mayor of New Orleans. 1998
- "To Be Equal", a weekly newspaper column. 2003–present
- The Gumbo Coalition, 2020

Political offices
Preceded by Sidney Barthelemy	Mayor of New Orleans; 1994–2002	Succeeded by Ray Nagin
Preceded by H. Brent Coles	President of the United States Conference of Mayors; 2001–2002	Succeeded by Thomas Menino
Non-profit organization positions
Preceded by Hugh Price	President of the National Urban League; 2003–present	Incumbent
