= Moon Landrieu =

American politician (1930–2022)

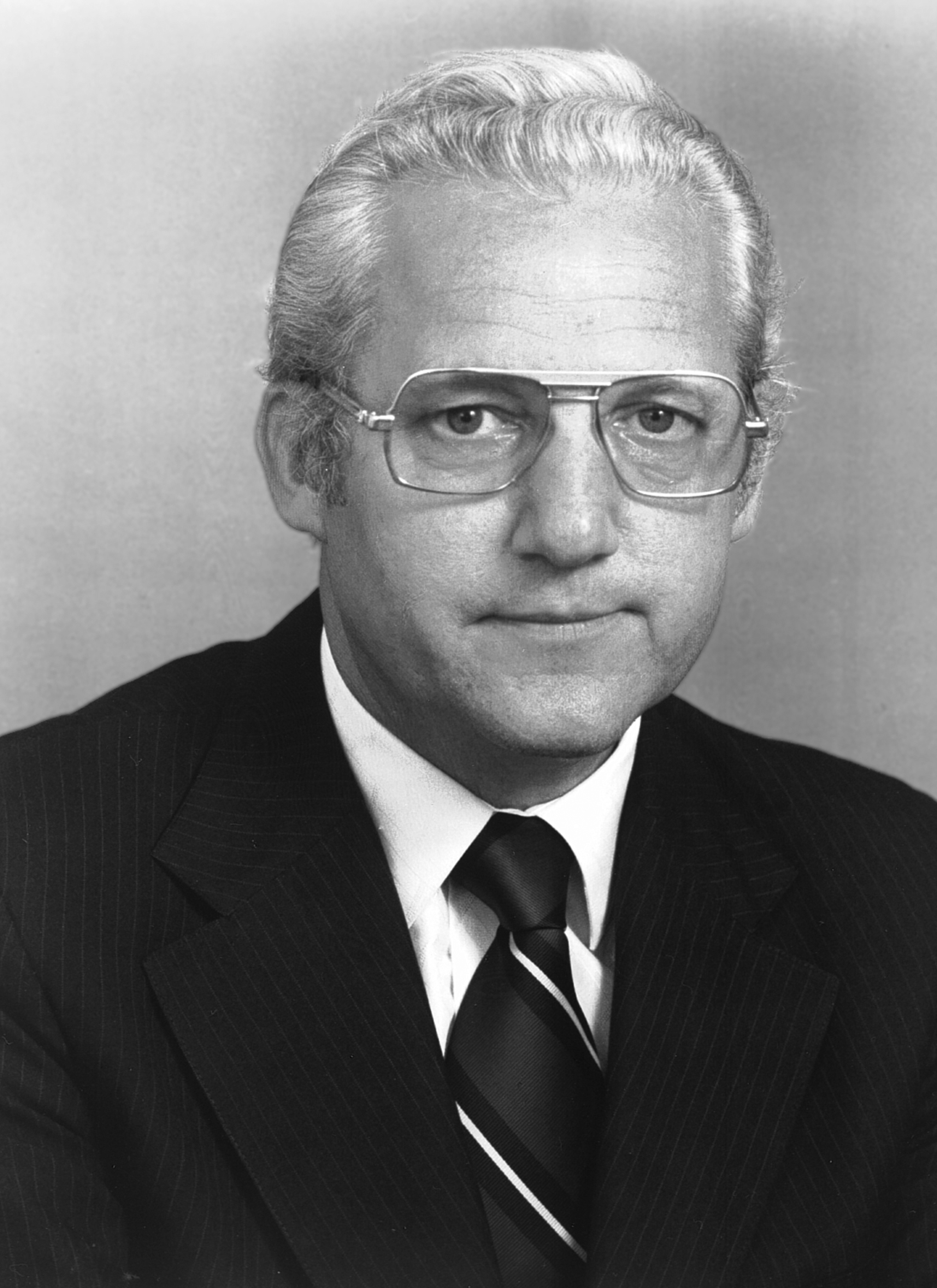

7th United States Secretary of Housing and Urban Development
- In office September 24, 1979 – January 20, 1981
- President: Jimmy Carter
- Preceded by: Patricia Roberts Harris
- Succeeded by: Samuel Pierce

56th Mayor of New Orleans
- In office May 4, 1970 – May 1, 1978
- Preceded by: Victor H. Schiro
- Succeeded by: Ernest Nathan Morial

33rd President of the United States Conference of Mayors
- In office 1975–1976
- Preceded by: Joseph Alioto
- Succeeded by: Kenneth A. Gibson

Member of the New Orleans City Council from the at-large district
- In office 1966–1970
- Preceded by: Joseph V. DiRosa
- Succeeded by: James A. Moreau

Member of the Louisiana House of Representatives from the 12th district
- In office 1960–1966
- Preceded by: J. Marshall Brown
- Succeeded by: Eddie L. Sapir

Judge of the Louisiana Court of Appeals for the Fourth Circuit
- In office 1992–2000
- Succeeded by: Max N. Tobias, Jr.
- Constituency: 1st district, division D

Personal details
- Born: Maurice Edwin Landrieu; July 23, 1930 New Orleans, Louisiana, U.S.
- Died: September 5, 2022 (aged 92) New Orleans, Louisiana, U.S.
- Party: Democratic
- Spouse: Verna Satterlee (m. 1954)
- Children: 9, including Mary and Mitch
- Education: Loyola University New Orleans (BA, JD)

Military service
- Branch/service: United States Army
- Years of service: 1954–1957

Moon Edwin Landrieu (born Maurice Edwin Landrieu; July 23, 1930 – September 5, 2022) was an American lawyer and politician who served as the 56th mayor of New Orleans from 1970 to 1978. A member of the Democratic Party, he represented New Orleans' Twelfth Ward in the Louisiana House of Representatives from 1960 to 1966. He served on the New Orleans City Council as a member at-large from 1966 to 1970, and was the United States Secretary of Housing and Urban Development under U.S. president Jimmy Carter from 1979 to 1981.

He was the last white mayor of New Orleans until 2010, when his son Mitch was elected mayor.

== Early life and career ==
Landrieu was born in Uptown New Orleans to Joseph Geoffrey Landrieu and Loretta Bechtel. Bechtel was of French and German descent, with grandparents who came to Louisiana from Alsace and Prussia. Joseph was born in 1892 in Mississippi, the son of Frenchman Victor Firmin Landrieu and Cerentha Mackey, the out-of-wedlock child of a black woman and an unknown father.

Landrieu went to Jesuit High School and received a baseball scholarship to Loyola University New Orleans, where he played college baseball as a pitcher. He earned a Bachelor of Arts in business administration in 1952 and a Juris Doctor in 1954. As an undergraduate, he was elected the student body president at Loyola. In 1954, he joined the United States Army as a second lieutenant and served in the Judge Advocate General's Corps until 1957. Upon completion of army service, he opened a law practice and taught accounting at Loyola.

In the late 1950s, Landrieu became involved in the youth wing of the mayor deLesseps Morrison's Crescent City Democratic Organization. Running on Morrison's ticket, Landrieu was elected by the 12th Ward of New Orleans to the Louisiana House of Representatives in 1960. There he voted against the "hate bills" of the segregationists, which the Louisiana State Legislature passed in the effort to thwart the desegregation of public facilities and public schools.

In 1962, Landrieu ran for New Orleans City Council and lost. In 1966, he was elected councilman-at-large, defeating incumbent Joseph V. DiRosa. In 1969, he led a successful push for a city ordinance outlawing segregation based on race or religion in public accommodations, an issue that had been addressed nationally in the Civil Rights Act of 1964. As councilman, Landrieu also voted to remove the Confederate flag from the council chambers and voted to establish a biracial human relations committee. He succeeded with both votes.

== Landrieu as mayor ==
Landrieu was elected the mayor of New Orleans in the election of 1970 to succeed fellow Democrat Victor Schiro. His opponent in the Democratic primary runoff was the Louisiana lieutenant governor, Jimmy Fitzmorris. In the general election, Landrieu defeated Ben C. Toledano. In that contest, Landrieu received support from 99 percent of the black voters.

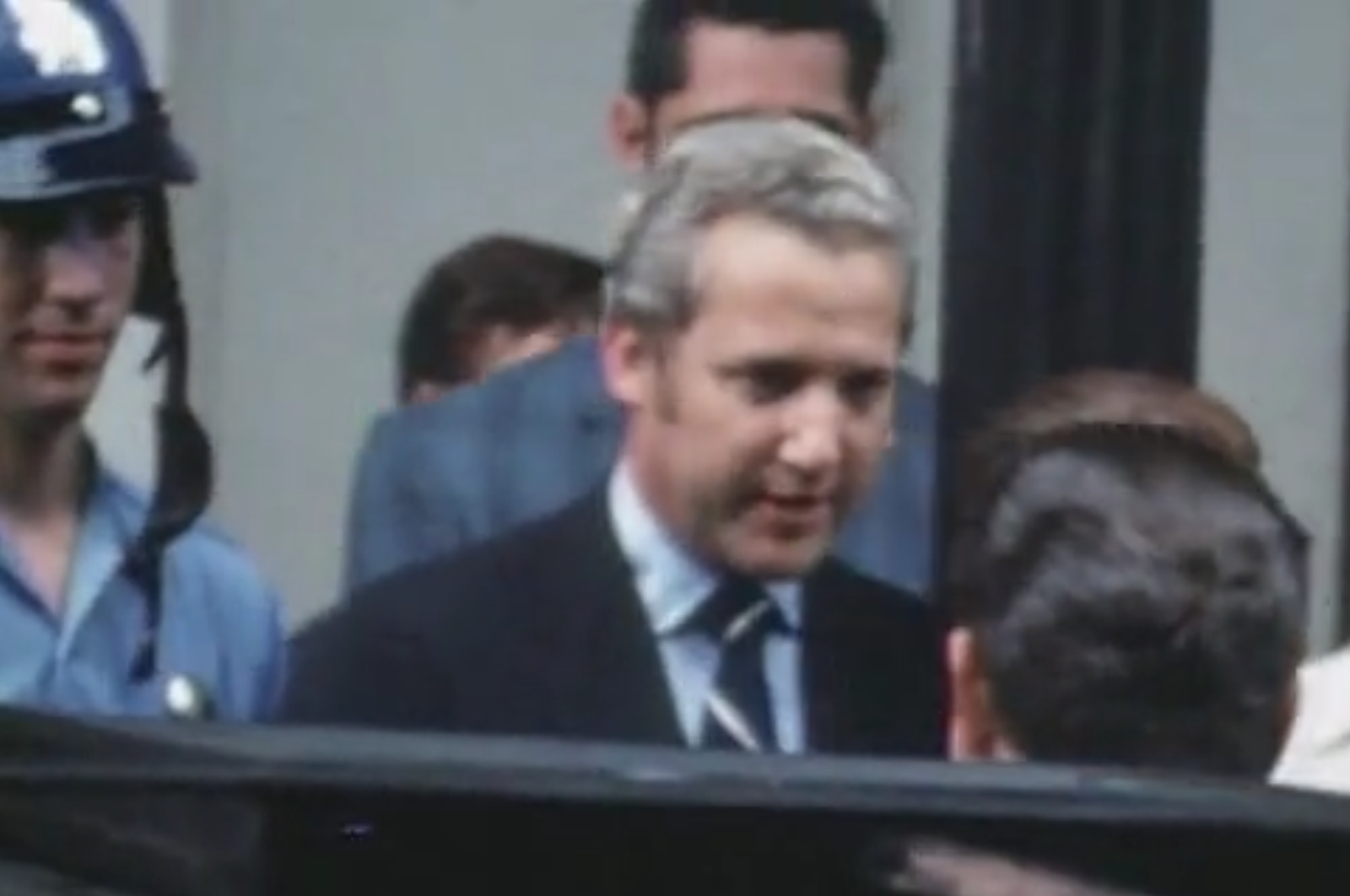
Landrieu greeting the president, Richard Nixon, in 1970

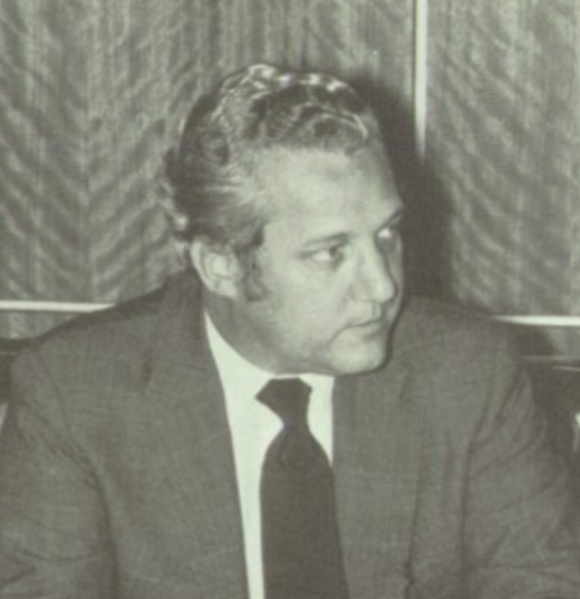
Landrieu as mayor in 1971

On May 3, 1970, the day before he took his oath of office as mayor, Landrieu received a death threat by telephone, but authorities quickly caught the culprit. During his tenure as mayor, Landrieu oversaw desegregation of city government and public facilities and encouraged integration within business and professional organizations.

Before Landrieu was elected, there were no high-ranking black employees or officials in City Hall. He worked actively to change this by appointing African Americans to top positions, including Terrence R. Duvernay as chief administrative officer, the number two position in the executive branch of city government. Duvernay went on to become U.S. deputy secretary of housing and urban development under the president, Bill Clinton, in 1993.

When Landrieu took office in 1970, African Americans made up 19 percent of city employees. By 1978, this number had risen to 43 percent. He also appointed Reverend A. L. Davis to fill a temporary vacancy on the City Council; Davis was the city's first black city councilor. Landrieu also employed an African American assistant: Robert H. Tucker, Jr.

Landrieu obtained federal funds for the revitalization of New Orleans' poor neighborhoods, and he promoted the involvement of minority-owned businesses in the city's economic life. Like his predecessor, Landrieu presided over continued suburban-style growth in the Algiers and New Orleans East districts, with Algiers essentially built-out, having exited its greenfield development stage, by the end of his administration.

He advocated for the creation of the Downtown Development District to revitalize the New Orleans CBD, and worked to promote the city's tourism industry. His tourism-related projects included the Moon Walk, a riverfront promenade facing the French Quarter, the $163 million Louisiana Superdome, and renovations of the French Market and Jackson Square.

By the midpoint of Schiro's mayoral administration, an accelerating number of building demolitions were approved and other projects were also being contemplated, such as the elevated Claiborne Expressway and Riverfront Expressway segments of I-10. Landrieu authorized the 1972 New Orleans Housing and Neighborhood Preservation Study. Most of that study's recommendations were enacted by Landrieu, including the 1976 establishment of the Historic District Landmarks Commission ("HDLC"), which extended design review and demolition controls for the first time to parts of New Orleans outside the French Quarter.

During 1975–1976, Landrieu served as president of the United States Conference of Mayors. He was reelected in 1974 and served until April 1978. After leaving office, he was succeeded by Dutch Morial, the city's first black mayor. Landrieu was the last white elected mayor of New Orleans until his son, Mitch, was elected in 2010.

== After city hall ==
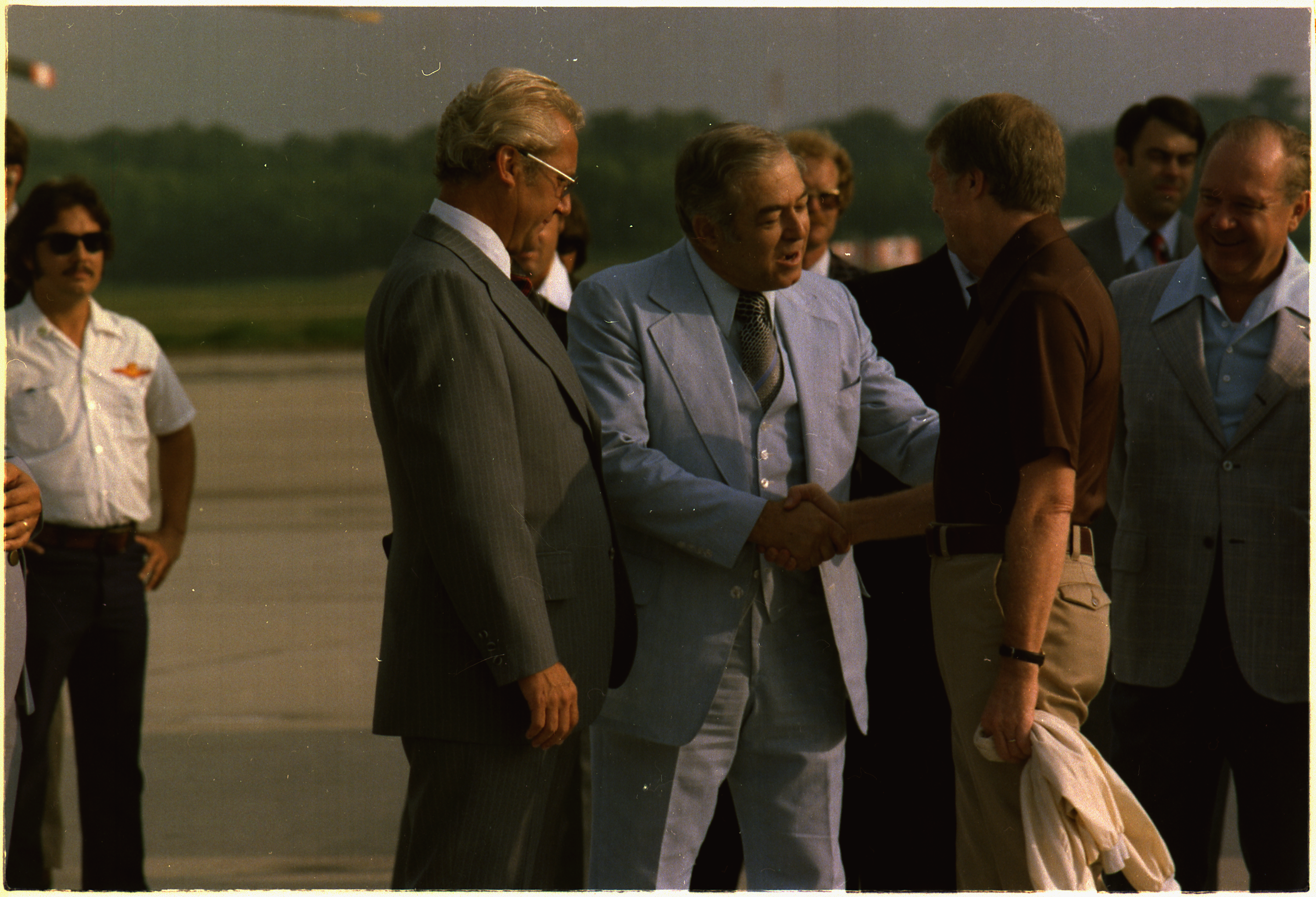
Landrieu with the president, Jimmy Carter, in New Orleans in 1979

After leaving office in 1978, Landrieu served as the secretary of the United States Department of Housing and Urban Development (HUD). President Jimmy Carter appointed Landrieu to this post during a major reshuffle in which he reassigned Patricia Harris to replace Joseph A. Califano Jr. at the Department of Health, Education, and Welfare.

Carter chose Landrieu for the position in order to draw Catholic Democratic party voters away from Ted Kennedy in the upcoming 1980 Democratic Party presidential primaries. Landrieu was elected to serve as a judge of the Louisiana 4th Circuit Court of Appeals in 1992, and he served until his retirement in 2000.

In 2004, Landrieu was inducted into the Louisiana Political Museum and Hall of Fame in Winnfield. His personal papers are archived at Loyola University New Orleans and the New Orleans Public Library.

== Personal life ==
"Moon" was a childhood nickname of Landrieu's. He legally changed his first name to "Moon" in 1969 during his first mayoral campaign. In 1954, Landrieu married Verna Satterlee. They had nine children. Among them are former U.S. senator Mary Landrieu, who served from 1997 to 2015, and the former mayor of New Orleans, Mitch Landrieu. The family is Catholic.

Landrieu died at home in New Orleans on September 5, 2022, at age 92. The cause of death was heart failure after having a heart attack. His death was confirmed by longtime aide Ryan Berni.

== See also ==
- Timeline of New Orleans, 1960s–1970s

Louisiana House of Representatives
Preceded by J. Marshall Brown	Member of the Louisiana House of Representatives from the 12th district 1960–1966	Succeeded by Eddie L. Sapir
Civic offices
Preceded by Joseph V. DiRosa	Member of the New Orleans City Council from the at-large district 1966–1970	Succeeded by James A. Moreau
Political offices
Preceded by Victor Schiro	Mayor of New Orleans; May 4, 1970 – May 1, 1978	Succeeded by Ernest Nathan Morial
Preceded by Patricia Roberts Harris	United States Secretary of Housing and Urban Development; September 24, 1979 – January 20, 1981	Succeeded by Samuel Pierce
Legal offices
Preceded by ???	Judge of the Louisiana Court of Appeals for the Fourth Circuit; 1st district, division D 1992–2000	Succeeded by Max N. Tobias Jr.
