= Bessie Behan =

American social leader

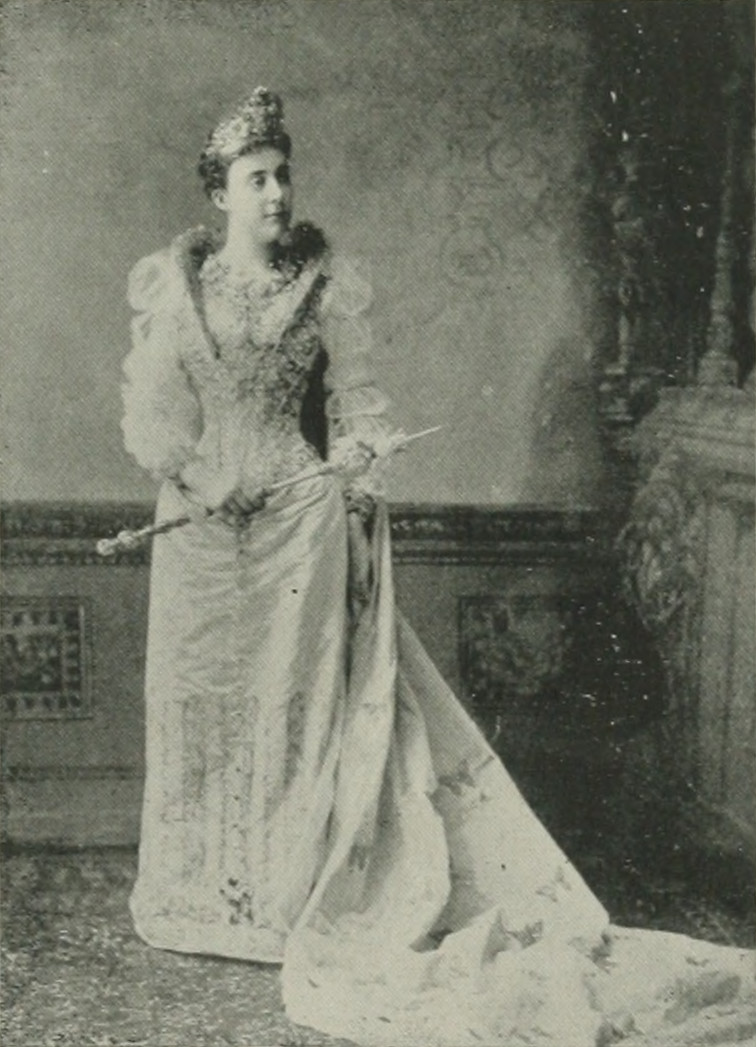
Portrait photo from A Woman of the Century

Bessie Behan (after marriage, Lewis; 1872–1956) was an American social leader.

== Biography ==
Elizabeth Antoinette Behan was born in New Orleans, Louisiana, on March 6, 1872. Her father was Gen. William J. Behan, a prominent southern merchant and sugar planter who served as Mayor of New Orleans. Bessie's mother, Kate Walker Behan, was the city's social leader and philanthropist.

She was educated at home by skilled governesses and had all the advantages of much travel. Her associations in New Orleans made the acquisition of the French language easy and natural, and she was thus master of two languages. After completing her education, she debuted in New Orleans's society in 1891.

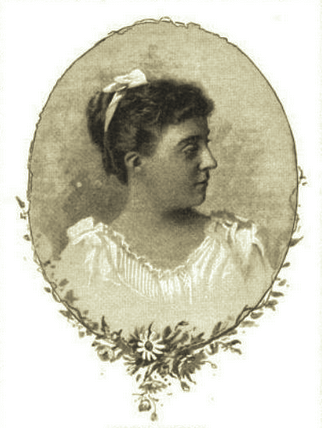
(1891)

The most coveted social honor in New Orleans in that era was to be chosen queen in the Mardi Gras Carnival. That honor fell to Behan in the carnival of 1891. She was the youngest woman yet selected for coronation in that festival.

On October 18, 1892, she married Dr. Hampden Sidney Lewis in New Orleans.

In 1913, she received a degree in French literature from the University of the Sorbonne.

Lewis made a gift to the Howard Memorial Library in 1924: a collection of literature dealing with the Confederacy period of the Confederacy. The books and the complete set of the Southern Historical Society papers belonged to Lewis' parents.

Her jewels from the Rex Ball, Carnival of 1891, were donated to the Louisiana State Museum in 1929.
