= Napoleon House =

Historic house in Louisiana, United States

- Mayor Girod House
- U.S. National Register of Historic Places
- U.S. National Historic Landmark
- U.S. National Historic Landmark District – Contributing property
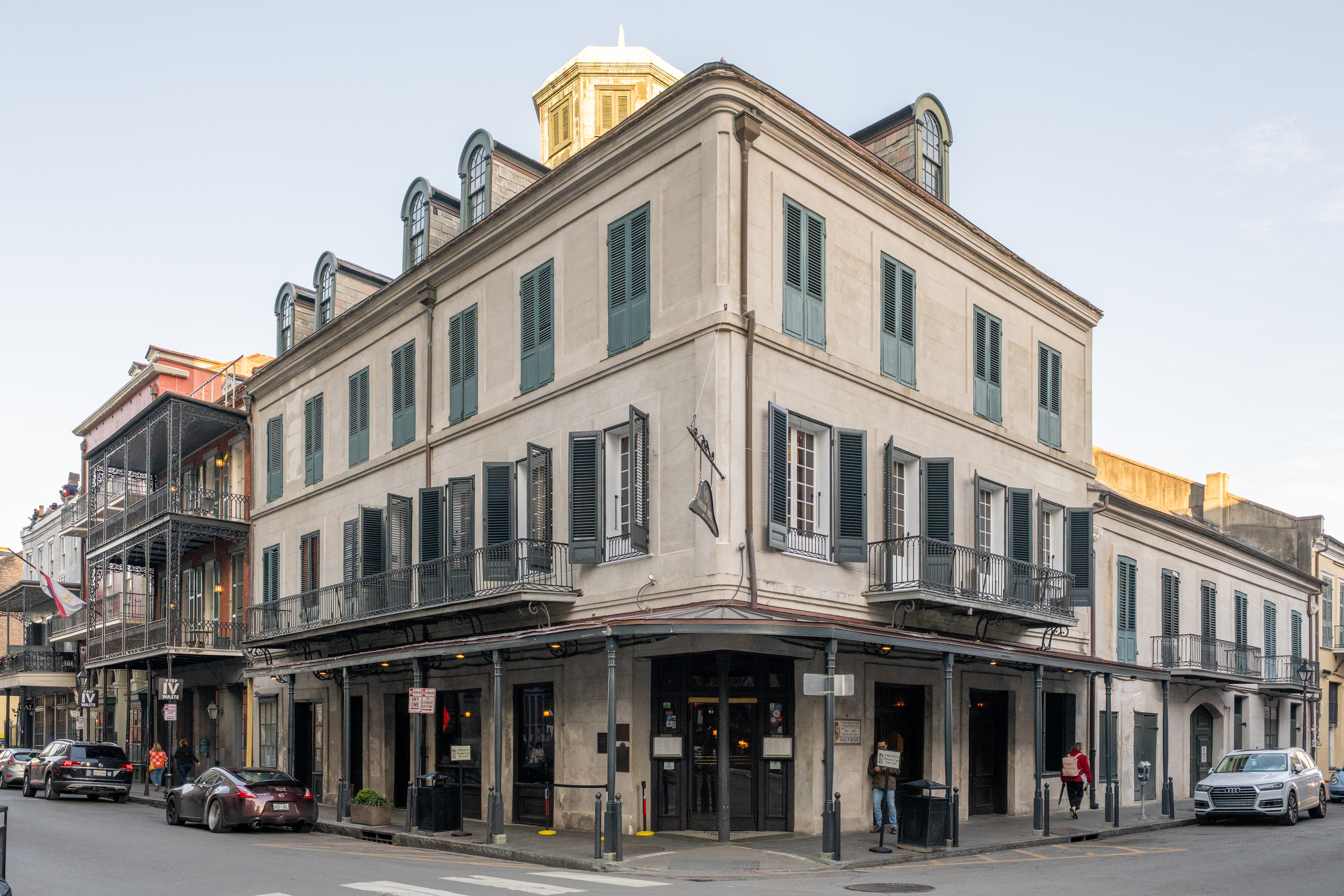

- Location within East New Orleans Location within Louisiana Location within the United States
- Location: 500 Chartres St., New Orleans, Louisiana
- Coordinates: 29°57′20.5″N 90°3′54″W
- Area: less than one acre
- Built: 1797
- Architectural style: Colonial
- Part of: Vieux Carre Historic District (ID66000377)
- NRHP reference No.: 70000254

Significant dates
- Added to NRHP: April 15, 1970
- Designated NHL: April 15, 1970
- Designated NHLDCP: December 21, 1965

The Napoleon House (French: Maison Napoléon; Spanish: Casa de Napoleón), also known as the Mayor Girod House or Nicolas Girod House, is a historic building at 500 Chartres Street in the French Quarter of New Orleans, Louisiana, United States. Built in 1794 and enlarged in 1814, its name derives from the local legend that it was intended as a residence for Napoleon Bonaparte after his exile. A plan to bring Napoleon to Louisiana was halted by news of his death in 1821.

The building was also the home of Nicholas Girod (d. 1840), mayor of New Orleans. One of the city's finer private residences in the early 19th century, the building housed a local grocery at the start of the 20th century and since 1914 has operated as a restaurant called Napoleon House. The upper floors of the building have been converted to apartments, where some of the original interior decorative elements may still be seen.

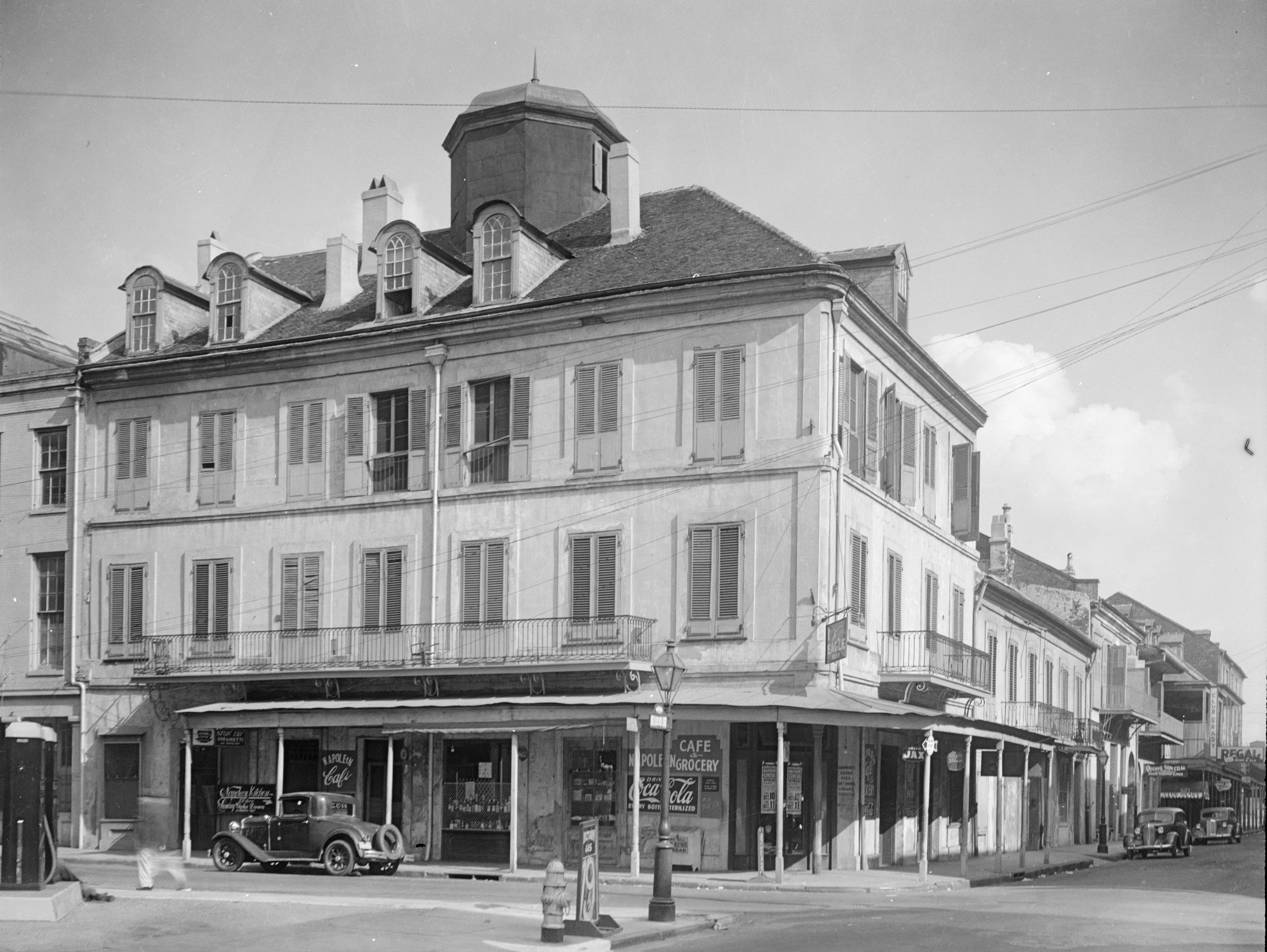
In 1934, the famous building housed the "Napoleon Cafe and Grocery".

It was declared to be a National Historic Landmark in 1970, as one of the city's finest examples of French-influenced architecture. It is a three-story brick stuccoed building, with a dormered hip roof and cupola. Shallow ironwork balconies with austere styling adorn the second floor.

The Napoleon House restaurant has an old-time New Orleans atmosphere and serves such traditional dishes as red beans and rice, gumbo, and jambalaya; it has been particularly known among locals for its muffaletta sandwiches. The bar is known for serving its "Pimm's Cup" cocktail. Classical music is played on the sound system.

== See also ==
- List of National Historic Landmarks in Louisiana
- National Register of Historic Places listings in Orleans Parish, Louisiana
