= William Behan =

William Behan may refer to:

- Billy Behan (1911–1991), Irish footballer
- William J. Behan (1840–1928), American politician
