= Edward Henry Durell =

American judge (1810–1887)

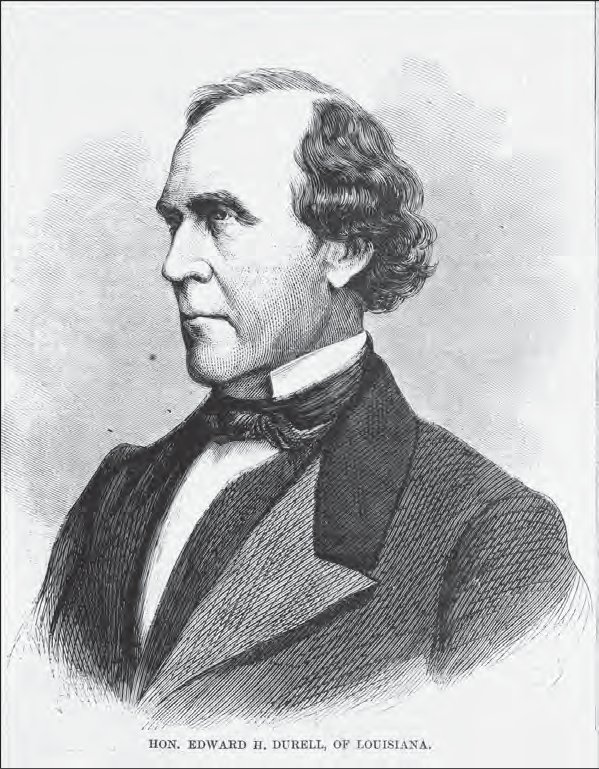

Judge of the United States District Court for the District of Louisiana
- In office July 27, 1866 – December 4, 1874
- Appointed by: operation of law
- Preceded by: Seat established by 14 Stat. 300
- Succeeded by: Edward Coke Billings

Judge of the United States District Court for the Eastern District of Louisiana
- In office May 20, 1863 – July 27, 1866
- Appointed by: Abraham Lincoln
- Preceded by: Theodore Howard McCaleb
- Succeeded by: Seat abolished

Personal details
- Born: Edward Henry Durell; July 14, 1810 Portsmouth, New Hampshire
- Died: March 29, 1887 (aged 76) Schoharie, New York
- Resting place: Pine Hill Cemetery; Dover, New Hampshire
- Party: Republican
- Education: Harvard University read law

Edward Henry Durell (July 14, 1810 – March 29, 1887) was the 25th mayor of New Orleans, Louisiana and a United States district judge of the United States District Court for the District of Louisiana and the United States District Court for the Eastern District of Louisiana.

== Education and career ==
Born on July 14, 1810, in the Governor Wentworth House in Portsmouth, New Hampshire, Durell attended Phillips Exeter Academy, then graduated from Harvard University in 1831, and read law in 1834. He was fluent in German, French and Spanish. He entered private practice in Pittsburg, Mississippi and New Orleans, Louisiana from 1835 to 1854. He was a member of the New Orleans City Council in 1854. He resumed private practice in New Orleans. He was President of the Bureau of Finance in New Orleans from 1862 to 1863. He was the 25th Mayor of New Orleans in 1863. Durell was a member of the Republican Party.

== Federal judicial service ==
Durell was nominated by President Lincoln to the United States District Court for the Eastern District of Louisiana on January 5, 1864. The Senate returned the nomination to the President on February 3, 1864.

Durell received a recess appointment from President Abraham Lincoln on May 20, 1863, to a seat on the United States District Court for the Eastern District of Louisiana vacated by Judge Theodore Howard McCaleb. He was nominated to the same position by President Lincoln on February 8, 1864. He was confirmed by the United States Senate on February 17, 1864, and received his commission the same day. Durell was reassigned by operation of law to the United States District Court for the District of Louisiana on July 27, 1866, to a new seat authorized by 14 Stat. 300. His service terminated on December 4, 1874, due to his resignation.

=== Circumstances of his resignation ===
Durell resigned after the United States House Committee on the Judiciary voted to recommend to the full United States House of Representatives that he be impeached for misconduct. Durell had been accused of irregularities in bankruptcy proceedings, corruption and drunkenness.

== Later career and death ==
Following his resignation from the federal bench, Durell returned to private practice in Newburgh and Schoharie, New York from 1875 to 1877. He died on March 29, 1887, in Schoharie. He was interred in Pine Hill Cemetery in Dover, New Hampshire. He attempted to write a history of the South which was never completed.

== Personal ==
After moving to New York, Durell married a widow, Mary Seitz Gebhart.

== Books ==
In 1845, Durell's book, New Orleans as I Found It, was published under the pen name H. Didimus. The book deals with Durell's experience when arriving at New Orleans and how things are different from other places in the United States. Published in 1867, Durell participated in the formation of Rules, Orders and Regulations in Bankruptcy : Adopted by the Hon. Edward H. Durell, Judge of the District Court of the United States, for the District of Louisiana, July 15, 1867. This book consists of 24 adopted rules that deal with bankruptcy.

== Sources ==
Political offices
Preceded by James F. Miller	Mayor of New Orleans; 1863–1863	Succeeded by James F. Miller
Legal offices
Preceded by Theodore Howard McCaleb	Judge of the United States District Court for the Eastern District of Louisiana; 1863–1866	Succeeded by Seat abolished
Preceded by Seat established by 14 Stat. 300	Judge of the United States District Court for the District of Louisiana; 1866–1874	Succeeded by Edward Coke Billings
