= 1950 New Orleans mayoral election =

- January 24, 1950
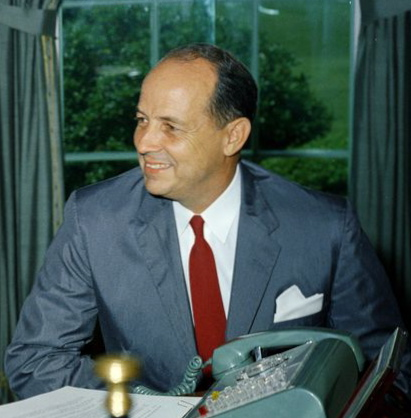
Candidate	deLesseps Morrison	Charles C. Zatarain
Party	Democratic	Democratic
Popular vote	120,582	58,620
Percentage	65.1%	31.7%
Mayor of New Orleans before election
deLesseps Morrison
Democratic
Elected Mayor of New Orleans
deLesseps Morrison
Democratic

The New Orleans mayoral election of 1950 was held on January 24, 1950. It resulted in the re-election of deLesseps Morrison to his second term as Mayor of New Orleans.

Like most Southern states between Reconstruction and the civil rights era, Louisiana's Republican Party was virtually nonexistent in terms of electoral support. This meant that the city's Democratic primary was the real contest for mayor.

Incumbent mayor deLesseps Morrison was backed by labor unions, the major newspapers, and black New Orleanians, but he also publicly maintained his support for segregation on the campaign trail.

After being defeated in the election of 1946, the Regular Democratic Organization political machine was anxious to regain control of the city. After an unsuccessful search for a candidate that briefly included former mayor Robert Maestri, the RDO threw its support behind Charles C. Zatarain, a local businessman and member of the Louisiana Tax Commission. Zatarain also received the endorsement of Governor Earl Long. Though running against Morrison, Zatarain's platform was largely a watered-down copy of Morrison's. Zatarain also used racial appeals in his campaign, charging that Morrison planned to build housing for African Americans in Lakeview and Gentilly and circulating photographs of Morrison with black leader Ralph Bunche. Another minor candidate, Alvin A. Cobb, ran on an explicit Dixiecrat platform that included racial attacks on Morrison's policies.

In the first primary, Morrison won an overwhelming majority over Zatarain, receiving 65% of the vote and winning every one of the city's 17 wards. Cobb received 4,751 votes. No runoff was needed. With five of Morrison's seven candidates for council also winning election, it seemed as though the RDO was irrevocably beaten.

Candidate	Votes received	Percentage
deLesseps Morrison (incumbent)	120,582	65.12%
Charles C. Zatarain	58,620	31.66%
Alvin A. Cobb	4,751	2.57%
Anthony J. Deckelmann	932	0.50%
Mrs. Louis P. Dillon	282	0.15%

Preceded by 1946 mayoral election	New Orleans mayoral elections	Succeeded by 1954 mayoral election

== Sources ==
- Fairclough, Adam. Race and Democracy: The Civil Rights Struggle in Louisiana, 1915-1972. University of Georgia Press, 1995.
- Haas, Edward F. DeLesseps S. Morrison and the Image of Reform: New Orleans Politics, 1946-1961. LSU Press, 1974.
- Parker, Joseph B. The Morrison Era: Reform Politics in New Orleans. Pelican, 1974.
