= Thomas J. Lewis =

American colonel (1857–1920)

Thomas Jefferson Lewis
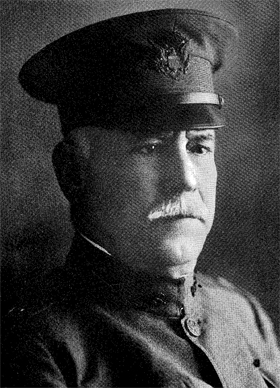
- Lewis as a Lieutenant Colonel
- Born: April 6, 1857; New Orleans, Louisiana, U.S.
- Died: January 16, 1920 (aged 62); Baltimore, Maryland, U.S.
- Burial place: Arlington National Cemetery, Arlington, Virginia, U.S.
- Alma mater: United States Military Academy
- Spouse: Emma Rising
- Military career
- Branch: United States Army
- Service years: 1875–1920
- Rank: Colonel
- Commands: 2nd Cavalry Regiment
- Conflicts: Spanish–American War: Santiago campaign; Battle of San Juan Hill; Siege of Santiago; Moro Rebellion

Thomas Jefferson Lewis (1857–1920) was an American Colonel of the Spanish–American War, the Philippine–American War and World War I. He commanded the 2nd Cavalry Regiment during the Battle of San Juan Hill and was given commands of other cavalry regiments during his career.

== Early life ==
Thomas born on April 6, 1857, at New Orleans as the son of John L. Lewis who was the Mayor of New Orleans at the time of his birth, the grandson of Joshua Lewis who served as a judge at the Superior Court of the Territory of Orleans and the great nephew of Meriwether Lewis. Thomas spent most of his childhood within his father's plantation with himself attending the schools at New Orleans before graduating from Tulane University.

== Career in the Frontier ==
After graduating from Tulane University, Lewis enrolled in the United States Military Academy on September 1, 1875, after securing his appointment. He graduated as part of the Class of 1879 on June 13 as a Second Lieutenant of the 2nd Cavalry Regiment which was stationed at the Northwest. He was initially stationed at Fort Custer before being transferred to Fort Walla Walla for a long time before finally being transferred to the Boise Barracks until June 1890 when he was transferred to Fort Lowell, the Jefferson Barracks Military Post and Fort Wingate. While at Fort Wingate, he commanded the Navajo Indian Troop before being transferred to Fort Riley from October 14, 1896, to April 19, 1898.

== Spanish–American War ==
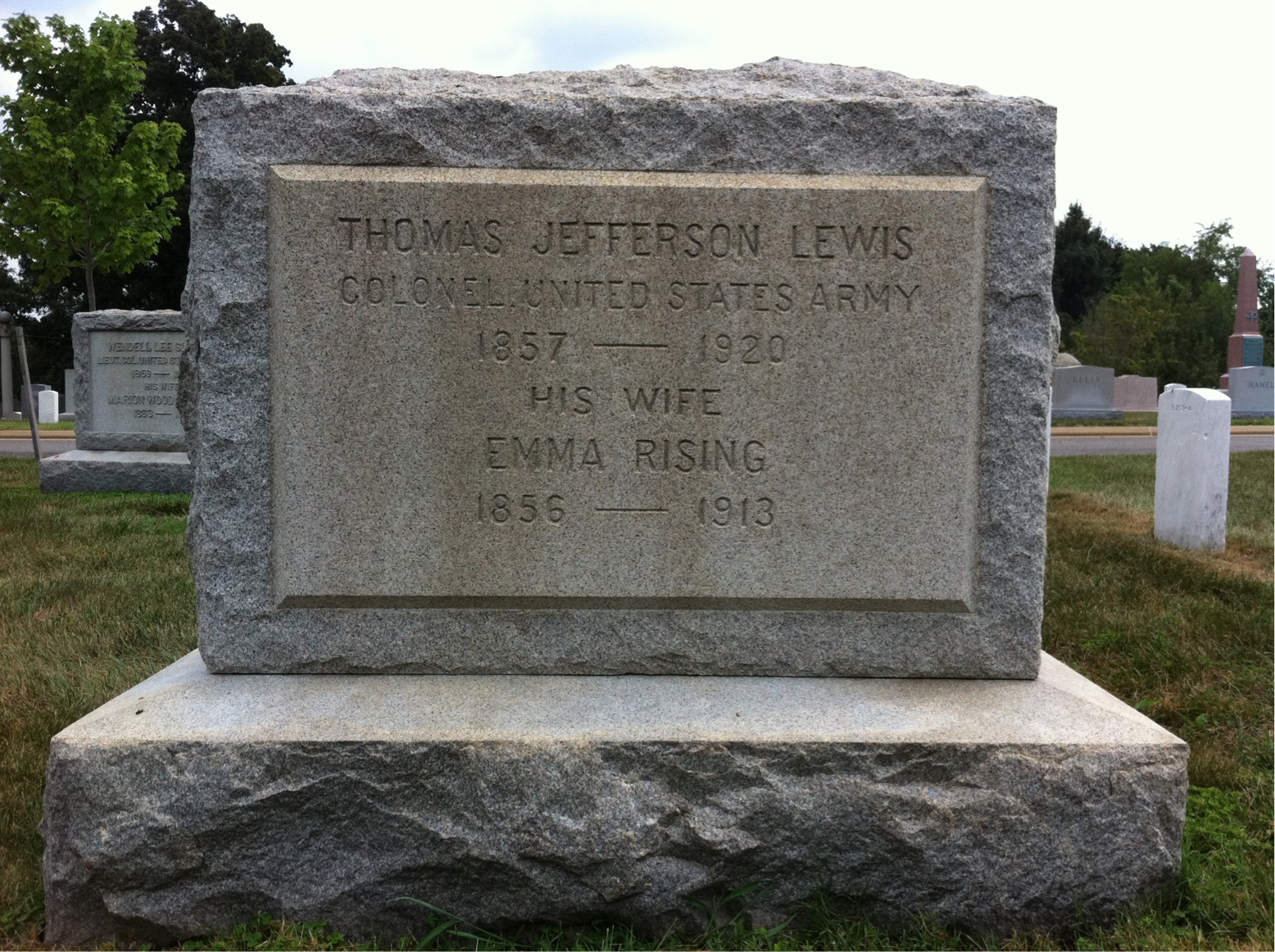
Grave at Arlington National Cemetery

During the Spanish–American War, Lewis continued to command the 2nd Cavalry Regiment as part of the Fifth Army Corps. The regiment arrived at Tampa Bay and was sent to Daiquirí, Oriente Province on June 23, 1898. He led the regiment at the Battle of San Juan Hill and the Siege of Santiago and was one of the first to receive news of the Spanish surrender from July 19 to August 16. After the war, he was sent to Montauk, New York, in August 1898 before being transferred to Huntsville, Alabama, and returned to Cuba in February 1899 to command Companies E, F and G of the 2nd Cavalry Regiment.

== Progressive Era and World War I ==
He was later sent to Fort Myer and was detailed at the General Recruiting Service. Lewis also returned to Fort Riley and then transferred to Fort Sheridan. Lewis was then made a member of the Cavalry Examining Board from August 1906 to July 1909 while being given command of the First Squadron of the 13th Cavalry Regiment from July 27 to September 6, 1907, and participated in the Moro Rebellion. Before being placed on the reserves, Lewis was the adjutant-general of the Southern Department of San Antonio, Texas, and adjutant of the 1st Cavalry Brigade.

Lewis was placed on the United States Army Reserve on December 1, 1913, and was sent to the General Recruiting Service at Oklahoma City and New Orleans from 1913 and 1918. After the announcement of the American entry into World War I, Lewis requested that he had a more active position and was sent to Portland, Oregon, on July 1, 1918, and given colonelcy on July 9, 1918. Lewis died on January 16, 1920, while he was at Baltimore and was buried at Arlington National Cemetery along with his wife, Emma Rising.
