= John T. Monroe =

American politician (1822–1871)

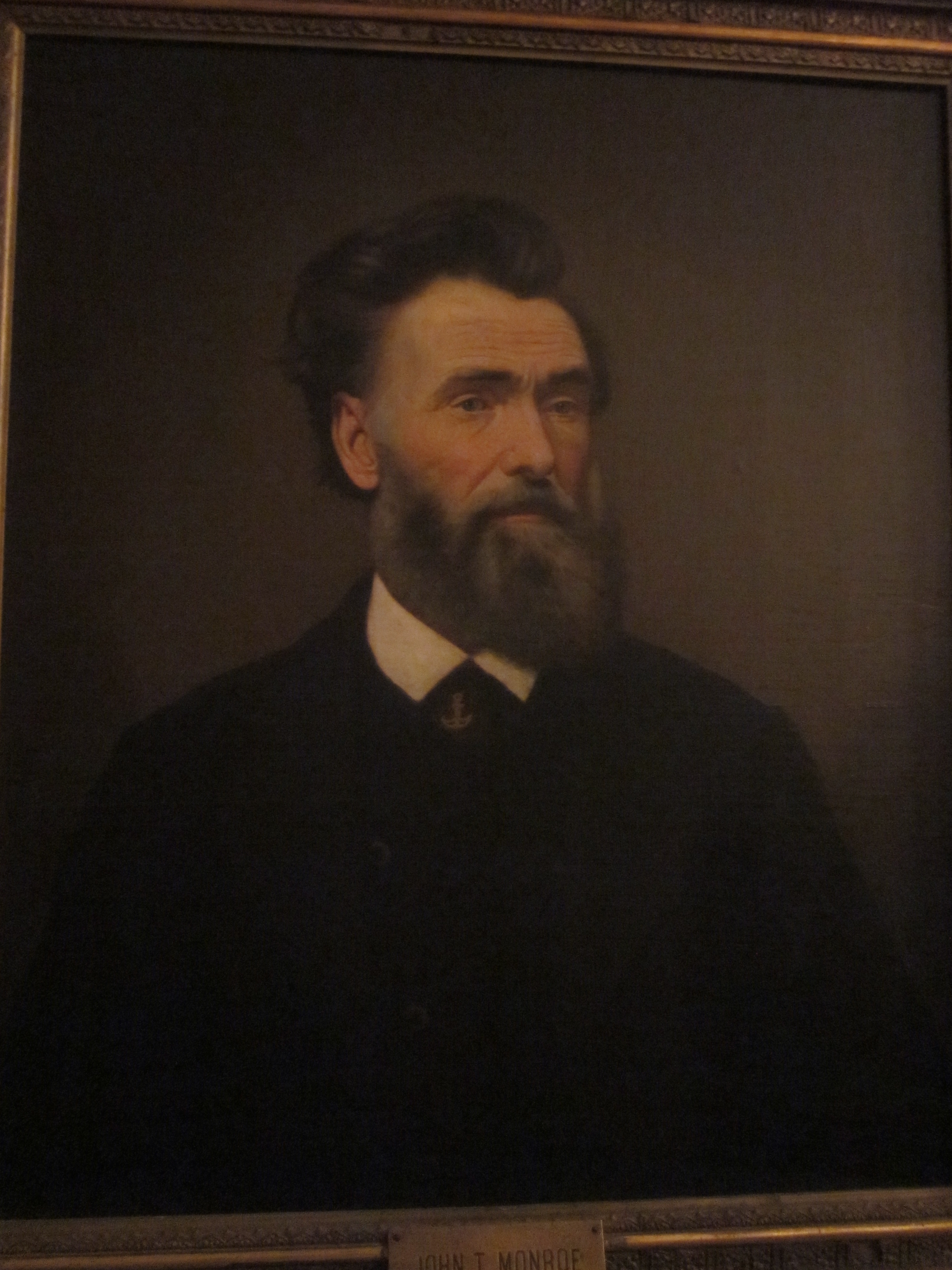
- Portrait of Monroe in Gallier Hall, New Orleans

21st Mayor of New Orleans
- In office June 18, 1860 – May 16, 1862
- Preceded by: Gerald Stith
- Succeeded by: George Foster Shepley (acting)
- Acting; October 2, 1862 – January 30, 1863
- Preceded by: Godfrey Weitzel (acting)
- Succeeded by: James F. Miller (acting)
- In office May 12, 1866 – March 28, 1867
- Preceded by: George Clark (acting)
- Succeeded by: Edward Heath

Personal details
- Born: John Thompkins Monroe; May 6, 1822 Howard County, Missouri, U.S.
- Died: February 24, 1871 (aged 48) Savannah, Georgia, U.S.
- Resting place: Cypress Grove Cemetery, New Orleans
- Spouse: Rebecca Isadora Shepard
- Children: 9

John Thompkins Monroe (May 6, 1822 – February 24, 1871) was an American politician who served as the 21st mayor of New Orleans from 1860 to 1862 and from 1866 to 1867. He served as acting military mayor during the American Civil War from 1862 to 1863.

== Early life and career ==
He was born in Howard County, Missouri. His father was Daniel Munro. Monroe moved to New Orleans in 1837, working as a stevedore, and soon became a prominent labor leader. In 1858 he was elected Board of Assistant Aldermen, representing the 2nd Ward.

== Political career ==
=== First term ===
The 1860 campaign for mayor attracted little notice in New Orleans, as all attention was on the Presidential contest. There were three candidates; John T. Monroe, Alexander Grailhe, and Lucius W. Place. Monroe, the nominee of the Native American Party, represented the current administration. Grailhe, an independent, was essentially the anti-administration candidate, who he held responsible for the poor condition of the city. The newspapers of the time were filled with complaints about the stagnant gutters, the weeds that grew along the streets, and the air of general neglect. However, Monroe was elected with 37,027 votes. Grailhe received a much smaller number, and Place hardly any.

=== Federal capture of New Orleans ===
There is a story about the Civil War that the white leadership of New Orleans was captured, but never surrendered.

This is a letter written by William Preston Johnston:

"The capture of New Orleans in April 1862 by Captain David Farragut and General Benjamin Butler brought the name of mayor Monroe before the whole country and the people of the then Confederate States and the United States. It soon spread to British journalism and into British Parliament.

"At the approach of the federal fleet, on the morning of April 25, Mayor Monroe, determined to hoist the flag of the State of Louisiana over the City Hall. At his request, his private secretary, Mr. Marion A. Baker, descended to the roof of the building and prepared to execute the mayor's orders, with the instructions to await the issue of the possible conflict at Chalmette.

"When he heard that the defenses had failed Monroe ordered the flag hoisted.

"Forthwith, two officers of the United States Navy presented Farragut's formal demand for the city's surrender and to lower their flag. Monroe stated that he had no authority to surrender the city and that General Mansfield Lovell was the proper official to receive and to reply to that demand. He refused to lower the flag.

"Monroe then sent for Lovell and while awaiting his arrival, conversation went on. Captain Bailey expressed regret at the wanton destruction of property, which he had witnessed and which he regarded as a most unfortunate mistake. To this, Monroe replied that the property was the Confederates' own and that they had a right to do as they pleased with it, and that it was done as a patriotic duty.

"Subsequently, Lovell also refused to surrender the city or his forces and stated that he would retire with his troops and leave the decision to the civil authorities. The question of surrender being thus referred back to him, Monroe said he would submit the matter to the Council and that a formal reply would be sent as soon as their advice could be obtained. The Federal officers then withdrew, with an escort furnished by Lovell.

"Monroe sent a message to the Council who met at 6:30 that evening. As civil magistrate, he held that he was incompetent to the performance of a military act. 'We yield to physical force alone,' said the Mayor, 'and maintain our allegiance to the Government of the Confederate States. Beyond a due respect for our dignity, our rights and the flag of our country, does not, I think permit us to go.'

"The Council, unwilling to act hastily, simply listened to the reading of this message and adjourned until 10:00 A. M. the next day. That evening, Monroe asked Baker and Police Chief McClelland, to go to the USS Hartford as early as possible the next morning and explain to Farragut that the Council would meet that morning and a written answer to his demand would be sent as soon as possible after the meeting.

"The Council met and listened to a second reading of the Mayor's message. Both the Council and the population of the city concurred in the sentiments expressed by Monroe and urged that he be act in the spirit manifested in his message. Anticipating such a result, a letter had already been prepared, reiterating the determination neither to lower the State flag nor to raise the United States flag. The Mayor's secretary read this letter to the assembled Council and from expressions by some of the members, it seemed to be satisfactory, but shortly after Mr. Baker left, a message was brought to Mayor Monroe, asking his presence in the Council Chamber.

"The object of this summons was to obtain his consent to the substitution of a letter written by Soulé and read by one of the members of the Council. Relations between the Mayor and the Council had not been of a most harmonious character and wishing to conciliate them at this unfortunate time, Monroe acceded to their wishes.

"Before a copy of this letter could be made and sent to Farragut, two officers, Lieutenant Albert Kautz and Midshipman John H. Read were at the City Hall with a written demand for the 'unqualified surrender of the city, and the raising of the United States flag over the Mint, Custom-house and City Hall, by noon that day, Saturday, April 26 and the removal of all other emblems but that of the United States, from all public buildings.' Monroe acknowledged receipt of this last communication and promised a reply before two o'clock, if possible. In the meantime a large and excited crowd had gathered outside the City Hall. Monroe, fearing for the safety of the two Federal officers, had had the heavy doors of the City Hall closed and ordered a carriage to be stationed at the corner of Carondelet and Lafayette streets. Escorted by two special officers and Baker, the federal officers were conducted to a rear entrance and to the waiting carriage, while Monroe occupied the crowd in the front. As the carriage drove away, some of the crowd started up St. Charles street with the expectation of heading it off. The driver was ordered to whip up his horses and to turn into Julia street and then drive posthaste to the river. The pursuers were armed, but the carriage went by so rapidly that they had no opportunity to fire and the party reached their ship without violence.

"The police force being inadequate for the preservation of order, Monroe called upon the European Brigade for assistance. This organization was made up of foreign residents and commanded by General Paul Juge Jr. Juge then issued a proclamation, by order of the mayor, asking for the aid of all good citizens in the preservation of order. The mayor was thus constituted commander-in-chief of army and of the civic forces. The City Hall became sort of military headquarters. Requisitions were issued for arms, horses, provisions for the home brigade and orders for transportation for Confederate troops en route from outlying fortifications to Lovell's headquarters at Camp Moore. Martial law reigned, and Monroe improvised a military court, Soulé being appointed Advocate.

"A communication received from Farragut, on Monday, stated that due to evidences of insubordination on the part of citizens and authorities, the fire of the fleet might be drawn on the city at any moment. 'The election is with you,' said Farragut, 'and it is my duty to notify you to remove the women and children within forty-eight hours, if I have rightly understood your determination.' Reading the message, Mr. Monroe said: 'As I consider this a threat to bombard the city, and as it is a matter about which the notice should be clear and specific, I desire to know when the forty-eight hours began to run.'

"'It begins from the time you receive this notice,' Captain Bell replied.

"The mayor, looking at his watch, noted 'You see it is fifteen minutes past twelve,' and renewed his refusal to lower the flag of Louisiana. 'This satisfaction,' he said, 'you cannot obtain from our hands. We will stand your bombardment, unarmed, undefended, as we are.'

"The forts surrendered and on April 29, 1862, Farragut dispatched a message informing Monroe of his intention to take formal possession of the city and that he was about to raise the United States flag over the mint, customhouse and still insisted that the lowering of the flag over the City Hall should be the work of those who had raised it.

"Monroe at once issued a proclamation asking all citizens to retire to their homes during acts of authority which would be folly to resist and impressed upon them the consolation that the flag was not to be removed by their authority, but by those who had the power to exercise it.

"Farragut sent a detachment of sailors and marines ashore. Protected by two howitzers, the landing party, raised the flag over the customhouse, proceeded to Lafayette Square and the City Hall. The marines formed a line on the St. Charles street side of the Square near the railing then enclosing it, while the guns were drawn through the gates, into the middle of the street and placed so as to command the street either way.

"The silent, angry crowd formed a compact mass both above and below the Square, many openly displaying arms. The Federal forces being stationed, Bell and Lieutenant Kautz entered the City Hall and the Mayor's office. Bell told Monroe: 'I have come in obedience to orders to haul down the State flag from this building,' Monroe replied: 'Very well, Sir, you can do it; but I wish to say that there is not in my entire constituency, so wretched a renegade as would be willing to exchange places with you.' Bell then asked that he might be shown to the roof. Monroe referred him to the janitor whom he would find outside.

"Fearing that some excited person in the crowd might commit some rash action and thereby bring disaster to the many assembled, the Mayor placed himself in front of the cannon pointing down St. Charles Street. Folding his arms, he fixed his eyes upon the gunner who stood, lanyard in hand, ready for action. There the Mayor remained, without once looking up or moving, until Kautz cut the halyards with his sword pulled down the flag and he and Bell reappeared. At an order from the Federal officers, the sailors and marines retired as they had come.

"The following day, Captain Farragut informed Mr. Monroe that there would be no further negotiations between them as General Benjamin Butler had arrived and would take charge. That same afternoon, two companies of Federal troops were placed around the City Hall and sentries posted at the doors. One of Butler's officers went in to invite Mayor Monroe to come to headquarters. Mr. Monroe, as usual, maintaining his dignity, refused to go to the St. Charles Hotel, except as a prisoner, insisting that the City Hall was the proper place to transact city business but up on advice from the City Council, he decided to yield and taking the Chief of Police with him, went to the Hotel. General Butler told Mayor Monroe he had come to restore the state and city to the Union and asked his co-operation in the management of the city, but the Mayor was not in a co-operative mood, and was giving as he had written to Farragut, only that submission which the conqueror is able to extort from the conquered. He replied that he must be allowed to administer the city alone or give it up entirely.

"A conference was arranged in which the Mayor, the Council and Mr, Soulé met with General Butler and his staff. General Butler then read his first proclamation as commander of New Orleans.

"On May 16, 1862, Butler issued his infamous Order No. 28. As soon as it appeared, Monroe protested to Butler in an impassioned letter. 'I had not anticipated,' he wrote, 'a war against women and children, whose only offense had been to show displeasure at the occupation of an enemy. And to give license to your officers and soldiers to commit outrages such as are indicated in your order, is in my judgment a reproach to the civilization, not to say the Christianity of the age in whose name I make this protest.'

"Summoned before Butler, the mayor was told that the language of his letter could not be tolerated and if peace in the city could not be restored by him, he would be imprisoned in Fort Jackson. Monroe replied his wish was to vindicate the honor of the virtuous women of the city. Butler stated that the order was not directed at such persons. Satisfied with this explanation, Monroe signed an apology for his letter, but the next day appeared at Butler's office to withdraw his apology. Again, apparently satisfied by Butler's promise to publish the letter and apology with a statement from Butler that the order applied only to ladies who offered insult, Monroe left. Shortly after, Monroe asked for a second time to withdraw the apology and sent another letter similar to the first one. Butler then called the mayor and several others to his office and ordered the mayor, his secretary, the Chief of Police and Judge Kennedy to be sent to Fort St. Philip. Monroe was later sent to Fort Pickens."

== Suspended from office ==
Upon Monroe's imprisonment, Butler appointed Brigadier General George F. Shepley, Military Commandant of New Orleans.

Refusing to take the oath of allegiance, Monroe was at one time consigned to solitary confinement and was for six months made to wear the ball and chain. While he was at Fort St. Philip, his young son fell terminally ill. Mrs. Monroe applied to Butler for the release of her husband, in order that he could be at the bedside of his dying child. Butler sent word that if Monroe would take the oath of allegiance he might come to the city and see his child, but the offer was declined and the child died without him.

The following year, Monroe was released. He went to Mobile and then to Richmond, where he was received by President Davis. Later he fixed his residence in Mobile, where he was taken prisoner by General Edward Canby. After the close of the war Monroe was arrested a third time, with no reason given by the Provost Marshal for his extraordinary proceeding and kept under surveillance for several months.

=== Second term ===
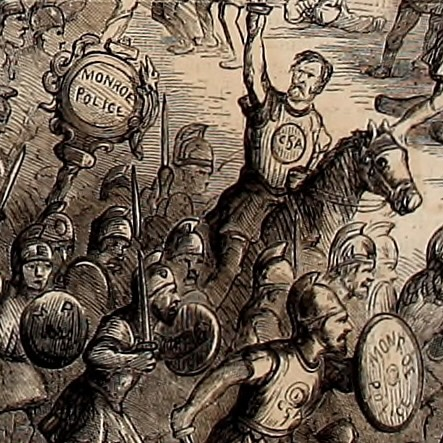
In Thomas Nast's Amphitheatrum Johnsonianum illustration of the New Orleans massacre of 1866, published 1867 in the Northern newsmagazine Harper's Weekly, John Monroe's breastplate reads CSA for Confederate States of America

After the reorganization of Louisiana, Monroe was reelected Mayor of New Orleans. He took office in March 1866. In March 1867, he was deposed by General Philip Sheridan under the Reconstruction Act of Congress, under the accusation that he had aided in the New Orleans massacre of 1866. In April Monroe visited Washington and was sympathetically received by President Andrew Johnson and Attorney-General Henry Stanbery, who promised his restoration to office and the removal of Sheridan. However, this promise was thwarted by later and more vigorous Reconstruction efforts.

== Retirement ==
Monroe moved to Savannah, where he died on February 24, 1871, at the age of 48. He had been a 33rd degree Mason, and was buried in Savannah with Masonic honors. In 1872 his remains were brought to New Orleans, where they were placed in the family tomb in the Cypress Grove Cemetery, beside the body of his favorite son.

== Personal life ==
Monroe was married to Rebecca Isadora Shepard (born 1826 in New Orleans); they had nine children.

Political offices
Preceded by Gerald Stith	Mayor of New Orleans; June 18, 1860 – May 16, 1862	Succeeded by George F. Shepley
Preceded by George Clark	Mayor of New Orleans; May 12, 1866 – March 28, 1867	Succeeded by Edward Heath
