= Edward Heath (disambiguation) =

Edward Heath (1916–2005) served as Prime Minister of the United Kingdom from 1970 to 1974.

Edward or Ted Heath may also refer to:

- Edward Bayard Heath (1888–1931), American aircraft engineer
- Edward Heath (New Orleans) (1819–1892), mayor of New Orleans from 1867 to 1868
- Ted Heath (bandleader) (1902–1969), British musician and big band leader
- Eddie Heath, British football scout accused of child abuse
