= François Joseph LeBreton Dorgenois =

American politician

François Joseph LeBreton Dorgenois was the eighth mayor of New Orleans, Louisiana, serving for less than a month at the end of 1812. The reason for his short stint as mayor is unknown.

Dorgenois was a descendant of Denis d'Envrich, who fought in the Battle of Fornoue in 1495 and was bestowed the name of LeBreton by Charles VIII of France. He also descended from Nicolas Chauvin de la Freniere and Pierre-Charles Le Sueur and was related to the LeMoyne brothers, Iberville and Bienville.

Political offices
Preceded by Nicolas Girod	Mayor of New Orleans; November 6, 1812 – December 4, 1812	Succeeded by Nicolas Girod
