= George Clark (New Orleans) =

American politician

George Clark was the 31st mayor of New Orleans (March 20, 1866 – May 11, 1866).

Political offices
Preceded by J. A. D. Rozier	Mayor of New Orleans; March 20, 1866 – May 11, 1866	Succeeded by John T. Monroe
