= Hugh Kennedy (New Orleans) =

27th mayor of New Orleans

Mayor of New Orleans
- In office March 21, 1865 – May 5, 1865
- Preceded by: Stephen Hoyt
- Succeeded by: Samuel Miller Quincy
- In office June 28, 1865 – March 18, 1866
- Preceded by: Glendy Burke
- Succeeded by: J. A. D. Rozier

Personal details
- Born: Hugh Kennedy; July 1, 1810 Belfast, United Kingdom of Great Britain and Ireland
- Died: May 19, 1888 (aged 77) Louisville, Kentucky, U.S.
- Resting place: Cave Hill Cemetery, Louisville
- Spouse: Annie White (m. 1859)
- Children: 3

Hugh Kennedy (1810–1888) was the appointed mayor of New Orleans (March 21, 1865 – May 5, 1865 and June 28, 1865 – March 18, 1866), as well as a journalist and businessman. His brother was Samuel H. Kennedy, proprietor of S.H. Kennedy & Co., president of The Louisiana State Bank, member of the New Orleans Board of Liquidation and president of The Boston Club. Kennedy was the first civilian mayor of the city since its occupation during the early years of the Civil War.

Kennedy was born in Belfast in 1810 and after studying law in London migrated to New Orleans via New York in 1833 where he began working as a druggist.

From the 1850s to 1864, Kennedy was editor and publisher of the True Delta daily newspaper until 1864. The True Delta was a Unionist paper that split from the older Delta newspaper in 1849. It was the first paper to welcome the Union forces that captured New Orleans in 1862, and Kennedy was described as being in the "Anti-Jeff Davis Party of the Confederacy." An Irishman who was well aware of the strength of the Know Nothings in the city before the Civil War, Kennedy welcomed the Union commander Benjamin Butler to the city, pointing to his prior resistance to Know Nothings in Massachusetts.

In May 1865, as part of the restoration of civilian government to the city, Kennedy was appointed mayor of New Orleans by Governor James Madison Wells. General Nathaniel P. Banks, concerned that opponents of Reconstruction were gaining too much power, ousted Kennedy from office and replaced him with Colonel Samuel Miller Quincy from Massachusetts as "military vice-regent." Wells appealed the decision to President Andrew Johnson, who removed Banks. By June 28, Kennedy had resumed his position as mayor. During his time as mayor, Kennedy granted several new companies franchise agreements to operate streetcar railways.

After serving as mayor, Kennedy invested in the city's growing streetcar business, becoming president of the Crescent City Railroad Company in 1875. He later move to Kentucky to invest in coal mining and died in Louisville on May 19, 1888.

== Notes ==
Political offices
Preceded by Stephen Hoyt	Mayor of New Orleans; March 21, 1865 – May 5, 1865	Succeeded by Samuel Miller Quincy
Preceded by Glendy Burke	Mayor of New Orleans; June 28, 1865 – March 18, 1866	Succeeded by J. A. D. Rozier
