= Abdiel Crossman =

Mayor of New Orleans (1846-1854)

Abial Crossman
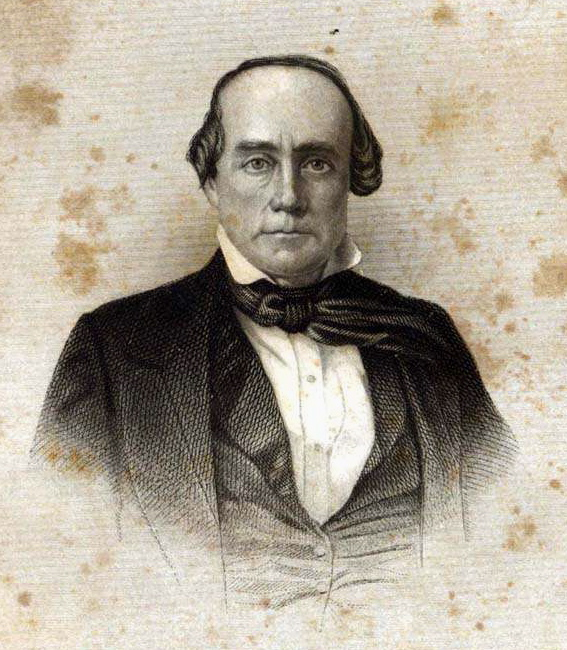

16th Mayor of New Orleans
- In office May 11, 1846 – March 26, 1854
- Preceded by: Joseph Montegut
- Succeeded by: John L. Lewis

Member of the Louisiana House of Representatives
- In office 1845–1846

Personal details
- Born: 1804 Greene, Maine, U.S.
- Died: June 13, 1859 (aged 54–55) New Orleans, Louisiana, U.S.
- Party: Whig

Abial Daily Crossman (1804 – June 13, 1859) was Mayor of New Orleans from April 6, 1846 to March 26, 1854, having served four consecutive terms. He was the second and last Whig mayor of the city, and notably served as mayor during the Mexican–American War.

== Early life and education ==
His family came from Massachusetts and was of old Puritan stock. He was born in the town of Greene, Maine. What instruction he had was obtained from his parents, who, at night, taught him a little reading, writing, and arithmetic. By his own efforts, however, he later acquired a good education. The father was a hatter by trade and brought his son up to follow the same business. Crossman left home at an early age to seek his fortune in the cities. He went first to Philadelphia but in 1829 moved to New Orleans, where he arrived with only five dollars in his pocket.

== Career ==
He managed to open a small shop in Canal Street, at the time a very poor location. His business succeeded almost immediately, however, and it was not long before he was one of New Orleans' more respected merchants, becoming a director in several banks and an officer of some of the more prominent benevolent societies.

In 1844 Crossman was elected to the State Legislature, becoming also a member of the Council of the First Municipality. He advanced to the post of chairman of the finance committee, a position which had been abandoned by several able men, on account of the difficulties which the management of the local finances were beginning to develop. Crossman set to work to reduce expenses and increase revenues, with such success that he was soon able to put the credit of the municipality upon a secure basis. It was this proof of administrative talent that led to his nomination for mayor, by the Whig Party in 1846.

== Electoral history ==
The election, held on April 5, 1846, gave Crossman a plurality of 2,989 votes, against two other candidates who split the Democratic Party vote, Guirot with 2,743, and former mayor Joseph Edgard Montegut with 1,614. By the end of his first term, Crossman had been so successful that he handily won his next election on April 3, 1848, 5,090 votes to 2,986 for the sole opposing candidate; his third term was secured by a much harder fought victory, with 4,984 votes to 4,452 for Bell, the Democratic candidate. His fourth and final term was the hardest fought, with 4,993 votes going to Crossman and 4,877 to his opponent Lewis, the candidate of a new reform party. In general, his power base was the older quarter of town, which for most of his tenure was represented by the First Municipality.

== Tenure ==
The salient events of Crossman's long administration were the patriotic and military enterprises undertaken in the city in connection with the war in Mexico; the flooding of the city in 1849, caused by a break in one of the levees; the Spanish riot of 1851; yellow fever epidemics in 1852 and 1853, the worst in the city's history to date; and the new city charter, in which the three-municipality system was abandoned for a return to a single, efficient government.

During the war New Orleans was the chief military depot of operations against Mexico. The streets were constantly filled with recruits on their way to join their commands at various stations in the West. With them came many undesirable characters, the control of whom imposed serious burdens on the city's small police force. Sick and destitute, also, collected in the wake of the army. Not only was the mayor called on to preserve order, but to devise methods whereby charity might effectively provide for the unfortunate. Benevolence was a conspicuous trait of Mayor Crossman's character; he threw himself into charity work with zeal and success.

The 1849 flooding of New Orleans was due to a break in a levee on the Sauvé plantation north of the city on May 3; by May 30, "Sauvé's Crevasse" had caused the inundation of 220 blocks and the displacement of 12,000 people. After the flood, much of New Orleans had to be repaved, drainage gutters replaced, and a new levee was built on Felicity Street.

On August 21, 1851, a serious riot broke out in New Orleans when it became known that a revolution led by General Narciso López had failed to take control of Cuba, and had been executed by the Spanish government: López having obtained much of his financial backing in New Orleans, a mob wrecked a number of Spanish-owned stores in the city and attacked the Spanish consulate. Rather than quell the riot, the city let it run; Spain was eventually compensated by the American government.t.

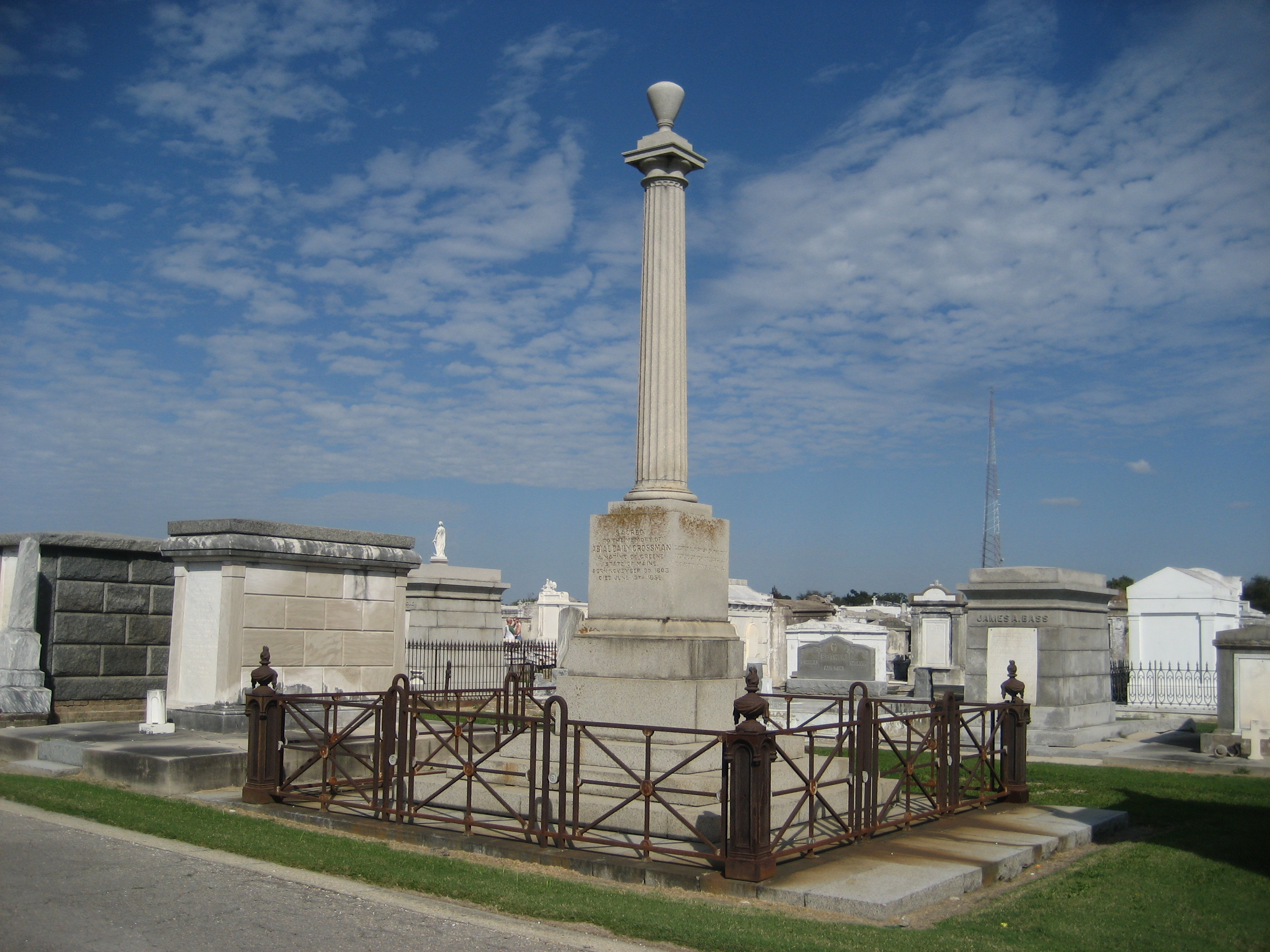
Tomb of Mayor Abial Crossman Greenwood Cemetery

April 12, 1852 may be considered the crowning date of Crossman's career. He had striven to repel the cumbersome three-municipality charter of the city, and succeeded when a new city charter was adopted on that date, reconsolidating the three municipalities (and incidentally annexing the suburb of Lafayette).t.

Crossman also worked to promote railroad links between New Orleans and the rest of the country, and to have the U. S. government establish a naval depot in town. At the end of his fourth term, in accordance with the provisions of the new city charter which prohibited the immediate reelection of a mayor, he stepped down; continuing, however, to serve New Orleans in various political capacities, chiefly as a member of the council.t.

== Death ==
Crossman died on June 13, 1859, in New Orleans and was buried in Greenwood Cemetery.

Preceded by Joseph Edgard Montegut	Mayor of New Orleans; 1846–1854	Succeeded by John Lewis
