= Nicholas Girod =

American politician

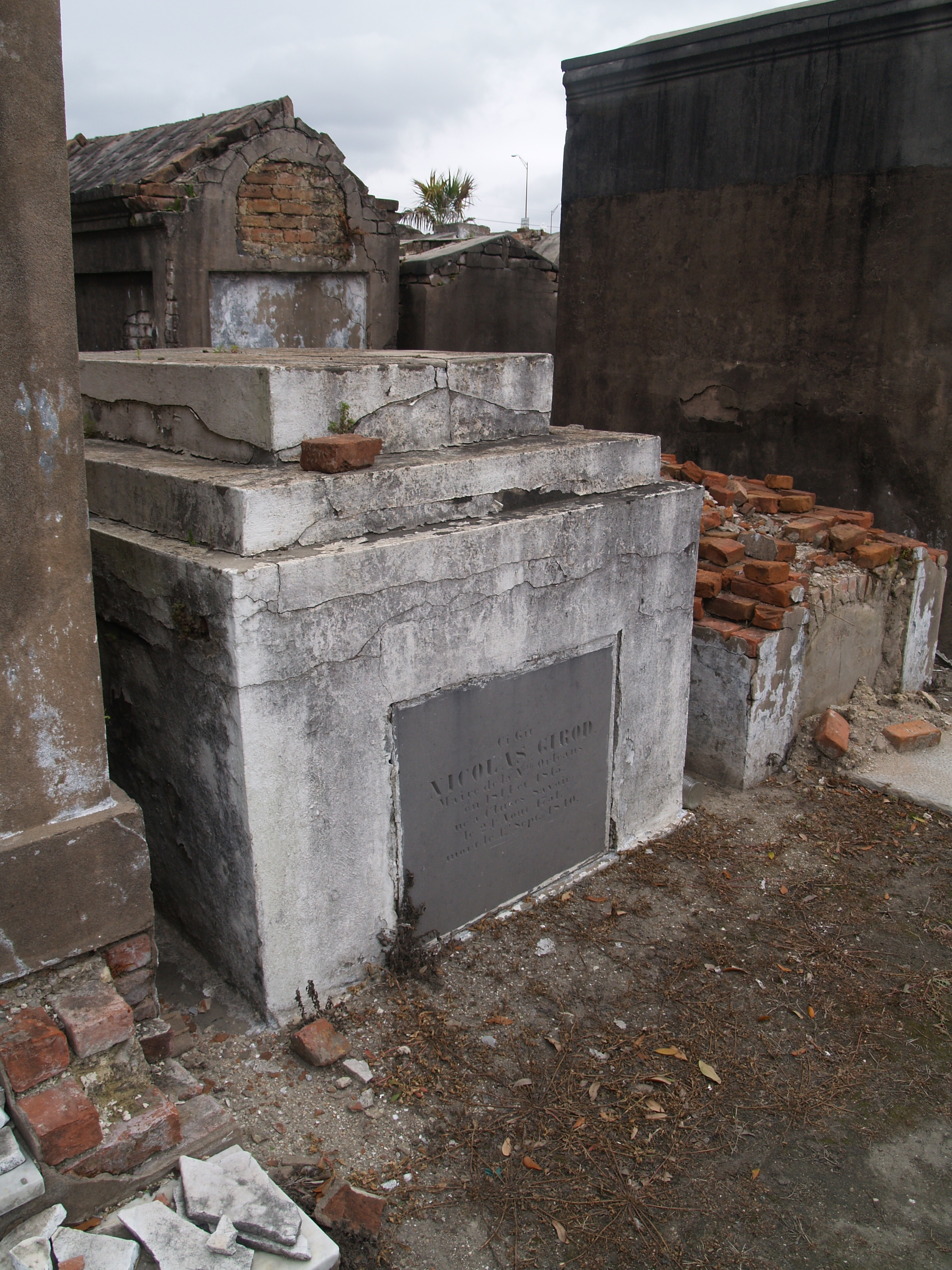
- Tomb of Nicolas Girod at Saint Louis Cemetery No. 2, New Orleans.

Mayor of New Orleans
- In office October 8, 1812 – November 5, 1812
- Preceded by: Charles Trudeau
- Succeeded by: François Joseph LeBreton Dorgenois
- In office December 5, 1812 – September 4, 1815
- Preceded by: François Joseph LeBreton Dorgenois
- Succeeded by: Augustin de Macarty

Personal details
- Born: April 1751, France Cluses, Kingdom of Sardinia
- Died: September 1, 1840 (aged 89) New Orleans, Louisiana, US
- Party: Democratic-Republican

Nicolas Girod (French spelling) or Nicholas Girod (April 1751—September 1840) was the fifth mayor of New Orleans, from late in 1812 to September 4, 1815. He was the first mayor of the city after Louisiana entered into the Union as a state.

== Biography ==
Nicolas Girod, born into a prominent family in Savoy, migrated to Spanish Louisiana in the late 1770s with his brother Claude François (1752-1813) and brother-in-law Andre-Marie Quetant and was later joined by brother Jean François (1773-1850). He prospered as a commission merchant and owner of extensive property in New Orleans, especially in the American quarter. They conducted commercial enterprises with area planters in what was known as the commission or factorage business. The Girods kept a wholesale and retail store in the vicinity of the levee landing, which in later years was transferred to the building at the corner of Chartres and St. Louis streets. He owned a large number of properties in the area of today's Central Business District, in the vicinity of Girod Street.

In 1812, He was the first regularly-elected mayor of New Orleans after Louisiana's admission to the Union. He was initially elected on September 21, 1812. Girod took office on November 5 of that year and served until September 4, 1814; at which date he was re-elected, resigning on September 4, 1815. He was briefly out of office in his first year, most likely due to illness, before retaking his position.

It was during his time in office that The War of 1812 broke out, and he prepared the city to defend itself against a British invasion force. He welcomed in General Andrew Jackson who declared martial law upon entering New Orleans in December 1814, having marched overland from present-day southern Alabama and then crossing Lake Pontchartrain. He ruled over the city until ending martial law in March 1815. After the Battle of New Orleans, Girod retired from politics and returned to manage his many businesses.

Girod was a noted philanthropist. Among other provisions in his 1837 holographic will, he left a bon (obligation) of $100,000 to be applied to the construction of a facility in Orleans Parish for the housing and care of Louisiana's French orphans. Other institutions and individuals were recipients under this will, including Charity Hospital, $30,000.

Nicolas Girod died on September 1, 1840, at his home located on the corner of Chartres and St. Louis streets. Both New Orleans and Mandeville, Louisiana, have a Girod Street, named in Nicolas Girod's honor. He never married and had no children.

== Plot to free Napoleon ==
New Orleans was full of excitement in the spring of 1821 when Girod remodeled and furnished a house he owned on Chartres Street, which he inherited from Claude Francois Girod, which is now known as the Napoleon House. Girod was one of the prominent financial sponsors of a plan to rescue Napoleon from his exile in Saint Helena and bring him back to live in New Orleans at the Napoleon House. The ship Seraphine was constructed and would sail out on its mission commanded by Capt. Bossier and Louisiana pirate Dominique You. The expedition set sail but returned when signaled by a French merchantman that Napoleon had died May 5, 1821.

== See also ==
- Battle of New Orleans
- Napoleon House
- Girod Street Cemetery

Political offices
Preceded by Charles Trudeau	Mayor of New Orleans; October 8, 1812 – November 5, 1812	Succeeded by LeBreton Dorgenois
Preceded by LeBreton Dorgenois	Mayor of New Orleans; December 5, 1812 – September 4, 1815	Succeeded by Augustin de Macarty
