= Gerald Stith =

American politician

Gerald Stith (born 1821) was the 18th mayor of New Orleans (June 21, 1858 – June 18, 1860).

Political offices
Preceded by Henry M. Summers	Mayor of New Orleans; June 21, 1858 – June 18, 1860	Succeeded by John T. Monroe
