= Kate Walker Behan =

American club leader (1851–1918)

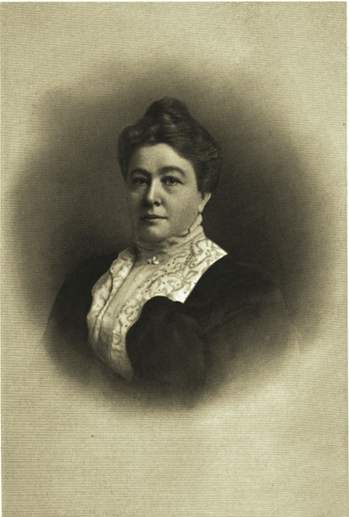
- Born: Kate Walker; 1851; New Orleans, Louisiana, U.S.
- Died: July 28, 1918 (aged 66–67); New Orleans, Louisiana, U.S.
- Resting place: Greenwood Cemetery
- Education: Old Ursuline Convent
- Occupation: club leader
- Known for: President General of the Confederated Southern Memorial Association
- Spouse: William J. Behan (m. 1865)
- Children: 2, including Bessie

Kate Walker Behan (1851 – July 28, 1918) was an American club leader, prominent in social, educational, and Confederate memorial affairs in the South for many years. She was president of the Confederated Southern Memorial Association, the Ladies' Confederate Memorial Association of Louisiana, and the Catholic Women's Club. Behan was also identified with the United Daughters of the Confederacy and the Lost Cause Myth. Born in New Orleans, she was also the first president of the Ursuline Alumnæ Association and the president of the Ladies Auxiliary of the House of the Good Shepherd.

== Early life and education ==
Kate ("Katie") Walker was born in New Orleans, Louisiana, in 1851. She was the only child of Mr. and Mrs. William Walker. Her family was wealthy.

In 1862, Behan entered the Old Ursuline Convent to pursue her studies, which had been interrupted by the start of the Civil War. She graduated in September 1865.

Starting in her childhood, Behan was active in Catholic Church work. She was a communicant of St. John's Church, a member of the Sodality of Our Lady, a helper of the Society of Saint Vincent de Paul, and part of the Altar and Sanctuary Society.

While she was still a girl during the Civil War, she took on responsibilities placed on the community and affiliated with the memorial societies of the 1860s, conducted by the women of the Confederacy.

== Career ==
While Behan lived in White Castle, she raised funds to erect and beautify of the Church of Our Lady of Prompt Succor. She collected money to improve the Ursuline Convent and the shrine at Our Lady of Prompt Succor. She assisted the Sisters of Charity when the organization gained responsibilities at the newly founded Lepers' Home near White Castle. Behan was the first president of the Catholic Women's Club and the Ursuline Alumnæ Association. She was the president of the Ladies Auxiliary of the House of the Good Shepherd and a member of St. Margaret's Daughters.

After the war, she continued her connection with the memorial societies till all the associations consolidated. She served as president of the Confederated Southern Memorial Association for many years and was affiliated with the Lost Cause Myth. It was mainly through her efforts that Jefferson Davis's name was restored to Cabin John Bridge, and a monument to his memory was erected in Washington, D.C. She helped secure money to erect the Jefferson Davis monument in Richmond, Virginia, and helped organize the Jefferson Davis Monument Association in New Orleans, serving as president in 1906. She was instrumental in legislative action to make his birthday, June 3, a legal holiday known as Confederate Memorial Day. She was deeply interested in the passage of the "Foraker Bill" in the United States Congress, which supported the perpetual care of the graves of the Confederate dead buried in Northern cemeteries.

Behan was affiliated with women's organizations and activities in New Orleans. She served as president of the Ladies' Confederate Memorial Association of Louisiana and the Catholic Women's Club. She was affiliated with the United Daughters of the Confederacy. She was chair of the home and education department of the Women's League in 1905 and conducted an educational campaign for the eradication of the yellow fever-bearing mosquito. During World War I, as chair of Branch No. 8 of the New Orleans Chapter of the American Red Cross, Behan worked at making surgical dressings, garments, and knitted articles. She also assisted with War Savings and Liberty Bond campaigns.

== Personal life ==
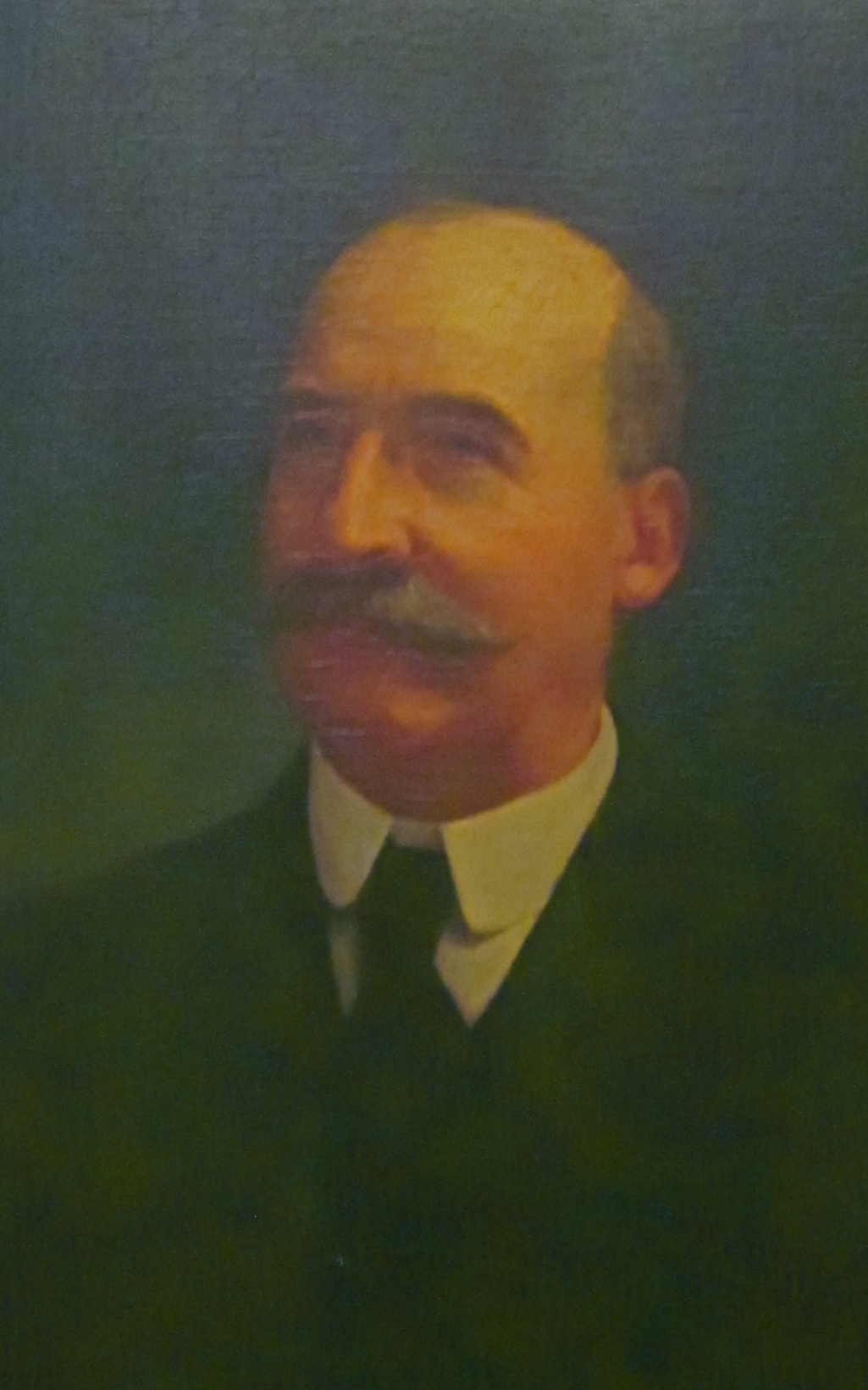
Mayor William J. Behan

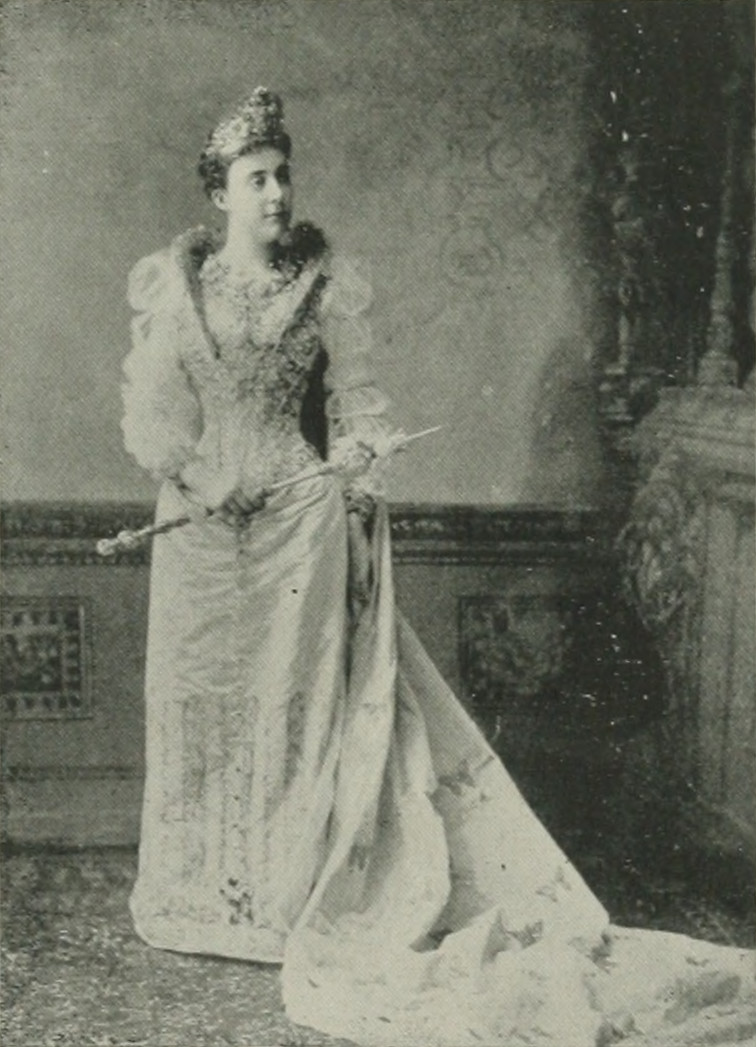
Bessie Behan, Mardi Gras Carnival Queen, 1891

In 1865, just after the Civil War, she married General William J. Behan, with whom she resided for many years at Alhambra, White Castle, Louisiana, and New Orleans. The couple had two daughters: Bessie (Mrs. Hampden Sidney Lewis) and Katherine (Mrs. André Dreux). She was an intimate friend of Varina Davis, Mary Anna Jackson, and Mary Anna Custis Lee.

== Death ==
After a brief illness, Behan died in New Orleans on July 28, 1918, at age 71. The funeral ceremony occurred at Notre Dame de Bon Secour Church. The flags of the City Hall and of the Memorial Hall were at half-mast in her memory. She was buried in Greenwood Cemetery.
