= John R. Conway =

American politician

30th Mayor of New Orleans
- In office June 10, 1868 – April 4, 1870
- Preceded by: Edward Heath
- Succeeded by: Benjamin Flanders

Personal details
- Born: August 24, 1825 Alexandria, Virginia
- Died: March 11, 1896 (aged 70) New Orleans, Louisiana
- Party: Democrat
- Spouse: Elize G. Waggeman

John R. Conway (1825-1896) was the 30th mayor of New Orleans (June 10, 1868 – April 4, 1870).

== Background ==
John R. Conway was born in Alexandria, Virginia, in 1825. In 1862, he moved to New Orleans and began work at a cotton commission house (which buys and sells cotton for a customer), but was soon fired due to the suspension of business in New Orleans by the occupying Union forces. However, in 1865, Conway, along with his brother, Colin, entered business again, now as a wholesale grocer and commission merchant.

== Politics ==
For quite a while, Conway had been greatly interested in politics, and considered active participation as part of his patriotic duty. After the Civil War, when the Orleans Parish Democratic Committee was reformed, Conway was named chairman. Conway worked with the Democratic State Central Committee to return control of the city back to the people, after several years of military control. Also during Conway's time as mayor, the city of New Orleans received a statue of Benjamin Franklin from neoclassical sculptor Hiram Powers.

== Personal life ==
On December 9, 1857 Conway married Elize G. Waggeman. The couple had two daughters. John R. Conway participated in many organizations, including the American Legion of Honor, the Chess, Checkers and Whist Club, the Board of Trade, the Chamber of Commerce, and was an organizer of the Sons of the Revolution. On March 11, 1896, at age 70, Conway died in his home in New Orleans, and was buried in the Cypress Grove Cemetery.
