= John L. Lewis (politician) =

American politician (1800–1886)

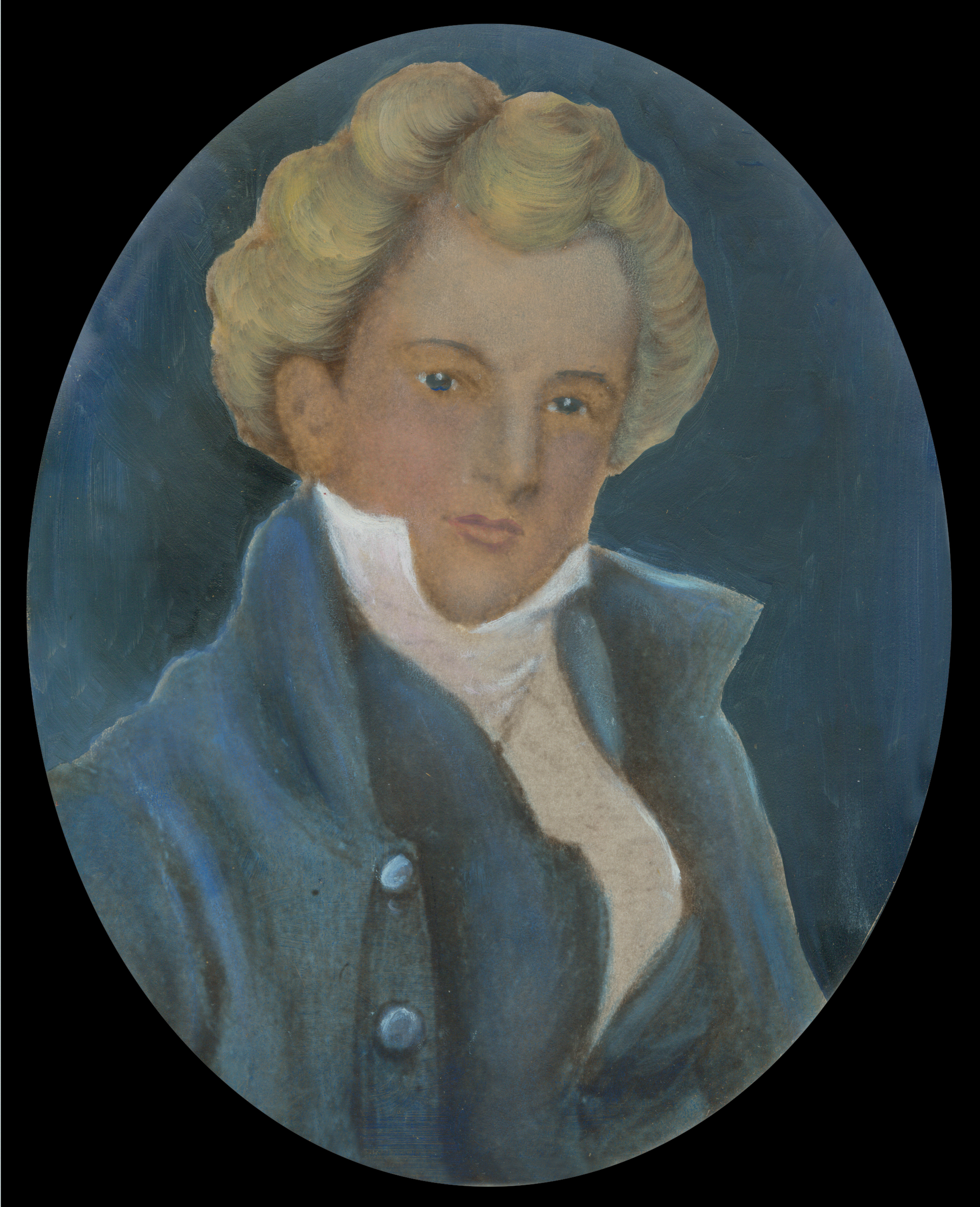

17th Mayor of New Orleans
- In office April 10, 1854 – June 17, 1856
- Preceded by: Abdiel Crossman
- Succeeded by: Charles M. Waterman

Personal details
- Born: John Lawson Lewis; March 26, 1800
- Died: May 15, 1886 (aged 86)

John Lawson Lewis (March 26, 1800 – May 15, 1886) was the 17th mayor of New Orleans (April 10, 1854 – June 17, 1856). He had previously served in the Louisiana State Senate and as sheriff of Orleans Parish. During the American Civil War, in the sixth decade of his life, Lewis served in the Confederate Louisiana Militia as a general.

== See also ==
- Joshua Lewis (judge), his father
- Thomas J. Lewis, his son
- Michael Monroe Lewis, his 2nd great grandson

Preceded by Abdiel Crossman	Mayor of New Orleans; April 10, 1854 – June 17, 1856	Succeeded by Charles M. Waterman
