= Samuel Miller Quincy =

American politician (1832–1887)

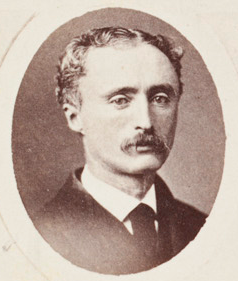

28th Mayor of New Orleans
- In office May 5, 1865 – June 8, 1865
- Preceded by: Hugh Kennedy
- Succeeded by: Glendy Burke

Personal details
- Born: June 13, 1832 Boston, Massachusetts
- Died: March 24, 1887 (aged 54) Keene, New Hampshire
- Resting place: Mount Wollaston Cemetery
- Education: Harvard University
- Occupation: Lawyer

Military service
- Allegiance: United States; Union
- Branch/service: Army
- Rank: Colonel; Brevet Brigadier General
- Commands: 2nd Massachusetts Infantry Regiment; 73rd U.S. Colored Infantry Regiment; 96th U.S. Colored Infantry Regiment; 81st U.S. Colored Infantry Regiment
- Battles/wars: American Civil War

Samuel Miller Quincy (/ˈkwɪnzi/; June 13, 1832 — March 24, 1887) was the 28th mayor of New Orleans and a Union Army officer during the American Civil War.

== Biography ==
Samuel Miller Quincy was born in Boston on June 13, 1832, the son of Josiah Quincy Jr., former mayor of Boston, and the younger brother of Josiah Phillips Quincy. He was a distant cousin of President John Quincy Adams and a descendant of Rev. George Phillips, who settled in Watertown, Massachusetts, in 1630.

He was also a Harvard graduate (1852), lawyer and legal historian, and Union soldier in the American Civil War, during which he was wounded, captured, imprisoned, and exchanged.

Shortly after the attack on Fort Sumter, Quincy was commissioned a captain in the 2nd Massachusetts Infantry Regiment on May 25, 1861. He was promoted to major on October 22, 1862, and to colonel on January 18, 1863. He resigned his commission on June 5, 1863, but was re-commissioned as the lieutenant colonel of the 73rd United States Colored Infantry Regiment on November 29, 1863, and was promoted to colonel in command of the regiment on May 29, 1864. He served briefly as Mayor of New Orleans from May 5 to June 8, 1865.

He transferred to the 96th US Colored Infantry Regiment on September 27, 1865, and was mustered out on January 21, 1866. The next day, he became the colonel of the 81st US Colored Infantry. He was honorably mustered out of service on November 30, 1866.

On February 21, 1866, President Andrew Johnson nominated Quincy for the award of the honorary grade of brevet brigadier general, United States Volunteers, to rank from March 13, 1865, for gallant and meritorious services during the war, The U.S. Senate confirmed the award on May 18, 1866.

He was a member of the Massachusetts Commandery of the Military Order of the Loyal Legion of the United States.

General Quincy died in Keene, New Hampshire on March 24, 1887.

== See also ==
- 1872 Massachusetts legislature

Political offices
Preceded by Hugh Kennedy	Mayor of New Orleans; May 5, 1865 – June 8, 1865	Succeeded by Glendy Burke
