= Henry M. Summers =

American politician

Henry M. Summers served as acting mayor of New Orleans from 5 June to 21 June, 1858, having been appointed following the impeachment and removal from office of Mayor Charles M. Waterman.

Summers died at age 52 on 23 June 1865.

Political offices
Preceded by Charles Waterman	Mayor of New Orleans; June 5, 1858 – June 21, 1858	Succeeded by Gerald Stith
