= Joseph A. Shakspeare =

American politician

Joseph Shakspeare
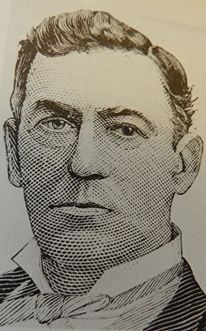

29th Mayor of New Orleans
- In office Dec 16, 1880 – Nov 20, 1882
- Preceded by: Isaac W. Patton
- Succeeded by: William J. Behan
- In office April 23, 1888 – April 25, 1892
- Preceded by: J. Valsin Guillotte
- Succeeded by: John Fitzpatrick

Personal details
- Born: April 12, 1837 New Orleans, Louisiana
- Died: January 22, 1896 (aged 58) New Orleans, Louisiana
- Party: Democratic
- Spouse: Antoinette Kroos
- Children: 5

Joseph Ansoetegui Shakspeare (April 12, 1837 – 22 January 1896) was an American politician in Louisiana; he served as the elected mayor of New Orleans from 1880 to 1882 and from 1888 to 1892. He previously was elected for one term in the state legislature. He was an iron worker.

== Early life and political career ==
Shakspeare was born in New Orleans in 1837, the son of Samuel Shakspeare, a Quaker from Delaware, and his wife Mariane Mathias, a Swiss immigrant. He studied iron design in New York City and later returned to New Orleans to run an ironworks started by his father. Shakspeare later entered politics, serving one term in the state legislature.

In 1863 he married Antoinette Kroos, a German immigrant. The couple had five children.

In the municipal election of 1880, Shakspeare accepted the mayoral nomination of a coalition of reformers determined to take power from the Ring, a scandal-plagued local Democratic political machine. Shakspeare defeated Jules Denis, the Ring candidate, by 9803 votes to 9362. For several days, outgoing Ring Mayor Isaac W. Patton refused to recognize the results. He would not give up City Hall until he was ordered to by a judge.

== First Shakspeare administration, 1880-1882 ==
Shakspeare's first two-year term as mayor was a difficult one. He was the only reformer elected, so he faced unending hostility from the seven-member City Council and administrative board, both still controlled by the Ring. Still, Shakspeare was able to overhaul the city's disorganized budget and managed to reschedule the crippling municipal debts left over from the Civil War and Reconstruction.

He increased the city's revenue by selling the Carrollton Street Railroad franchise and by devising the Shakspeare Plan: illegal gambling operations could operate, as long as they made regular payments to the city treasury. He attempted to reform the fire and police departments, by removing them as destinations for job seekers for political patronage but was thwarted by City Council. The city enacted a new municipal charter to replace the Reconstruction-era charter.

His new charter created a new thirty-member City Council with legislative power and increased the mayor's term of office from two years to four. His administration also commissioned construction of a monument to Confederate General Robert E. Lee. (This was installed in Lee Circle but has been moved). It also authorized the creation of a monument commemorating the Battle of Liberty Place of 1874, in which the white supremacist White League attempted to overthrow the Reconstruction-era Republican state government because of a disputed gubernatorial election.

Shakspeare did not run for re-election in 1882. He was followed in office by William J. Behan, the Ring candidate.

== Second Shakspeare administration, 1888-1892 ==
In the municipal election of 1888, Shakspeare ran again as a reform candidate opposing the Ring. As before, he was supported by members of the conservative Bourbon business elite. He defeated the Ring candidate, Judge Robert C. Davey, by 23,313 votes to 15,635. The election was characterized by the presence at polling places of armed bands of men from both the reform and Ring camps, who attempted intimidation.

Under the rules of the new charter, the mayoral term had been made to last four years. Shakspeare's second term was characterized by renewed street improvements, the introduction of electric street lights and street cars, and a further improvement of the city's debt situation. His administration began construction of a new courthouse and jail complex on Tulane Avenue. He also created a professional fire department to replace the existing volunteer fire departments, which had been active in municipal machine politics. However, his efforts to use the police department as a source of political patronage alienated some of his reform-oriented supporters. Shakspeare appointed David Hennessy as chief of police.

Hennessy's assassination in October 1890, allegedly by members of the Sicilian Mafia, sparked anti-Italian feeling. When numerous Italian suspects were acquitted at trial and others given a mistrial, a mob stormed the parish prison and murdered 11 of the 19 Italian suspects in what is known as the March 14, 1891 lynchings. The event was well organized by a small group, although a mob of thousands gathered outside the prison. The mass lynchings created an international diplomatic incident: the Italian consul to New Orleans and the Italian ambassador to the US at Washington, DC were both recalled by the Italian government, and for a time war seemed possible. Shakspeare's public hostility to Italian Americans after the murder, and the lynching which took place on his watch, and which he did nothing to prevent, tarnished his reputation.

Shakspeare ran for a third term in 1892, but was defeated by Ring candidate John Fitzpatrick, a popular politician with strong pro-labor credentials, who also benefitted from the Italian-American vote. Shakspeare died in New Orleans in 1896.

== Sources ==
- Profile of Shakspeare Administration
- Biographical Dictionary of American Mayors, 1820-1880. Greenwood Press, 1981.
- Jackson, Joy J. New Orleans in the Gilded Age: Politics and Urban Progress, 1880-1896. Louisiana Historical Association, 1997.
- Kendall, John Smith. History of New Orleans. Lewis Publishing Co., 1922.

Political offices
Preceded by Isaac W. Patton	Mayor of New Orleans; 1880–1882	Succeeded by William J. Behan
Preceded by J. Valsin Guillotte	Mayor of New Orleans; 1888–1892	Succeeded by John Fitzpatrick
