= Glendy Burke =

American politician

Glen D. Burke a.k.a. Glendy Burke was an American politician. He was the 29th mayor of New Orleans from June 8 to June 28, 1865.

He was born in Baltimore on December 31, 1805, the son of shipping executive David Burke. In 1826 he moved to New Orleans and began working for Abijah Fisk, a sugar and coffee merchant who left his house to the City of New Orleans and started the New Orleans Public Library. His company, called A. Fisk, Watt & Company, are credited with introducing coffee to New Orleans during the 1830s. Burke bought out Fisk in or around 1835 and the company was renamed Burke, Watt & Co. When Watt retired, the company was renamed as G. Burke & Co.

Political offices
Preceded by Samuel Miller Quincy	Mayor of New Orleans; June 8, 1865 – June 28, 1865	Succeeded by Hugh Kennedy
