= Stephen Hoyt =

Mayor of New Orleans

Stephen Hoyt was the 26th mayor of New Orleans (February 9, 1864 – March 21, 1865).

Political offices
Preceded by James F. Miller	Mayor of New Orleans; February 9, 1864 – March 21, 1865	Succeeded by Hugh Kennedy
