= J. Valsin Guillotte =

American mayor

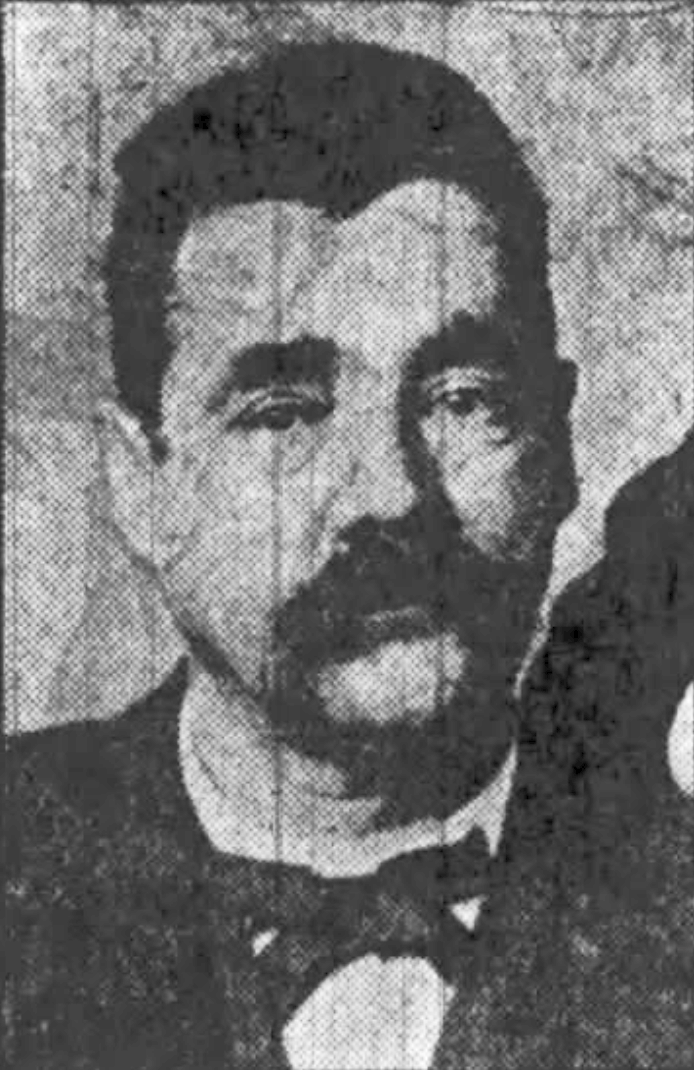
- Guillotte, from a 1917 obituary
- Born: June 29, 1850; Jefferson Parish, Louisiana, U.S.
- Died: June 24, 1917 (aged 66)
- Occupations: Politician, lawyer
- Known for: Mayor of New Orleans (1884-1888)

Joseph Valsin Guillotte (June 29, 1850 – June 24, 1917) was an American lawyer and politician. He served as the 42nd mayor of New Orleans, from April 29, 1884, to April 23, 1888. He also served two terms in the Louisiana State Senate.

Guillotte was born in Jefferson Parish, the son of William Guillotte and Pauline Schexnaildre Guillotte. He was married to Ezilda Bernard, and had seven children. His wife died January 14, 1917, in New Orleans, Louisiana, and he died in a few months later, at age 67.

Political offices
Preceded by William J. Behan	Mayor of New Orleans; April 29, 1884 – April 23, 1888	Succeeded by Joseph A. Shakspeare
