= Isaac W. Patton =

American politician

Isaac Patton
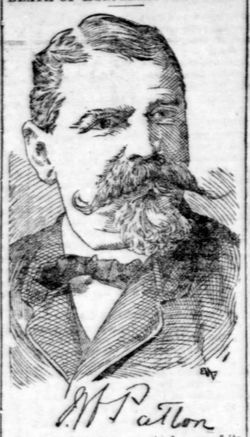

28th Mayor of New Orleans
- In office Nov 18, 1878 – Dec 16, 1880
- Preceded by: Edward Pilsbury
- Succeeded by: Joseph A. Shakspeare

Personal details
- Born: February 4, 1828 Fredericksburg, Virginia
- Died: February 9, 1890 (aged 62) New Orleans, Louisiana
- Party: Democratic
- Parent: John M. Patton (father)

Military service
- Allegiance: United States; Confederate States
- Branch/service: United States Army; Confederate States Army
- Years of service: 1846-1855 (USA); 1861-1865 (CSA)
- Rank: Colonel
- Battles/wars: Mexican-American War; American Civil War; Battle of Forts Jackson and St. Philip; Siege of Vicksburg (WIA); Battle of Mobile Bay; Battle of Spanish Fort

Isaac Williams Patton (February 4, 1828 – February 9, 1890) was an American soldier and politician who served as the 28th Mayor of New Orleans from 1878 until 1880.

== Early life ==
Isaac W. Patton was born in Fredericksburg, Virginia, the descendant of one of the first colonial families. His grandfather was Revolutionary War general Hugh Mercer, and his father was John Patton, a prominent lawyer and politician in the Richmond area. He was educated at the Fairfax Institute and then began studying law under his father at the age of nineteen. When the Mexican American War broke out, he put aside his studies and joined the Army. He was commissioned as a Second Lieutenant in the Tenth United States Infantry. By the end of the war in 1849, he was a Second Lieutenant in the Third Artillery and stationed in California. He served there until he resigned from the military in 1855 and returned to Virginia. That same year, he married Frances E. Merritt, the daughter of a doctor in Richmond. Two years after their marriage, the couple moved to St. Bernard Parish, Louisiana in order to manage a cotton plantation.

== Career ==
After moving to look over his cotton plantation, Isaac also began looking over a plantation owned by his father in law near the New Orleans area. At the beginning of the US Civil War Patton was elected captain of the Screwmen's Guard and ordered to take command of the battery at Chalmette near New Orleans. He was then elected Colonel of the Twenty-second Louisiana Infantry. When New Orleans fell to Federal troops in 1862, his unit withdrew to Camp Moore and then to Vicksburg. During the siege of Vicksburg he was wounded in the hip. After the surrender of Vicksburg he retreated to serve at Mobile Bay. He then fought at The Battle of Spanish Fort before he and his men finally surrendered in early May 1865, a month after General Lee's surrender at Appomattox Court House.

After the war, he returned to New Orleans and became a businessman and then entered into the cities political scene. In 1872, he was elected as sheriff, and by 1878, he had risen to become the chairman of the Democratic State Central Committee. Soon after, Governor Nicholls appointed Patton to be the Adjutant General of Louisiana. In 1878 he was elected Mayor of New Orleans and held this post for two years. The most important feature of Mayor Patton's administration was his management of the city's finances. His first step was to reduce the debt by fifty percent. He also made efforts to progress the construction of railroads which gave better access to the west and northwest, and improve sanitary conditions.

At the end of his term as mayor, Patton continued a life in politics. In 1884 he was elected as Treasurer of the city and he was later appointed as tax collector for the fourth district by Governor Nicholls. Patton died at the age of 62 at his home at No. 221 Washington Avenue between St. Charles Avenue and Prytania Street, and was survived by his wife and three sons.

Isaac Patton was a great-uncle of WWII General George S. Patton.

Political offices
Preceded by Edward Pilsbury	Mayor of New Orleans; November 18, 1878 – December 16, 1880	Succeeded by Joseph A. Shakspeare
