= Joseph Edgard Montegut =

American politician

Joseph Edgard Montegut (1806–1880) was the 15th mayor of New Orleans, Louisiana, serving from May 13, 1844, to April 5, 1846.

== Death ==
Montegut died in 1880 and has a grave at the St. Louis Cemetery.

Political offices
Preceded by William Freret	Mayor of New Orleans; May 13, 1844 – April 5, 1846	Succeeded by Abdiel Crossman
