= Regular Democratic Organization =

Conservative organization in New Orleans

The Regular Democratic Organization (RDO), also known as the Old Regulars or the New Orleans Ring, is a conservative political organization based in New Orleans. It has existed for 130 years and as of 2017 was still active.

The symbol of the RDO is the rooster. For many years the organization's headquarters was at the Choctaw Club.

== Reconstruction and aftermath ==
The RDO organized in the latter days of Reconstruction, toward the end of Republican Party control of the city. In 1876 the Democrats regained control of the state legislature, in part due to violent intimidation by the paramilitary White League of white and black Republicans to suppress voting. In 1877, the Democrats regained political power in New Orleans via the political muscle of the RDO. The RDO leadership enacted Jim Crow laws such as segregated facilities and a poll tax, similar to laws being enacted by the state legislature.

During the battle between the RDO and an alliance between Reform Democrat Mayor Joseph A. Shakspeare and biracial New Orleans Republicans, the RDO's two political bosses of the city's Italian-American community, Joseph Macheca and Frank Romero, fell victim to the 1891 New Orleans lynchings.

In 1896 RDO lent its support to the reelection of Governor Murphy J. Foster in order to stop a biracial alliance between the Republican Party and the Populists behind the candidacy of John N. Pharr. After an election characterized by fraud so widespread that the actual results may never be known, Foster maneuvered to rewrite the state constitution so as to disfranchise most black voters, related to similar actions by Mississippi and other former Confederate states through 1910. This resulted in several decades in which Louisiana and other states were effectively controlled by one political party, and blacks were closed out of the political process. Nomination by the white-controlled Democratic Party of the state or winning its primary was all that was tantamount to election.

== Early 20th century ==
RDO became a powerful political force in New Orleans and throughout Louisiana around the turn of the 20th century. It appealed to working-class and immigrant voters. According to author Garry Boulard in his 1998 book, Huey Long Invades New Orleans, one of the reasons for the Old Regulars' success was that they had jobs to dispense:

If you were willing to work for them, they could provide work for you: the city and sewerage board alone was worth more than four thousand jobs; there were jobs in the police and fire departments, jobs on public-financed construction projects, jobs hauling garbage, jobs working in city hall. Only through the Old Regulars could New Orleanians gain access to these jobs.

Like their political rivals the Citizen's League, the RDO had white supremacist leanings. The group exuded a tolerant attitude towards alcohol consumption, gambling, and prostitution.

Key leaders of the RDO were John Fitzpatrick and Martin Behrman, both of whom served terms as mayor during the organization's heyday.

In the 1920s, a schism formed in the ranks of the RDO, with the renegade faction taking on the name "New Regulars". The original RDO consequently was nicknamed the "Old Regulars". The New Regulars did not last long as an influential body, but the "Old Regulars" name stuck with the RDO. The RDO machine maintained control over New Orleans well into the 20th century, effectively selecting officials throughout city government from 1877 until 1934. With the exception of Joseph A. Shakspeare, every mayor of New Orleans from Edward Pilsbury up to and including T. Semmes Walmsley was endorsed and supported by the RDO.

== Feud with Huey Long ==
The RDO was involved in a costly feud with Louisiana politician Huey Long during the Walmsley period. Despite attempts at an alliance between the RDO and Long's statewide machine, the RDO ultimately lent strong support to the effort to impeach Long in 1929. The sides reconciled afterwards, leading to a period of productive cooperation between the camps until the alliance broke down in 1934. Heavy feuding resumed, which nearly reached armed confrontation. Long, with his statewide influence, managed to strip the RDO administration of New Orleans of most of its governing powers, eventually crippling the city. Walmsley rebuffed the RDO's request to step down to end the conflict, and the RDO (which also controlled the city council) abandoned him in return. Walmsley eventually resigned, leaving the RDO administration in turmoil.

After Long was assassinated in 1935, his allies in state government continued the siege on the RDO, which was opposed to Long's candidate for mayor, Robert Maestri. Long's machine struck a deal which led to Maestri becoming both mayor and head of the RDO. With the power of both Long's machine and the RDO at his behest, Maestri's government became increasingly corrupt.

== Reform ==
The election of Reform Democrat deLesseps Story Morrison to Mayor in 1946 marked the end of RDO hegemony in New Orleans. The RDO's defeat was due in large measure to behind-the-scenes workings of Louisiana governor Jimmie Davis and the Uptown New Orleans elite, who specifically sought to end the machine that had run New Orleans for six decades. The Democratic Party's switch to progressive principles in the late 1960s eroded the conservative RDO's residual influence in government, with the victory of integrationist Democrat Moon Landrieu for mayor in 1970 reflecting the liberal ascendancy. Correspondingly, RDO has maintained its initials while touting "Republicans, Democrats, Others" as alternative underlying words. RDO detached from the Democratic Party and began tactically endorsing candidates irrespective of partisan affiliation.

== Works cited ==
- Grantham, Dewey W. (1988). The Life and Death of the Solid South: A Political History. University of Kentucky Press. ISBN 0-8131-0308-8.
