= Edward Coke Billings =

American judge

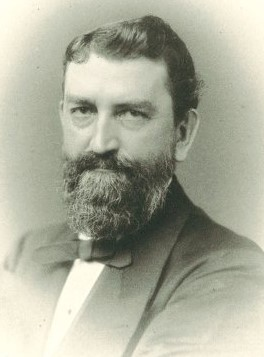

Judge of the United States District Court for the Eastern District of Louisiana
- In office March 3, 1881 – December 1, 1893
- Appointed by: operation of law
- Preceded by: Seat established by 21 Stat. 507
- Succeeded by: Charles Parlange

Judge of the United States District Court for the District of Louisiana
- In office February 10, 1876 – March 3, 1881
- Appointed by: Ulysses S. Grant
- Preceded by: Edward Henry Durell
- Succeeded by: Seat abolished

Personal details
- Born: Edward Coke Billings; December 3, 1829 Hatfield, Massachusetts
- Died: December 1, 1893 (aged 63) New Haven, Connecticut
- Education: Yale University; Harvard Law School (LL.B.)

Edward Coke Billings (December 3, 1829 – December 1, 1893) was a United States district judge of the United States District Court for the District of Louisiana and the United States District Court for the Eastern District of Louisiana.

== Education and career ==
Born on December 3, 1829, in Hatfield, Massachusetts, Billings graduated from Yale University in 1853 and received a Bachelor of Laws from Harvard Law School in 1855. He entered private practice in New York City, New York from 1855 to 1865. He continued private practice in New Orleans, Louisiana from 1865 to 1876.

== Federal judicial service ==
Billings was nominated by President Ulysses S. Grant on January 10, 1876, to a seat on the United States District Court for the District of Louisiana vacated by Judge Edward Henry Durell. He was confirmed by the United States Senate on February 10, 1876, and received his commission the same day. Billings was reassigned by operation of law to the United States District Court for the Eastern District of Louisiana on March 3, 1881, to a new seat authorized by 21 Stat. 507. His service terminated on December 1, 1893, due to his death in New Haven, Connecticut.

== Unsuccessful nomination ==
Billings was nominated by President Rutherford B. Hayes to the United States Circuit Courts for the Fifth Circuit on January 24, 1881, but the Senate never voted on his nomination.

== Sources ==
Legal offices
Preceded by Edward Henry Durell	Judge of the United States District Court for the District of Louisiana; 1876–1881	Succeeded by Seat abolished
Preceded by Seat established by 21 Stat. 507	Judge of the United States District Court for the Eastern District of Louisiana; 1881–1893	Succeeded by Charles Parlange
