= Charles M. Waterman (politician) =

American politician

- Born: c. 1809
- Disappeared: June 1860; New Orleans, Louisiana, U.S.
- Occupation: Politician
- Known for: 17th Mayor of New Orleans

Charles M. Waterman was an American politician. He was the 17th mayor of New Orleans (June 17, 1856 – June 3, 1858).

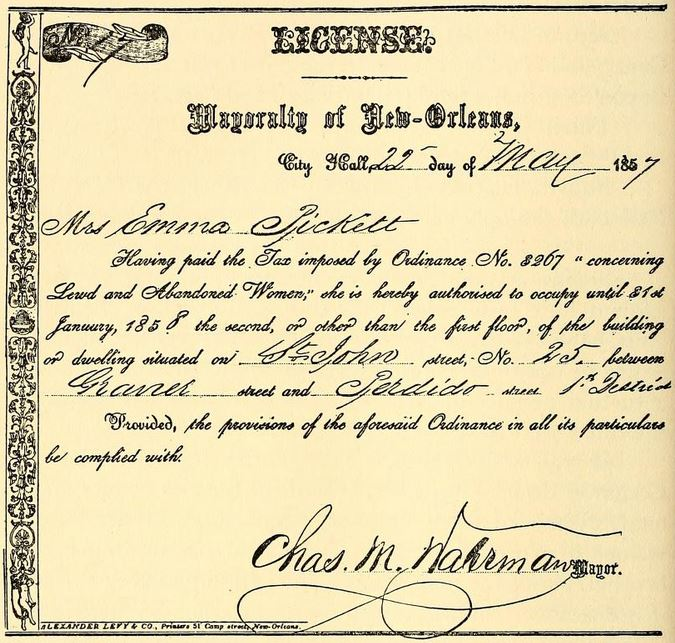
Mayor Waterman's signature on an 1857 brothel license

Waterman was nominated for mayor in 1856 as the Know Nothing Party candidate when he was about 47 years of age.

The New Orleans City Council impeached and removed Waterman from office on 3 June 1858. Henry M. Summers was appointed interim mayor, serving from 5 to 21 June.

Waterman disappeared in June 1860, possibly committing suicide by jumping into the Mississippi River, where his hat was later found on a ferry on the river.

== See also ==
- List of people who disappeared mysteriously (pre-1910)

Political offices
Preceded by John L. Lewis	Mayor of New Orleans; June 17, 1856 – June 3, 1858	Succeeded by Henry M. Summers
