= J. A. D. Rozier =

Mayor of New Orleans

Joseph Adolphus Rozier (died December 14, 1896) was an American politician and attorney who served as the 30th mayor of New Orleans for two days from March 19 to 20, 1866.

He was from a prominent family.

Political offices
Preceded by Hugh Kennedy	Mayor of New Orleans; March 19, 1866 – March 20, 1866	Succeeded by George Clark
