= Edward Heath (New Orleans) =

American politician

22nd Mayor of New Orleans
- In office March 28, 1867 – June 10, 1868
- Preceded by: John T. Monroe
- Succeeded by: John R. Conway

Personal details
- Born: 1819
- Died: 1892 (aged 72–73)
- Party: Republican

Edward Heath (c. 1819–1892) was mayor of New Orleans from March 28, 1867, to June 10, 1868. His tenure came during the Reconstruction of Louisiana, and required a stronger personality than he brought to the office. During his term, he faced budgetary and racial problems as well as attempts by the military authorities of the U.S. Federal government to ensure that the rights of African-Americans were respected. He was the first Republican mayor of New Orleans and, along with Benjamin Flanders, one of the only two.

Political offices
Preceded by John T. Monroe	Mayor of New Orleans; March 28, 1867 – June 10, 1868	Succeeded by John R. Conway
