= Edward Pilsbury =

American mayor

Edward Pilsbury (1824–1882) was the 38th mayor of New Orleans (December 19, 1876 – November 18, 1878).

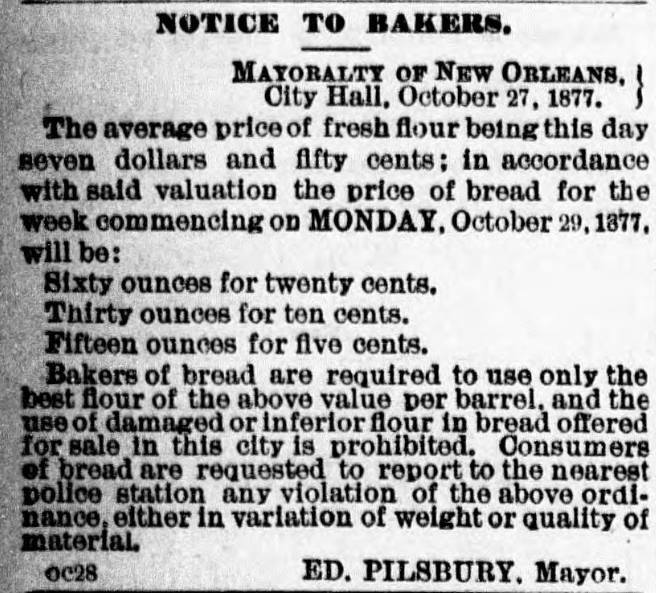
Notice to bakers regulating quality, size, and prices of bread from offices of Mayor Pilsbury, 1877

Political offices
Preceded by Charles J. Leeds	Mayor of New Orleans; December 19, 1876 – November 18, 1878	Succeeded by Isaac W. Patton
