= John Fitzpatrick (mayor) =

American politician (1844–1919)

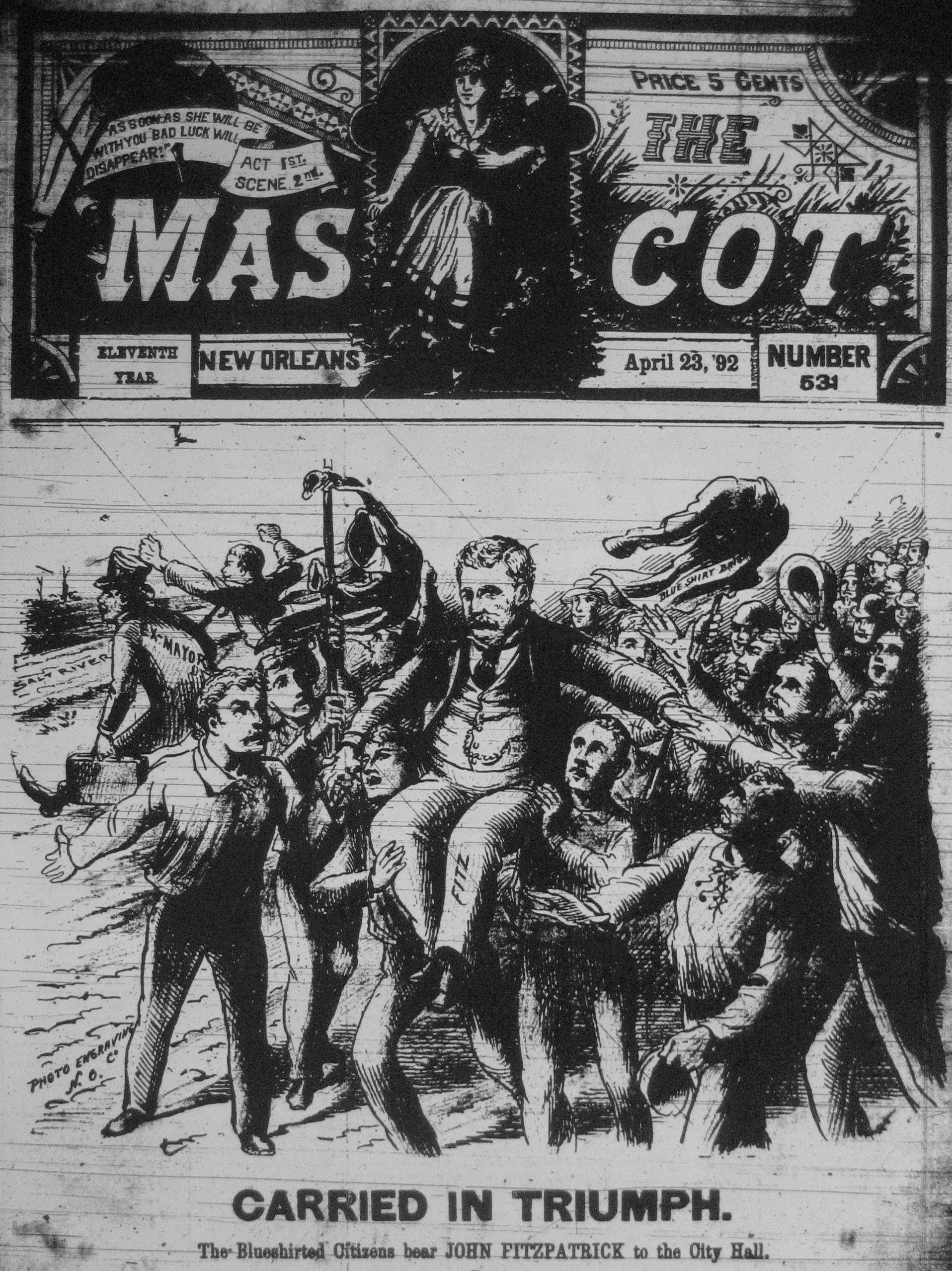

John Fitzpatrick (Fairfield, Vermont, May 1, 1844 – April 8, 1919) was an American mayor of New Orleans from April 25, 1892, to April 27, 1896.

== Early life ==
Fitzpatrick was born in Fairfield, Vermont when his mother was on a visit to the city. At the age of six months he was brought to New Orleans, Louisiana where he was raised. He later became an orphan, along with his two brothers James and Michael Fitzpatrick and were given shelter in the St. Mary's Orphan Asylum.

He received his education in the Louisiana public schools and started his career as a newspaper boy then moving onto being a carpenter.

== Political career ==
In 1872 Fitzpatrick was elected Clerk of the First District Court. In 1874, he was appointed Clerk of the Superior Criminal Court, holding that office until elected Criminal Sheriff in 1878. He was later elected Commissioner of Public Works.

== Family ==
He is the great-great-grandfather of comedian Tig Notaro.

Preceded by Joseph A. Shakspeare	Mayor of New Orleans; 1892–1896	Succeeded by Walter C. Flower
