= William J. Behan =

American politician (1840–1928)

William Behan
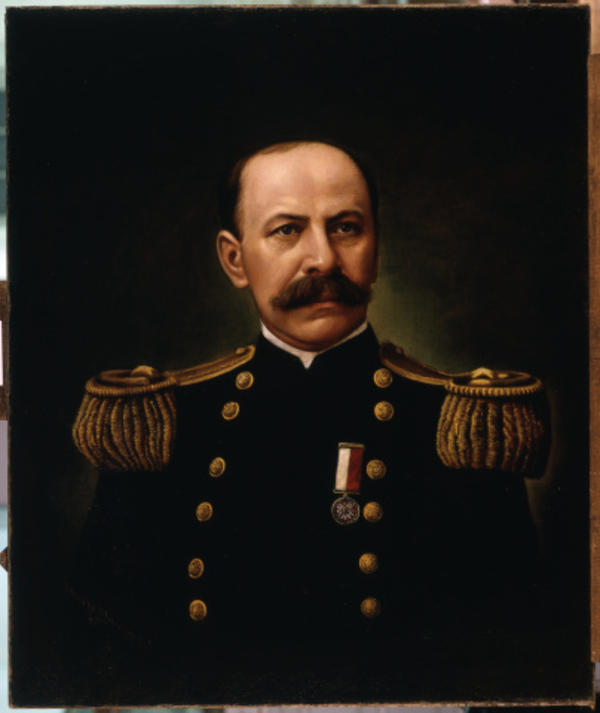
- 1893 portrait of Major William J. Behan

Mayor of New Orleans
- In office November 20, 1882 – April 28, 1884
- Preceded by: Joseph A. Shakspeare
- Succeeded by: J. Valsin Guillotte

Personal details
- Born: September 25, 1840 New Orleans, Louisiana
- Died: May 4, 1928 (aged 87) New Orleans, Louisiana
- Party: Republican (1884-1928)
- Other political affiliations: Democratic (until 1884)
- Spouse: Kate Walker (m. 1865)
- Children: 2, including Bessie
- Education: Western Military Institute

Military service
- Allegiance: Confederate States
- Branch/service: Confederate States Army
- Years of service: 1861–1865
- Rank: Major
- Unit: Washington Artillery
- Battles/wars: American Civil War

William J. Behan (September 25, 1840 – May 4, 1928) was an American Confederate veteran and politician. A military, business, and political leader, he served as the 41st mayor of New Orleans from November 20, 1882 to April 28, 1884.

== Early life and education ==
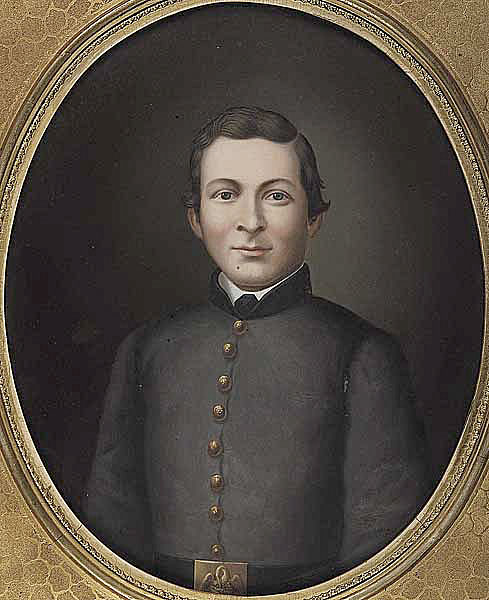
William Behan as an officer during the Civil War.

William James Behan was born in New Orleans, Louisiana, on September 25, 1840, to Irish immigrant parents, John Holland Behan and Katherine (née Walker) Behan who settled in New Orleans about 1835 and had deep family ties to the city. His father, an architect and builder, and active in real estate circles, died in Philadelphia in 1890.

William was the eldest of three boys, William J., Frank, and Isaac D. He received a liberal education at the Western Military Institute in Nashville, Tennessee, and the University of Louisiana (now known as Tulane University) of New Orleans.

Behan became Captain of the Mistick Krewe of Comus.

== Career ==
The Civil War absorbed his years as a young man. He enlisted as a sergeant in the Washington Artillery of the Confederate States Army of his native city, although he had been offered a captaincy in the infantry, in order to fight in company with his schoolmates and friends in an outfit composed of young men in New Orleans. He fought in the battles of Bull Run and Manassas, and was present at the surrender at Appomattox. His command was attached to the Army of Northern Virginia under General Robert E. Lee. He participated in all the campaigns of Virginia, Maryland, and Pennsylvania. At the close of the war, Behan was a lieutenant. He became a major in the CSA.

Mustered out, he returned to New Orleans and entered into business. His first position was as a clerk. He then entered the wholesale grocery business with Herman Zuberbier, under the firm name of Zuberbier & Behan, after having bought out Zuberbier's previous business partner. As the enterprise flourished, the partners organized the Crescent Jute Mills, manufacturing jute bagging. Behan retired from these enterprises when his partner died in 1903. In 1875, they had bought the Alhambra Plantation in Iberville Parish, Louisiana, situated on the Mississippi River, and the Granada Plantation, of which Behan became the sole owner in 1903, disposing of them just previous to World War I. He became one of the best known sugar planters of the South. He was director of several banks, and president of the Crescent City Railway Company, and vice-president of the New Orleans City and Lake Railway Company.

During Reconstruction, he endeavored to oppose what he saw as the inroads of carpetbaggers, and, commissioned general and second in command, he participated in the Battle of Liberty Place which attempted but failed to overthrow Louisiana's Republican state government under governor William Pitt Kellogg. He was appointed major general of the newly reorganized State National Guard and served from 1874 to 1882. Behan headed the implementation of the Crescent City White League. This white supremacist paramilitary group consisted of Confederate veterans who sought to keep Republicans from taking office. It was described by many to be the "military arm of the Democratic Party."

Behan's involvement in the formation of this led to his nomination from the Democratic Party for the Mayor of New Orleans. He won in what is considered a landslide political victory in the 1882 election. He became the first Mayor under the new city charter which had been adopted in the post-war period. In 1884, after two years in office, Behan lost his position. The popular vote in the election was thrown out and was deemed inconclusive by a group of influential politicians. He was then ousted by fellow Democrat J. Valsin Guillotte. Outraged by this decision, Behan left the party and joined the Republicans. In 1904, Behand ran as the Republican candidate for governor of Louisiana, but was defeated by Democrat Newton Blanchard. After the defeat, he stated that he would never strive to be Mayor of New Orleans for the rest of his life.

He was elected a member of the State Senate, holding office from 1888 to 1892. When the Louisiana Division of the United Confederate Veterans' Association was formed in 1889, Behan was chosen as major-general and served for two terms.

He served as chairman of the Republican State Executive Committee and as delegate to the Republican National Conventions of 1896, 1900, 1904, 1908, and 1912.

During World War I, he represented New Orleans, Louisiana, and the United States as commissioner to France to commemorate the 150th anniversary of the founding of Louisiana by the French. In 1917, he toured the battlefronts of the Aisne and Somme sectors, under the guidance of an artillery officer who was a descendant of the Marquis de Lafayette, as a courtesy of the French Government. When he returned to the U.S., Behan was active in work for the Red Cross and Liberty loans.

From 1905, he served as commander of the Washington Artillery Veterans' Association, president of the Pickwick Club, and first vice-president of the Louisiana Historical Society. He was a member of the Southern Yacht Club, the Jockey Club and the French Opera Association.

== Personal life ==
In 1865, Behan married Kate Walker, born in New Orleans, daughter of William Walker. The couple had two daughters: Bessie (later, Mrs. Lewis); and Katherine. (later, Mrs. André Dreux).

Behan died on May 4, 1928, on Jackson Avenue at his home in New Orleans.

== Sources ==
- "Administrations of the Mayors of New Orleans: Behan." Administrations of the Mayors of New Orleans: Behan. Louisiana Division, New Orleans Public Library, 19 Nov. 2002. Web. 26 Feb. 2013.
- Current, Richard N. The Confederacy: Selections from the Four-volume Simon & Schuster Encyclopedia of the Confederacy. New York: Macmillan Reference USA, 1998. Print.
- Hirsch, Arnold R., and Joseph Logsdon. "The People And Culture of New Orleans" New Orleans Online, n.d. Web. 1 Apr. 2013.
- Miller, Mike. Biographical and Historical Memoirs of Louisiana 2 (1997): 279-80.USGW Archives. Web. 25 Mar. 2013.
- "Mrs. William J. Behan Obituary." Louisiana Research Collection [New Orleans] 1920: n. pag. Print.
- Nystrom, Justin A. New Orleans after the Civil War: Race, Politics, and a New Birth of Freedom. Baltimore, MD: Johns Hopkins UP, 2010. Print.
- Solomon, Clara, and Elliott Ashkenazi. The Civil War Diary of Clara Solomon: Growing up in New Orleans, 1861-1862. Baton Rouge: Louisiana State UP, 1995. Print.
- United States of America. New Orleans. Office of the Mayor. Mayor Records 1862-1920. N.p.:Print.

Party political offices
Preceded by E. Reems	Republican nominee for Governor of Louisiana; 1904	Succeeded by Henry N. Pharr
Political offices
Preceded by Joseph A. Shakspeare	Mayor of New Orleans; November 20, 1882 – April 28, 1884	Succeeded by J. Valsin Guillotte
