= James F. Miller =

American politician

James F. Miller (October 13, 1831 – December 12, 1873) was a United States Army officer who served as the military mayor of New Orleans from February 1, 1863, to February 3, 1864.

Political offices
Preceded by Henry C. Deming	Mayor of New Orleans; January 30, 1863 – September 12, 1863	Succeeded by Edward Henry Durell
Preceded by Edward Henry Durell	Mayor of New Orleans; November 6, 1863 – February 2, 1864	Succeeded by Stephen Hoyt
