= Mayor of New Orleans =

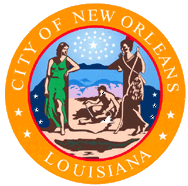
- Seal of City of New Orleans

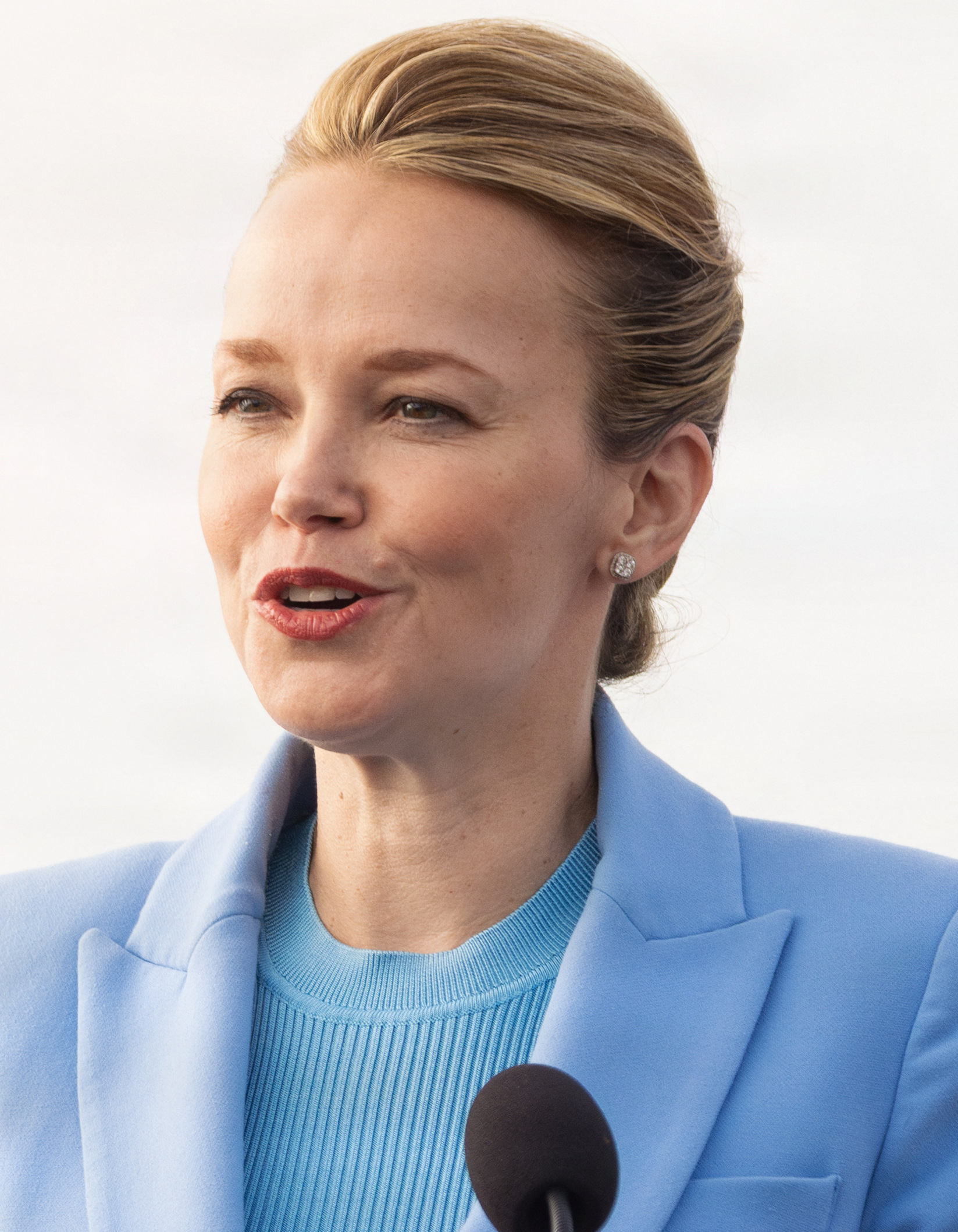
- Incumbent; Helena Moreno since January 12, 2026
- Style: The Honorable
- Term length: 4 years renewable once
- Inaugural holder: Étienne de Boré
- Formation: 1803
- Salary: $140,000
- Website: Mayor's office website

The post of Mayor of the City of New Orleans (French: Maire de La Nouvelle-Orléans) has been held by the following individuals since New Orleans came under American administration following the Louisiana Purchase — the 1803 acquisition by the U.S. of 828,800 square miles (2,147,000 km^{2}) of the French province La Louisiane. In all mayoral elections since 1930, New Orleans has used a two-round system with a preliminary round and a runoff if no candidate reached a majority in the first round. All mayors of New Orleans since 1872 have belonged to the Democratic Party.

== List of mayors ==
No.	Mayor	Took office	Left office	Tenure	Party	Election
1	Étienne de Boré (1741–1820)	December 20, 1803	May 26, 1804 (Note: De Boré resigned to look after his personal affairs.)	158 days	Independent	App. (Note: Appointed by Orleans Territory governor William C. C. Claiborne.)
2	Cavelier Petit (TBA–TBA); Acting	May 26, 1804	June 5, 1804	10 days	Independent	–
3	James Pitot (1761–1831)	June 6, 1804	July 26, 1805	1 year, 50 days	Independent	App.
4	John Watkins (?–1812)	July 27, 1805	March 8, 1807	1 year, 224 days	Independent	App.
5	James Mather (c. 1750–1821)	March 9, 1807	May 23, 1812	5 years, 75 days	Independent	App.
6	Charles Trudeau (1743–1816); Acting	May 24, 1812	October 8, 1812	137 days	Independent	–
7	Nicholas Girod (1751–1840); 1st time	October 8, 1812	November 5, 1812	28 days	Democratic-Republican	TBA
8	François Joseph LeBreton Dorgenois (TBA–TBA); Acting	November 6, 1812	December 4, 1812	28 days	Democratic-Republican	–
(7)	Nicholas Girod (1751–1840); 2nd time	December 5, 1812	September 4, 1815	2 years, 273 days	Democratic-Republican	TBA
9	Augustin de Macarty (1774–1844)	September 4, 1815	May 13, 1820	4 years, 252 days	Democratic-Republican	TBA
10	Louis Philippe de Roffignac (1773–1846)	May 14, 1820	May 10, 1828 (Note: De Roffignac resigned to return to his native France.)	7 years, 362 days	Democratic-Republican	TBA
11	Denis Prieur (c. 1791–1857); 1st time	May 12, 1828	April 9, 1838 (Note: Prieur resigned to become mortgage registrar.)	9 years, 332 days	Jacksonian	TBA
12	Paul Bertus (TBA–TBA); 1st time Acting	April 10, 1838	May 12, 1838	32 days	Independent	–
13	Charles Genois (c. 1793–1866)	May 12, 1838	May 10, 1840	1 year, 364 days	Whig	TBA
14	William Freret (1804–1864); 1st time	May 11, 1840	April 4, 1842	1 year, 328 days	Native American	TBA
(11)	Denis Prieur (c. 1791–1857); 2nd time	April 4, 1842	February 7, 1843 (Note: Prieur resigned for a second time to take a state office.)	309 days	Democratic	TBA
(12)	Paul Bertus (TBA–TBA); 2nd time Acting	February 7, 1843	February 26, 1843	19 days	Independent	–
(14)	William Freret (1804–1864); 2nd time	February 27, 1843	May 12, 1844	1 year, 75 days	Whig	TBA
15	Joseph Edgard Montegut (1806–1880)	May 13, 1844	April 5, 1846	1 year, 327 days	Democratic	TBA
16	Abdiel Crossman (1804–1859)	May 11, 1846	March 26, 1854	7 years, 319 days	Whig	TBA
17	John L. Lewis (1800–1886)	April 10, 1854	June 17, 1856	2 years, 68 days	Democratic	TBA
18	Charles M. Waterman (c. 1809–1860)	June 17, 1856	June 3, 1858 (Note: Waterman was impeached and removed by the New Orleans City Council.)	1 year, 351 days	American	TBA
19	Henry M. Summers (?–1865); Acting	June 5, 1858	June 21, 1858	16 days	American	–
20	Gerald Stith (1821–?)	June 21, 1858	June 18, 1860	1 year, 363 days	American	TBA
21	John T. Monroe (1822–1871); 1st time	June 18, 1860	May 16, 1862 (Note: Monroe was suspended from office and arrested following the Capture of New Orleans.)	1 year, 332 days	Constitutional Union	TBA
Acting military mayors during American Civil War and Reconstruction era
–	George Foster Shepley (1819–1878); Acting	May 20, 1862	July 11, 1862	52 days	Military	
–	Jonas H. French (1829–1903); Acting	August 6, 1862	August 20, 1862	14 days	Military	
–	Godfrey Weitzel (1835–1884); Acting	August 21, 1862	September 30, 1862	40 days	Military	
–	John T. Monroe (1822–1871); 2nd time Acting	October 2, 1862	January 30, 1863	120 days	Military	
–	James F. Miller (1831–1873); Acting	January 30, 1863	February 2, 1864	1 year, 3 days	Military	
–	Stephen Hoyt (TBA–TBA); Acting	February 9, 1864	March 21, 1865	1 year, 40 days	Military	
–	Hugh Kennedy (1810–1888); 1st time Acting	March 21, 1865	May 5, 1865	45 days	Military	
–	Samuel Miller Quincy (1832–1887); Acting	May 5, 1865	June 8, 1865	34 days	Military	
–	Glendy Burke (1805–?); Acting	June 8, 1865	June 28, 1865	20 days	Military	
–	Hugh Kennedy (1810–1888); 2nd time Acting	June 28, 1865	March 18, 1866	263 days	Military	
–	J. A. D. Rozier (?–1896); Acting	March 19, 1866	March 20, 1866	1 day	Military	
–	George Clark (TBA–TBA); Acting	March 20, 1866	May 11, 1866	52 days	Military	
Office resumed following Reconstruction
(21)	John T. Monroe (1822–1871); 3rd time	May 12, 1866	March 27, 1867 (Note: Monroe was deposed by General Philip Sheridan.)	319 days	Democratic	1866
22	Edward Heath (c. 1819–1892)	March 28, 1867	June 10, 1868	1 year, 74 days	Republican	TBA
23	John R. Conway (1825–1896)	June 10, 1868	April 4, 1870	1 year, 298 days	Democratic	1868
24	Benjamin Flanders (1816–1896)	April 4, 1870	November 29, 1872	2 years, 239 days	Republican	App. (Note: Flanders was appointed by Governor Henry Clay Warmoth.)
25	Louis A. Wiltz (1843–1881)	November 30, 1872	November 30, 1874	2 years, 0 days	Democratic	1872
26	Charles J. Leeds (TBA–TBA)	November 30, 1874	December 19, 1876	2 years, 19 days	Democratic	1874
27	Edward Pilsbury (1824–1882)	December 19, 1876	November 18, 1878	1 year, 334 days	Democratic (Ring)	1876
28	Isaac W. Patton (1828–1890)	November 18, 1878	December 16, 1880	2 years, 28 days	Democratic (Ring)	1878
29	Joseph A. Shakspeare (1837–1896); 1st time	December 16, 1880	November 20, 1882	1 year, 339 days	Democratic (Reform)	1880
30	William J. Behan (1840–1928)	November 20, 1882	April 28, 1884	1 year, 160 days	Democratic (Ring)	1882
31	J. Valsin Guillotte (1850–1917)	April 29, 1884	April 23, 1888	3 years, 360 days	Democratic (Ring)	1884
31	J. Valsin Guillotte (1850–1917)	April 29, 1884	April 23, 1888	3 years, 360 days	Democratic (Ring)	1886
(29)	Joseph A. Shakspeare (1837–1896); 2nd time	April 23, 1888	April 25, 1892	4 years, 2 days	Democratic (Reform)	1888
(29)	Joseph A. Shakspeare (1837–1896); 2nd time	April 23, 1888	April 25, 1892	4 years, 2 days	Democratic (Reform)	1890
32	John Fitzpatrick (1844–1919)	April 25, 1892	April 27, 1896	4 years, 2 days	Democratic (Ring)	1892
32	John Fitzpatrick (1844–1919)	April 25, 1892	April 27, 1896	4 years, 2 days	Democratic (Ring)	1894
33	Walter C. Flower (1850–1900)	April 27, 1896	May 7, 1900	4 years, 10 days	Democratic (Reform)	1896
33	Walter C. Flower (1850–1900)	April 27, 1896	May 7, 1900	4 years, 10 days	Democratic (Reform)	1898
34	Paul Capdevielle (1842–1922)	May 7, 1900	December 5, 1904	4 years, 212 days	Democratic (Ring)	1900
34	Paul Capdevielle (1842–1922)	May 7, 1900	December 5, 1904	4 years, 212 days	Democratic (Ring)	1902
35	Martin Behrman (1864–1926); 1st time	December 5, 1904	December 6, 1920	16 years, 1 day	Democratic (Ring)	1904
35	Martin Behrman (1864–1926); 1st time	December 5, 1904	December 6, 1920	16 years, 1 day	Democratic (Ring)	1908
35	Martin Behrman (1864–1926); 1st time	December 5, 1904	December 6, 1920	16 years, 1 day	Democratic (Ring)	1912
35	Martin Behrman (1864–1926); 1st time	December 5, 1904	December 6, 1920	16 years, 1 day	Democratic (Ring)	1916
36	Andrew J. McShane (1865–1936)	December 6, 1920	May 4, 1925	4 years, 149 days	Democratic (Reform)	1920
(35)	Martin Behrman (1864–1926); 2nd time	May 4, 1925	January 12, 1926 (Note: Died in office.)	253 days	Democratic (Ring)	1925
37	Arthur J. O'Keefe (1876–1943)	January 12, 1926	July 15, 1929 (Note: O'Keefe resigned for health reasons.)	3 years, 184 days	Democratic (Ring)	–
38	T. Semmes Walmsley (1889–1942)	July 15, 1929	June 30, 1936 (Note: Walmsley resigned after being stripped of his powers by the Ring-controlled City Council. The powers of the city government had previously been stripped by Louisiana governor Huey Long as part of a feud with Walmsley, and were subsequently re-granted following Walmsley's resignation.)	6 years, 351 days	Democratic (Ring)	–
38	T. Semmes Walmsley (1889–1942)	July 15, 1929	June 30, 1936	6 years, 351 days	Democratic (Ring)	1930
38	T. Semmes Walmsley (1889–1942)	July 15, 1929	June 30, 1936	6 years, 351 days	Democratic (Ring)	1934
39	A. Miles Pratt (1885–1969); Acting	June 30, 1936	July 15, 1936	15 days	Democratic (Ring)	–
40	Fred A. Earhart (1875–1948); Acting	July 15, 1936		0 days	Democratic (Ring)	–
41	Jesse S. Cave (1872–1948); Acting	July 15, 1936	August 17, 1936	33 days	Democratic (Ring)	–
42	Robert Maestri (1889–1974)	August 18, 1936	April 4, 1946	9 years, 229 days	Democratic (Longite-Ring)	1936
42	Robert Maestri (1889–1974)	August 18, 1936	April 4, 1946	9 years, 229 days	Democratic (Longite-Ring)	1938
42	Robert Maestri (1889–1974)	August 18, 1936	April 4, 1946	9 years, 229 days	Democratic (Longite-Ring)	1942
43	deLesseps Story Morrison (1912–1964)	April 4, 1946	July 17, 1961 (Note: Morrison resigned when he was appointed Ambassador to the Organization of American States by President John F. Kennedy.)	15 years, 104 days	Democratic (Reform)	1946
43	deLesseps Story Morrison (1912–1964)	April 4, 1946	July 17, 1961	15 years, 104 days	Democratic (Reform)	1950
43	deLesseps Story Morrison (1912–1964)	April 4, 1946	July 17, 1961	15 years, 104 days	Democratic (Reform)	1954
43	deLesseps Story Morrison (1912–1964)	April 4, 1946	July 17, 1961	15 years, 104 days	Democratic (Reform)	1958
44	Victor H. Schiro (1904–1992)	July 17, 1961	May 2, 1970	8 years, 289 days	Democratic	–
44	Victor H. Schiro (1904–1992)	July 17, 1961	May 2, 1970	8 years, 289 days	Democratic	1962
44	Victor H. Schiro (1904–1992)	July 17, 1961	May 2, 1970	8 years, 289 days	Democratic	1965
45	Moon Landrieu (1930–2022)	May 2, 1970	May 1, 1978	7 years, 364 days	Democratic	1969–70
45	Moon Landrieu (1930–2022)	May 2, 1970	May 1, 1978	7 years, 364 days	Democratic	1973
46	Ernest Nathan Morial (1929–1989)	May 1, 1978	May 5, 1986	8 years, 4 days	Democratic	1977
46	Ernest Nathan Morial (1929–1989)	May 1, 1978	May 5, 1986	8 years, 4 days	Democratic	1982
47	Sidney Barthelemy (born 1942)	May 5, 1986	May 2, 1994	7 years, 362 days	Democratic	1986
47	Sidney Barthelemy (born 1942)	May 5, 1986	May 2, 1994	7 years, 362 days	Democratic	1990
48	Marc Morial (born 1958)	May 2, 1994	May 6, 2002	8 years, 4 days	Democratic	1994
48	Marc Morial (born 1958)	May 2, 1994	May 6, 2002	8 years, 4 days	Democratic	1998
49	Ray Nagin (born 1956)	May 6, 2002	May 3, 2010	7 years, 362 days	Democratic	2002
49	Ray Nagin (born 1956)	May 6, 2002	May 3, 2010	7 years, 362 days	Democratic	2006
50	Mitch Landrieu (born 1960)	May 3, 2010	May 7, 2018	8 years, 4 days	Democratic	2010
50	Mitch Landrieu (born 1960)	May 3, 2010	May 7, 2018	8 years, 4 days	Democratic	2014
51	LaToya Cantrell (born 1972)	May 7, 2018	January 12, 2026	7 years, 250 days	Democratic	2017
51	LaToya Cantrell (born 1972)	May 7, 2018	January 12, 2026	7 years, 250 days	Democratic	2021
52	Helena Moreno (born 1977)	January 12, 2026	Incumbent	238 days	Democratic	2025

== See also ==
- New Orleans City Council
- New Orleans mayoral elections
- Timeline of New Orleans
