= 1891 New Orleans lynchings =

Murder of eleven Italian men by a mob

Coordinates: 29°57′47″N 90°4′14″W

- Part of Lynching of Italian Americans
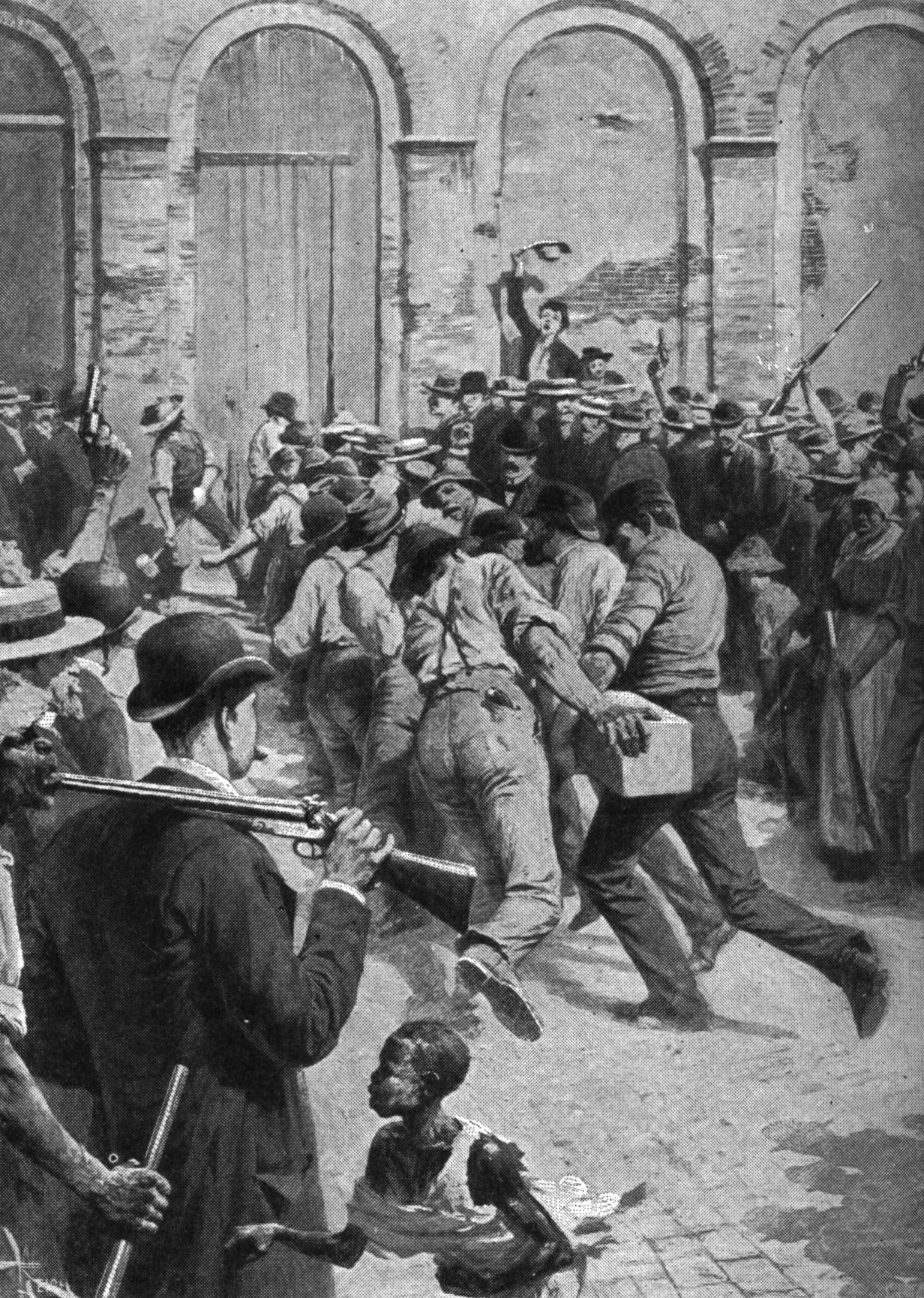
- Rioters breaking into parish prison, as illustrated in History of the United States (1912, Scribner)
- Location: New Orleans, Louisiana
- Date: March 14, 1891
- Target: Italian American suspects of the murder of David Hennessy
- Attack type: Mass lynching, mass murder
- Deaths: 11
- Perpetrators: Leaders: William Parkerson, Walter Denegre, James D. Houston, and John C. Wickliffe; participants included John M. Parker and Walter C. Flower
- Motive: Italophobia, anti-Catholicism, xenophobia

The 1891 New Orleans lynchings were the murders of 11 Italian Americans, immigrants in New Orleans, by a mob for their alleged role in the murder of police chief David Hennessy after some of them had been acquitted at trial. It was the largest single mass lynching in American history. (Note: Gambino notes lynching as distinct from a massacre, and that it was the largest "as measured by the number of people illegally killed in one place at one time, the victims' identities predetermined for some specific alleged offense." This classification would not include massacres, such as the Chinese massacre of 1871, in which victims are chosen "without regard to their individual identities and in which no specific offense on their part is alleged." See also Porvenir massacre. However, others (e.g. those referenced below) do not restrict the definition of "lynching" to exclude those described by other labels like "massacre" or "terrorism".) Most of the lynching victims accused in the murder had been rounded up and charged due to their Italian ethnicity.

The lynching took place on March 14, the day after the trial of nine of the nineteen men indicted in Hennessy's murder. Six of these defendants were acquitted, and a mistrial was declared for the remaining three because the jury failed to agree on their verdicts.

There was a widespread belief in the city that Italian American organized crime was responsible for the killing of the police chief in a period of anti-Italian sentiment and rising crime. Italian American voters were also known to prefer the scandal-plagued city political machine to the new Reform Democrat mayor, whose own role in inciting the violence that followed may well have been an attempt to misuse government power for the repression of his political opponents.

Believing the jury had been fixed by organized crime, a mob broke into the jail where the men were being held and killed eleven of the prisoners, most by shooting. The mob outside the jail numbered in the thousands and included some of the city's most prominent citizens.

The incident had serious national repercussions. The Italian consul Pasquale Corte in New Orleans registered a protest and left the city in May 1891 at his government's direction. The New York Times published a lengthy statement charging city politicians with responsibility for the lynching of the Italians. Italy cut off diplomatic relations with the United States, sparking rumors of war. Increased anti-Italian sentiment led to calls for restrictions on immigration. The word "Mafia" entered the American lexicon, and this incident increased awareness of the Italian mafioso, establishing it in the popular imagination of Americans.

The lynchings were the subject of the 1999 HBO film Vendetta, starring Christopher Walken. The film is based on a 1977 history book of the same name by Richard Gambino.

== Background ==
=== Anti-Italian sentiment in New Orleans ===
In late 19th-century America, there was a growing number of Italians who had been brought in by the business community to replace black labor. Sugar planters, in particular, sought workers who were more efficient than formerly enslaved people; they hired immigrant recruiters to bring Italians to southern Louisiana. In the 1890s, thousands of Italians were arriving in New Orleans each year. Many settled in the French Quarter, which by the early 20th century had a section known as "Little Sicily." Furthermore, during the whole of the 19th century and well into the 20th, Italian immigrants to the United States were often referred to as "White niggers".

In a letter responding to an inquiry about immigration in New Orleans, Mayor Joseph A. Shakspeare expressed the common anti-Italian prejudice, complaining that the city had become attractive to "the worst classes of Europe: Southern Italians and Sicilians...the most idle, vicious, and worthless people among us." He claimed they were "filthy in their persons and homes" and blamed them for the spread of disease, concluding that they were "without courage, honor, truth, pride, religion, or any quality that goes to make a good citizen."

According to professor of history Humbert Nelli, Mayor Shakspeare had been elected as a Reform Democrat with the backing of the Louisiana Republican Party, which had grown increasingly powerless following the end of the Reconstruction era. Mayor Shakspeare and the Republicans were united in opposition to the city's corrupt and scandal-plagued political machine, which was called the Regular Democratic Organization, and remained firmly supported by the city's Italian-American voters. According to Nelli, this may well have been the real reason for the mayor's outspoken anti-Italianism.

=== Assassination of David Hennessy ===
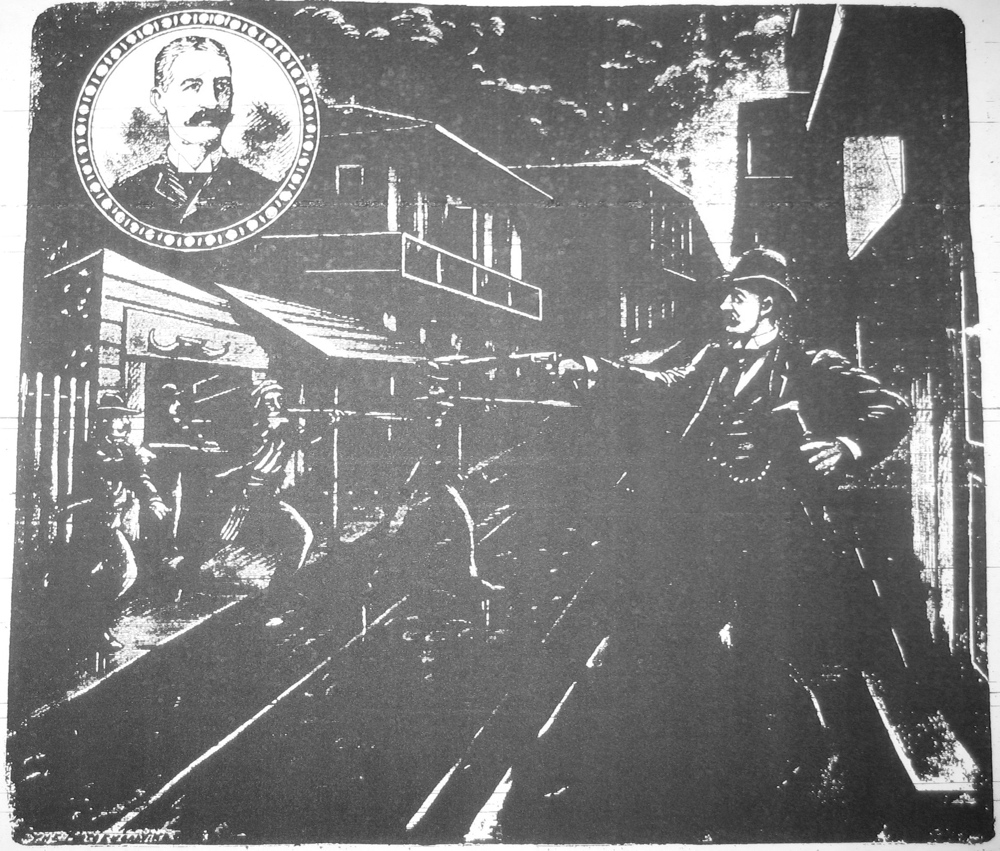
Artist's conception of Hennessy's murder. "Scene of the Assassination", The Mascot, New Orleans, 1890.

On the evening of October 15, 1890, New Orleans police chief David Hennessy was shot by several gunmen as he walked home from work. Hennessy returned fire and chased his attackers before collapsing. When asked who had shot him, Hennessy reportedly whispered to Captain William O'Connor, "dagos" (a derogatory term for Italians and others of Mediterranean heritage). Hennessy was awake in the hospital for several hours after the shooting and spoke to friends but did not name the shooters. The next day complications set in, and he died.

There had been an ongoing feud between the Provenzano and Matranga families, who were business rivals on the New Orleans waterfront. Hennessy had put several of the Provenzanos in prison, and their appeal trial was coming up. According to some reports, Hennessy had been planning to offer new evidence at the trial that would clear the Provenzanos and implicate the Matrangas. If true, this would mean that the Matrangas, and not the Provenzanos, had a motive for the murder. A policeman who was a friend of Hennessy's later testified that Hennessy had told him he had no such plans. In any case, it was widely believed that Hennessy's killers were Italian. Local papers such as the Times-Democrat and the Daily Picayune freely blamed "Dagoes" for the murder.

=== Investigation ===
The murder was quickly followed by mass arrests of local Italians. Mayor Joseph A. Shakspeare (according to the Picayune) told the police to "scour the whole neighborhood. Arrest every Italian you come across." Within 24 hours, 45 people had been arrested. By some accounts, as many as 250 Italians were rounded up. Most were eventually released for lack of evidence. Local Italians were afraid to leave their homes for several days after the murder, but eventually the furor died down and they returned to work.

Nineteen men were ultimately charged with the murder or as accessories and held without bail in the parish prison. These included Charles Matranga, who was charged with plotting the murder, and several of the Matrangas' friends and workers. Pietro Monasterio, a shoemaker, was arrested because he lived across the street from where Hennessy was standing when he was shot. (The assassins had allegedly laid in Monasterio's shop awaiting to attack Chief Hennessey on his way home.) Antonio Marchesi, a fruit peddler, was arrested because he was a friend of Monasterio's and "was known to frequent his shoe shop." Emmanuele Polizzi was arrested when a policeman identified him as one of the men he had seen running from the scene of the crime.

A few days after Hennessy's death, Mayor Shakspeare gave a speech declaring that Hennessy had been "the victim of Sicilian vengeance" and calling upon the citizenry to "teach these people a lesson they will not forget." He appointed a Committee of Fifty to investigate "the existence of secret societies or bands of oath-bound assassins...and to devise necessary means and the most effectual and speedy measures for the uprooting and total annihilation" of any such organizations. On October 23, the committee published an open letter to the Italian community encouraging them to expose the criminals amongst them anonymously.

The letter ended on a menacing note:

We hope this appeal will be met by you in the same spirit in which we issue it, and that this community will not be driven to harsh and stringent methods outside of the law, which may involve the innocent and guilty alike...Upon you and your willingness to give information depends which of these courses shall be pursued.

The letter was signed by the committee's chairman, Edgar H. Farrar, who later served as president of the American Bar Association. Other prominent members of the Committee included General Algernon S. Badger, Judge Robert C. Davey, politician Walter C. Flower, Colonel James Lewis, and architect Thomas Sully.

The Committee of Fifty hired two private detectives to pose as prisoners and try to get the defendants to talk about the murder. Apparently the detectives did not obtain any useful information, because they were not asked to testify at the trial. Only Polizzi, who appeared to be mentally ill, said anything to incriminate himself, and his confession was deemed inadmissible.

Meanwhile, the defendants were subject to extremely negative pretrial publicity. Across the country, newspapers ran headlines such as "Vast Mafia in New Orleans" and "1,100 Dago Criminals."

Several shotguns were found near the scene of the crime. One was a muzzle-loading shotgun of a type which was widely used throughout the American South but which the New Orleans Police Department claimed was a lupara, a "favorite" weapon of the Sicilian Mafia. Another shotgun found at the scene had a hinged stock. Local newspapers alleged that the guns were imported from Sicily; in reality, they had been manufactured by the W. Richards Company.

Spurred to action by the popular accounts of Hennessy's murder, a 29-year-old newspaper salesman named Thomas Duffy walked into the prison on October 17, 1890, sought out Antonio Scaffidi, whom he had heard was a suspect, and shot him in the neck with a revolver. Scaffidi survived the attack, only to be lynched a few months later. Duffy was eventually convicted of assault and sentenced to six months in prison.

=== Murder trial ===
A trial for nine of the suspects began on February 16, 1891, and concluded on March 13, 1891, with Judge Joshua G. Baker presiding. The defendants were represented by Lionel Adams of the law firm Adams and O'Malley, and the state was represented by Orleans Parish district attorney Charles A. Luzenberg. Jury selection was a time-consuming process: Hundreds of prospective jurors were rejected before 12 people were found who were not opposed to capital punishment, were not openly prejudiced against Italians, and were not of Italian descent themselves.

Much of the evidence presented at trial was weak or contradictory. The murder had taken place on a poorly lit street on a damp night in a notoriously corrupt city and the eyewitness testimony was unreliable. Suspects were identified by witnesses who had not seen their faces but only their clothing. Captain Bill O'Connor, the witness who claimed to have heard Hennessy blame "Dagoes" for the assassination, was not called to testify.

There were numerous other discrepancies and improprieties. At one point, two employees of the defense law firm were arrested for attempting to bribe prospective jurors. Afterward, when federal district attorney William Grant looked into the case, he reported that the evidence against the men was "exceedingly unsatisfactory" and inconclusive. He could find no evidence linking any of the lynched men to the Mafia or to any attempts to bribe the jury. The bribery charges were eventually dismissed.

Matranga and another man, Bastian Incardona, were found not guilty by directed verdict, as no evidence had been presented against them. The jury declared four of the defendants not guilty, and asked the judge to declare a mistrial for the other three, as they could not agree on a verdict. The six who were acquitted were not released but were held pending an additional charge of "lying in wait" with intent to commit murder. Luzenberg admitted that without a murder conviction, he would be forced to drop the "lying in wait" charges. But all nineteen men were returned to the prison—a decision which would prove fatal for some of them.

The jurors were given the option to leave by a side door but chose to walk out the front door and face the angry crowd. Several defended their decision to reporters, arguing that they had "reasonable doubt" and had done what they thought was right. Some were harassed, threatened, fired from their jobs, and otherwise penalized for failing to convict the Italians.

=== Incitement ===
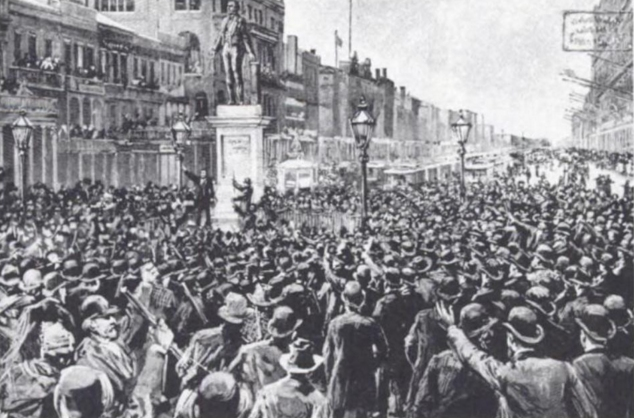
William S. Parkerson inciting the mob. Harper's Weekly, March 28, 1891.

A group of about 150 people calling themselves the Committee on Safety (referring to the Revolutionary War era) met that evening to plan their response. The following morning, an ad appeared in local newspapers calling for a mass meeting at the statue of Henry Clay near the prison. Citizens were told to "come prepared for action."

The Daily States editorialized:

Rise, people of New Orleans! Alien hands of oath-bound assassins have set the blot of a martyr's blood upon your vaunted civilization! Your laws, in the very Temple of Justice, have been bought off, and suborners have caused to be turned loose upon your streets the midnight murderers of David C. Hennessy, in whose premature grave the very majesty of our American law lies buried with his mangled corpse—the corpse of him who in life was the representative, the conservator of your peace and dignity.

As thousands of demonstrators gathered near the Parish Prison, Pasquale Corte, the Italian consul in New Orleans sought the help of Louisiana governor Francis T. Nicholls to prevent an outbreak of violence. The governor declined to take any action without a request from Mayor Shakspeare, who had gone out to breakfast and could not be reached. Meanwhile, at the Clay statue, attorney William S. Parkerson was exhorting the people of New Orleans to "set aside the verdict of that infamous jury, every one of whom is a perjurer and a scoundrel." When the speech was over, the multi-racial crowd marched to the prison, chanting, "We want the Dagoes."

== Lynching ==
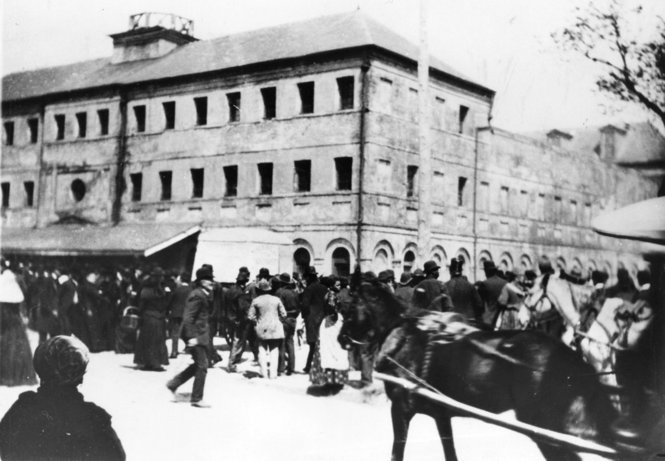
Rioters outside Parish Prison

Lynchings were not uncommon in the United States and the Tuskegee Institute recorded the lynchings of 3,446 blacks and 1,297 whites between 1882 and 1968, with the peak occurring in the 1890s. Inside the prison, as the mob was breaking down the door with a battering ram, prison warden Lemuel Davis let the 19 Italian prisoners out of their cells and told them to hide as best they could.

Although the thousands of demonstrators outside for the lynching were a spontaneous outburst, the killings were carried out by a relatively small, disciplined "execution squad" within the mob led by Parkerson and three other city leaders: Walter Denegre, lawyer; James D. Houston, politician and businessman; and John C. Wickliffe, editor of the New Delta newspaper. Other members of the lynch mob included John M. Parker, who was elected as Louisiana's 37th governor, and Walter C. Flower, who was elected as the 44th mayor of New Orleans.

The mentally ill Polizzi was hauled outside, hanged from a lamppost, and shot. Antonio Bagnetto, a fruit peddler, was hanged from a tree and shot. Nine others were shot or clubbed to death inside the prison. The bullet-riddled bodies of Polizzi and Bagnetto were left hanging for hours.

=== Victims ===
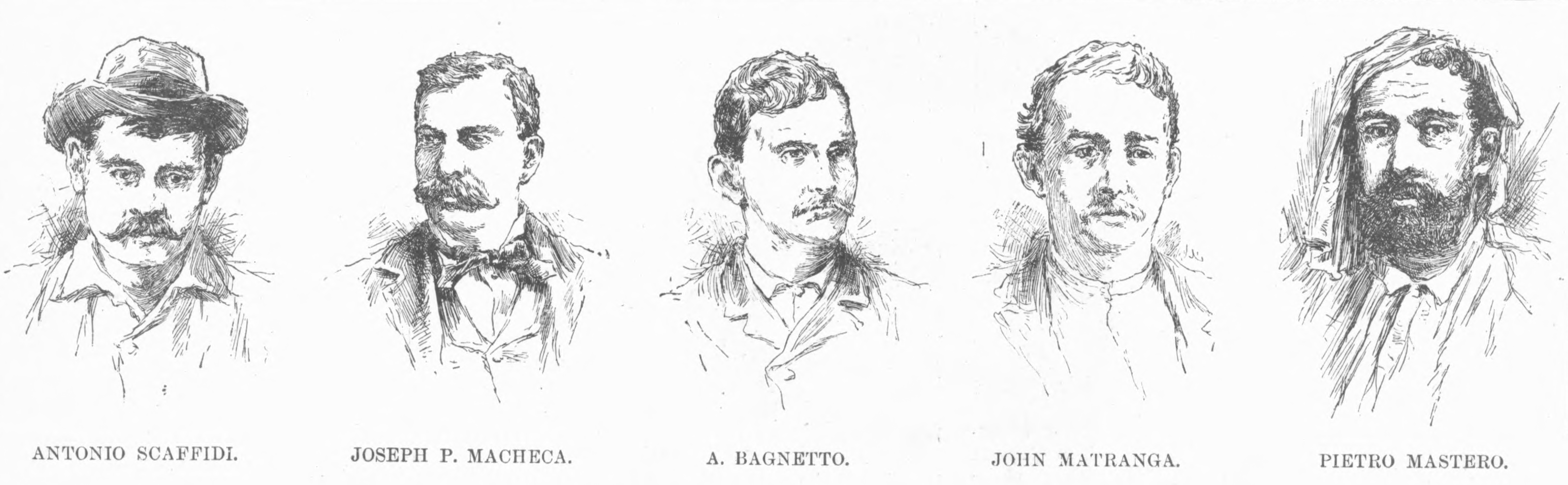

The following people were lynched:

- Antonio Bagnetto, fruit peddler: tried and acquitted.
- James Caruso, stevedore: not tried.
- Loreto Comitis, tinsmith: not tried.
- Rocco Geraci, stevedore: not tried.
- Joseph Macheca, American-born former blockade runner, fruit importer, and political boss of the New Orleans Italian American community for the Regular Democratic Organization: tried and acquitted.
- Antonio Marchesi, fruit peddler: tried and acquitted.
- Pietro Monasterio, cobbler: mistrial declared.
- Emmanuele Polizzi, street vendor: mistrial declared.
- Frank Romero, ward heeler for the Regular Democratic Organization: not tried.
- Antonio Scaffidi, fruit peddler: mistrial declared.
- Charles Traina, rice plantation laborer: not tried.

The following people managed to escape lynching by hiding inside the prison:

- John Caruso, stevedore: not tried.
- Bastian Incardona, laborer: tried and acquitted.
- Gaspare Marchesi, 14, son of Antonio Marchesi: tried and acquitted.
- Charles Matranga, labor manager: tried and acquitted.
- Peter Natali, laborer: not tried.
- Charles Pietza (or Pietzo), grocer: not tried.
- Charles Patorno, merchant: not tried.
- Salvatore Sinceri, stevedore: not tried.

The court and district attorney set the survivors free after the lynching and dropped the charges against the men who had not yet been tried.

Only one of the lynching victims, Polizzi, had a police record in the US, having reportedly cut a man with a knife in Austin, Texas, several years earlier. Two others had police records in Italy: Geraci had been accused of murder and had fled before he could be tried, and Comitis had been convicted of theft. Incardona was wanted in Italy as a petty criminal.

Three of the men—Comitis, Monasterio, and Traina—had not applied for US citizenship and could still be considered Italian subjects.

All of those lynched were Sicilian immigrants except for Macheca, a Louisiana native of Sicilian descent, and Comitis, who was from Abruzzi. Shortly after Hennessy's death, the Daily States informed readers that the suspects were "a villainous looking set" and described their appearance in ethnic terms, concluding, "They are not Italians, but Sicilians."

Most anti-Italianism in the United States was directed at Southern Italians, particularly Sicilians, who were often considered to be more racially suspect. The US Bureau of Immigration reinforced this distinction, following the Italian practice of classifying Northern and Southern Italians as two different races. However, even though on a legal level both Northern and Southern Italians were considered to be white, between 1890 and 1910, Sicilian-Americans made up less than 4 percent of the white male population, yet were roughly 40 percent of the white victims of Southern lynch mobs. Before that, many white victims were Irish Catholics. Sicilians in the South often had menial positions, working on construction of levees and railroads and as farm workers.

Macheca's personal history, however, is more complex. He was born in 1843 to a Sicilian father and Maltese mother in Louisiana and adopted and raised by his mother's second husband, a Maltese man named Macheca (originally Mercieca). During the American Civil War, he served in the Confederate States Army. In 1868, either Macheca led a group of Sicilians in a violent, anti-black demonstration. Although not a member of the White League, as a Captain of the 1st Louisiana Infantry Regiment, Macheca fought in the Battle of Liberty Place on the same side as the Crescent City White League in 1874.

Macheca was also the leader of a crew of Sicilian immigrants called "The Innocents". Depending on the source, "The Innocents" were either a White Supremacist street gang employed by the Regular Democratic Organization to commit voter intimidation and murder, the beginning of the New Orleans crime family, or security guards hired to protect Macheca and his various businesses. The racial politics are further complicated by the involvement in the 1891 riot of a large number of African-American lynchers. For example, Colonel James Lewis, a member of the elite Committee of Fifty, was a mixed-race African-American man who had been an officer in the Louisiana Native Guard and leader of the New Orleans Republican Party. In fact, Lewis was one of the signatories of a letter to the Italian community, urging people to inform the Committee of Fifty about the suspects and threatening extrajudicial action.

== Aftermath ==
=== Press coverage ===
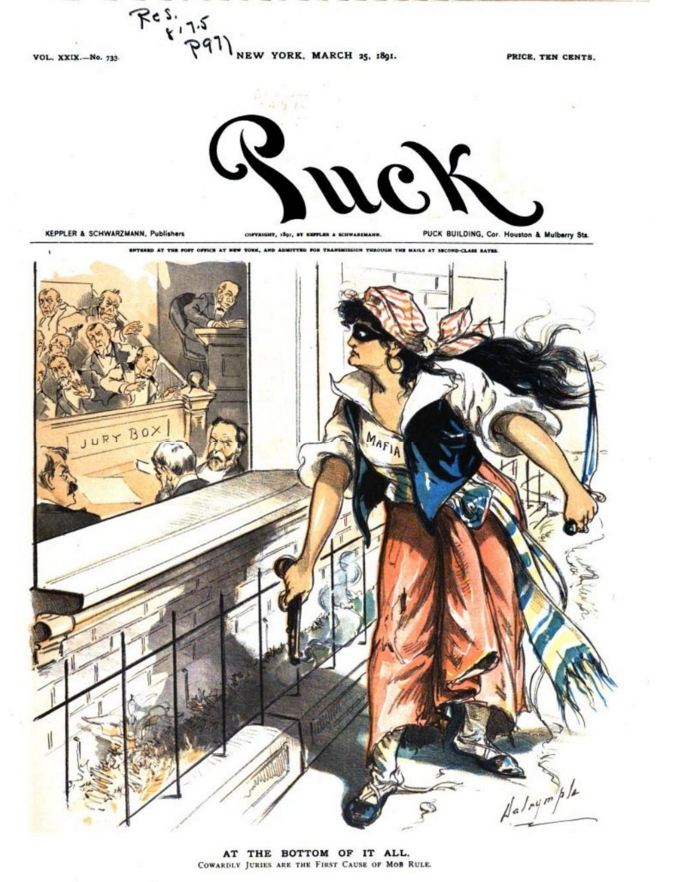
Cartoon that appeared in Puck on March 25, 1891

American newspaper accounts at the time were largely sympathetic to the lynchers and anti-Italian in tone. The victims were presumed to have been involved with the Mafia, a criminal organization that dealt in theft, terror and murder, and therefore deserving of their fate. A New York Times headline announced, "Chief Hennessy Avenged...Italian Murderers Shot Down." A Times editorial the next day vilified Sicilians in general:

These sneaking and cowardly Sicilians, the descendants of bandits and assassins, who have transported to this country the lawless passions, the cut-throat practices, and the oath-bound societies of their native country, are to us a pest without mitigation. Our own rattlesnakes are as good citizens as they...Lynch law was the only course open to the people of New Orleans.

Many commentators offered a pro forma condemnation of vigilantism before ultimately blaming the victims and defending the lynchers. Massachusetts representative Henry Cabot Lodge, for example, claimed to deplore the mob's behavior and then proceeded to justify it while proposing new restrictions on Italian immigration. Even the London Times expressed approval.

Not all editors were convinced of the mob's innocence. The Charleston News and Courier argued that murder by vigilantes was no more acceptable than any other kind. The St. Louis Republic wrote that the men were killed "on proof of being 'dagoes' and on the merest suspicion of being guilty of any other crime." Some Northern newspapers also condemned the lynchings. Many others, however, implicitly or explicitly condoned them. A Boston Globe front-page headline read, "STILETTO RULE: New Orleans Arose to Meet the Curse." Boston was another industrial city that had been receiving many immigrants from Southern Italy.

Following strong protests by the Italian government and the Italian-American community, the press eventually became less supportive of the lynchers.

=== Criminal charges ===
A grand jury convened on March 17, 1891, to investigate the lynching. Judge Robert H. Marr, who presided over the jury, was a longtime personal friend of several of the lynch mob participants. On May 5, 1891, the grand jury published a report concluding that several jurors in the Hennessy case had been bribed to acquit the Italians. Yet, no proof was offered and no criminal charges were pursued.

The grand jury claimed that it could not identify the participants in the lynching. In the same report, the lynching was described as a "gathering" of "several thousands of the first, best, and even the most law-abiding, of the citizens of this city." No one was indicted. Only Thomas Duffy, the newspaper salesman who had shot Scaffidi in October, was penalized. Duffy was serving time in the parish prison at the time of the lynching.

After the Hennessy case, at least eight more men of Italian descent were lynched in Louisiana during the 1890s. In each case, as was typical of lynchings, local authorities claimed to be unable to identify anyone involved and never prosecuted anyone for the murders.

=== Political repercussions ===
The incident strained relations between the United States and Italy. The Italian consul Pasquale Corte left New Orleans in late May 1891 and the New York Times published his statement accusing the city politicians of responsibility for the lynchings. The Italian government demanded that the lynch mob be brought to justice and that reparations be paid to the dead men's families. When the US declined to prosecute the mob leaders, Italy recalled its ambassador from Washington in protest. The US followed suit, recalling its legation from Rome. Diplomatic relations remained at an impasse for over a year, and there were rumors of a declaration of war on America as a result of the murders. As part of a wider effort to ease tensions with Italy and placate Italian Americans, President Benjamin Harrison declared the first nationwide celebration of Columbus Day in 1892, commemorating the 400th anniversary of the Italian explorer's landing in the New World.

When President Harrison agreed to pay a $25,000 indemnity to the victims' families, Congress tried unsuccessfully to intervene against the reparations, accusing him of "unconstitutional executive usurpation of Congressional powers." The United States paid $2,211.90 to each family of the eleven victims.

The contrasting American and Italian attitudes toward the lynchings are perhaps best summarized by Theodore Roosevelt's comment. Roosevelt, then serving on the United States Civil Service Commission, wrote to his sister Anna Roosevelt Cowles on March 21, 1891:

Monday we dined at the Camerons; various dago diplomats were present, all much wrought up by the lynching of the Italians in New Orleans. Personally I think it rather a good thing, and said so.

The incident has been mostly forgotten in the US, relegated to the footnotes of American history texts. However, it is more widely known in Italy.

Mayor Shakspeare was narrowly defeated for reelection in 1892 by Regular Democratic Organization candidate John Fitzpatrick. The Italian-American vote, which remained even more firmly on the political machine's side for decades after the lynchings, was a decisive factor in Mayor Shakspeare's defeat. Gaspare Marchesi, the boy who survived by hiding in the prison while his father was lynched, was awarded $5,000 in damages in 1893 after successfully suing the city of New Orleans.

The death of Hennessy became a rallying cry for law enforcement and nativists to halt the immigration of Italians into America. In an influential essay, Henry Cabot Lodge pointed out that "the paupers and criminals of Europe" were "pouring into the United States" and proposed a literacy test to weed out the least desirable immigrants.

The Hennessy case introduced the word "Mafia" to the American public. It first made widely known the now-familiar image of the Italian-American mafioso. Journalists of the time used the word "Mafia" loosely to sell newspapers, often linking the crimes of individual Italians to organized crime when no evidence of such a connection existed for that particular crime. After the lynching, newspapers circulated wild rumors that thousands of Italian Americans were plotting to attack New Orleans and were wrecking railroads in New York and Chicago. The press reported that the defense lawyers in the Hennessy case were paid by the Mafia when Italian-language newspapers in cities across the country had raised funds for the men's legal defense. Soon historians were applying the "Mafia" label retroactively to crimes committed by Italians in the past.

For decades after the lynching, New Orleans children of other ethnicities would taunt Italian Americans with the phrase, "Who killa da chief?"

=== Books and films ===
For the better part of a century, most historians relied on contemporary newspaper accounts as their primary sources of information about the lynching, seldom questioning the guilt of the lynched men or the popular assumption that Hennessy's murder was a contract killing by the New Orleans crime family. In the 1970s, two studies by Italian American historians challenged the prevailing view.

Humbert Nelli, a professor of history at the University of Kentucky, examined the Hennessy case in a chapter of The Business of Crime (1976). Nelli demonstrated that the evidence against the defendants was weak and argued that the murder was too poorly planned and amateurish to have been a Mafia hit. In a chapter on crime in New Orleans, he claims that although crime flourished among the city's Southern Italians at the time, it could not accurately be attributed to mafiosi.

In Vendetta: The True Story of the Largest Lynching in U.S. History (1977), (Note: The original title was Vendetta: A True Story of the Worst Lynching in America, the Mass Murder of Italian-Americans in New Orleans in 1891, the Vicious Motivations Behind It, and the Tragic Repercussions that Linger to This Day.) Richard Gambino, a professor at City University of New York, raised numerous questions about the investigation and trial and proposes an alternative theory about Hennessy's murder. Among other things, Gambino notes that Hennessy had a "colorful" past that provided any number of possible motives to be subject to murder, none of which the police chose to investigate. He also notes that shortly after the lynching, the city passed an ordinance giving control of all New Orleans dock work to the newly formed Louisiana Construction and Improvement Corporation, a business headed by several of the lynch mob leaders. Italian waterfront merchants and workers, who had been making remarkable economic progress up to then, were thus eliminated as competitors.

The 1999 HBO movie Vendetta, starring Christopher Walken and directed by Nicholas Meyer, is based on Gambino's book. It portrays Macheca and several of the other lynched men as innocent victims. It is narrated by the character of Gaspare Marchesi, the boy who escaped being lynched by hiding in the prison.

Reviewers have criticized Gambino's language as sensational and partisan while acknowledging the book's merits. Writing in the Journal of American History in 1977, Raymond Nussbaum (an alumnus of Tulane University) suggested that historians looking for a balanced account of the lynching look elsewhere. In a film review that appeared in the same journal in 2000, Clive Webb calls the movie a "compelling portrait of prejudice" and recommends that historians consult the book for more information.

The lynching is discussed in the 2004 documentary, Linciati: Lynchings of Italians in America, directed by M. Heather Hartley. Lynchings of Italians are also mentioned in various documentaries on the Italian-American experience.

The story of the lynching is covered in episode 120 of the History on Fire podcast by Daniele Bolelli.

== See also ==
- Italians in New Orleans
- Anti-Italianism in the United States
- Italian Americans: Discrimination and stereotyping
- Lynching in the United States
- Lynching of Italian Americans
- Italy–United States relations
- Sacco and Vanzetti

== Sources ==
=== Books ===
- Gambino, Richard (2000). Vendetta: The True Story of the Largest Lynching in U.S. History (2nd ed.). Toronto: Guernica. ISBN 1-55071-103-2. OCLC 43282789.
- Margavio, A.; Salomone, Jerome (2014). Bread and Respect: The Italians of Louisiana. Chicago: Pelican Publishing. ISBN 978-1-4556-0150-9. OCLC 1257076872.
- Nelli, Humbert S. (1981). The Business of Crime: Italians and Syndicate Crime in the United States. University of Chicago Press. p. 29. ISBN 9780226571324. pp 24–69
- Puleo, Stephen (2007). The Boston Italians: A Story of Pride, Perseverance, and Paesani, from the Years of the Great Immigration to the Present Day. Boston: Beacon Press. ISBN 978-0-8070-5036-1. OCLC 71812706.
- Smith, Tom (2007). The Crescent City Lynchings: The Murder of Chief Hennessy, the New Orleans "Mafia" Trials, and the Parish Prison Mob. Guilford, CT. ISBN 978-1-59228-901-1. OCLC 77536401.
- Cummins, Light Townsend (2014). Louisiana: A History. Judith Kelleher Schafer, Edward F. Haas, Michael L. Kurtz, Bennett H. Wall, John C. Rodrigue (Sixth ed.). Chichester, West Sussex. ISBN 978-1-118-61964-3. OCLC 855507249.

=== Articles ===
- Baiamonte, John V. (1992). "'Who Killa de Chief' Revisited: The Hennessey Assassination and Its Aftermath, 1890–1991". Louisiana History. 33 (2). Louisiana Historical Association: 117–146. JSTOR 4232935.
- Botein, Barbara (1979). "The Hennessy Case: An Episode in Anti-Italian Nativism". Louisiana History. 20 (3). Louisiana Historical Association: 261–279. JSTOR 4231912.
- Botein, Barbara (1978). "Review". Louisiana History. 19 (4). Louisiana Historical Association: 505–506. JSTOR 4231852.
- DeLucia, Christine (2003). "Getting the Story Straight: Press Coverage of Italian-American Lynchings from 1856–1910". Italian Americana. 21 (2): 212–221. JSTOR 29776894.
- Donohue, Stacy Lee (September 17, 2012). "Review of Linciati: Lynchings of Italians in America (2004)". Film & History. Archived from the original on November 11, 2016.
- Jackson, Joy (1977). "Review". The Journal of Southern History. 43 (4). Southern Historical Association: 628–629. doi:10.2307/2207032. JSTOR 2207032.
- Kurtz, Michael L. (1983). "Organized Crime in Louisiana History: Myth and Reality". Louisiana History. 24 (4). Louisiana Historical Association: 355–376. JSTOR 4232305.
- Leach, Eugene E. (1992). "Mental Epidemics: Crowd Psychology and American Culture, 1890–1940". American Studies. 33 (1). Mid-America American Studies Association: 5–29. JSTOR 40644255.
- Liles, Stinson (May 9, 2017). "Rhetoric Becomes Gruesome Reality on a Sunny Saturday Morning in 19th-Century New Orleans". Southern Hollows: A Podcast of Erstwhile Unpleasantness.
- Lodge, Henry Cabot (May 1891). "Lynch Law and Unrestricted Immigration". The North American Review. 152 (414). University of Northern Iowa: 602–612. JSTOR 25102181.
- Nussbaum, Raymond O. (1977). "Review". The Journal of American History. 64 (3). Oxford University Press: 809–810. doi:10.2307/1887297. JSTOR 1887297.
- Roosevelt, Theodore (March 21, 1891). "Letter from Theodore Roosevelt to Anna Roosevelt". Theodore Roosevelt Collection.
- Wasserman, Ira M. (1998). "Media Rhetoric and Images of Lynching in the Nineteenth and Twentieth Centuries". Michigan Sociological Review. 12. Michigan Sociological Association: 68–94. JSTOR 40969023.
- Webb, Clive (2000). "Review". The Journal of American History. 87 (3). Oxford University Press: 1155–1156. doi:10.2307/2675451. JSTOR 2675451.
- Wiley, Bell I.; Pozzetta, George E. (1978). "Review". The Florida Historical Quarterly. 56 (3). Florida Historical Society: 378–379. JSTOR 30147455.
- "Under Attack | Italian | Immigration and Relocation in U.S. History | Classroom Materials at the Library of Congress | Library of Congress". Library of Congress.
- "Chief Hennessy Avenged; Eleven of His Italian Assassins Lynched by a Mob. An Uprising of Indignant Citizens in New Orleans – The Prison Doors Forced and the Italian Murderers Shot Down". The New York Times. March 15, 1891.
- "The New Orleans Affair" (PDF). The New York Times. March 16, 1891. p. 4.
- "STILETTO RULE: New Orleans Arose to Meet the Curse". The Boston Globe. March 16, 1891. p. 1. ProQuest 494193267.
