= Robert Hardin Marr =

American judge (1819–1892)

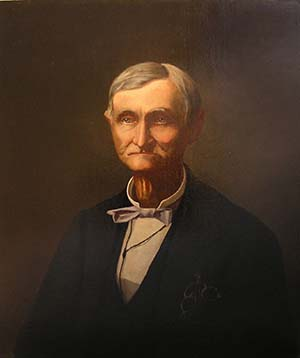
- Born: October 29, 1819; Clarksville, Tennessee
- Died: April 19, 1892 (aged 72); New Orleans, Louisiana
- Occupations: Judge, lawyer
- Known for: Justice of the Louisiana Supreme Court
- Children: Robert H. Marr Jr.

Robert Hardin Marr (October 29, 1819 – April 19, 1892) was a justice of the Louisiana Supreme Court from January 9, 1877, to April 5, 1880. He played important roles in two major incidents of mob violence in New Orleans. In 1874, he led a group of thousands of armed men that temporarily overthrew the elected government of Louisiana in an event known as the Battle of Liberty Place.

== Life and career ==
Born in Clarksville, Tennessee, Marr was a presidential elector for John Bell in 1860. He was president of the 1874 Democratic State Convention.

=== Battle of Liberty Place ===
In 1874, while a judge of Louisiana's First Judicial District Court (Orleans Parish), Marr was a leader of the Crescent City White League, a white vigilante group that sought to overthrow the elected Republican government of Louisiana. On the morning of September 14, Marr led a mass rally at the Henry Clay statue on Canal Street and was appointed to, with four others, visit Gov. William Pitt Kellogg to demand "his immediate abdication".

A Kellogg staffer told the "Committee of 5" that the governor refused accept the group's message because he regarded a large gathering of armed men "a menace." Marr then returned to the Canal Street rally and asked the crowd to go to their homes, grab their guns, and return at 2:30 p.m. That afternoon, those White Leaguers began a multi-day assault on the state government, forcing Kellogg into seclusion in the federal custom house and declaring Democrat John McEnery the new governor — an event known as the Battle of Liberty Place. The White League maintained control of the state government until President Ulysses S. Grant sent in federal troops on September 19.

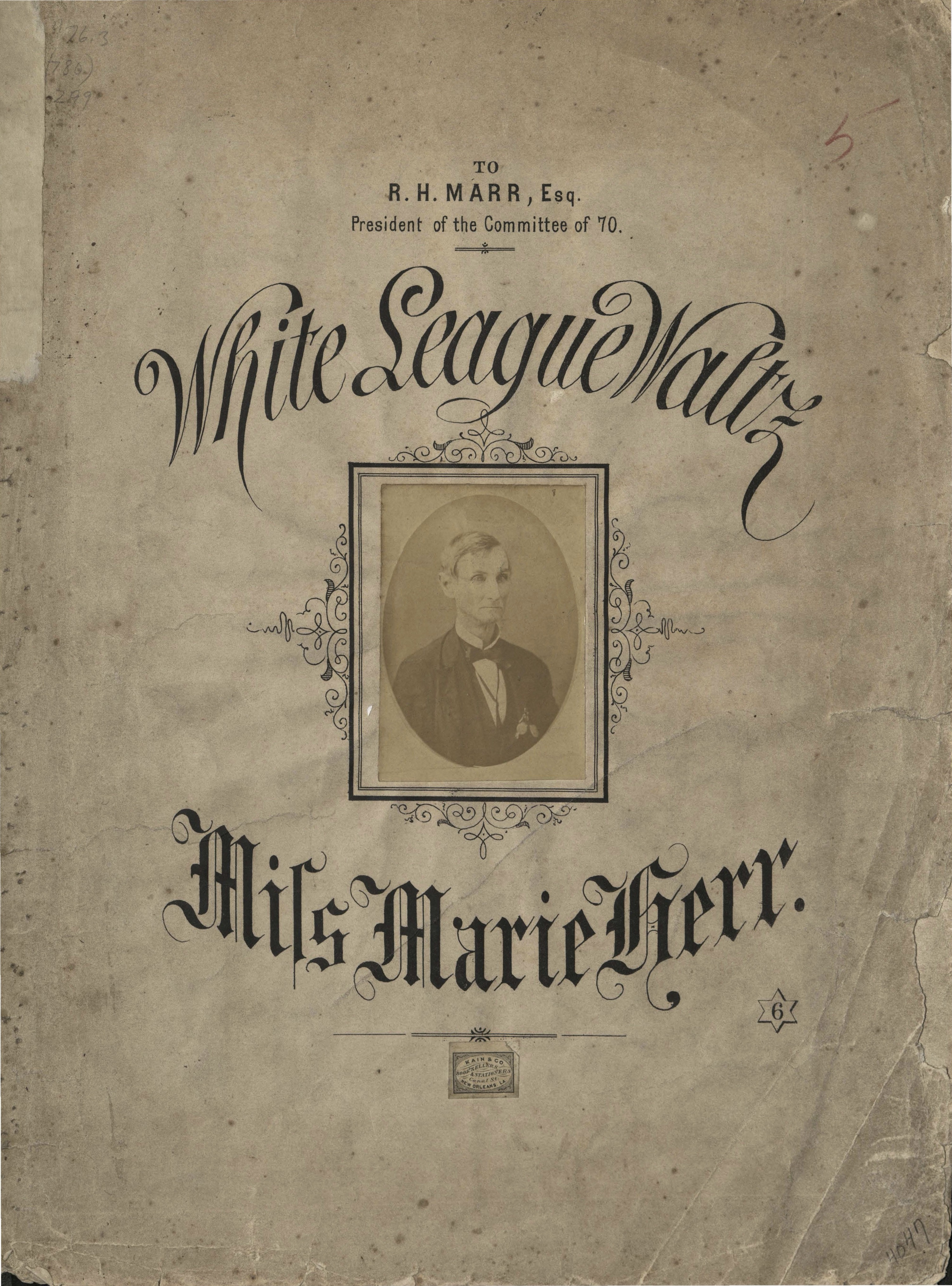
"White League Waltz", a song written to celebrate the Battle of Liberty Place and dedicated to Marr

Marr was lauded by White Leaguers statewide as a hero. One New Orleans woman wrote a piece of music titled "The White League Waltz" and dedicated it to Marr.

=== Claimed appointment to U.S. Senate ===
McEnery, though not in actual control of the state government once troops returned, continued to argue that he was governor for the entirety of his "term". In December 1875, McEnery nominated Marr to fill the vacant U.S. Senate seat caused by the resignation of William L. McMillen, who McEnery had similarly "appointed". The Senate took no action to accept Marr's appointment and he did not serve.

=== Louisiana Supreme Court ===
The next gubernatorial election, in 1876, was also marred by white violence and fraud aimed at installing Democratic nominee Francis Tillou Nicholls. Both Nicholls and Republican opponent Stephen B. Packard claimed victory. As part of the Compromise of 1876 that gave Republican Rutherford B. Hayes as president, Hayes agreed to recognize Nicholls as Louisiana governor.

Nicholls then appointed Marr as an associate justice to the Louisiana Supreme Court, alongside Alcibiades DeBlanc, founder of the Knights of the White Camelia terror group. Marr served on the court until 1880, when the state's new constitution allowed Governor Louis A. Wiltz to appoint a new slate of justices, replacing Nicholls'.

=== 1891 lynchings of Italians ===
In 1888, Nicholls was elected to another term as governor, and he appointed Marr to the Criminal District Court in New Orleans. On August 6, 1888, he was sworn in.

On March 13, 1891, a New Orleans jury failed to convict nine Italian men for involvement in the assassination of police chief David Hennessy. Jurors acquitted six of the men and declared a mistrial for the other three. The following day, a mob led by many of New Orleans' most prominent business and political leaders again met at the Henry Clay statue on Canal Street. That mob lynched 11 Italian men, in what some scholars consider the largest single mass lynching in American history.

On March 17, a grand jury convened to investigate the lynchings, with Marr presiding. The grand jury spent most of its time investigating the trial court's verdicts rather than the lynchings that followed.

While the grand jury was convened, Marr told news reporters that indictments against the lynchers would be impossible. "It was impossible to criminally prosecute 5,000 persons, he said, and referred to the famous passage in Burke's oration that there is no law under which a whole country can be indicted. Even if the Grand Jury were to indict the leaders no jury could ever be secured to try them."

Following Marr's lead, in its report, the grand jury found that the lynchings were "directly traceable to the miscarriage of justice as developed in the verdict rendered on the 13th of March" and that the lynch mob "embraced several thousand of the first, best, and even the most law-abiding of the citizens of this city." The grand jury declined to indict any of the lynchers: "The magnitude of this affair makes it a difficult task to fix guilt upon any number of the participants; in fact, the act seemed to involve the entire people of the parish and city of New Orleans, so profuse is their sympathy and extended their connection with the affair."

After the grand jury's conclusion, Marr's son, Robert Hardin Marr, Jr. — at the time a New Orleans city judge — wrote in the American Law Review that many of the lynch mob's leaders "are among my own personal friends; with some of them I am connected by the ties of a long and intimate friendship; and thus I know the purity of their intentions."

=== Plessy v. Ferguson ===
It was in the jurisdiction of Marr's criminal court that Homer Plessy deliberately boarded a whites-only train car in New Orleans in order to challenge Louisiana's Separate Car Act of 1890, which required "equal, but separate" railroad accommodations for white and black passengers. The case — which would go on to be one of the most infamous in Supreme Court history — would have been known as Plessy v. Marr were it not for Marr's death on April 19, 1892. Instead, it was named Plessy v. Ferguson for John Howard Ferguson, who was appointed by Governor Murphy J. Foster to replace Marr.

== Personal life and death ==
His son, Robert H. Marr Jr., became a New Orleans city judge and an Orleans Parish district attorney.

On April 19, 1892, Marr disappeared near the Mississippi River. He was last seen "leaning over the breakwater" at a point where "there is a strong current and the water is very deep." After several days of searching, he was presumed dead. His body was never found.

Political offices
Preceded by Newly reconstituted court	Justice of the Louisiana Supreme Court; 1877–1880	Succeeded by Court reorganized again
