= Andrew Dumont =

Louisiana reconstruction era American politician

Louisiana House of Representatives
- In office 1872–1874

Louisiana State Senate
- In office 1874–1878

Personal details
- Born: c. 1845
- Died: June 30, 1885 (aged 39–40)
- Party: Republican

Andrew J. Dumont (c. 1845 - June 30, 1885) was a state legislator who served in the Louisiana House of Representatives and Louisiana State Senate during the Reconstruction era.

== Biography ==
Dumont was born a free man in 1845 in Plaquemines Parish, Louisiana, to mixed parents and a French father. He emigrated to Mexico where he obtained his education and served under Emperor Maximilian I of Mexico as an officer in the army. After the surrender of Maximilian he started his own distillery but became dissatisfied with his life in Mexico.

He returned from Mexico to Louisiana in 1866 and started as a distiller in New Orleans, and became involved with politics almost immediately.

During the reconstruction era he held a number of offices from police sergeant, a U.S marshal deputy, customs officer and recorder of Algiers.

In 1872 Dumont was elected to the Louisiana House of Representatives and served until 1874 when he was elected to the Louisiana State Senate and served from 1874 until 1878. During his senatorial service he was elected to be the chairman of the Republican state central executive committee from 1874 and served in that position until his death. He was a colonel in the state militia and fought against the White League in the New Orleans 1874 insurrection.

He was appointed to the post of Naval Officer for New Orleans in July 1880, replacing James Lewis. His ability with several foreign languages made him popular in the job as he could talk to many sailors in their native languages.

The A. J. Dumont Base Ball Club was formed in the 1880s in Algiers and named after Dumont who was their patron.

In 1881 he was selected along with eleven others to go to Washington to present an address outlining the views of the Louisiana Republicans to President James A. Garfield.

A series of family and financial issues led him to commit suicide by shooting himself with a revolver at his home in Algiers, New Orleans on June 30, 1885. He was survived by his wife and two children.

== See also ==
- African American officeholders from the end of the Civil War until before 1900
