= USS Ozark (1863) =

American river monitor

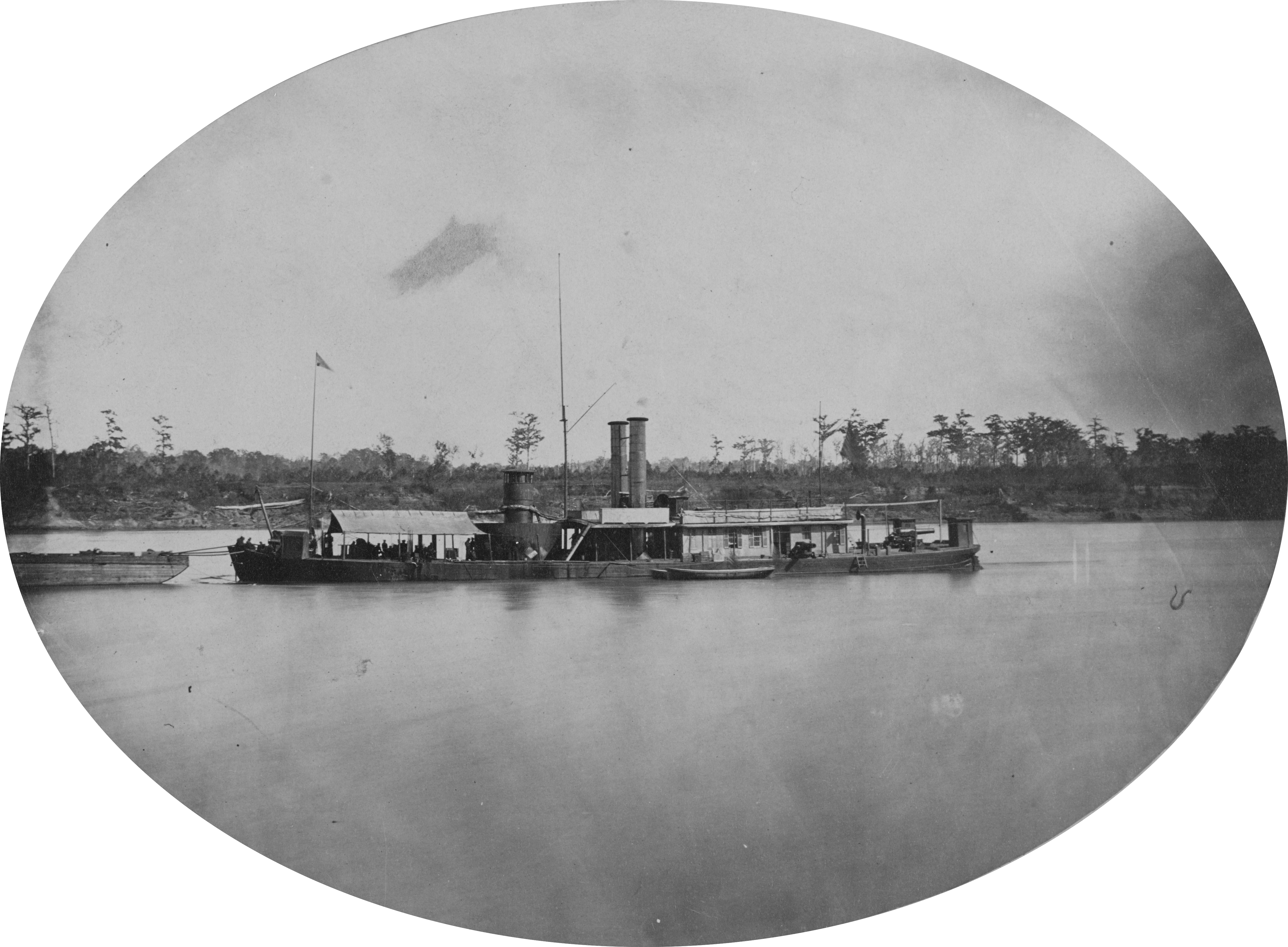
- Ozark serving in the Mississippi River Squadron in 1864–65

Class overview
- Operators: United States Navy
- Preceded by: Neosho class
- Succeeded by: Milwaukee class
- Completed: 1
- Scrapped: 1

History

United States
- Name: USS Ozark
- Namesake: The Ozark Tribe of the Quapaw Indians
- Awarded: 14 May 1862
- Builder: George C. Bestor
- Cost: About $215,000
- Laid down: 1862
- Launched: 18 February 1863
- Commissioned: 18 February 1864
- Decommissioned: 24 July 1865
- Fate: Sold, 29 November 1865

General characteristics
- Tons burthen: 578 bm
- Length: 180 ft (54.9 m)
- Beam: 50 ft (15.2 m)
- Draft: 5 ft (1.5 m)
- Depth of hold: 7 ft 4 in (2.2 m)
- Installed power: 4 × boilers
- Propulsion: 4 × Shafts; 2 × 2-cylinder steam engines
- Speed: 9 miles per hour (14 km/h)
- Complement: 120
- Armament: 1 × 2 - 11-inch (279 mm) smoothbore Dahlgren guns; 1 × 1 - 10-inch (254 mm) Dahlgren guns; 3 × 1 - 9-inch (229 mm) Dahlgren guns
- Armor: Gun turret: 6 in (152 mm); Side: 2.25–2.5 in (57–64 mm); Deck: 1 in (25 mm)

USS Ozark was a single-turreted river monitor built for the United States Navy during the American Civil War. The ship served in the Mississippi River Squadron during the war, and participated in the Red River Campaign shortly after she was commissioned in early 1864. Ozark patrolled the Mississippi River and its tributaries after the end of the campaign for the rest of the war. She was decommissioned after the war and sold in late 1865.

The ship's activities or owner are not known after her sale, but Ozark transported Federal troops and New Orleans police attempting to apprehend the white supremacists who killed numerous blacks during the Colfax Massacre in 1873. She ferried witnesses back and forth to their homes on the Red River during the subsequent trials in 1874. Her ultimate fate is unknown.

== Description ==
The ship was 180 feet (54.9 m) long overall and had a beam of 50 feet (15.2 m). She had a depth of hold of 7 feet 4 inches (2.2 m) and a draft of six feet. Ozark had a tonnage of 578 tons burthen.

She was powered by a pair of two-cylinder steam engines, each driving two four-bladed, 7-foot (2.1 m) propellers, using steam generated by four boilers. The engines were designed to reach a top speed of 9 miles per hour (14 km/h). They had a bore of 15 inches (381 mm) and a stroke of 24 inches (610 mm). Ozark could carry about 100 long tons (102 t) of coal. All of the machinery was built by the Franklin Foundry of St. Louis, Missouri.

The ship was fitted with three rudders, and the armored pilothouse was mounted on top of the gun turret. The officers' staterooms were built on deck out of light pine, and a hurricane deck was positioned between the turret and the deckhouse, between the two funnels. The hull was subdivided by three transverse and three longitudinal watertight bulkheads.

Ozark's main armament initially consisted of two smoothbore, muzzle-loading 11-inch (279 mm) Dahlgren guns mounted in a twin-gun turret forward. The 11-inch gun weighed 16,000 pounds (7,300 kg) and could fire a 136-pound (61.7 kg) shell up to a range of 1,710 yards (1,560 m) at +5° elevation. By July 1864, her armament had been reinforced by the addition of one 10-inch (254 mm) Dahlgren gun and three 9-inch (229 mm) Dahlgrens, all on pivot mounts. One of these guns was mounted at the bow, another at the stern and the two others were abreast the deckhouse, one on each broadside. The 10-inch Dahlgren weighed 12,500 pounds (5,700 kg) and could fire a 103-pound (46.7 kg) shell up to a range of 3,000 yards (2,700 m) at +19° elevation. The nine-inch gun weighed 9,200 pounds (4,200 kg) and could fire a 72.5-pound (32.9 kg) shell to a range of 3,357 yards (3,070 m) at an elevation of +15°. Ozark was chosen as the testbed for an experimental "underwater battery" that consisted of a nine-inch Dahlgren gun firing through a pipe in the side of the hull below the waterline. Cost overruns caused the project to be cancelled in January 1863 before it could be tested.

The cylindrical Ericsson-style turret was armored with six layers of wrought iron 1-inch (25 mm) plates. The forward 40 feet (12.2 m) of the hull was protected by two layers of 1.25-inch (32 mm) plates that extended 1 foot (0.3 m) below the waterline. Aft of the bow section, the hull's armor consisted of two layers of 1.125-inch (28.6 mm) plates. The ship's deck was protected by iron plates one inch thick.

== Construction and service ==
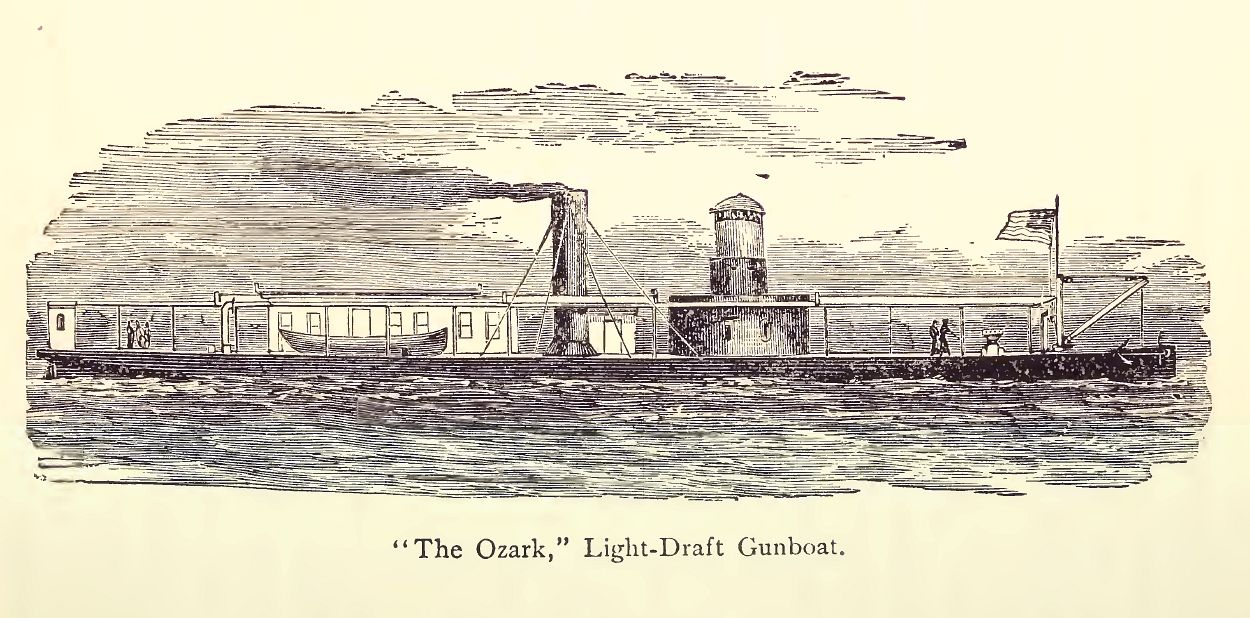
Engraving of USS Ozark

The contract for Ozark, the first ship of that name in the United States Navy and named for the Ozark Tribe of the Quapaw Indians, was awarded to George C. Bestor on 14 May 1862. He subcontracted the ship's construction to Hambleton, Collier & Co. at their Mound City Marine Ways shipyard in Mound City, Illinois. Ozark was laid down in 1862 and launched on 18 February 1863. She was towed to St. Louis for fitting out and arrived there on 27 February. Ozark commissioned on 18 February 1864, with Acting Volunteer Lieutenant George W. Brown in command. She cost about $215,000.

Ozark spent her entire Union Navy career serving in the Mississippi River Squadron. From 12 March to 22 May 1864, she took part in the Rear Admiral David Porter's Red River Expedition to Alexandria, Louisiana. During the retreat down the Red River, Ozark was trapped above the falls at Alexandria, along with most of the other ironclads of the Mississippi Squadron, when the river's water level unexpectedly began to fall. Two temporary dams, known as Bailey's Dam, had to be built in April–May to raise the water level high enough to allow the ironclads to proceed downstream. After the end of the campaign, Ozark was assigned to the Third District, patrolling the Mississippi River between Morganza, Louisiana and Fort Adams, Mississippi. Following the end of the war, she was decommissioned at Mound City on 24 July 1865 and was sold 29 November.

The identity of her purchaser is not known, nor are her activities after her sale, but Ozark was still in service in late 1873 and based at New Orleans. Louisiana governor William Pitt Kellogg used the ship to transport 35 soldiers of the 19th Infantry Regiment and 25 mounted members of the New Orleans Metropolitan Police to Colfax, Louisiana in October to apprehend the perpetrators of the Colfax Massacre. Due to widespread resistance by local whites, only a few men were arrested and transported to New Orleans by Ozark to stand trial in December. Prosecution witnesses were transported and housed in the ship during the trials in February–March 1874 to protect them from threats made by white supremacists. Nothing further is known about the Ozark's activities or fate.
