= James Lewis (Louisiana politician) =

African-American soldier and Republican politician in Louisiana (1832 – 1914)

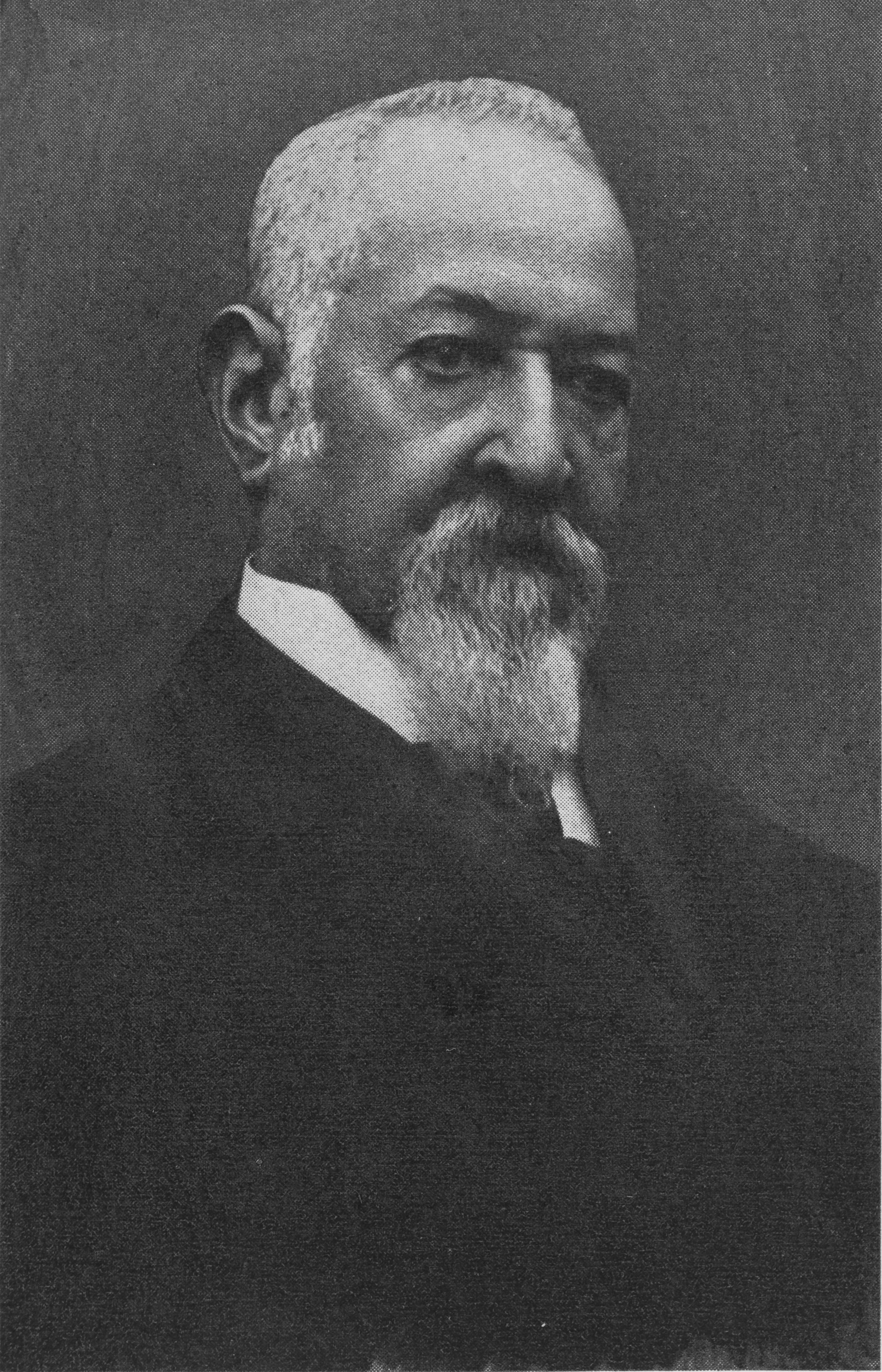
- Lewis in 1908
- Born: 1832; Wilkinson County, Mississippi, US
- Died: July 11, 1914 (aged 81–82); New Orleans, Louisiana, US
- Occupations: Soldier, politician
- Political party: Republican
- Military career
- Allegiance: United States of America
- Branch: United States Army
- Service years: 1862–1864
- Rank: Captain
- Units: First Louisiana Volunteer Native Guards, Company K

James Lewis (c. 1832 – July 11, 1914) was an African-American soldier and politician in Louisiana. Born into slavery and of mixed race, during the American Civil War he left a position as steward on a Confederate steamboat to move to New Orleans, which had been taken over by Union troops. There he helped organize the First Louisiana Volunteer Native Guards, becoming captain of Company K and serving until 1864. After the war he became politically active in the Republican Party during the Reconstruction era, where he was an ally of several other leading men of color in the city and state.

This was an especially violent time in Louisiana and New Orleans politics, but Lewis survived for decades as a political leader. He initially worked for the Freedmen's Bureau, where he was an agent to raise money and establish schools for freed slaves. He was appointed as a federal customs inspector for a short period, the first man of African descent to gain a federal civil position in the state. He was recalled for political reasons.

Lewis later entered the New Orleans Metropolitan Police force, but left in 1872 after more political machinations. He emerged from the immediate postwar period as a leader in the New Orleans Republican Party. For much of the 1870s, 1880s, 1890s, and 1900s, he held state and federal-level Republican-appointee government positions, usually in the United States Treasury Department. He also served for years under Republican administrations as the surveyor-general of Louisiana and Mississippi.

He was also a Freemason and a leader in the Grand Army of the Republic, a Civil War veterans organization.

== Early life ==
James Lewis was born into slavery in Wilkinson County, Mississippi in 1832. His father was a white planter, his master, and his mother was an enslaved woman of mixed race (mulatto). He was raised in Bayou Sara, Louisiana. Before the American Civil War (1861–1865), Lewis worked on steamboats on the Mississippi River, including the steamboat Ingomar, where he served and formed a friendship with Robert Reed Church; he also befriended Norris Wright Cuney by steamboat work. All three became political leaders after the Civil War.

== Civil War ==
At the beginning of the Civil War, Lewis served as a steward on the CSS De Soto and was present at the fighting at the Battle of Belmont in November 1861 and the Battle of Island Number Ten and New Madrid in February, March, and April 1862. Lewis believed the war was a chance to fight for the freedom of all blacks. He fled through danger to New Orleans shortly after its capture by Union Forces under David Farragut and Benjamin Butler in late April and early May 1862, to join Union forces.

In New Orleans, Lewis resolved to become a soldier. Together with other blacks, he asked for permission to raise a regiment of colored troops. Lewis raised two companies of colored infantry and was mustered into the First Louisiana Volunteer Native Guards as captain of one of these, Company K. While a minority of the members had been free men of color before the war, the majority of troops were slaves newly freed by their escape from plantations and joining Union lines.

Lewis resigned his commission after the Red River Campaign led by Nathaniel Banks in 1864. Lewis later wrote that he resigned because he was ordered to appear before a Board of Examiners that would rule on his ability to continue as captain, and a member of the board told him that no black officers would be passed. In November 1864, Lewis was authorized to recruit another company of infantry to join the 1st United States Colored Infantry. He offered to do so if allowed to appear before a Board of Examiners and be commissioned as an officer.

In 1864, Lewis married Josephine Joubert of New Orleans, a free woman of color whose family had been slaveholders. For many years the couple lived in a fine house on Canal Street across from Straight University.

== Reconstruction era ==
After the war, Lewis returned to New Orleans, where he worked as a permit and custom-house broker until the opening of ocean trade and the start of the Reconstruction era. He was appointed as traveling agent for the educational department of the Freedmen's Bureau and worked to establish schools for freed slaves throughout Louisiana. He was frequently threatened during his work by ex-Confederates who opposed his efforts. At one point he was captured in North Louisiana and risked death but was rescued by the intervention of a group of fellow Freemasons. He may have been one of the injured in the 1866 New Orleans riot at the Mechanics Institute, when whites rioted against a parade of blacks celebrating suffrage.

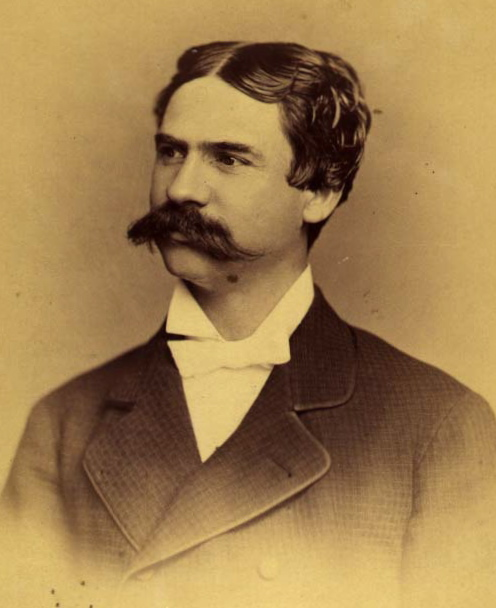
Lewis was at various times an ally and an opponent of Louisiana Republican leader, Henry Clay Warmoth (pictured)

When the Freedmen's Bureau closed, Lewis was appointed by future Governor William Pitt Kellogg — then the collector of customs at the port of New Orleans — as a customs inspector, making him the first black man to have a civil position in the federal service in Louisiana. Lewis became sergeant of the Metropolitan Police in New Orleans. He was successful in this position and was promoted to captain of the police. In 1870, Governor Henry Clay Warmoth appointed Lewis as colonel of the Second Regiment of the State Militia. That year Lewis was also elected to a two-year term as administer of police.

Support for Warmoth among black Louisiana Republicans flagged, and opposition to Warmoth coalesced in what was called the Custom House Ring. It was headquartered at the U.S. Custom House and was led by federal appointees, including Lewis, Stephen B. Packard, a US Marshal; and James F. Casey, Collector of the Port of New Orleans and brother-in-law to President Ulysses S. Grant. The Custom House Ring supported the gubernatorial bid of Speaker of the Louisiana House of Representatives George W. Carter, and Carter and Warmoth violently clashed in late 1871 and early 1872. Fornery Confederate General, James Longstreet, was the head of the Louisiana state militia, and was called to defend the statehouse from an attempt by Carter and the Ring to take over the government. Lewis did not respond to Longstreet's call-up of the militia. Members of his unit were reorganized under more politically reliable officers and did play a role in supporting Warmoth.

== Republican appointee ==
In 1872, at the state Republican Party convention, Lewis was nominated for Congress and made chairman of the Louisiana delegation to the 1872 Republican National Convention in Philadelphia. When he returned to New Orleans, party divisions threatened unity. Lewis declined his congressional nomination in favor of P. B. S. Pinchback. He campaigned for William P. Kellogg for governor and was nominated and elected as administrator of public improvements in New Orleans. His opponents in that race were former Confederate General P. G. T. Beauregard and Major E. A. Burke. Lewis was well appreciated as a civil servant and noted for his economic efficiency.

In the mid-1870s, Lewis was the only Republican appointee in New Orleans city government. In 1876 he campaigned with then-Governor Packard and was elected by the state legislature to the United States Senate. But he did not take his seat as the state government was taken over by Democrats, and Lewis refused to press his claim.

In 1877, President Rutherford B. Hayes appointed Lewis as naval officer of the port at New Orleans, and he held that position until 1880. In December 1879, Lewis attempted to resolve a political feud between fellow Republicans Emile Detiege and Ernest and Onezyphore Delahoussaye. The four men met in Lewis' office in the Custom House and peace had seemingly been achieved. However, shortly later, Detiege shot and killed the two Delahoussaye brothers.

At the 1880 Republican National Convention, Lewis was one of the old guard of "306" who supported Ulysses S. Grant until the final vote, which was won by eventual president, James A. Garfield.

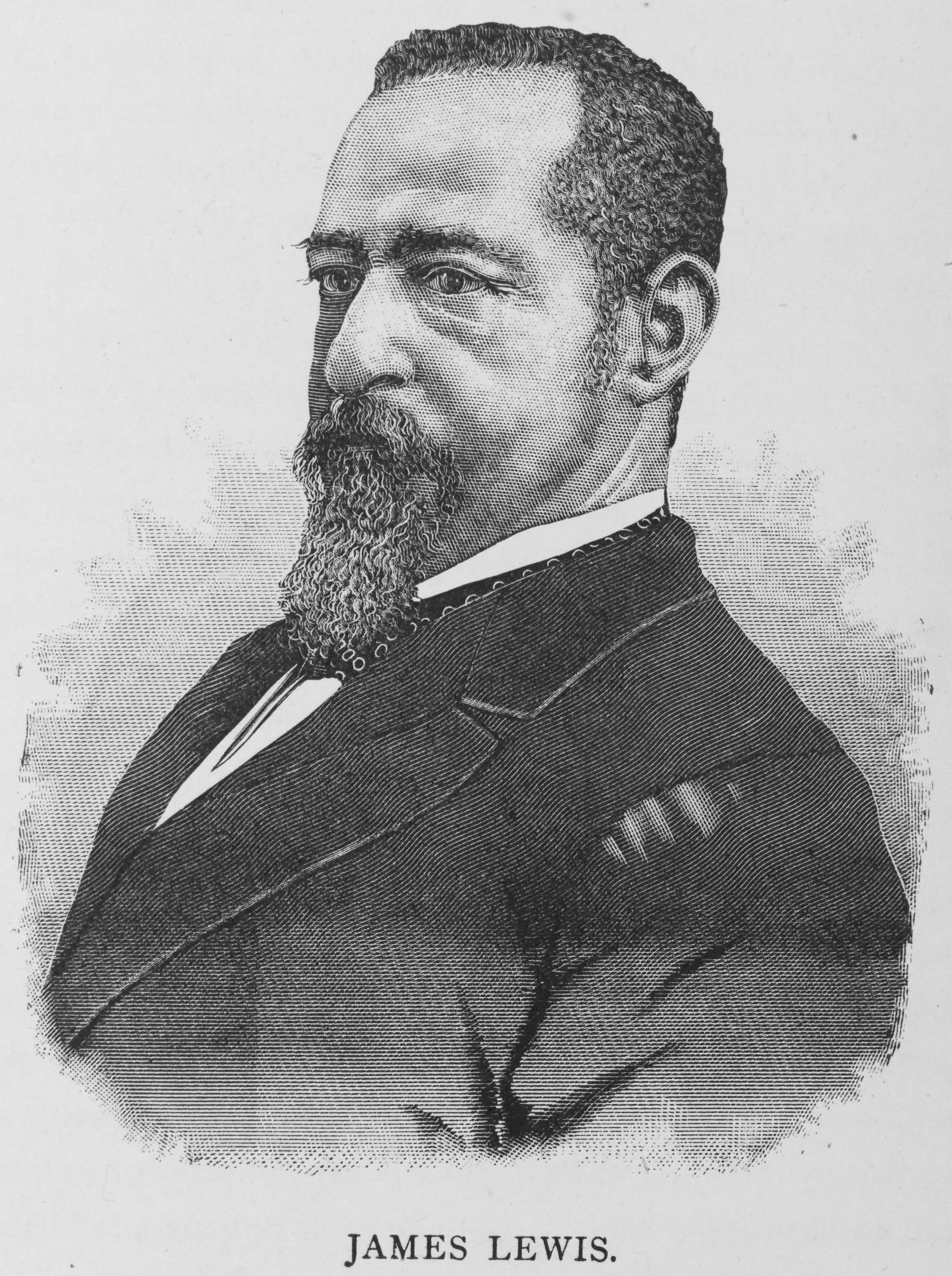
Lewis in 1887

Lewis returned to public life on May 1, 1883, when he was appointed United States Surveyor-General for the Louisiana District to replace James A. Gla, who had been accused of poor management. In January 1884, he was appointed by Secretary of the Treasury Charles J. Folger to superintendent of the United States bonded warehouse in New Orleans and continued to hold the position of surveyor-general of Louisiana.

He continued to serve as surveyor general during the administrations of William McKinley, Theodore Roosevelt, and William Howard Taft, from 1897 to 1913. During this period, Louisiana was dominated by white conservative Democrats, and the legislature passed a new constitution that effectively disenfranchised Lewis and most African Americans. But Lewis was appointed deputy collector of customs and immigration inspector by President Benjamin Harrison in the early 1890s.

In 1884, Lewis served as a commissioner and Chief of the Accommodation Bureau of the Colored People's Exhibit at the World Cotton Centennial, a World's Fair in New Orleans.

In October 1890 Lewis was one of the Committee of Fifty appointed by Mayor Joseph A. Shakspeare to investigate the murder that month of New Orleans Police Department Chief David Hennessy. Italian suspects were rounded up by police. Lewis was one of the signatories of a letter to the Italian community, urging people to inform the committee about the suspects, and threatening extrajudicial action. He was the only man of color on the committee. Nineteen men were arrested. Ultimately eleven Italians were lynched on March 14, 1891 by a mob of 10,000 that stormed the prison where the suspects were held. Some of the victims had already been acquitted at trial and others had not yet been tried.

In the 1890s and early 1900s, Lewis and Walter L. Cohen were the most important political allies in Louisiana of Booker T. Washington, president of Tuskegee Institute and a proponent of moderation in race issues. Lewis was a member of the National Afro-American Council founded by T. Thomas Fortune and heavily influenced by Washington. In 1898, Lewis actively supported black troops being included in the forces sent into the Spanish–American War. Lewis continued to be involved in politics, although the Republican Party was increasingly hampered in the state. By 1898, the political tides had shifted. Lewis supported the Warmoth wing in an atmosphere of Democrats conducting extreme vote suppression of African Americans.

== Other activities ==
In 1890, Lewis claimed that he was a member of a post of the Grand Army of the Republic (GAR) in 1865 and 1866 but that it broke up in the Mechanics Union riot in 1866. Lewis was a part of the push to get black members accepted into the GAR in 1890. He later was Department Commander of the GAR of Louisiana and Mississippi. Lewis was also an active Freemason.

== Personal life and death ==
Lewis was described as having "the massive build and pleasing features of that one of Napoleon's marshals who enjoyed the most human and tender sentiments of the master," and that his "lordly manners" gave him "the peculiar charm of the gentleman of the old school" although more "French than Southern Gentleman".

Lewis' son, James Lewis Jr. was active member of the New Orleans black elite. His daughter, Julia (Lewis) Nickerson (c. 1878 – December 7, 1908) was a violinist and cellist in her husband, William J. Nickerson's orchestra.

Lewis died in New Orleans on July 11, 1914.

== Sources ==
- Ingham, John N., and Lynne B. Feldman. African-American Business Leaders: A Biographical Dictionary. Greenwood Publishing Group, 1994.
