= Vendetta (1999 film) =

1999 HBO movie directed by Nicholas Meyer

- Film poster
- Genre: Crime drama
- Based on: Vendetta by Richard Gambino
- Teleplay by: Timothy Prager
- Directed by: Nicholas Meyer
- Starring: Christopher Walken; Luke Askew; Clancy Brown; Alessandro Colla; Andrew Connolly; Bruce Davison
- Music by: John Altman
- Country of origin: United States
- Original languages: English; Italian

Production
- Executive producers: Gary Lucchesi; Gary Randall; Mark Israel; Nick Pileggi
- Producers: Tony Mark; Sue Jett
- Cinematography: David Franco
- Editor: Ronald Roose
- Running time: 117 minutes
- Production company: HBO Pictures

Original release
- Network: HBO
- Release: July 3, 1999

Vendetta is a 1999 American crime drama television film directed by Nicholas Meyer, written by Timothy Prager, and starring Christopher Walken, Luke Askew, Clancy Brown, Alessandro Colla, Andrew Connolly, and Bruce Davison. Based on the 1977 non-fiction book by Richard Gambino, it depicts the assassination of New Orleans police chief David Hennessy and the consequent March 14, 1891 lynchings of eleven Italian Americans. It aired on HBO on July 3, 1999.

== Premise ==
Nineteen Italian-Americans were accused of the murder of David Hennessy, the police chief of New Orleans. After the acquittal of six and mistrial of three, eleven of them were shot or hanged in the largest mass lynchings of Americans in U.S. history.

== Cast ==
- Christopher Walken as James Houston
- Luke Askew as William Parkerson
- Clancy Brown as Chief Hennessy
- Alessandro Colla as Gaspare Marchesi
- Andrew Connolly as Sheriff Bill Villere
- Bruce Davison as Thomas Semmes
- Joaquim de Almeida as Joseph Macheca
- Andrea Di Stefano as Vincent Provenzano
- Edward Herrmann as D.A. Luzenberg
- Richard Libertini as Giovanni Provenzano
- George N. Martin as Judge Joshua G. Baker
- Pierrino Mascarino as Antonio Marchesi
- Daragh O'Malley as Dominic O'Malley
- Kenneth Welsh as Mayor Joseph Shakspeare
- Gerry Mendicino as Charles Matranga
- Frank Crudele as Angelo Bagnetto
- Vincent Marino as Pietro Monasterio
- Louis Di Bianco as Emmanuel Polizzi
- Peter Didiano as Bastian Incompara
- Giuseppe Tancredi as Umberto Scaffidi
- Megan McChesney as Megan O'Brien
- Stuart Stone as Tony Provenzano
- Nigel Shawn Williams as Samuel Foster
- Anna Mancini as Francesca Marchesi
- Tony Mark as Mayor's Assistant
- Conrad Dunn as Pasquale Corte
- Ian Downie as Priest
- Ron White as Robert Collins
- Jack Newman as Jacob Seligman
- Jack Jessop as William Yochum
- Wayne Robson as Frank Peeter
- Delores Etienne as Emma Thomas
- Joel Gordon as William
- Victor Ertmanis as John Duare
- Richard Blackburn as Warden Davis
- Holly Dennison as Miss O'Brian
- Herbert Johnson as Houston's Servant
- John Healy as Construction Foreman
- James Bearden as Governor Francis T. Nicholls

* Terence Hamilton as Young Boy Waivng Cap

== Production ==
The teleplay by Timothy Prager is based on Richard Gambino's book, Vendetta: The True Story of the Largest Lynching in U.S. History (ISBN 1550711032).

Principal photography took place near Kingston, Ontario, Canada.
