= Edgar Howard Farrar =

American lawyer

Edgar Howard Farrar (June 20, 1849 – January 22, 1922) was an American corporate lawyer, political activist, and white supremacist.

== Biography ==
He was born at a plantation in Concordia Parish, Louisiana, the son of Thomas Prince Farrar (his parents Martha Farrar and Thomas.) After home schooling during which he was tutored in Greek and Latin, he attended college at the Baton Rouge Collegiate Institute, then earned his master's from the University of Virginia. He studied law at the University of Louisiana and was admitted to the bar in 1872. In 1874 he was married to Lucinda Davis Stamps, the grand niece of Jefferson Davis, and they had seven children. He was a member of the Louisiana state militia up until 1884, attaining the rank of Colonel.

In 1878-80 he was assistant corporation counsel of the city of New Orleans. He became corporate counsel for the city in 1880. Two years later he was named to the administrative board of the University of Louisiana. In 1882 he became a member of the trustees of the funds that were used to found Tulane University. In 1884 he partnered with Ernest Benjamin Kruttschiit to form a law firm. They were later joined by Senator B. F. Jonas. Farrar became the head of the bar in Louisiana, and had a strong influence throughout the South. He was president of the Louisiana Tax Commission, 1906–1908. From 1910 to 1911 he was president of the American Bar Association.

A major accomplishment during his career as a corporate lawyer was the consolidation of the street railways of New Orleans. This project required him to reconcile many differing groups and goals which some thought irreconcilable.

== Political activism ==
His work as corporate counsel for New Orleans demonstrated to him the need for municipal reform in the city. He became active in various political groups. He was for years chairman of the executive committee of One Hundred to reform the municipal government of New Orleans. He led the Anti-Lottery League's campaign which defeated the proposition to extend the charter of the Louisiana Lottery. He was chairman of the Committee of Fifty, formed in 1891 to investigate the existence of organized crime in New Orleans.

An outspoken white supremacist, Farrar was one of the organizers of the lynching of eleven Italians which occurred that year. Additionally, Farrar was "the leader of the Louisiana disenfranchisement movement".

He was a founder and a prime mover of a campaign to modernize the sewer and water systems of New Orleans. The success of this drive resulted in much improved health statistics for the city. Although previously a loyal Democrat, in 1896 he declined to endorse the Democratic Party's nomination of William Jennings Bryan and bimetallist platform. He helped organize a separate “gold” convention of Democrats. In 1907, he wrote a notable letter to President Theodore Roosevelt invoking the “post roads” clause of the Constitution of the United States in support of federal involvement in road improvement.

== Pamphlets ==
- The Legal Remedy for Plutocracy (1902)
- State and Federal Quarantine Powers (1905)
- The Post Road Power in the Federal Constitution (1907)
