= Lupara =

Italian word for a type of shotgun

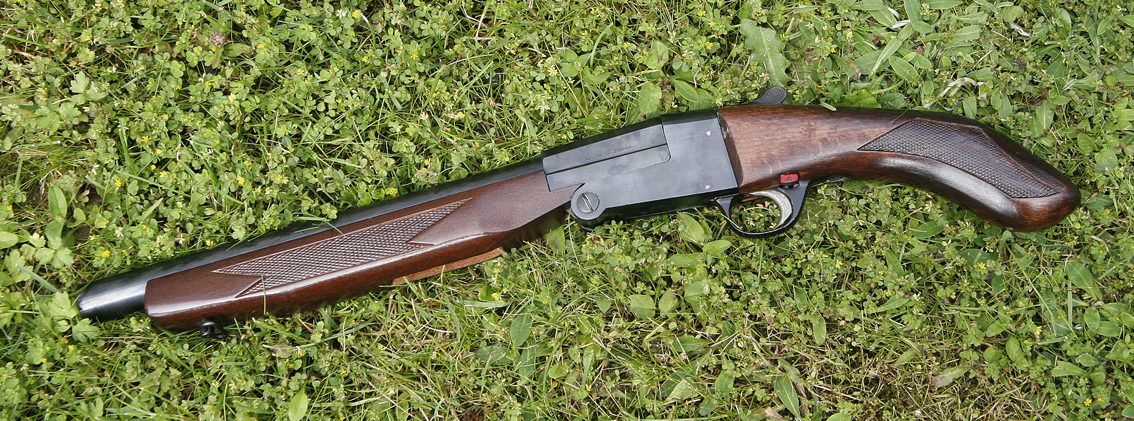
A homemade lupara

A Lupara (Italian pronunciation: [luˈpaːra]) is a sawn-off shotgun of the break-action type. It is traditionally associated with the Sicilian Mafia for their use of it in vendettas, defense, and hunting.

The shortened barrel(s) of a lupara lend themselves to easier handling in wooded areas, or to easier concealment and indoor deployment in urban areas. The absence of a choke and the shortened barrel contribute to a wider spread of shot than that of a choked full-length gun.

== Terminology ==
The word lupara means literally "for the wolf", reflecting its traditional use in wolf hunting. The word achieved wider recognition through Mario Puzo's bestselling novel The Godfather in which the lupara is used extensively by the mafia in Sicily, including Calo and Fabrizio, Michael Corleone's bodyguards in Sicily.

Lupara can indicate also the type of ammunition fired by this gun, usually #3 or #4 buck. Giuseppe Tomasi di Lampedusa, in his novel The Leopard (Il Gattopardo), writes: "... they found him dead ... with twelve bullets in his back" (... lo hanno trovato morto ... con dodici lupare nella schiena). (Lupare is the plural of lupara, so the phrase means "twelve pellets from a lupara".)

From the word lupara comes the Italian expression lupara bianca (white lupara), a term especially used by journalists to refer to a mafia-style slaying in which the victim's body is deliberately destroyed or hidden.

== Criminal usage ==
An early example of criminal use of the weapon in the United States was the assassination of the New Orleans chief of police, David Hennessy, in October 1890. After Chief Hennessy was shot in an ambush, four luparas were found at the murder scene. The murder punctuated a rivalry between gangs of Sicilian fruit company stevedores whose contracts did not fall under the auspices of the local longshoreman's union. A pile of sawn-off shotguns was displayed after the murder, including a homemade gun with a folding iron stock, and another with a hook on its stock to brace against the arm when firing one-armed. Anti-Italian provocation, following the failed prosecution of a group of suspected men, resulted in a mob assault on the New Orleans Parish Prison and the subsequent lynching of eleven Sicilian prisoners.
