= Battle of Liberty Place =

1874 attempted coup d'état against Louisiana state government

Coordinates: 29.9512°N 90.0638°W

Battle of Liberty Place Battle of Canal Street
- Part of the Reconstruction Era
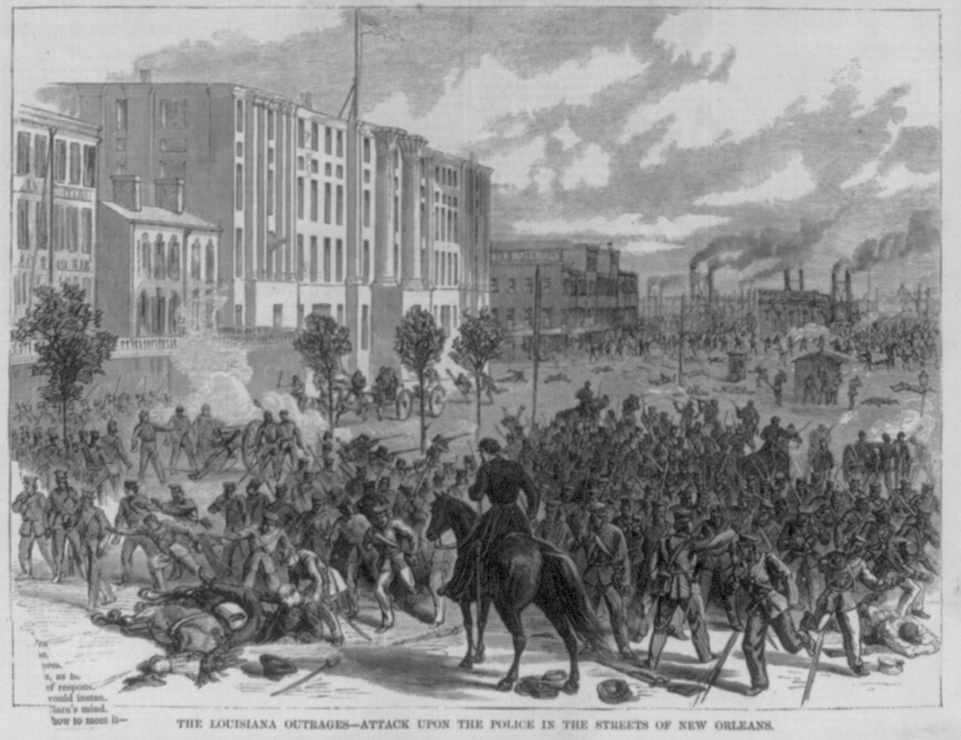
- The "Louisiana Outrages", as illustrated in Harper's Weekly, 1874
| Date | September 14–17, 1874 |
| Location | New Orleans, Louisiana |
| Result | Louisiana state government victory: Rebellion suppressed |

Belligerents
| White League | Louisiana State Government: Metropolitan Police; State Militia |

Commanders and leaders
| Frederick Nash Ogden | James Longstreet (WIA) |

Strength
| 5,000 insurgents | 3,500 police officers and militiamen |

Casualties and losses
| 21+ killed 19 wounded | 11 killed 60 wounded |
- Three civilians killed

The Battle of Liberty Place, or Battle of Canal Street, was an attempted insurrection by the Crescent City White League against the Reconstruction Era Louisiana Republican state government on September 14, 1874, in New Orleans, which was the capital of Louisiana at the time. Five thousand members of the White League, a paramilitary organization made up largely of Confederate veterans, fought against the outnumbered racially integrated New Orleans Metropolitan Police and state militia. The insurgents held the statehouse, armory, and downtown for three days, retreating before arrival of federal troops that restored the elected government. At least 35 people, including at least 21 White League members, were killed in the fighting. No insurgents were charged in the action.

This was the last major event of violence stemming from the disputed 1872 gubernatorial election, after which Democrat John McEnery and Republican William Pitt Kellogg both claimed victory.

== Background ==
The "Battle of Liberty Place" was the name given to the insurrection by its Democratic supporters, as part of their story of the struggle to overturn Republicans and the Reconstruction government. Although this government brought about greater equality and opportunity for blacks, white supremacists saw it as tyranny. In the election of 1872, John McEnery, a Democrat, was supported by a coalition of Democrats and anti-Grant Republicans, including Republican Gov. Henry C. Warmoth. Warmoth's opponents in the Republican Party remained loyal to President Grant, and supported the Republican Party nominee, William Pitt Kellogg.

Governor Warmoth had appointed the State Returning Board, which administered elections; it declared McEnery the winner. A rival board endorsed Kellogg, who had charged election fraud because of the violence and intimidation that took place at and near the polls, as Democrats tried to suppress black voting. The legislature impeached Warmoth and removed him from office for "stealing" the election. Lieutenant Governor P. B. S. Pinchback became governor for the last 35 days of Warmoth's term. Both McEnery and Kellogg had inaugural parties and certified lists of appointed local officeholders. The federal government eventually certified Kellogg as the governor of the state. Similarly, Republican C. C. Antoine was certified lieutenant-governor over Democrat Davidson Bradfute Penn.

In an earlier violent incident related to the disputed election, the Colfax massacre occurred at the courthouse in Grant Parish in April 1873, when a white militia attacked freedmen defending appointed Republican officeholders. This action was also related to political tensions between whites and blacks. In Colfax, three whites and a total of 150 blacks were killed, at least 50 of the latter after having been taken prisoner.

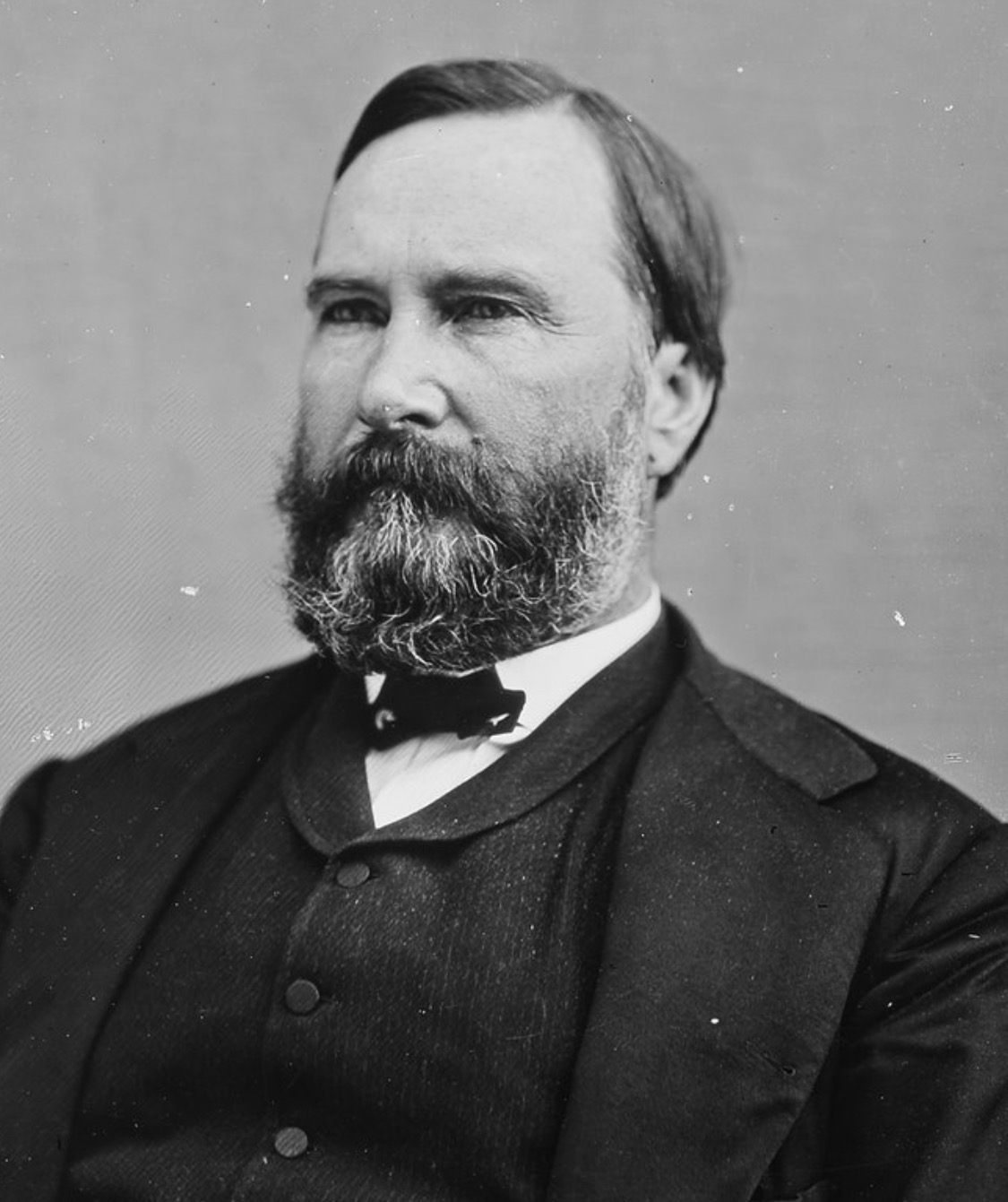
James Longstreet after the Civil War

In 1874, McEnery and his allies formed a "rump" legislature in New Orleans, then the location of state government. The paramilitary White League entered the city with a force of 5,000 to seat McEnery; they fought against 3,500 police and state militia for control. The White League defeated the state militia, inflicting dozens of casualties. The insurgents occupied the state house and armory for three days, with Governor Kellogg finding sanctuary in the Custom House, which was federal property protected by a company of U.S. Army troops. When former Confederate general James Longstreet, aligned with Kellogg and other Radical Republicans and in command of the government forces, was shot, possibly by a spent bullet, he fell or was pulled from his horse; some accounts have him being held prisoner by the insurrectionists afterwards, but this is unlikely.

Kellogg wired for federal troops and, within three days, President Ulysses S. Grant sent federal troops there. The White League insurgents retreated from New Orleans before the federal troops arrived, and no one was prosecuted.

== Battle ==
In response to a call for a mass meeting to protest against the seizure of arms of private citizens, men gathered on Canal Street around 10:00 Monday morning and a committee consisting of Robert Hardin Marr (chairman), Jules Tuyes, Samuel Choppin, James B. Woods, and J. M. Seixas called upon the governor, meeting BG Henry Dibble at the executive office at noon. The governor refused to meet and considered the committee as representing now armed masses a menace. Marr declared that the masses were unarmed, but Dibble countered that while those on Canal Street may be unarmed, beyond there were armed bodies assembled for the same purpose.

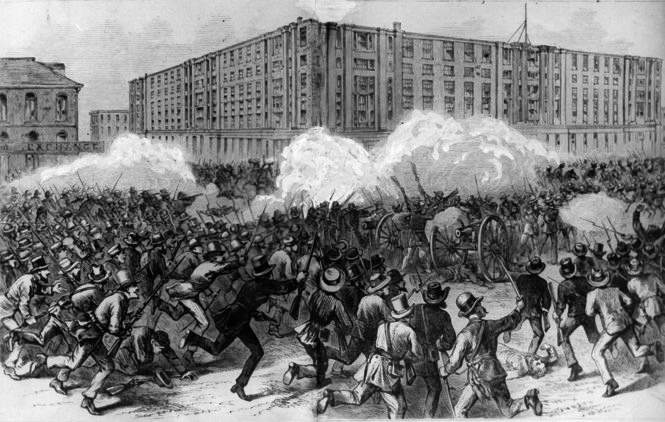
"Battle at the Customs House", an engraving in Frank Leslie's Illustrated Newspaper, 1874

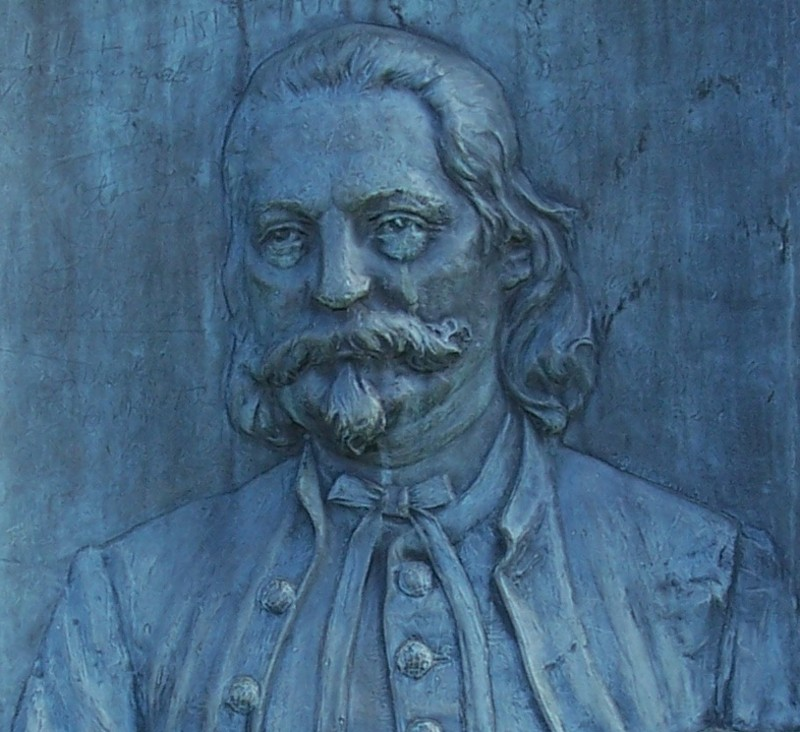
Frederick Nash Ogden

About 4:00 in the afternoon, self-proclaimed Lieutenant Governor D. B. Penn made a proclamation calling on the militia of the state to assemble "for the purpose of driving the usurpers from power". Frederick Nash Ogden was appointed provisional general of the "Louisiana State Militia" (here representing the White League) by Penn and a statement was made to blacks in Louisiana that their rights and property should not be harmed. Already by 3 PM armed men were stationed at the intersection of all streets on the south side of Canal Street, from the river to Clayborne street. At 4 PM, a body of Metropolitan Police with cavalry and artillery, commanded by Longstreet, arrived at Canal Street and ordered the armed citizens to disperse. Once firing began, however, the police broke and the White League captured one piece of artillery. The White League then captured City Hall and the fire alarm telegraph and built a barricade along Poydras Street and from that street to the canal. A company of federal troops protected the custom house but was not involved in the initial conflict, while the White League held the portion of the city above the canal and massed around Jackson Square and the St. Louis Hotel. Most of the barricades were made with street railroad cars.

Among the police killed were Sergeant James McManus, Sergeant J. K. Champaign, Corporal J. F. Clermont, Officers J. Hill, E Simmonds, J. Schields, and H. Ballard. Among the White Leaguers killed were E. A. Toledano, Frederick Moreman, Dick Lindsey, Captain J. M. West, Major J. K Gourdain, and journalist J. M. Cleet. Among those injured was Algernon Sidney Badger, superintendent of the New Orleans Metropolitan Police; born in Boston and a veteran of the Union Army, he had been living and working in New Orleans since the end of the war. Badger's leg was crushed when his horse was killed under him and he had his leg amputated. Many more were injured, including customs agent and future activist-historian Rodolphe Lucien Desdunes.

== Siege ==
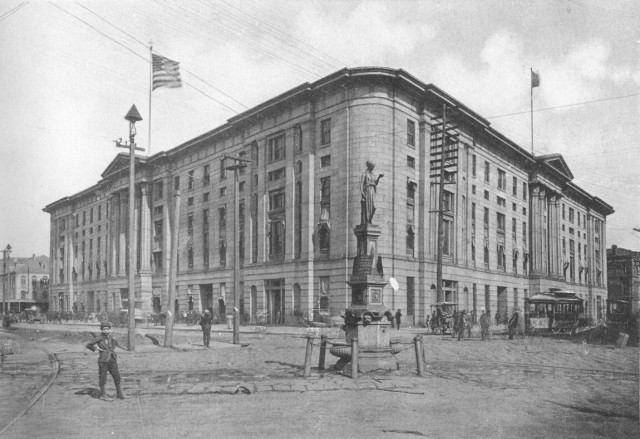
Custom House in 1892

Kellogg, Longstreet and others took refuge in the Custom House on September 14 and 15. By September 17, federal forces were arriving and the situation had reversed, and General William H. Emory met with opposition leaders McEnery, Penn, Marr, and Duncan F. Cage, guaranteeing the freedom from arrest of those involved in exchange for the restoration of the state administration, the return of arms from the state arsenal, and the resumption of the status before the outbreak of violence. The group submitted, insisting no show of force was necessary, but that they regarded Louisiana as no longer a state, but as a province without a democratic government. Later that day a rumor spread that a group of as many as 2000 blacks intended to capture Treme station, but the disturbance was quelled. The 22nd Infantry Regiment was ordered to proceed to New Orleans under General Irvin McDowell; the frigate Colorado and the gunboats Kansas and Shawmut were sent from their station in Key West under Admiral James Robert Madison Mullany. By September 21, the surrender was complete and the temporary police force in the city was replaced by the regular forces.

== Results ==
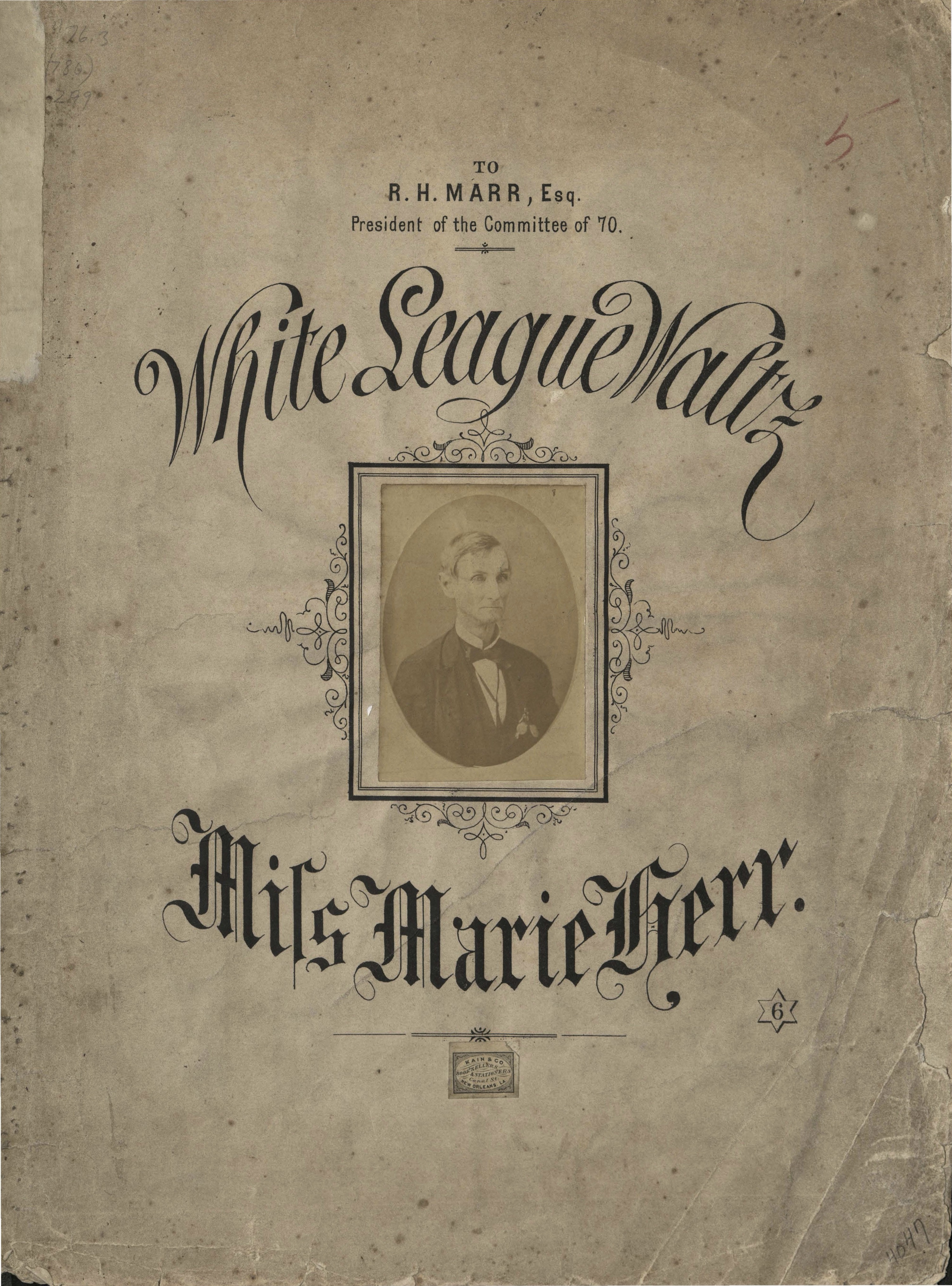
"White League Waltz", a song written to celebrate the Battle of Liberty Place

Grant ordered General Philippe Régis de Trobriand, commanding the 13th Regiment, to the city to protect the state government from violence. On January 4, 1875, Governor Kellogg requested his aid to eject men from the legislature who had not been certified by the Returning Board. Trobriand entered the state house with some men at the governor's request, and escorted the eight men out after they had each given speeches of objection. The Democrats never returned; they set up an alternate legislature meeting at the Odd Fellows Hall in the city. They were committed to their candidate, Francis T. Nicholls, as governor for the next two years. During the remaining period, the Republican gubernatorial claimant, Stephen B. Packard, and legislators effectively controlled only a small part of New Orleans. White Democrats outside the city supported Nicholls. Trobriand and his regiment stayed in the city until January 1877, when federal troops were withdrawn in the 1877 compromise.

== Monument ==
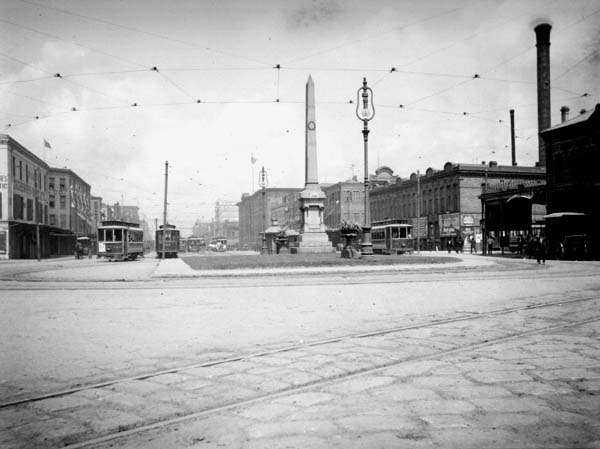
The monument in its original location on Canal Street, 1906

In 1891, the city erected the Battle of Liberty Place Monument to commemorate and praise the insurrection from the Democratic Party point of view, which at the time was in firm political control of the city and state and was in the process of disenfranchising most blacks. The white marble obelisk was placed at a prominent location on Canal Street. In 1932, the city added an inscription that expressed a white supremacist view.

In 1974, the rethinking of race relations after the Civil Rights Movement caused the city to add a marker near the monument explaining that the inscription did not express current philosophy. After major construction work on Canal Street in 1989 required that the monument be temporarily removed, it was relocated to a less prominent location and the inscription was altered to say "in honor of those Americans on both sides of the conflict." In July 2015, New Orleans mayor Mitch Landrieu proposed removing the monument altogether and in December 2015 the New Orleans City Council voted to remove the monument, along with three others deemed a "nuisance" (statues of Gen. Robert E. Lee, Gen. P.G.T. Beauregard and Confederate States President Jefferson Davis). The monument was removed on April 24, 2017, by workers with a police escort, due to threats made by supporters of the monument.

== See also ==
- Insurrection Act of 1807
- Brooks–Baxter War
- List of incidents of civil unrest in the United States
