= Richard Gambino =

American author and educator (1939–2024)

Richard Ignatius Gambino (May 5, 1939 – January 12, 2024) was an American author and educator. A professor emeritus at Queens College, City University of New York, Gambino pioneered the field of Italian-American studies in the 1970s. He is the author of Blood of My Blood: The Dilemma of the Italian Americans (1974) and co-founder of Italian Americana, a peer-reviewed cultural/historical journal devoted to the Italian-American experience.

== Biography ==
Richard Gambino grew up in the Red Hook section of Brooklyn, New York; his father was an Italian immigrant. He earned a Ph.D. in philosophy at New York University.

In 1973, Gambino founded the Italian-American Studies program at CUNY/Queens College. It was the first known offering of its kind in the United States. He published a study of the Italian-American experience titled Blood of My Blood: The Dilemma of the Italian Americans in 1974; it was well received and has become a classic text. That same year, he co-founded Italian Americana with Ernest Falbo and Bruno Arcudi.

In 1999, HBO made a fictionalized film, Vendetta, based on Gambino's non-fiction book by the same name, about the March 14, 1891, lynchings of Italians in New Orleans. The film starred Christopher Walken, Edward Herrmann, and Bruce Davison. Gambino's play about Walt Whitman, Camerado, and another about Pope Pius XII, were performed in the Hamptons on Long Island.

Gambino died on January 12, 2024, at the age of 84.

== Published works ==
- Freedom and Integrated Personality in Spinoza's Ethics (1965)
- Concepts of Mental Disorder and Criminal Responsibility in Law (1968)
- Introduction to Nietzsche the Thinker: A Study by William M. Salter (1968)
- Crime and Punishment: Toward a Policy for Our Time (1969)
- Blood of My Blood: The Dilemma of the Italian Americans (1974)
- A Guide to Ethnic Studies Programs in American Colleges, Universities and Schools (1975)
- Vendetta (1977)
- Bread and Roses (1981)
- Italian-American Studies and Italian-Americans at CUNY: Report and Recommendations (1987)
- Racing with Catastrophe: Rescuing America's Higher Education (1990)
- Multicultural Education: Will Extremists Destroy the Dream? (1992)
- Italian American Autobiographies, contributor (1993)
- Camerado & the Trial of Pius XII : two plays (2013)

== See also ==
- Anthony Julian Tamburri
- Fred Gardaphé
