= Ward heeler =

American political operative

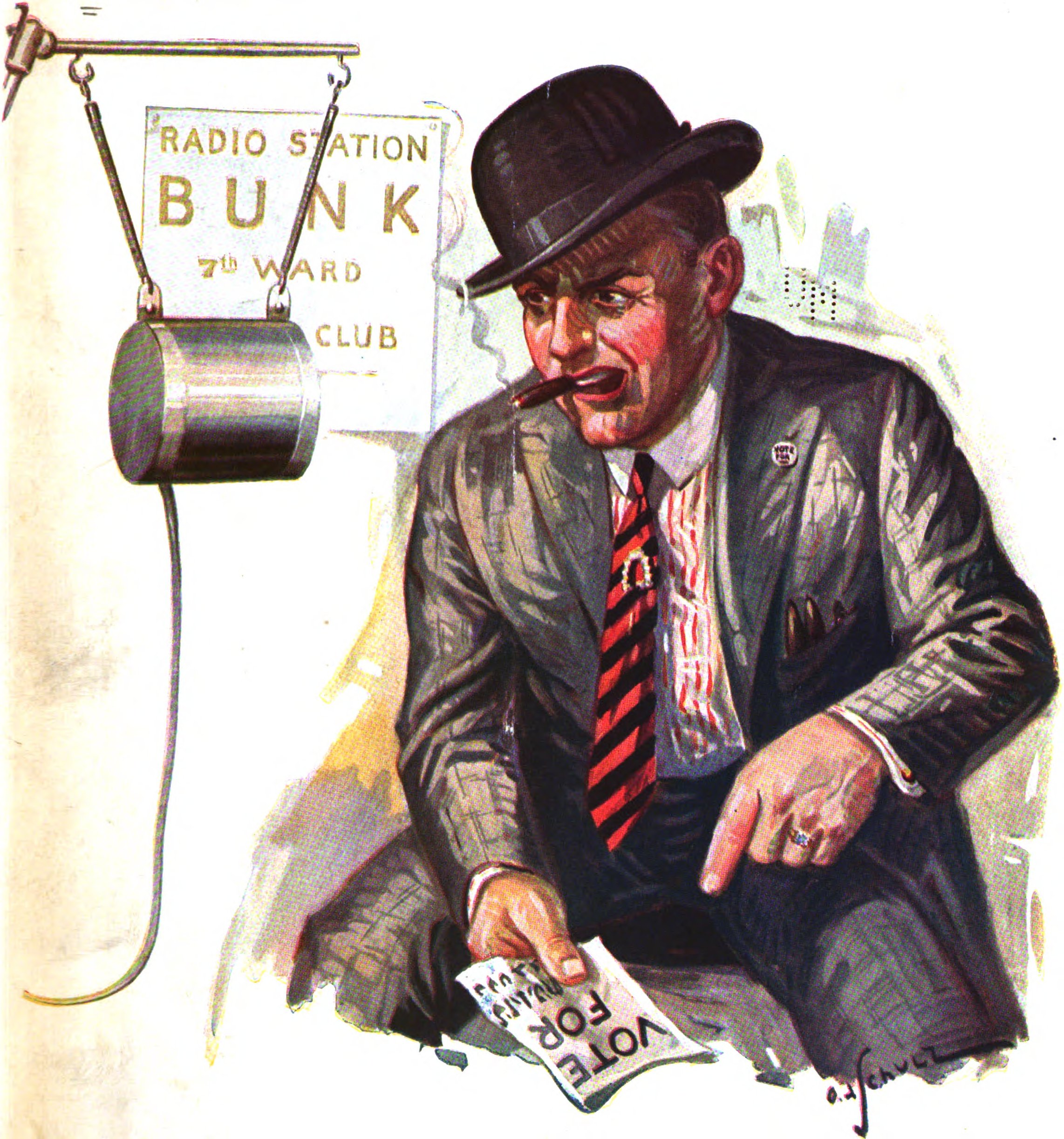
A caricature of a ward heeler haranguing voters over the radio, from a 1922 magazine

A ward heeler is an American urban political operative who works for a political party in a political ward, the smallest electoral subdivision of a city, usually to achieve an election result. The concept often carries connotations of corruption.

A ward heeler may have controlling influence with a small clique in the ward organization. Often, ward heelers have been low-level operatives soliciting votes and performing campaign tasks on behalf of a political boss, including get-out-the-vote efforts, placing campaign signage, coordination of constituent support, etc. In many urban areas, ward heelers also serve as precinct captains.

The term originated during the period of machine politics around the turn of the 20th century, when powerful political machines in major cities run by political bosses—such as the Tammany Hall organization in New York City—used corruption (such as graft and patronage) to maintain their power. So "ward heeler" has the connotation of a corrupt political operative. As integral players in the "spoils system", ward heelers were often both recipients and distributors of patronage, illegal benefits from the political machine. Examples of illegal acts which a ward heeler might do include tearing down an opposition party's posters or paying constituents for their votes. In return for his services the ward heeler was often given a sinecure job, such as in the city's civil service, which was controlled by the organization.

== See also ==
- Political machine
