= Michael L. Kurtz =

American historian

- Born: August 26, 1941; New Orleans, Louisiana, United States
- Died: March 1, 2025 (aged 83); Hammond, Louisiana
- Education: University of New Orleans University of Tennessee Tulane University
- Occupations: Historian; Professor emeritus at Southeastern Louisiana University
- Notable work: Assassination of John F. Kennedy
- Political party: Republican
- Spouse: Isabella Stoddard Kurtz

Michael L. Kurtz (August 26, 1941 – March 1, 2025) was an American professor emeritus of history at Southeastern Louisiana University in Hammond. He was known for his research into the assassination of John F. Kennedy.

== Work ==
Kurtz wrote two books on Kennedy's assassination. Crime of the Century was published in 1982 by University of Tennessee Press and The JFK Assassination Debate: Lone Gunman versus Conspiracy was published in 2006 by University Press of Kansas. Ten years after its release, Crime of the Century was described as the only book on the assassination written by an academic historian. Shortly before the release of his first book, Kurtz stated that he did not think there was enough evidence to show whether or not Lee Harvey Oswald was involved in the assassination, but that there was no question that there was a conspiracy". Kurtz said Kennedy was killed by crossfire from three gunmen, that the Warren Commission's investigation of the assassination was incompetent, and that the Executive branch of the United States government and United States House of Representatives were responsible for suppressing evidence. A review for Kurtz's second book on the assassination said he also accused the Warren Commission, the Central Intelligence Agency, and the Kennedy family of covering up evidence.

In 1995, Kurtz testified on the Kennedy assassination before the Assassination Records Review Board chaired by U.S. District Judge John R. Tunheim. By 2013, Kurtz was reported to have taught a class on the assassination for over 40 years.

Kurtz published on other topics of American history, notably the career of Louisiana Governor Earl Kemp Long, co-authored with the late professor Morgan D. Peoples of Louisiana Tech University.

Kurtz received a Bachelor of Arts from the University of New Orleans, a Master of Arts from the University of Tennessee at Knoxville, and a Ph.D. from Tulane University in New Orleans. In 1984 he became president of the Louisiana Historical Association. He died in Hammond on March 1, 2025.

== Authored works ==
=== Books ===
- Crime of the Century: The Kennedy Assassination from a Historian's Perspective. University Press of Tennessee. 1982. ISBN 978-0870498244.
- The Challenging of America, 1920-1945. Forum Press. 1986. ISBN 978-0882731070.
- (with Morgan D. Peoples) Earl K. Long: The Saga of Uncle Earl and Louisiana Politics. Louisiana State University Press. 1990. ISBN 978-0807115770.
- (as editor) Louisiana Since the Longs: 1960 to Century's End. Center for Louisiana Studies. 1998. ISBN 978-1887366267.
- The JFK Assassination Debates: Lone Gunman versus Conspiracy. University Press of Kansas. 2006. ISBN 978-0700614745.

=== Papers and chapters ===
- "Earl Long's Political Relations with the City of New Orleans: 1948-1960". Louisiana History: The Journal of the Louisiana Historical Association. 10 (3): 241–254. Summer 1969.
- "deLesseps S. Morrison: Political Reformer". Louisiana History: The Journal of the Louisiana Historical Association. 17 (1): 19–39. Winter 1976.
- "Lee Harvey Oswald in New Orleans: A Reappraisal". Louisiana History: The Journal of the Louisiana Historical Association. 21 (1): 7–22. Winter 1980.
- "The Assassination of John F. Kennedy: A Historical Perspective". The Historian. 45 (1): 1–19. November 1982.
- "Political Corruption and Organized Crime in Louisiana: The FBI Files on Earl Long". Louisiana History: The Journal of the Louisiana Historical Association. 29 (3): 229–252. Summer 1988.
- "Paul Morphy: Louisiana's Chess Champion". Louisiana History: The Journal of the Louisiana Historical Association. 34 (2): 175–199. Spring 1993.
- Kurtz, Michael L. (2011). "Organized Crime". In Wood, Amy Louise; Wilson, Charles Reagan (eds.). The New Encyclopedia of Southern Culture. Vol. 19 Violence. Chapel Hill: The University of North Carolina Press. ISBN 9780807869284.
