= New Orleans Metropolitan Police =

The New Orleans Metropolitan Police was a racially integrated police force that existed in New Orleans from 1868 to 1877. It was formed by combining the parishes of Orleans, Jefferson, and St. Bernard into a single police district known as the Metropolitan Police District, State of Louisiana.

In September 1874, it faced an attempted insurrection by the Crescent City White League against the Reconstruction Era Louisiana state government. The conflict was known as the Battle of Liberty Place. The insurrection was eventually put down by federal troops.

== See also ==
- New Orleans Police Department
