= 1790 in architecture =

The year 1790 in architecture involved some significant architectural events and new buildings.

== Events ==
- date unknown – Work begins on the East India Company's Plantation House in Saint Helena, which remains the official residence of the Governor.

== Buildings and structures ==
=== Buildings completed ===
- New church of the Abbey of St Genevieve in Paris, designed by Jacques-Germain Soufflot and finished by Jean-Baptiste Rondelet, is completed to serve as the Panthéon.
- Estrela Basilica in Lisbon.
- All Saints church, Wellington, Shropshire, England, designed by George Steuart.
- Royal Observatory in Madrid, designed by Juan de Villanueva.
- Härnösand Residence in Sweden.
- The Pitot House, New Orleans built by Don Santiago Lorreins (bought by James Pitot in 1809).
- The John Dodd Hat Shop in Danbury, Connecticut, built by lawyer John Dodd.
- The bridge at Warwick Castle, England.
- Monmouth County Gaol, UK, designed by William Blackburn.

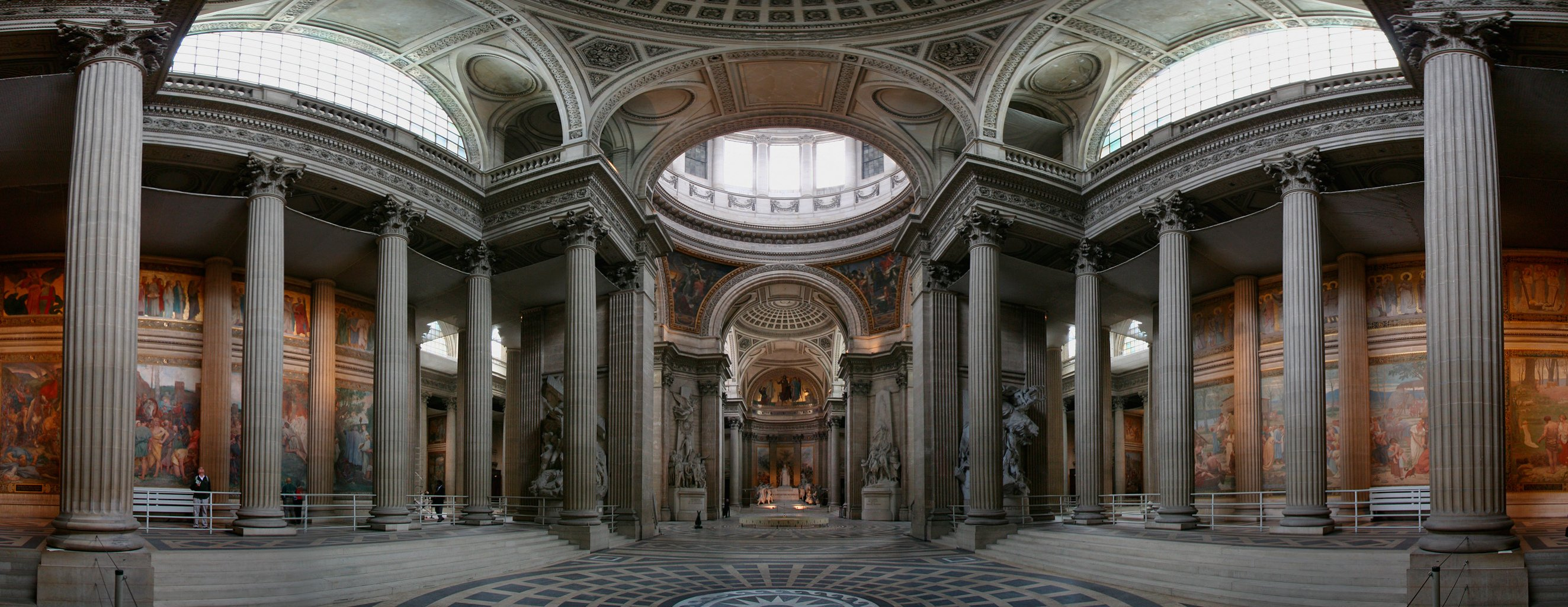
Panthéon

== Births ==
- May 4 – Archibald Simpson, Scottish architect practicing in Aberdeen (died 1847)
- November 7 – Karol Podczaszyński, Polish neoclassical architect (died 1860)

== Deaths ==
- February 16 – John Hawks, American architect (born c.1731)
- November 11 – Nicolò Pacassi, Austrian architect (born 1716)
