= Pitoy =

Pitoy is both a given name and a surname. Notable people with the name include:

- Pitoy Moreno (1925–2018), Filipino fashion designer
- Jendri Pitoy (born 1981), Indonesian football goalkeeper

== See also ==
- Pitot
