= Donna's Law =

Firearm legislation in the United States

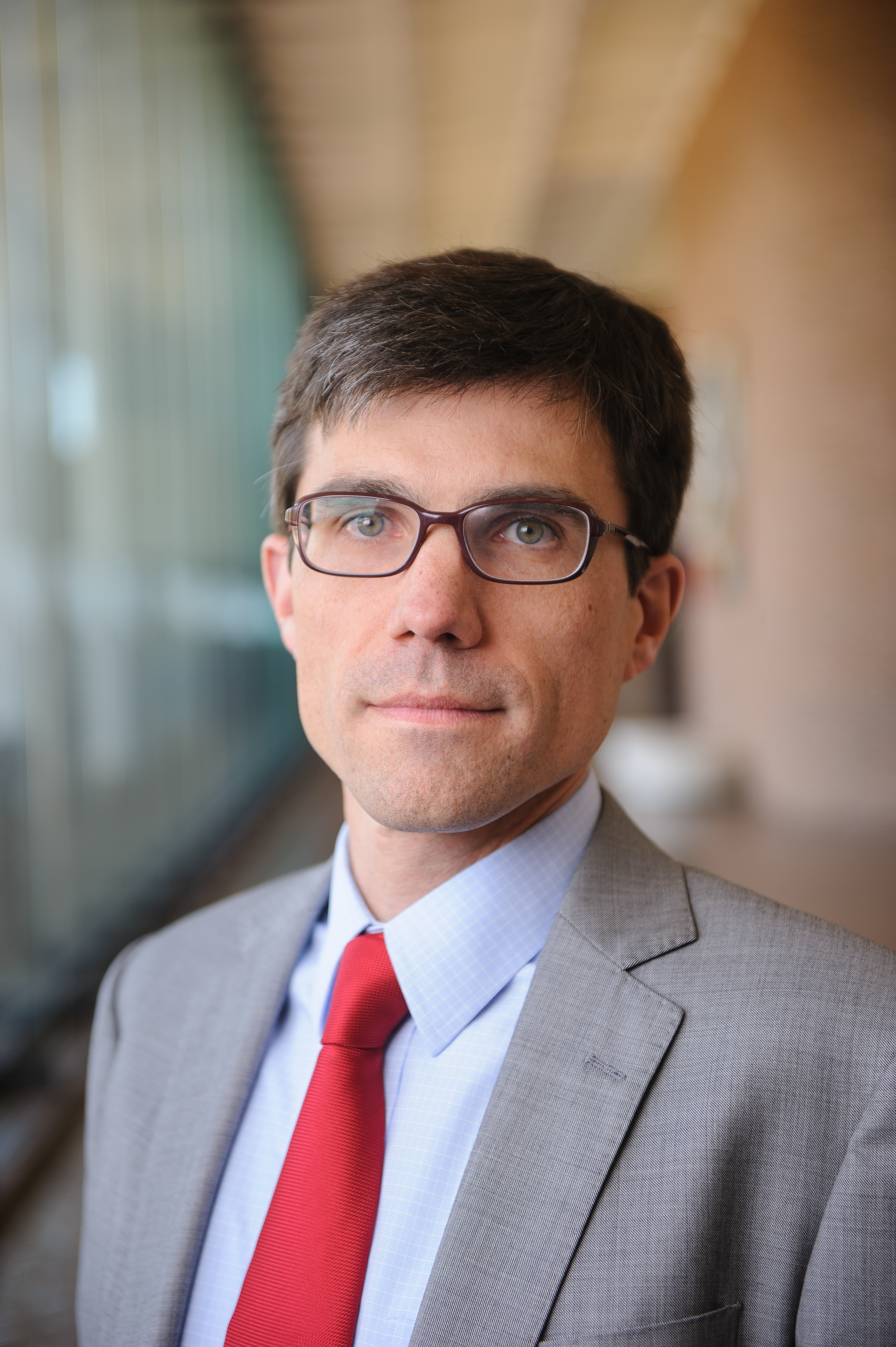
Fredrick Vars, Donna's Law advocate

Donna's Law is a proposed and enacted category of firearm suicide-prevention legislation in the United States that allows individuals to voluntarily place themselves on a firearm purchase prohibition list, preventing them from legally purchasing firearms through background-check systems. The law is named after Donna Nathan (c. 1950-2018), a New Orleans woman who died by suicide with a firearm on June 26, 2018 after purchasing her first gun during a mental health crisis. The concept was developed by legal scholar Fredrick Vars and promoted nationally by Nathan's daughter, Katrina Brees. Donna's Law has been described as a form of self-exclusion or an advance directive for firearm access. As of 2024, versions of Donna's Law have been enacted in Washington, Utah, Virginia, and Delaware, while legislation has been introduced or considered in numerous other states and in the United States Congress.

== Background ==
According to Donna's daughter, Katrina Brees, Nathan sought extensive treatment during the months preceding her death, including voluntary inpatient psychiatric hospitalizations and ongoing care from psychiatrists, family members, and friends. Because her hospitalizations were voluntary rather than involuntary, she was not prohibited under federal law from purchasing a firearm. In 2018, at 67 years old, Nathan purchased a Smith & Wesson revolver from a local gun store and died by suicide later that day near the Tree of Life in New Orleans' Audubon Park.According to her daughter, Nathan had no previous history of gun ownership and was fearful of firearms. Reporting on the case later noted that one of Nathan's final Google searches was "how to hang yourself." According to Brees, search results she reviewed included websites warning that hanging attempts could fail and recommending firearms as a more certain method of suicide; Nathan's subsequent search was for local gun stores. Following her mother's death, Brees became an advocate for firearm suicide prevention and partnered with University of Alabama law professor Fredrick Vars, who himself suffers from bipolar disorder and has experienced suicidal ideation, to develop legislation allowing individuals to voluntarily restrict their own future access to firearm purchases. The proposal became known as "Donna's Law."

== Provisions ==
Donna's Law generally allows an individual to place their name into an existing background check system as a voluntary "do-not-sell" registrant. While enrolled, a firearm purchase subject to the applicable background-check system would generally be denied. Removal is generally subject to a waiting period, which varies by jurisdiction. Supporters characterize the measure as a voluntary and reversible safeguard for individuals concerned about future suicidal crises, substance abuse, impulsive behavior, or other periods of elevated risk. Unlike involuntary firearm prohibitions, participation is initiated solely by the individual. The concept has been compared to self-exclusion programs used in gambling regulation, in which individuals voluntarily restrict their own access to activities they believe may become harmful during future periods of vulnerability.

== Legislative history ==
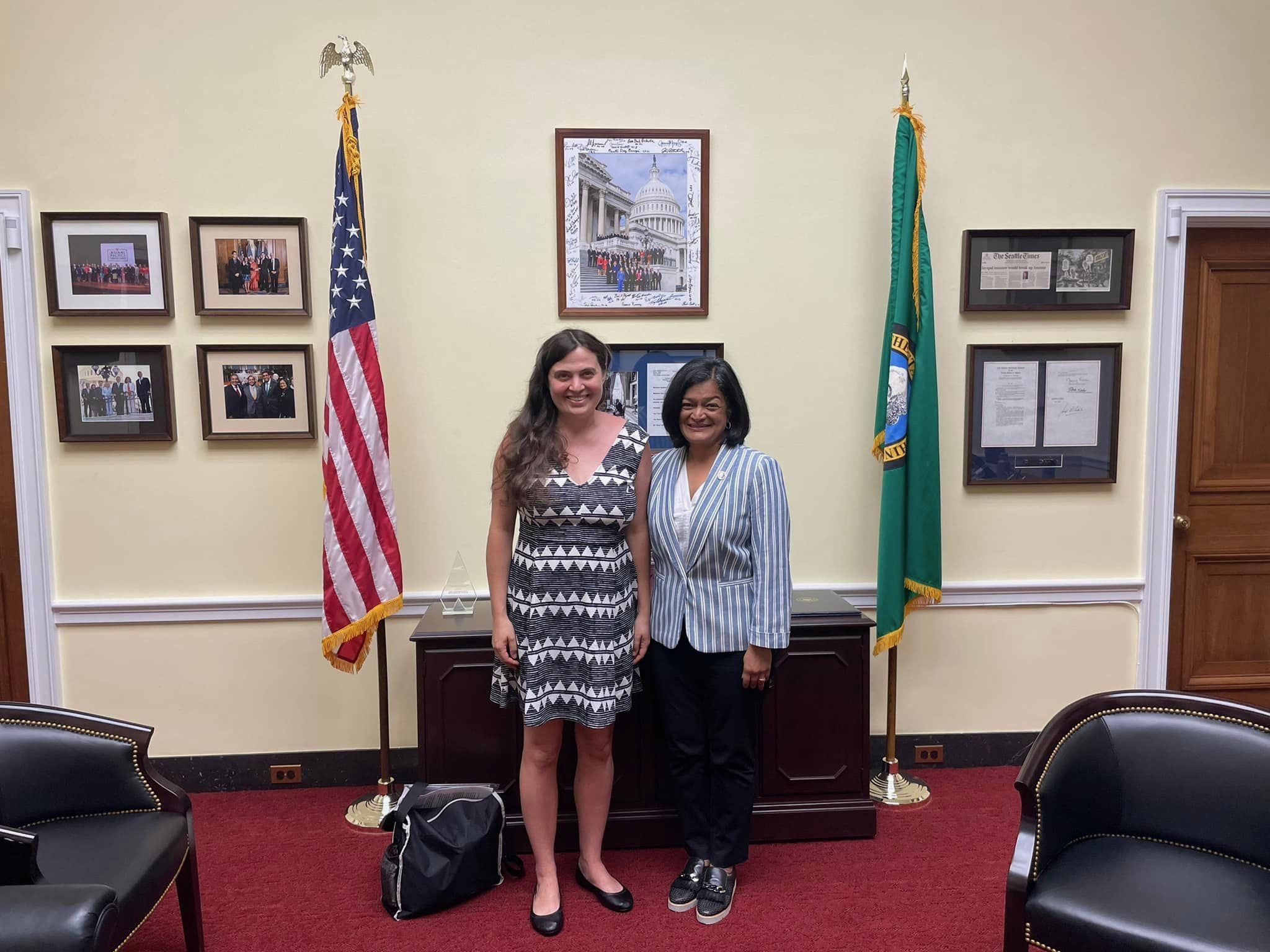
Katrina Brees and U.S. Representative Pramila Jayapal following successful legislation in Washington, 2019

=== Washington ===
Washington became the first state to enact a version of Donna's Law in 2019. The original law required participants to enroll through local courts. Subsequent amendments expanded accessibility, including provisions allowing online registration.

=== Utah and Virginia ===
Utah and Virginia enacted Donna's Law legislation in 2021. Utah's law received bipartisan support and incorporated participation through healthcare providers. Virginia's legislation passed after debate over safeguards intended to prevent unauthorized enrollment.

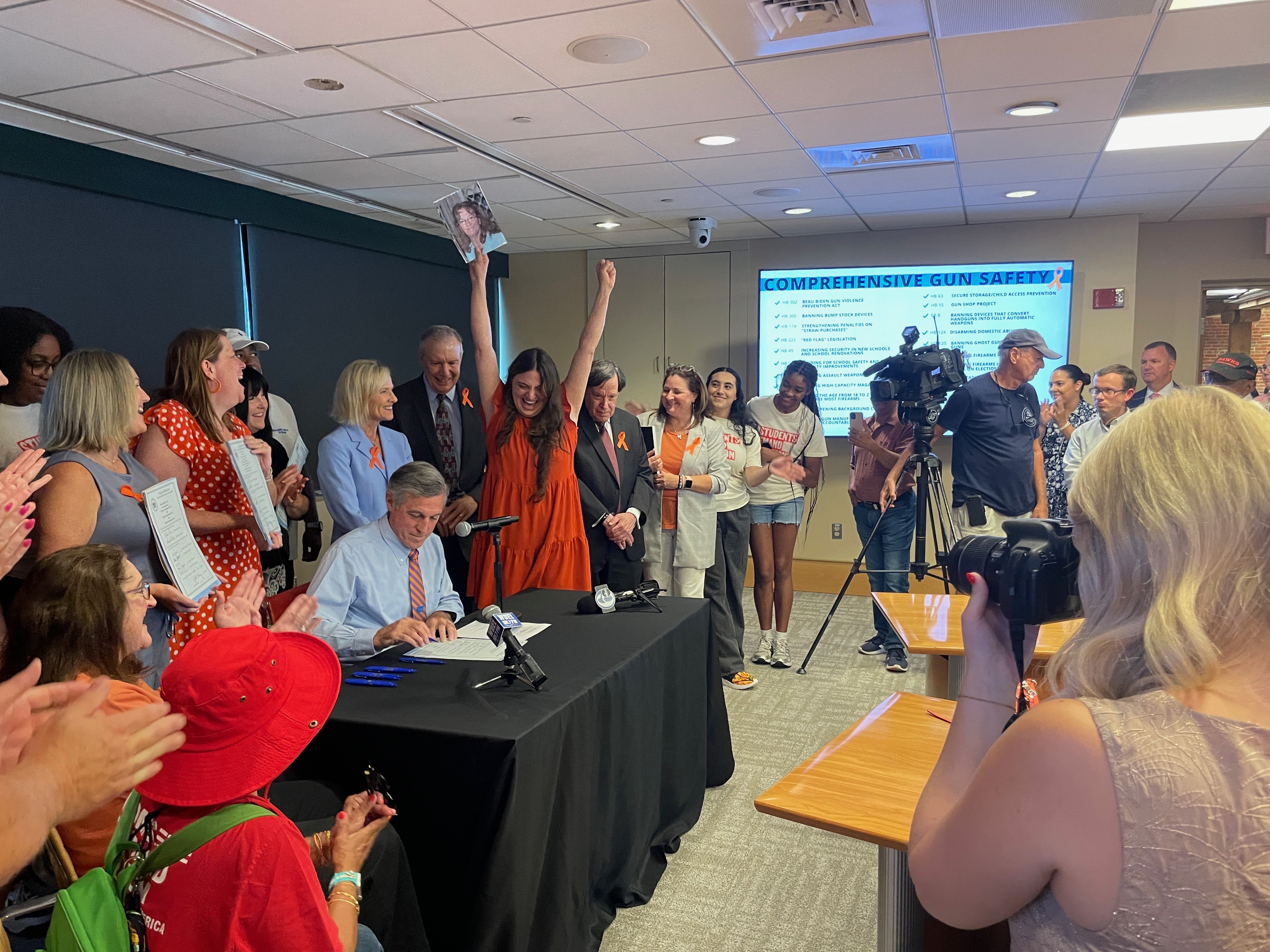
Signing of Donna's Law in Delaware, 2024

=== Delaware ===
Delaware enacted Donna's Law in 2024, becoming the fourth state to adopt the policy. The legislation received broad bipartisan support and was signed into law by Governor John Carney.

=== Colorado ===
Colorado enacted a version of Donna's Law in 2025, becoming the fifth state to adopt a voluntary firearm purchase-waiver system. The law established a process through which individuals may voluntarily waive their right to purchase firearms. While a waiver is in effect, the Colorado Bureau of Investigation is required to deny a firearm transfer to the person and to enter the waiver into the National Instant Criminal Background Check System (NICS) and other relevant federal or state databases. The law also requires the bureau to establish an online portal for filing and revoking waivers. A revocation does not take effect until 30 days after it is accepted.

=== Other states ===
Versions of Donna's Law have been introduced or studied in numerous states:

- Florida: Legislators considered related measures through Senate Bill 199 (2020), titled the Firearm Purchase Self-Control Act.
- Louisiana: Proposals sponsored in honor of Donna Nathan have been introduced in Louisiana, but efforts to enact such legislation have not succeeded.
- Maine: Representative Vicki Doudera introduced legislation in 2024 to allow residents to waive their gun rights. The measure was subsequently converted into a study bill creating a bipartisan 13-member task force to study the logistical implementation of a voluntary registry through court clerks and state police.
- Maryland: Lawmakers held hearings on Donna's Law legislation in 2023 and 2024.
- New York: In June 2024, the New York State Senate passed Senate Bill S2086A, sponsored by Senator Brian Kavanagh, which sought to establish a voluntary firearm-waiver system integrated with NICS.
- Tennessee: Tennessee lawmakers introduced several versions of the Tennessee Voluntary Do Not Sell Firearms Act in 2024. Senate Bill 1746, sponsored by Senator Heidi Campbell, proposed allowing residents to voluntarily waive their firearm rights by filing a waiver with a court clerk or healthcare provider. Senate Bill 2259, sponsored by Campbell and Republican Senator Art Swann, also proposed creating a Tennessee Voluntary Do Not Sell Firearms Act and provided procedures for filing and revoking voluntary firearm-rights waivers.
- Georgia: In 2024, state lawmakers introduced Senate Bill 522 and subsequently Senate Bill 224, both titled "Donna's Law." The proposed legislation sought to establish a voluntary "do not sell" list for firearms and provide procedures for self-enrollment and removal.
- Missouri: The Missouri Policy Initiative published a science note evaluating the potential impact of a voluntary do-not-sell firearms policy in Missouri, including its potential effects on firearm suicide rates.

=== Federal legislation ===
In 2022, Representatives Pramila Jayapal and John Curtis introduced the bipartisan Preventing Suicide Through Voluntary Firearm Purchase Delay Act. The bill, H.R. 8361, would have established a national voluntary firearm-purchase-delay system through which individuals could request that their names be entered into a database used to delay firearm purchases. The House Judiciary Committee held a full-committee markup of the bill on December 7, 2022. The bill did not become law.

== Rationale ==
Supporters of Donna's Law argue that restricting immediate access to firearms can reduce suicide deaths because firearms have a significantly higher fatality rate than other suicide methods. They describe the law as an "advance directive" that allows individuals to make decisions about firearm access during periods of mental wellness rather than during a crisis. Advocates have emphasized that the law does not confiscate firearms or impose restrictions on unwilling individuals. Instead, it provides a voluntary mechanism for people who believe they may be at risk of harming themselves in the future.

Opponents of voluntary do-not-sell-list legislation have raised concerns about its effectiveness, implementation, and effect on firearm rights. The MOST Policy Initiative reported in 2024 that there were no studies evaluating Donna's Law's effect on suicide rates and that the number of people enrolled in the registries in Washington, Utah, and Virginia was relatively small. It also noted that because the registries are maintained at the state level, a person's enrollment generally does not appear on a background check conducted in another state, and that purchases from sources not subject to background checks may not be prevented by the registry. Consequently, the effectiveness of the laws may depend on both participation and the scope of firearm transactions covered by the applicable background-check system.

The National Rifle Association's Institute for Legislative Action (NRA-ILA) has opposed voluntary do-not-sell-list proposals, arguing that they raise constitutional, procedural, and privacy concerns. The organization has also argued that some such laws can make removal from the registry difficult, potentially resulting in an individual's firearms-purchasing rights being suspended for an extended or indefinite period. These criticisms have been raised in opposition to specific state proposals and may not apply uniformly to all versions of Donna's Law.

== Reception ==
Donna's Law has received support from suicide-prevention organizations, mental health advocates, and gun violence prevention groups. Commentators have noted that it is one of the few firearm policy proposals to attract bipartisan support in multiple states. Critics have raised concerns regarding privacy, administrative implementation, and the possibility of future misuse of voluntary enrollment data. Debate has also focused on how easily individuals should be able to remove themselves from the registry and whether adequate procedural safeguards exist.

== Endorsements and sponsors ==
Versions of Donna's Law have received support from firearm-suicide-prevention advocates, mental-health organizations, and gun-safety groups. The legislation has been promoted by the American Foundation for Suicide Prevention (AFSP), American Bar Association, and Everytown for Gun Safety supported enactment efforts in Colorado. State-level versions of Donna's Law have attracted bipartisan sponsorship, including by Representative Steve Eliason in Utah, Delegate Eric Morrison in Delaware, Senator Cathy Kipp and Representative Andrew Boesenecker in Colorado, Senator Scott Surovell in Virginia, and Senator Jamie Pedersen in Washington.

== Usage ==
By October 2024, a survey of states that had implemented Donna's Law found that 132 individuals had voluntarily enrolled in firearm self-exclusion programs, while 13 had later removed themselves after completing required waiting periods. Researchers and advocates have argued that participation rates may increase as awareness grows and registration procedures become more accessible.
