= Härnösand =

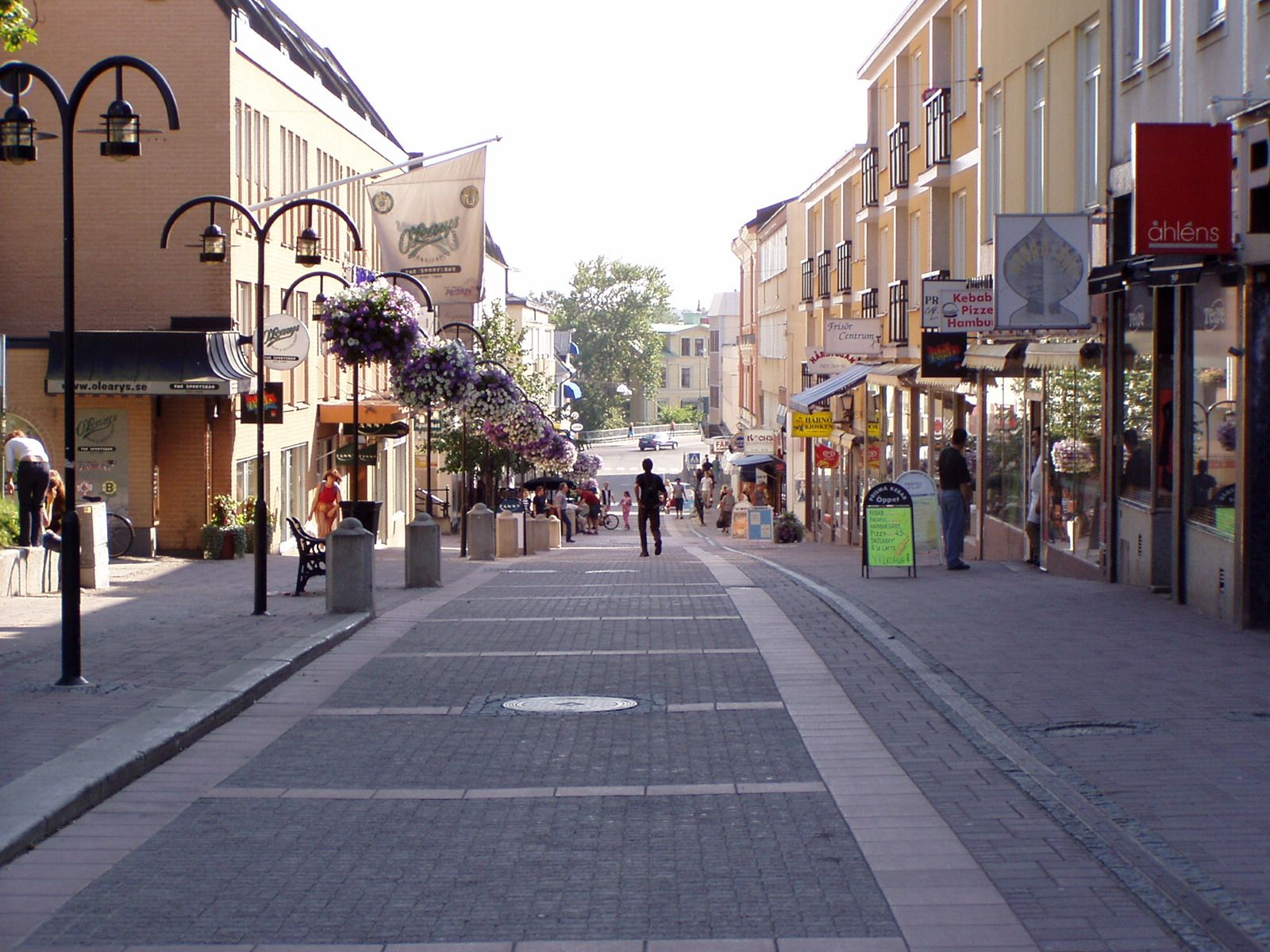
- Storgatan in Härnösand

- Location within Västernorrland Location within Sweden
- Coordinates: 62°38′10″N 17°56′28″E
- Country: Sweden
- Province: Ångermanland
- County: Västernorrland County
- Municipality: Härnösand Municipality

Area
  - City: 10.89 km^{2} (4.20 sq mi)
  - Metro: 1,064.50 km^{2} (411.01 sq mi)
- Elevation: 1 m (3.3 ft)

Population (1 January, 2023)
  - City: 25,012
  - Density: 1,611/km^{2} (4,170/sq mi)
  - Metro: 24,922
- Time zone: UTC+1 (CET)
  - Summer (DST): UTC+2 (CEST)
- Postal code: 871 xx
- Area code: (+46) 611
- Climate: Dfb
- Website: www.harnosand.se

Härnösand (Swedish pronunciation: [hæɳøˈsanːd]) is a town and locality in Västernorrland County, Sweden. It is the seat of Härnösand Municipality, with 25,012 inhabitants in 2023. It is called "the gate to the High Coast" because of the world heritage landscape just a few miles north of Härnösand. Härnösand is the seat of the Diocese of Härnösand, the County Governor residence and Västernorrland County Museum.

== History ==
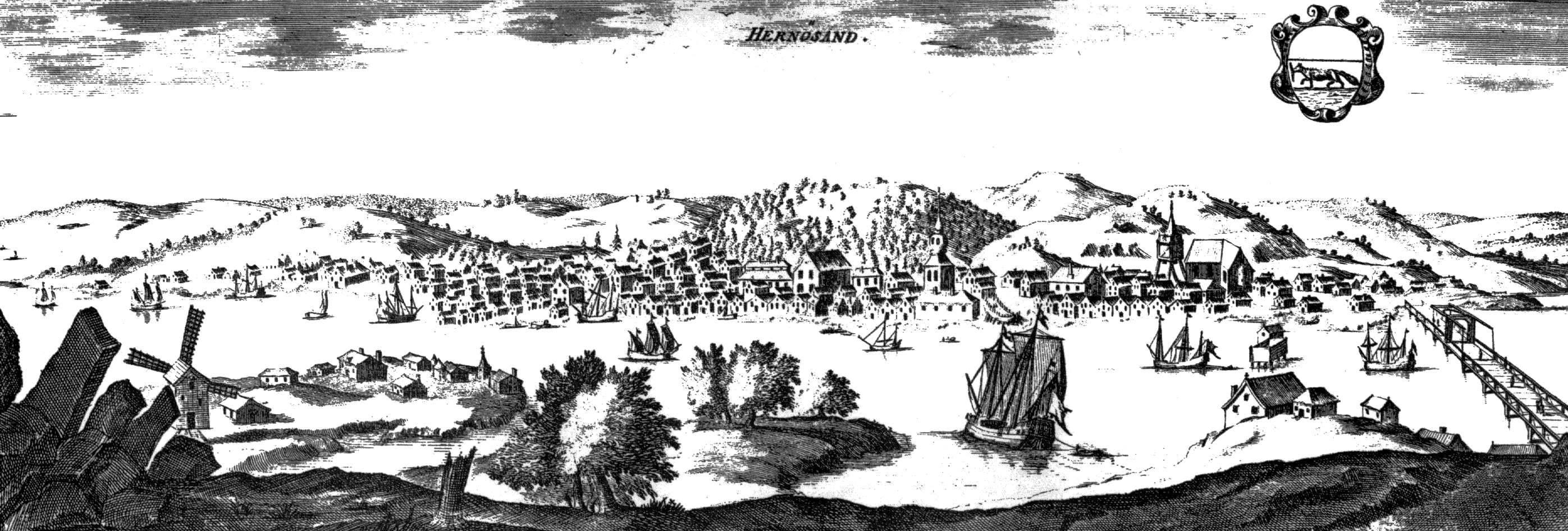
Härnösand circa 1700, from Suecia antiqua et hodierna.

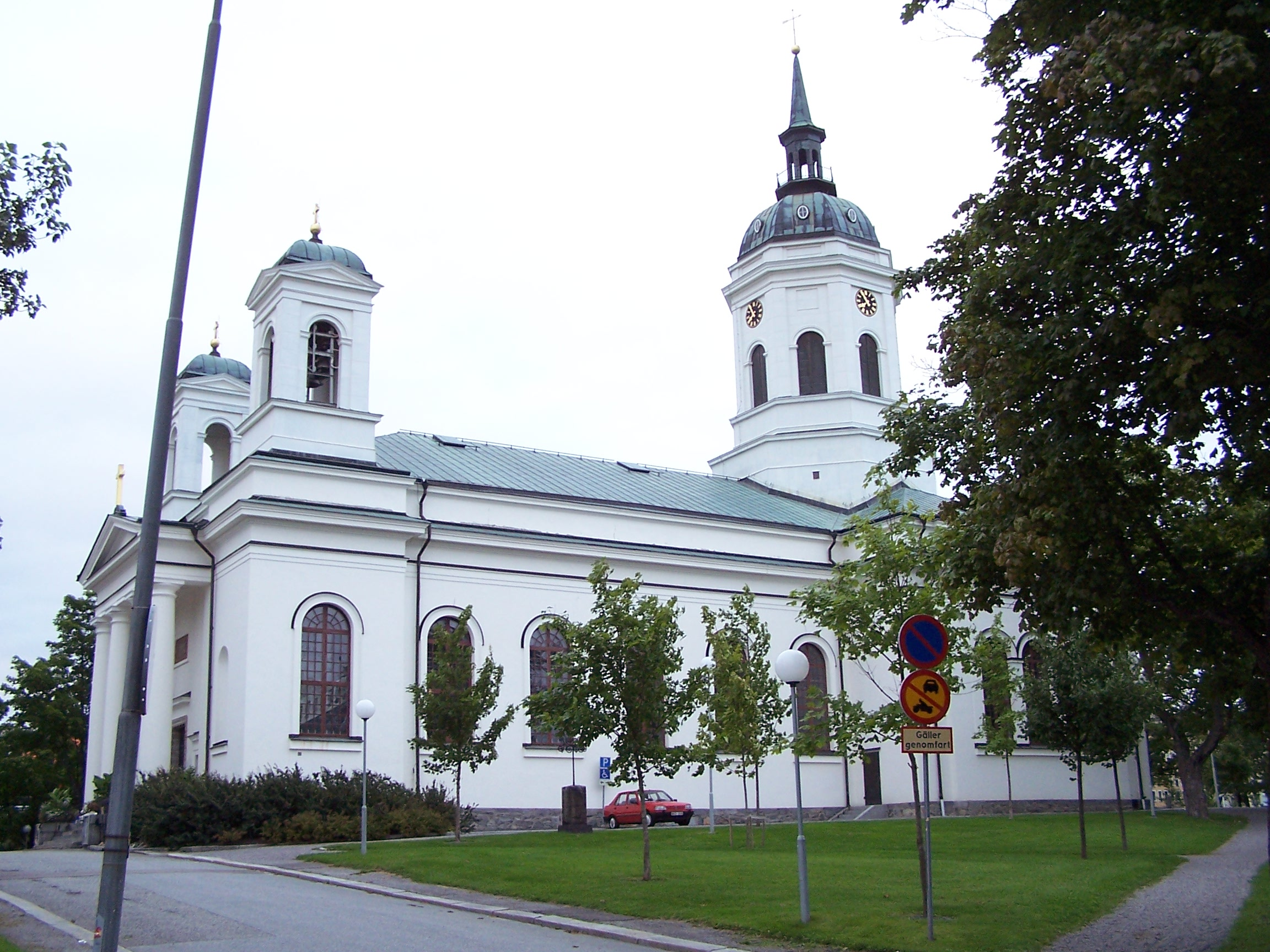
Härnösand cathedral

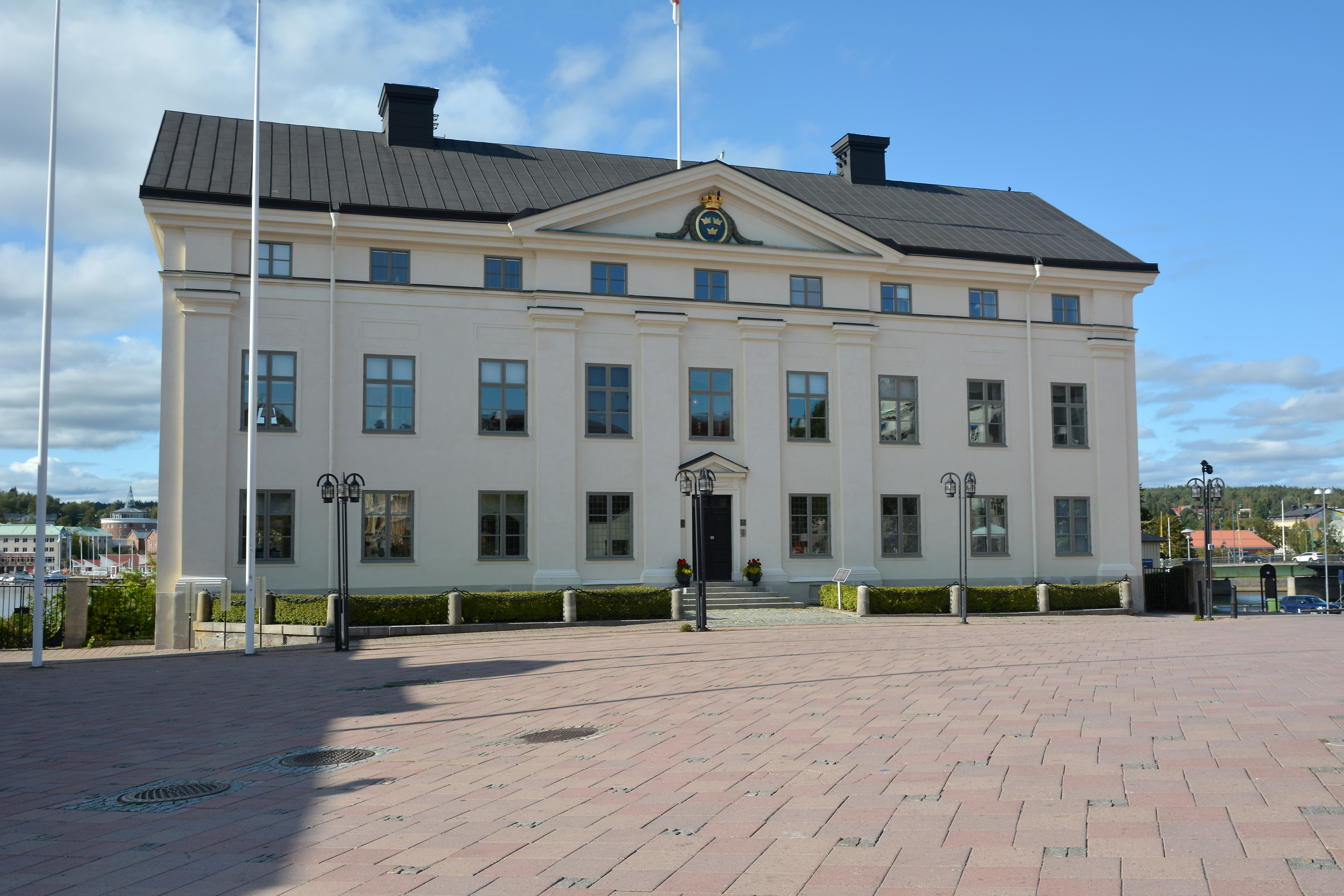
County Governor residence

On 10 December 1885, Härnösand became the first town in Sweden with electric street lighting, following the Gådeå power station being taken into use.

=== World War II ===
During World War II, owing to its strategic position as a port, the town was used to help the Nazis transport soldiers and weapons.

== Education ==
Härnösand is the seat of The National Agency for Special Needs Education and Schools (Specialpedagogiska skolmyndigheten).

The Swedish International Development Cooperation Agency (Sida) operates its training programme Sida Partnership Forum in Härnösand.

== Industry ==
One of the biggest employers in Härnösand is the cable-TV and Cable internet service provider Com Hem.

== Sports ==
The women's team of the bandy club Härnösands AIK plays in the highest division and the men's team has done.

Their handballteam plays in division 2 and is called Brännans IF.

The football club IF Älgarna plays in Division 2 Norrland.

Curling is also played in the city and Team Anette Norberg is based there. Anette Norberg won several medals in sport, including an Olympic gold medal. Sweden's only curling high school is located in the city. Established in 1989, the school has trained a number of curlers who later competed at national and international levels.

Härnösand also has an ice hockey team AIK Hockey Härnösand that plays in division 1 in region norr.

== Recreation ==
Härnösand is a fairly small town and some of the activities young people engage in are Kåken (Ungdomens Hus), a youth centre provided by the municipality. The city also has an extensive selection of outdoor activities in the summer and wintertime. Wintertime people can go skiing (cross country and downhill), ice skating, etc. Summertime activities include climbing, kayaking, trekking, etc. The town also features a summertime beach Smitingen, which occasionally gets some surfable waves. Härnösand is each summer the site of one of the world's largest airsoft events, Berget.

== Climate ==
Härnösand has a humid continental climate (Dfb) with significant maritime influence, causing mild to warm summers and cold but not severe winters that are milder than areas further north. In the Kvarken area and further north the water is less salty and freezes easier, creating colder winter climate.

Climate data for Härnösand (temperatures 2002–2018; extremes since 1901)
Month	Jan	Feb	Mar	Apr	May	Jun	Jul	Aug	Sep	Oct	Nov	Dec	Year
Record high °C (°F)	10.5 (50.9)	12.5 (54.5)	17.0 (62.6)	22.4 (72.3)	28.4 (83.1)	31.4 (88.5)	32.7 (90.9)	31.5 (88.7)	26.0 (78.8)	20.6 (69.1)	13.9 (57.0)	10.3 (50.5)	32.7 (90.9)
Mean maximum °C (°F)	5.2 (41.4)	6.6 (43.9)	11.0 (51.8)	15.6 (60.1)	21.7 (71.1)	24.7 (76.5)	26.9 (80.4)	25.1 (77.2)	20.4 (68.7)	14.1 (57.4)	9.2 (48.6)	6.7 (44.1)	27.6 (81.7)
Mean daily maximum °C (°F)	−1.6 (29.1)	−1.1 (30.0)	2.9 (37.2)	7.9 (46.2)	13.4 (56.1)	18.0 (64.4)	21.3 (70.3)	19.6 (67.3)	14.9 (58.8)	8.2 (46.8)	3.3 (37.9)	0.4 (32.7)	8.9 (48.1)
Daily mean °C (°F)	−4.9 (23.2)	−4.5 (23.9)	−1.1 (30.0)	3.6 (38.5)	8.9 (48.0)	13.5 (56.3)	17.0 (62.6)	15.5 (59.9)	11.1 (52.0)	5.0 (41.0)	0.7 (33.3)	−2.7 (27.1)	5.2 (41.3)
Mean daily minimum °C (°F)	−8.1 (17.4)	−7.9 (17.8)	−5.0 (23.0)	−0.7 (30.7)	4.3 (39.7)	8.9 (48.0)	12.6 (54.7)	11.4 (52.5)	7.2 (45.0)	1.7 (35.1)	−2.0 (28.4)	−5.7 (21.7)	1.4 (34.5)
Mean minimum °C (°F)	−20.2 (−4.4)	−19.2 (−2.6)	−15.7 (3.7)	−6.9 (19.6)	−2.0 (28.4)	3.6 (38.5)	7.1 (44.8)	5.7 (42.3)	0.6 (33.1)	−6.4 (20.5)	−10.7 (12.7)	−15.8 (3.6)	−23.4 (−10.1)
Record low °C (°F)	−32.5 (−26.5)	−33.2 (−27.8)	−31.0 (−23.8)	−18.0 (−0.4)	−6.5 (20.3)	−2.7 (27.1)	3.0 (37.4)	0.2 (32.4)	−5.8 (21.6)	−16.0 (3.2)	−21.5 (−6.7)	−34.7 (−30.5)	−34.7 (−30.5)
Average precipitation mm (inches)	69.8 (2.75)	42.4 (1.67)	35.0 (1.38)	33.7 (1.33)	45.3 (1.78)	42.5 (1.67)	69.8 (2.75)	92.5 (3.64)	62.3 (2.45)	77.8 (3.06)	75.8 (2.98)	74.3 (2.93)	721.2 (28.39)
Source 1: SMHI Open Data
Source 2: SMHI climate data 2002–2018

== Notable people ==
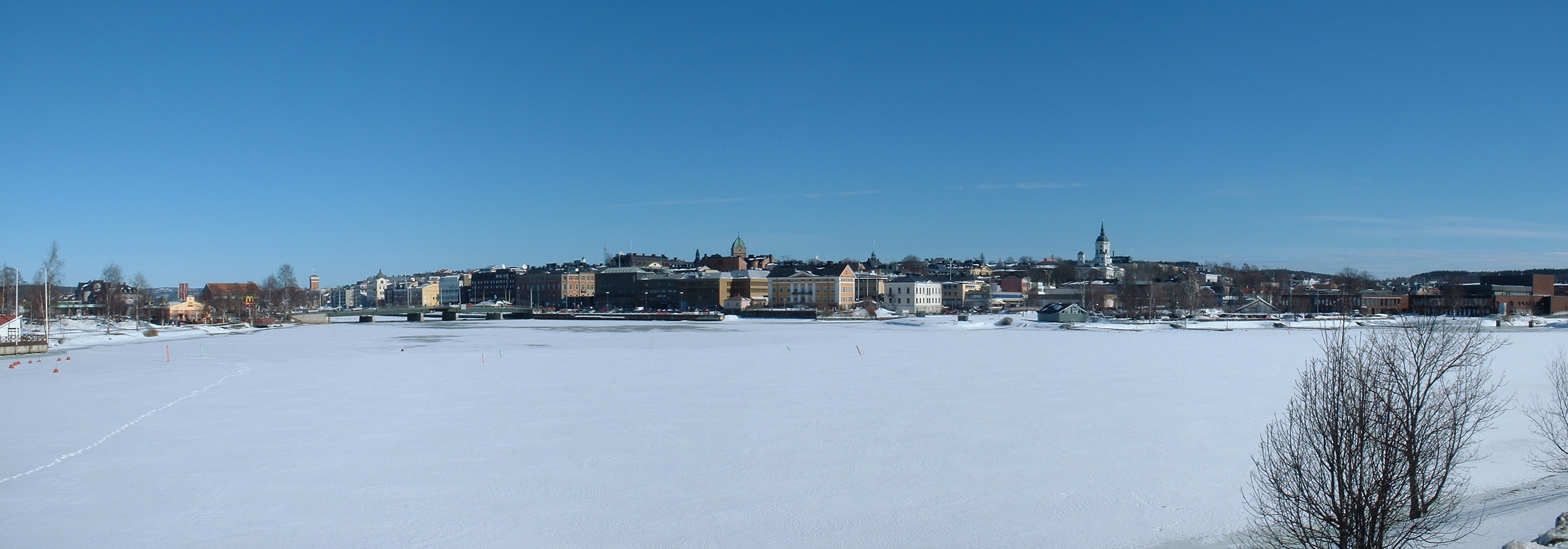
Panorama of Härnösand, March 2005.

- Alfhild Agrell, writer and playwright
- Anders Jonas Ångström, physicist
- Albert Atterberg, soil mechanics
- Dagmar Beling (1929–2023), painter
- Nils Bohlin, inventor
- Lena Endre, Actor
- Tomas Fischer, book publisher and businessman
- Anton Forsberg, ice hockey goaltender for the Ottawa Senators
- Bo Holmberg, politician
- Lasse Lindh, Musician
- Johan Lundgren, businessman
- Bertil Malmberg, writer
- Anette Norberg, women's curling Olympic gold medalist
- Carl Gustaf Nordin, statesman
- Ulf Sandström, ice hockey player
- Monica Sjöö, (December 31, 1938 – August 8, 2005), painter, writer and a radical anarcho/ eco-feminist and an exponent of the Goddess movement.
- Frideborg Winblad, educator and administrator
