= Pitot =

Pitot is a surname. Notable people with the surname include:

- Henri Pitot (1695–1771), French hydraulic engineer and the inventor of the Pitot tube
- James Pitot (1784–1831), the second Mayor of New Orleans
- François Pitot (naval officer), Captain of the French frigate Vengeance during the Quasi-War
- François Pitot (figure skater) (born 2005), French figure skater

== See also ==
- Pitot House, a historic landmark in New Orleans
- Pitot tube, a pressure measurement instrument used to measure fluid flow velocity
