= Charles Trudeau (politician) =

American politician (1743–1816)

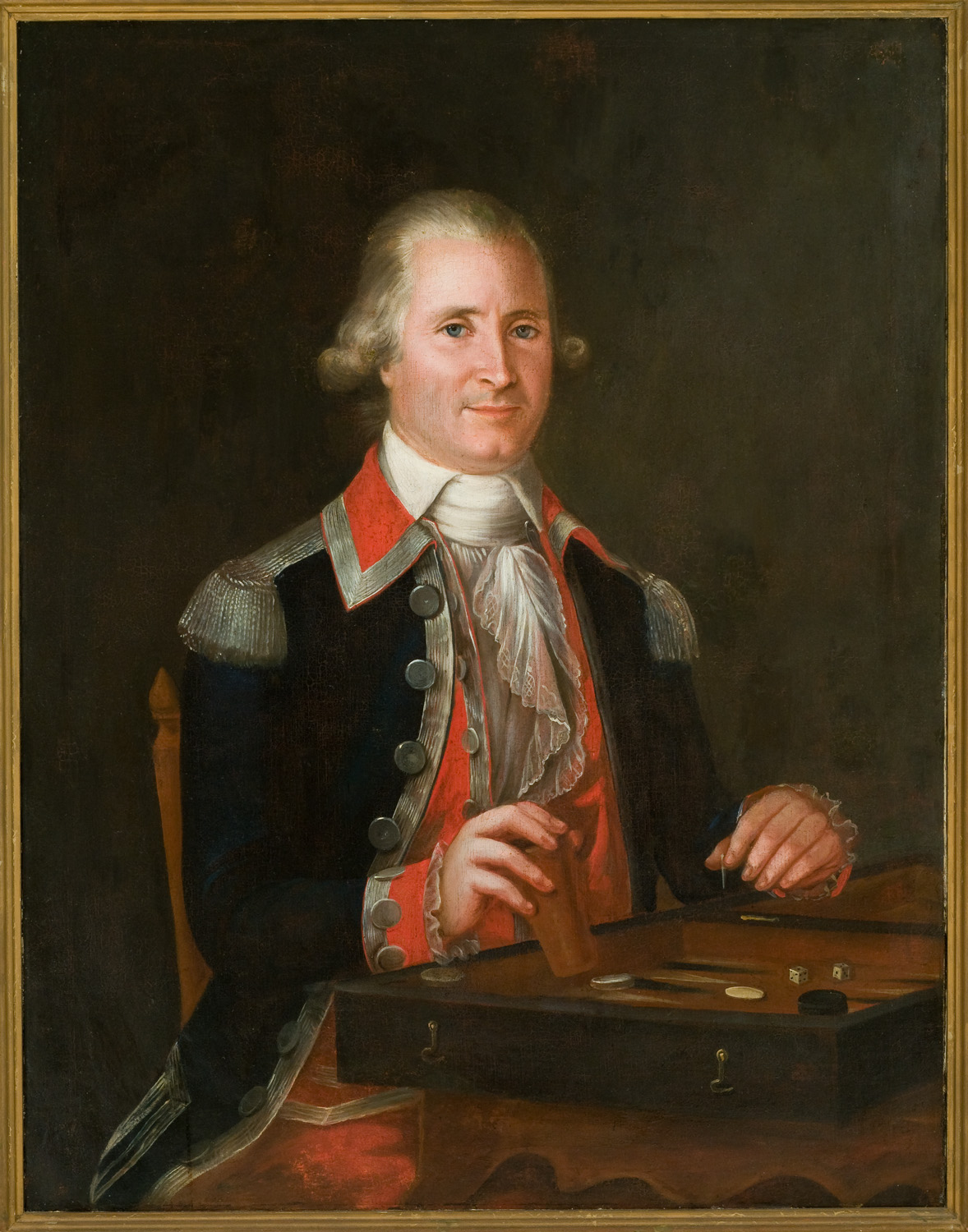
Trudeau depicted in a circa 1746-1816 portrait by José Francisco Xavier de Salazar y Mendoza, now housed at the Newcomb Art Museum

Charles Laveau Trudeau (1743–1816) also known as Charles Trudeau dit Laveau or Don Carlos Trudeau or Don Carlos Trudeau Laveau, served as the acting mayor of New Orleans in 1812 (May 23 – Oct. 8). His name includes a French honorific, dit Laveau (i.e. "called" Laveau), a tradition often used to carry forward the name of a revered woman in the family; in this case Charles's paternal great-great-grandmother, Marie Catherine de Lavaux (1621, Nancy, Meurthe-et-Moselle, France – 1688, Montreal, Québec, Canada).

Charles Laveau Trudeau was the surveyor general of Spanish Louisiana from the early 1780s until he resigned in 1805 in the U.S. Territory of Orleans period, or about 20 years. His name on maps and grants is recorded as Don Carlos Trudeau. A few years later, he served as recorder, and as president, of the city council. During his tenure as recorder, James Mather resigned and Trudeau became interim mayor.

Trudeau was born in New Orleans during the French regime to Jean-Baptiste Trudeau and Marianne Carrière. He married Charlotte Perrault (or Peyraud). The couple's children were: Caroline, who married Thomas Urquhart; Celestine, who became the second wife of General James Wilkinson; Josephine, who married Manuel Andry, Jr.; and Manette, who married Dr. Josias Eliot Kerr. He is also the supposed biological grandfather of Marie Laveau, whose mother was Marguerite D'Arcantel (a.k.a. Marguerite Toussainte d'Arcantel Henry), a free woman of color.

== See also ==
- Lafayette Square (New Orleans), established by Charles Trudeau
- Zénon Trudeau (1748–1813), his brother

Preceded by James Mather	Mayor of New Orleans; May 23, 1812 – October 8, 1812	Succeeded by Nicolas Girod
