= Cavelier Petit =

American politician

Mayor of New Orleans
- Acting; May 26, 1804 – June 5, 1804
- Preceded by: Étienne de Boré
- Succeeded by: James Pitot

Deputy Mayor of New Orleans
- In office December 20, 1803 – May 26, 1804
- Preceded by: Jean Noël Destréhan and Pierre Sauvé (French Louisiana)
- Succeeded by: Position abolished

Cavelier Petit was an American politician who served as acting mayor of New Orleans from May 26, 1804 to June 5, 1804. Petit was described by writer Alcée Fortier as being "prominent in the affairs of the colony about the time it passed into the hands of the United States".

== Career ==
Following the Louisiana Purchase in 1803 and the appointment of Étienne de Boré as the first Mayor of New Orleans, Petit became a member of the New Orleans City Council led by Boré. He also served as the "adjoint" or deputy mayor of New Orleans from December 20, 1803 to May 26, 1804, a position previous held by Jean Noël Destréhan and Pierre Sauvé during French transitional rule.

On May 26, 1804, Boré resigned stating his private affairs needed his full attention and was succeeded by Petit as acting mayor. The council responded to Boré's retirement with regret and adopted resolutions expressing that the position be filled by a man "equally as able and patriotic". The council endorsed one of its members James Pitot for the position and on June 6, 1804, Pitot was appointed as mayor by governor William C. C. Claiborne.

Petit would remain as a member of the council and, in late 1804, he was on a committee with Evan Jones, Edward Livingston and James Pitot to draft a petition to the 8th United States Congress against the establishment of the Territory of Orleans. He attended his last council meeting on March 6, 1805, after which he retired to private life.

== Personal life ==
Petit was an inhabitant of Louisiana and a member of a Creole family.

== Sources ==
- Arthur, Stanley Clisby; Huchet de Kernion, George Campbell (2009) [1931]. Old Families of Louisiana. Clearfield.
- Fortier, Alcée (1914). Louisiana: Comprising Sketches of Parishes, Towns, Events, Institutions, and Persons, Arranged in Cyclopedic Form, Volume 2. Century historical association. Archived from the original on January 28, 2024.
- Kendall, John Smith (1922). History of New Orleans. Lewis Publishing Company.

Political offices
Preceded by Étienne de Boré	Mayor of New Orleans; May 26, 1804 – June 5, 1804	Succeeded by James Pitot
