= Dagmar Beling =

Swedish painter (1929–2023)

Dagmar Elisabet Beling (19 December 1929 – 17 January 2023) was a Swedish painter, school teacher and art historian. Inspired by summers in Sweden and trips across Europe with her husband, she painted in acrylics, gouache and oils. Her works include landscapes, portraits, still lifes and interiors. In 1980, she completed a large wall painting depicting Riddarholmen at Kärrtorp's High School in southern Stockholm. On a journalist's initiative, in 2017 she and the students who had helped her were reunited beside the painting. In addition to her paintings, she is remembered for her biography of the Swedish sculptor Brita Hörlin.

== Early life and education ==
Born in Härnösand on 19 December 1929, Dagmar Elisabet Beling studied at Konstfack (1954–1957) and Högre Konstindustriella Skolan (1957). She graduated in art and literature at Stockholm University. In 1970, she studied mosaics at the CISIM centre in Ravenna. She made study trips to Italy, Spain, Greece and Lofoten in Norway.

== Career ==
Drawing inspiration from the study trips she made with her husband, the lawyer Sven Beling, she painted landscapes, portraits, interiors and still lifes in acrylics, gouache or oils. Subjects included the Stockholm Archipelago, especially around Utö. The couple spent their summers in a log cabin in Medelpad where she depicted colourful scenes of flowers, country life, the vegetation and the sea.

In addition to painting, in 1999 Beling published a book about the Swedish sculptor Brita Hörlin titled Brita Hörlin : en konstnärsprofil (Brita Hörlin: Profile of an Artist). The two had met in Utö. The book describes Hörlin's activities, including her stucco decorations in the entrance halls of HSB houses around Stockholm.

A few years ago, the journalist Lars Epstein became interested in the large wall painting of a Stockholm scene featuring Gamla Stan and Riddarholmen in the Kärrtorp High School. He discovered it had been painted by Beling back in 1980. On his initiative, in 2017 Beling and the students who had helped her while she worked there as a teacher were reunited beside the picture.

Beling was represented by entities including the Stockholm Regional Council, Stockholm Municipality and the National Swedish Arts Council. Her works have been widely exhibited in Sweden.

Dagmar Beling died in Stockholm on 17 January 2023, aged 93.
