= James Mather (politician) =

American politician

4th Mayor of New Orleans
- In office 1807–1812
- Preceded by: John Watkins
- Succeeded by: Charles Trudeau

Personal details
- Born: 1750 Coupland, England
- Died: October 7, 1821 (aged 70–71) Lutcher, Louisiana
- Spouse: Frances Mather
- Children: 5

James Mather (c. 1750 – October 7, 1821) was mayor of New Orleans from March 9, 1807 to May 23, 1812, at which time he resigned. Mather's five-year administration overlapped, by a few weeks, the transition from the United States' Territory of Orleans period to the State of Louisiana's antebellum period, with New Orleans serving as the first state capital.

His place of birth is variously given as Coupland in Northumberland; or London. A merchant by trade, he moved to America in 1776, and by 1780 he was working in New Orleans, contracting with the Spanish Government to operate two vessels out of the port and importing articles required in the trade with the native peoples of Louisiana (New Spain) and West Florida.

Mather and his descendants owned a large sugar plantation in Lutcher, Louisiana, until 1879.

He was appointed mayor of New Orleans by William C.C. Claiborne, the territorial governor. Almost as soon as became mayor, he was obliged to take measures to defend the city against the possibility of a conspiracy by the friends of Aaron Burr, which, however, did not eventuate. In November 1809, through similar measures, he is credited with suppressing an uprising of the black population.

Mather attempted to establish a viable police force for the city, but failed. He succeeded, however, in creating a tolerably efficient fire department.

The last years of his administration saw him under fire for being under the influence of certain individuals, for failing to protect the city's interests by vetoing the resolutions of the city council, and for hiring people to write anonymous letters attacking his enemies and paying them with public funds: whether any of this was true has proved impossible to determine. In 1812, however, his health was infirm, and he resigned.

James Mather retired to his son's property on the "Acadian Coast" along the Mississippi River, where he died in 1821.

Preceded by John Watkins	Mayor of New Orleans; March 9, 1807 – May 23, 1812	Succeeded by Charles Trudeau
