= Audubon Park (New Orleans) =

City park in New Orleans

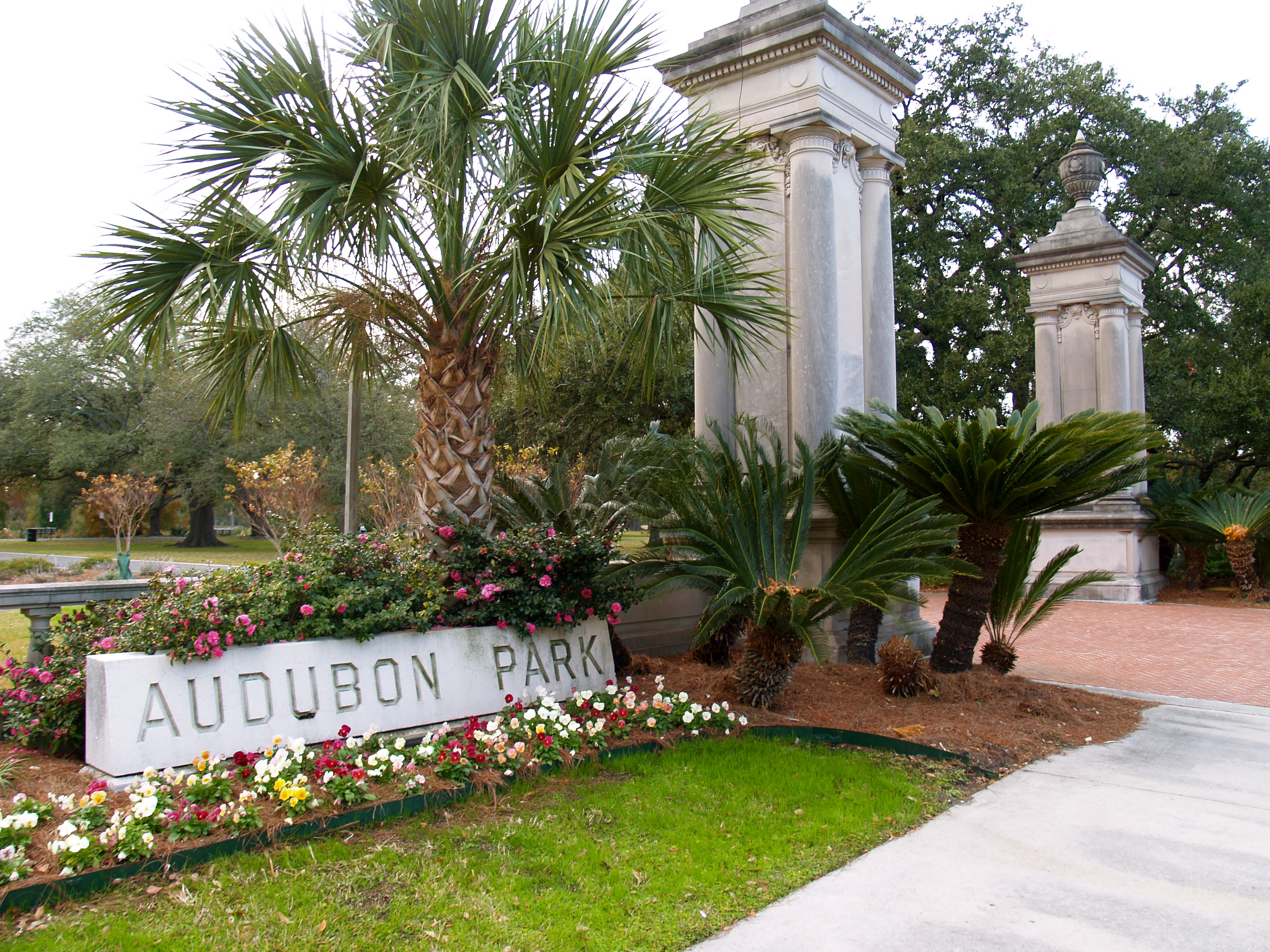
- Audubon Park entrance located on St. Charles Avenue
- Interactive map of Audubon Park
- Type: Urban park
- Location: New Orleans, Louisiana
- Coordinates: 29°56′03″N 90°07′25″W
- Area: 350 acres (1.4 km^{2})
- Created: 1871
- Owner: City of New Orleans
- Operator: Audubon Nature Institute
- Status: Open all year

Audubon Park (historically French: Plantation de Boré) is a municipal park located in the Uptown neighborhood of New Orleans, Louisiana, in the United States. It is approximately 350 acres. The park is approximately six miles to the west of the city center of New Orleans and sits on land that was purchased by the city in 1871. It is bordered on one side by the Mississippi River and on the other by St. Charles Avenue, directly across from Loyola University and Tulane University. The park is named in honor of artist and naturalist John James Audubon, who began living in New Orleans in 1821.

== History ==
=== Early history ===
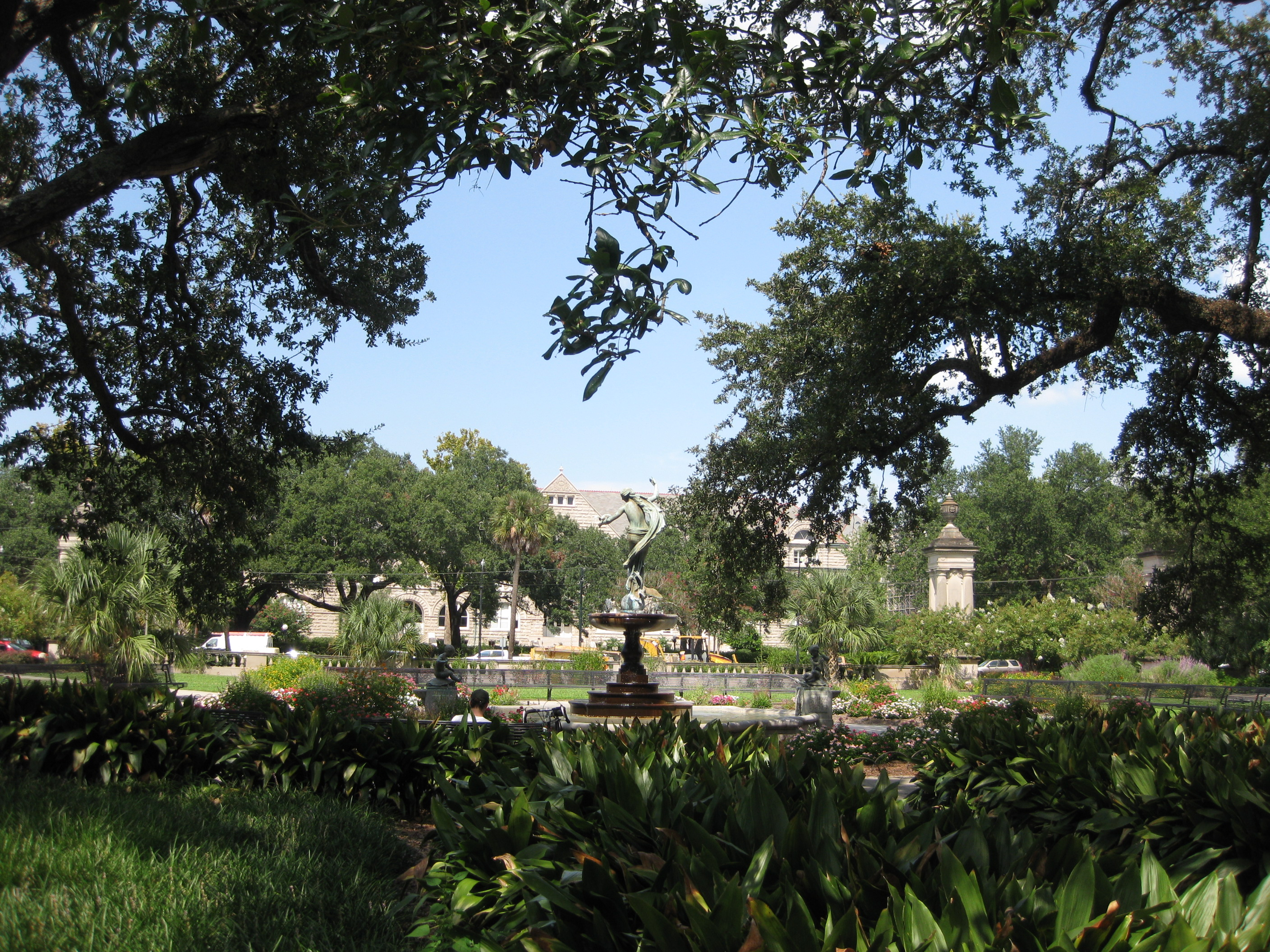
One of the fountains at Audubon Park with Tulane University in the background.

The land now housing the park was part of a pair of plantations during the late eighteenth and early nineteenth centuries: the downstream Étienne de Boré Plantation and the upstream Pierre Foucher Plantation. By 1825, the Foucher family had expanded their holdings to include all the land now part of Audubon Park. In 1832 the land passed to Louis Frederic Foucher, who abandoned the property and moved to France.

It was used by both the Confederate and the Union armies in the American Civil War, and as a staging area for the Buffalo Soldiers. The area was annexed by the City of New Orleans, along with the surrounding communities of Jefferson City and Greenville in 1870.

In 1871, Foucher's widow sold it to two real estate developers, Bloomer and Southworth. They sold the portion of the land on the river side of St. Charles Street to the city for use as a park while claiming that adjoining land could be used for a new state capitol, and then instead sold the remainder to other investors, the park having increased its value.

=== Urban park ===
At the time of its establishment, it was the last large undeveloped parcel of what was to become uptown New Orleans. Use as an urban park was intended from the start, with "Upper City Park" originally selected as a name to distinguish the park from City Park, but few improvements occurred in the first decade.

The nascent park accommodated a World's Fair soon thereafter, the World Cotton Centennial of 1884. After the closing of the fair, the park's development began in earnest. Most of the fair's buildings were demolished, with the exception of Horticultural Hall, which remained in the park until destroyed in the 1915 New Orleans hurricane. The only notable reminder of the fair to remain in the park in the 21st century is a large iron ore rock from the Alabama State exhibit (which in local lore has often been misidentified as a meteorite). Audubon Park's present form largely follows a design drafted by John Charles Olmsted, a principal of the renowned Olmsted Brothers landscape architecture practice.

Early in the 20th century, part of the park became home to the Audubon Zoo. The zoo received significant improvement at the hands of the Works Progress Administration, and again from the 1970s onwards. Numerous early- and mid-20th century park attractions like the miniature railway, the enormous Whitney Young public swimming pool, the swan boats in the lagoons, and the carousel were closed, dismantled and/or discontinued in the 1970s, though a far smaller public pool was constructed in the 1990s adjacent to the site of the original Young pool.

The ring road around the park was closed to automobile traffic at the start of the 1980s and became a popular 1.7-mile (2.7 km) walking, jogging and biking route. A 2.2 mile dirt path located around the perimeter of the park is also popular for runners seeking a less congested route.

A few of the park's old live oak trees were blown down when Hurricane Katrina hit the city in 2005, but as the park is wholly located on high ground comprising the Mississippi River's natural levee, it was spared the flooding experienced by the majority of the city after Katrina. Audubon Park was used as a makeshift helicopter port and encampment for National Guard troops and relief workers after the storm.

== Features ==
The park features sports fields and picnic facilities along the Mississippi River, in an area called Riverview Park. This riverside portion of Audubon Park is known colloquially as "The Fly", an almost-forgotten reference to the modernist, butterfly-shaped river viewing shelter constructed in the 1960s and demolished in the 1980s in the aftermath of its severe damage one foggy morning at the hands of blundering river traffic.

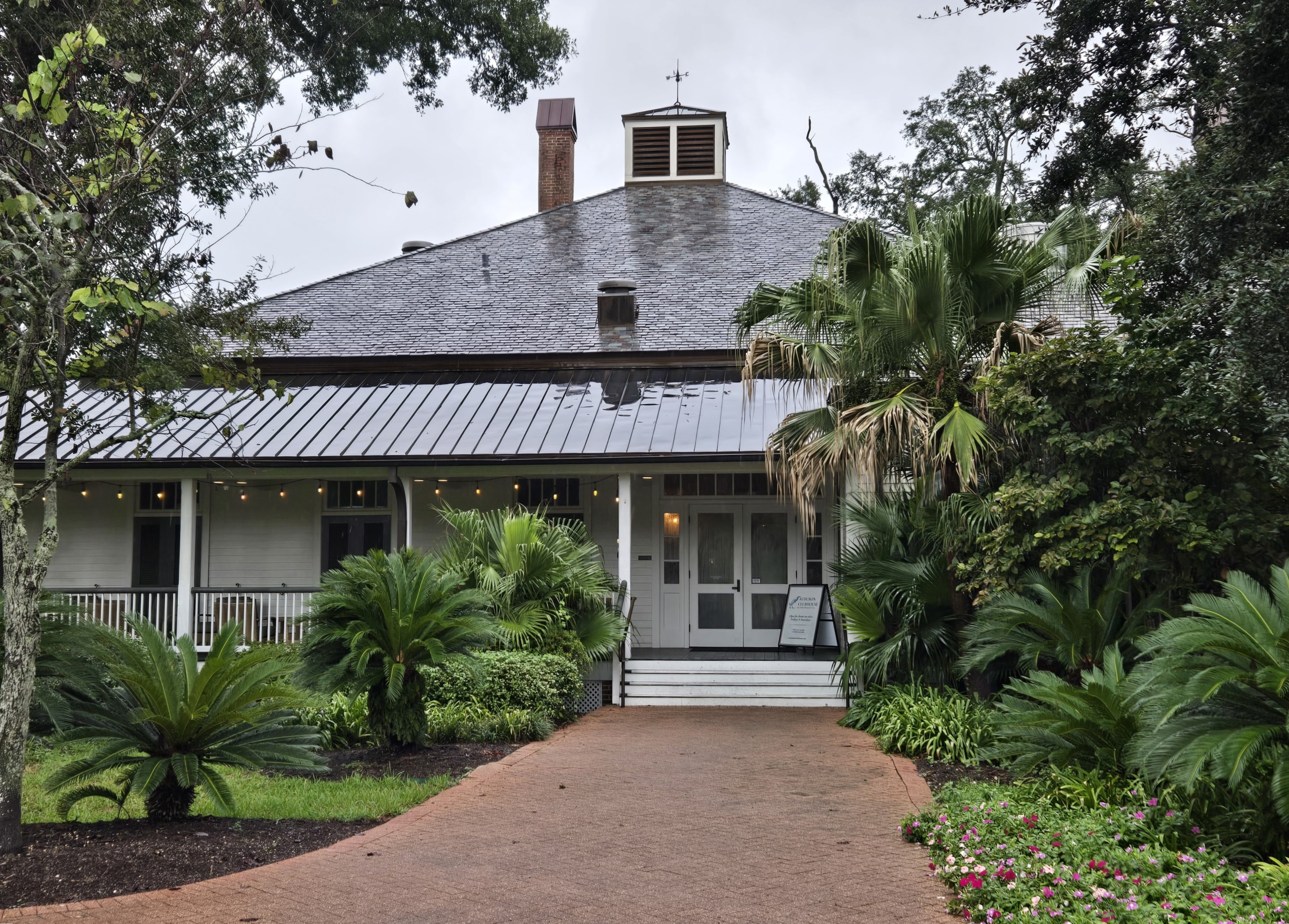
Golf Club at Audubon Park clubhouse

The Golf Club at Audubon Park, originally the Audubon golf course, opened within the park in 1898. In 2002, the golf course was renovated and converted to a mostly Par 3 executive course, to complaints from many non-golfing users of the park, who alleged that the original Olmsted Brothers design was being desecrated. The Heymann Memorial Conservatory, closed for many years prior, was demolished to accommodate the golf course renovation and new golf clubhouse.

Also in 2002, the New Orleans city council renamed the park's "Avenger Field" to "David Berger - Avenger Field" in memory of David Mark Berger, an athlete and graduate of Tulane University who was captured and killed in the 1972 Olympic Games hostage crisis. The field was officially dedicated to Berger's memory on June 10, 2013.

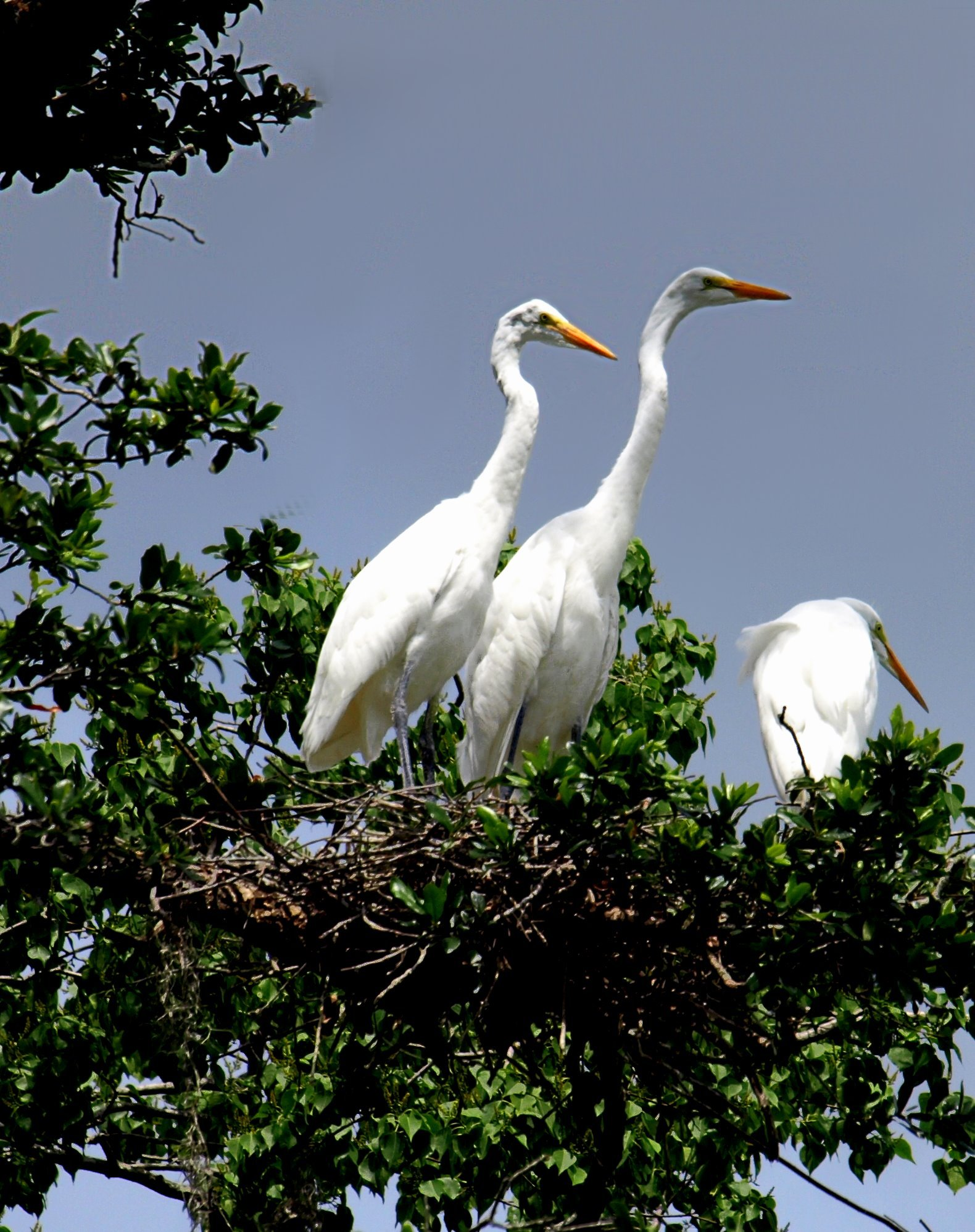
Trio of great egrets at Ochsner Island Rookery in Audubon Park.

Ochsner Island on the east side of the park features a rookery that is one of the prime birding spots in Greater New Orleans. The island attracts hundreds of wading birds, including great egrets, cattle egrets, snowy egrets, ibis, little blue herons, green herons, night herons and others. The park is also home to diving double-crested cormorants and anhingas, as well as to many species of ducks. Recently, black-bellied whistling ducks have begun using the park's lagoons as a stopover on their migrations during the winter.

The Tree of Life in the park is a popular landmark.
