= Reform Democrat =

Group within the Democratic Party in American politics

Reform Democrats
- Founded: Early 1900s
- Dissolved: 1980s
- Ideology: Progressivism; Reformism; Good government Civil service reform Anti-machine politics Anti-corruption
- Political position: Center-left to Left-wing
- National affiliation: Democratic Party

Reform Democrats in the United States are members of the Democratic Party who are opposed to the Democratic political machines of their respective cities, counties, or U.S. states, or to analogous machine politics at a national level. Reform Democrats are generally associated with the good government traditions that arose out of the progressive movement of the early 20th century, and are usually, but not always, on the left wing of the Democratic Party. The lines between anti-machine Reform Democrats and pro-machine Regular Democrats are not always clear: often, once reformers achieve office, they take advantage of patronage to establish a machine in their own right. An example of this is the rise of the "Reform machine" of Jim Brennan in the wake of his triumph over the more traditional machine of Meade Esposito in Brooklyn, New York, in the 1980s.

Reform Democrats were contrasted with machine-affiliated regular Democrats. Noted Reform Democrats included Massachusetts's Michael Dukakis, and New York's John J. B. Shea and Arnold Fein. Although the term has somewhat fallen out of use since the 1970s, it still has some currency in Greater New York area, such as the Hudson County Reform Democratic Organization in New Jersey. One of the best-known Reform Democrat clubs is the Village Independent Democrats, based in Greenwich Village, which toppled Carmine DeSapio and the might of Tammany Hall.
