= John Watkins (mayor) =

American politician

John Watkins, also shown in early records as Jean Watkins (died 1812), was an American politician who served as the fourth Mayor of New Orleans in Louisiana.

He came from a prominent family.

According to Kendall's History of Louisiana, Watkins was appointed by Territorial Governor William C. C. Claiborne to the position of the city's recorder or assessor on March 11, 1805, and sworn in that day by Mayor Pitot. Watkins acted as city council president from that date until July 27, 1805, when alderman Col. Bellechasse was elected to the presidency.

Claiborne promoted John Watkins to mayor, following the resignation of Pitot. Kendall's history, now in the public domain, has a great deal of information about events and developments in New Orleans during Watkins' administration.

Preceded by James Pitot	Mayor of New Orleans; July 27, 1805 – March 8, 1807	Succeeded by James Mather
