= Genevieve Pitot =

American musician and composer

- Born: May 20, 1901; New Orleans
- Died: October 4, 1980 (aged 79); New Orleans
- Occupations: Composer; Musician; Dancer

Genevieve Pitot (May 20, 1901 – October 4, 1980) was an American musician, composer, pianist and dancer.

== Biography ==
Pitot was born in New Orleans in 1901. One of her ancestors was James Pitot, the mayor of New Orleans. Pitot went to Paris to train as a classical pianist, studying with Alfred Cortot. She later began working in musical theatre during the 1930s, when she played for classes led by choreographer Martha Graham. Pitot was best known for both arranging and composing the music for Hanya Holm, Jerome Robbins and Michael Kidd, and Broadway musical pieces including "Kiss Me, Kate", "Shangri La" and "Li'l Abner." She composed for Helen Tamiris, Agnes de Mille, Donald Saddler.

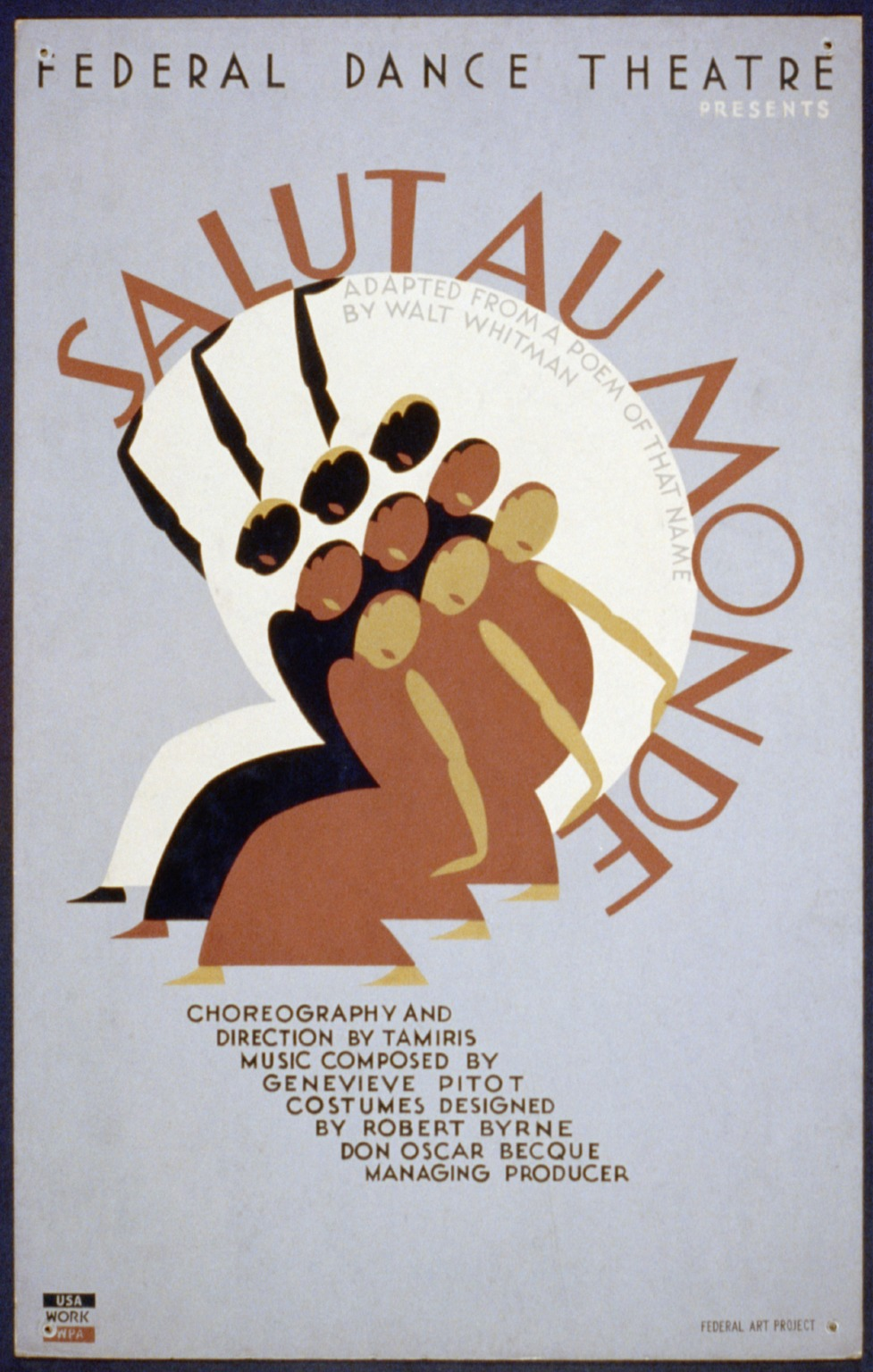
Theatre poster of a composition by Pitot

Pitot married New Yorker Joseph P. Sullivan. She died in New Orleans in 1980. Her papers are kept in Tulane University.
