= Härnösand Residence =

Residence of County Governor of Västernorrland County, Sweden

Coordinates: 62°37′55″N 17°56′14″E

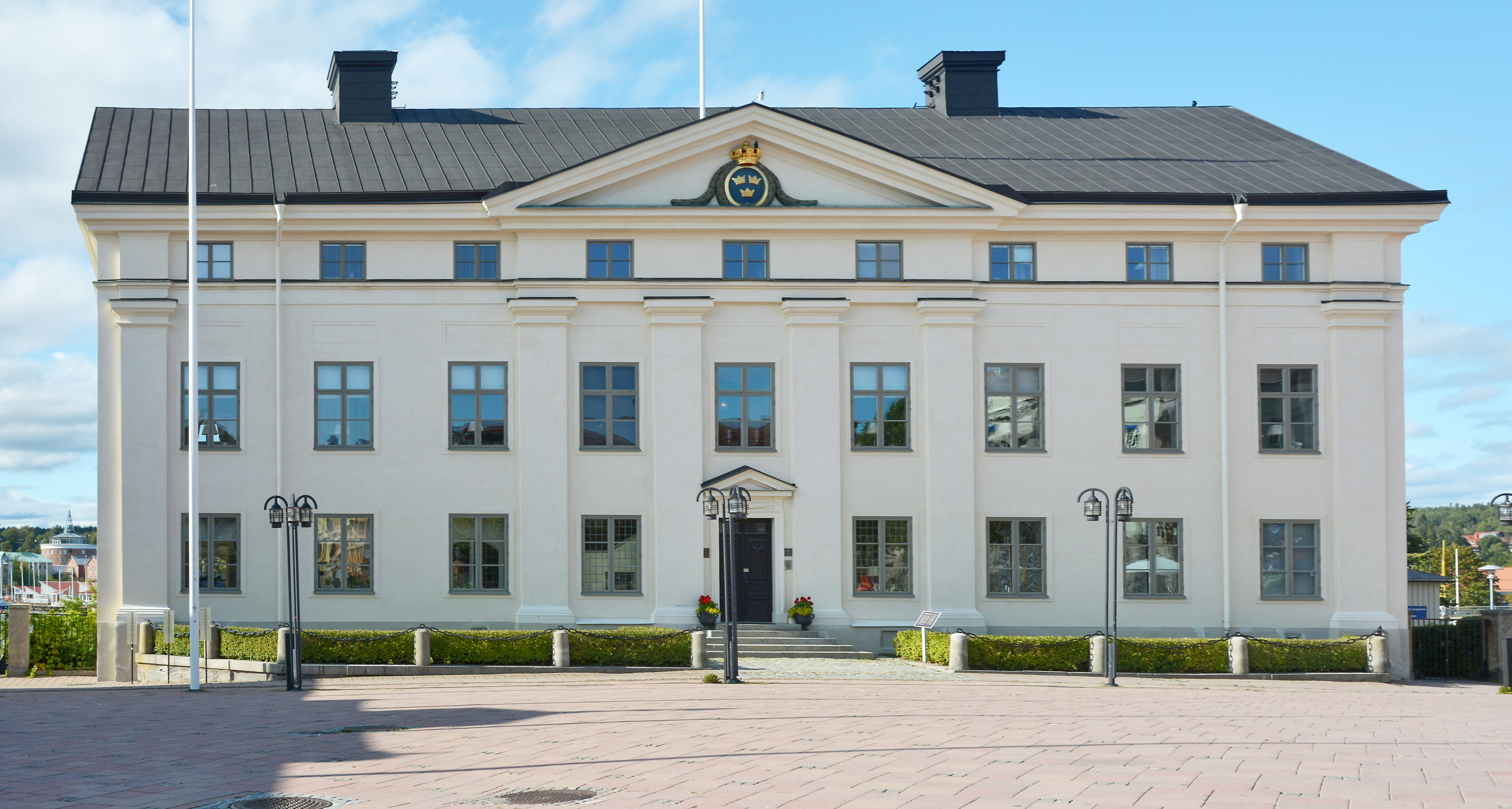
County residence of Härnösand

The county residence in Härnösand (Swedish: länsresidenset i Härnösand) is the formal residence of the county governor of Västernorrland County, Sweden. It is located in central Härnösand. The building was designed by architect Olof Tempelman and built 1785–1790. It is one of the earliest examples of Neoclassical architecture in Sweden. The sober façade with its giant order of pilasters and relative lack of decorative elements came to influence Swedish architecture far into the 19th century. The building underwent a major renovation in the 1920s.

== History ==
Härnösand became the seat of a county governor in 1646, and a simple residence was built for the governor in 1647. In 1654 however the seat of the governor moved to Sundsvall, and the residence was left to deteriorate. In 1778 the seat of the governor was moved back to Härnösand, and it fell upon the citizens to provide the governor with a suitable residence. As there were no suitable buildings available, the governor initially resided in the house of the mayor.

Unsigned blueprints (possibly by Carl Fredrik Adelcrantz) for a wooden residence building in two and a half storeys exist from 1782. The governor however, insisted the residence should be built by stone, and in 1784 designs for the current building were made by architect Olof Tempelman. Construction took from 1785 to 1790.

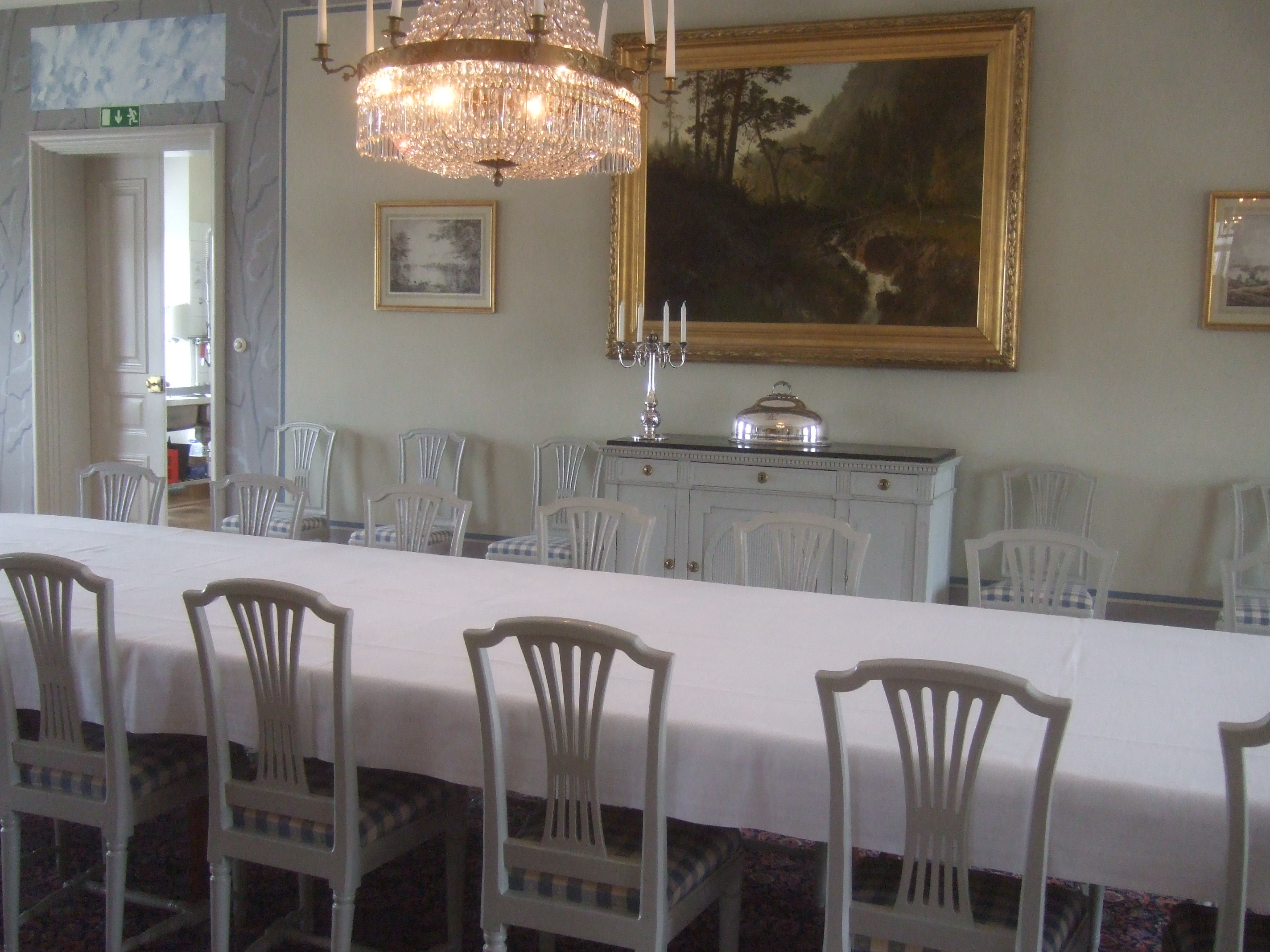
Interior: the dining room, furnished with Gustavian furniture

In 1909 the living conditions in the residence had deteriorated and were deemed to be too poor for the governor, who moved to another building in the city. Towards the late 1920s a plan for renovating the building was made and executed by architect F. Fagerström. Original details from the 1790s were preserved, but the interior layout was largely changed. New decorations were made by artist Yngve Lundström. The governor moved back to the residence in 1920. In 1955, the exterior was also renovated.

A major renovation of the interior was carried out again in 2000–2001, with the aim of restoring Lundström's work and equipping the formal rooms with coherent sets of Gustavian furniture. In 2016–2017, the exterior was also renovated.

== Architecture ==
The county residence is one of the earliest examples of Neoclassical architecture in Sweden. King Gustav III had returned from a grand tour to France and Italy in 1784, and it is apparent that the blueprints, approved by the King in January 1785, are heavily influenced by new ideals and ideas acquired during the trip. Inspiration is drawn from ancient Roman architecture and Italian Renaissance architecture, particularly Andrea Palladio, rather than from French architecture which had dominated Swedish architecture during much of the 18th century. For example, in the design for the residence Tempelman makes use of a giant order of pilasters inspired by Palladio, executed in a sharp, articulated way. The façade is also sparsely decorated, lacking festoons and other elements which had been popular earlier. The simplistic and forceful treatment of the façade came to influence Neoclassical architecture widely in Sweden, and the influence from Tempelman's residence building in Härnösand can be traced far into the 19th century in Swedish architecture.

== Sources cited ==
- Alm, Göran, ed. (1998). Signums svenska konsthistoria. [8] Den gustavianska konsten (in Swedish). Lund: Signum. pp. 90–92. ISBN 9187896362.
