= Berget =

Berget is a surname. Notable people with the name include:

== Given name ==
- Berget Lewis, Dutch singer part of the Dutch formation Ladies of Soul

== Middle name ==
- Ragna Berget Jørgensen (born 1941), Norwegian politician
- Aksel Berget Skjølsvik (born 1987), Norwegian footballer

== Surname ==
- David Berget (born 1988), Norwegian film director and screenwriter
- Jo Inge Berget (born 1990). Norwegian footballer
- Stian Berget (born 1977), Norwegian footballer
