= Tree of Life (Louisiana) =

Tree in Louisiana

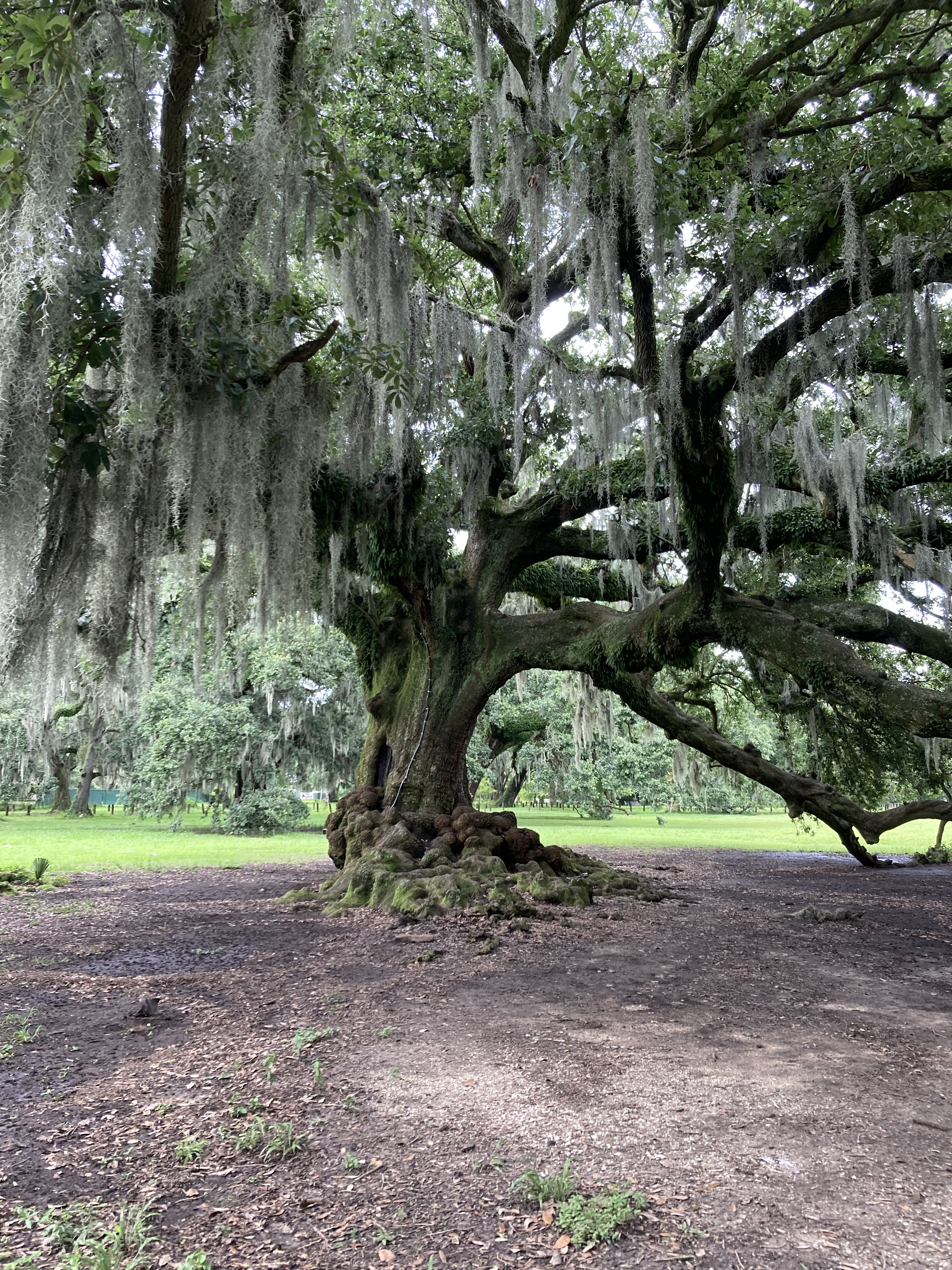
- The tree in 2021

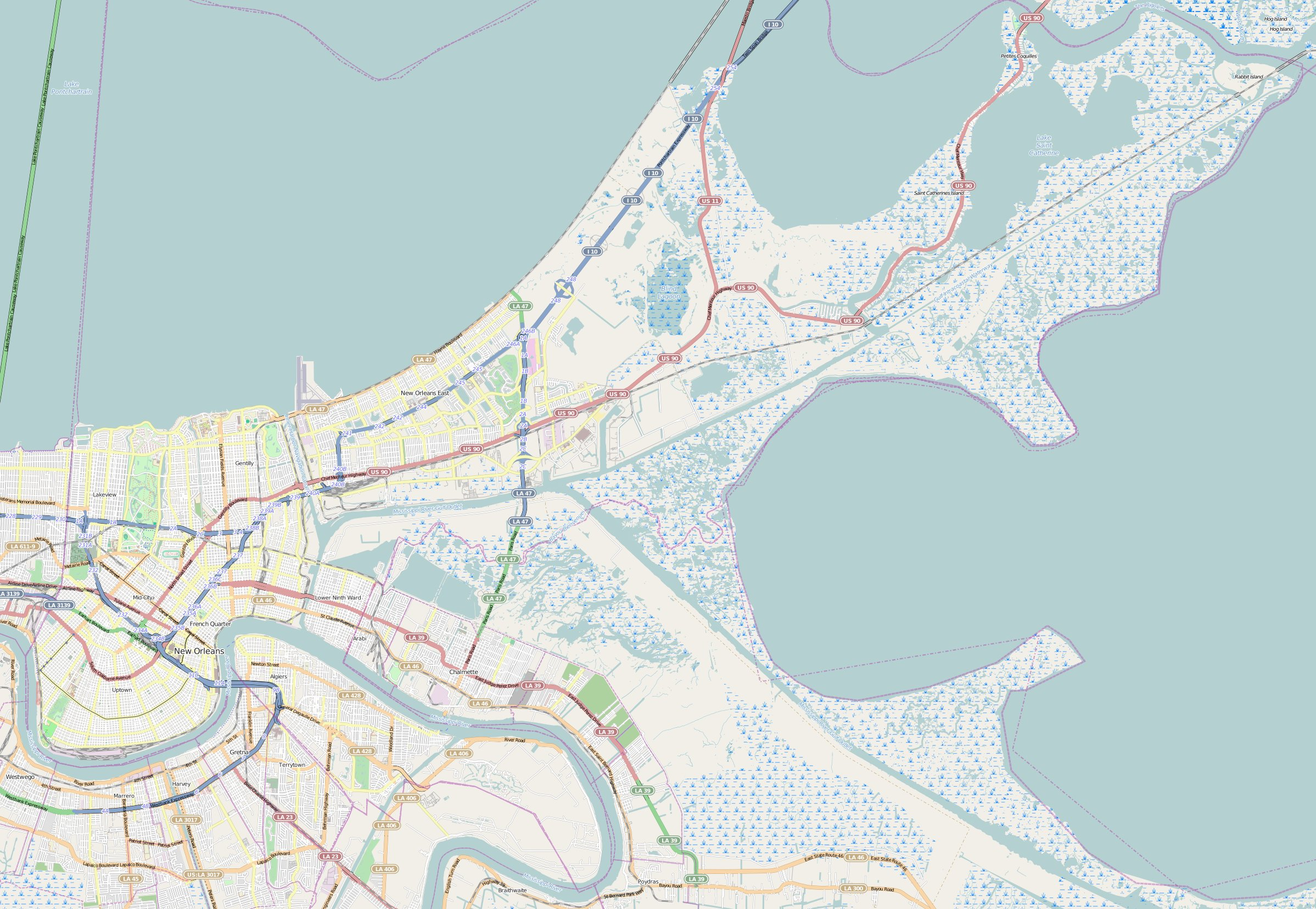
- Location within New Orleans Location within Louisiana Location within the United States
- Species: Southern live oak (Quercus virginiana)
- Location: Audubon Park, New Orleans, Louisiana
- Coordinates: 29.9210°N 90.1293°W
- Height: 60 ft (18 m)
- Girth: 35 ft (11 m)
- Date seeded: ~1740

The Tree of Life, also known as the Étienne de Boré Oak, is a large, historic southern live oak (Quercus virginiana) in Audubon Park in New Orleans, Louisiana. Adjacent to Audubon Zoo's giraffe exhibit, the old and popular park landmark was planted around 1740.

The tree is commonly hugged and climbed. Its crown is draped with Spanish moss. The tree's size and age led it to become one of the 43 inaugural members of the Live Oak Society.

== History ==
The tree is said to have been planted by Étienne de Boré, the first Mayor of New Orleans, in 1771, as a wedding gift to his wife. However, this is just a rumor, as a sign adjacent to the tree says that it was planted around 1740.
