= Étienne de Boré =

Creole French American (1741 – 1820) invented granulated sugar

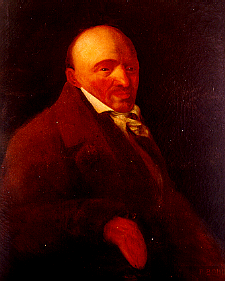

1st Mayor of New Orleans
- In office December 20, 1803 – May 26, 1804
- Preceded by: Position established
- Succeeded by: Cavelier Petit

Personal details
- Born: December 27, 1741 Kaskaskia, Upper Louisiana, New France
- Died: February 1, 1820 (aged 78) New Orleans, Louisiana, United States
- Spouse: Marie Marguerite d'Estrehan (m. 1771)
- Children: 3
- Relatives: Jean Noël Destréhan (brother-in-law)

Jean Étienne de Boré (27 December 1741 – 1 February 1820) was a Creole French planter, born in Kaskaskia, Illinois Country, who was known for producing the first granulated sugar in Louisiana. At the time, the area was under Spanish rule. His innovation made sugarcane profitable as a commodity crop and planters began to cultivate it in quantity. He owned a large plantation upriver from New Orleans. De Boré's plantation was annexed to the city of New Orleans in 1870, and is now the site of Audubon Park, Tulane University, and Audubon Zoo.

De Boré was a prominent planter in the area when the United States made the Louisiana Purchase and acquired the former French territories west of the Mississippi River. In 1803 the American governor of the territory appointed de Boré as the first mayor of New Orleans under the U.S. administration.

== Early life and education ==
Jean Étienne de Boré (known as Étienne) was born to French colonists in Kaskaskia, Illinois Country, then under French control as part of La Louisiane. At age 4, his parents sent him to France to be educated. On leaving school, he entered French military service in the elite Musketeers of the Guard, which was part of the royal household and very prestigious.

In 1771, he married Marie Marguerite d'Estréhan (1751–1814) of a prominent Creole family of colonial Louisiana. Her father, Jean Baptiste d'Estrehan, was the Royal Treasurer of French Louisiana. As part of her dowry, de Boré acquired an estate on the left bank of the Mississippi 6 miles (9.7 km) north of New Orleans. The property was annexed by the city of New Orleans in 1870, and is now the site of Audubon Zoo, Tulane University, and Audubon Park.

== Sugar granulation and New Orleans' first mayor ==
De Boré and his bride returned to Louisiana, then under Spanish control, to raise indigo on the plantation with its more than 80 enslaved people of African and American descent. By 1774, however, de Boré needed a new crop. Competition from Guatemala reduced the profitability of indigo, the soil was too poor for cotton, and the maize produced had no export value. Despite prior failures by Louisiana planters, including his father-in-law, de Boré was convinced good quality sugar could be produced along the Mississippi so he ordered his fields converted to the production of sugarcane and set up a sugar mill on the plantation to process the sugar.

In 1794, he planted his first set of canes, acquiring the seed stock from Mendez and Solis who produced tafia. He used that year's cane to seed his 1795 crop, working with Antoine Morin, a free man of color originally from Saint Domingue, where sugar cane was cultivated. Marie Marguerite had asked Morin to try to convince de Boré to abandon his sugar scheme, but when he would not be dissuaded, Morin offered to help. With a background in chemistry and botany, Morin was able to produce the first granulated sugar known in the colony. Although granulated sugar had been known for centuries in the Old World, granulation in Louisiana created a huge demand for the cultivation and processing of sugar cane. Responding to the worldwide demand for sugar, it became the colony's primary commodity crop. Under Spanish rule, Louisiana began to generate profits.

In late 1803, after the United States acquired New Orleans in the Louisiana Purchase, Orleans Territory Governor William C. C. Claiborne appointed de Boré as the first mayor of New Orleans under the United States rule. De Boré's service to the city had begun during the brief transitional French governorship of Pierre Clément de Laussat. In May 1804, De Boré resigned to look after his personal affairs.

== Legacy ==
He died at 78 years old and was interred in New Orleans' Saint Louis Cemetery No. 1. One of his grandchildren, Charles Gayarré, became a noted historian of Louisiana in the late 19th century.

Bore Street in Metairie is named for the Boré plantation. One of de Boré's sugar kettles is installed on the campus of Louisiana State University in Baton Rouge at the Cain Department of Chemical Engineering, which developed from the Audubon Sugar School that was incorporated into the university in 1897. The Étienne de Boré Oak in Audubon Park, also called 'The Tree of Life', was one of the original live oak trees inducted into the Live Oak Society in 1934.

De Boré's plantation house is still extant and became part of the campus of the New Orleans U.S. Marine Hospital and later Manning Family Children's. Is believed to be one of the oldest surviving structures in Uptown New Orleans, with its cypress inner frame dating from the late 1700s, and with most of its current core structure believed to have been constructed in the 1830s and expanded with wings and a new facade in the 1850s. It is now called Hales Cottage after a 2019–2022 renovation that restored it to its 1850s appearance, and it now hosts a coffeehouse.

In 1969, Étienne de Boré Elementary School opened in New Orleans as the first air-conditioned school in the city. In 1997, it was renamed Village de l'Est Elementary. In 2017, LSU announced it would rename Étienne de Boré Street as Field House Drive.

Political offices
Preceded by Position established	Mayor of New Orleans; 1803-1804	Succeeded by Cavelier Petit
