= Pitot House =

Historic house in Louisiana, United States

- U.S. National Register of Historic Places
- Location within East New Orleans Location within Louisiana Location within the United States
- Location: 1440 Moss St., New Orleans, Louisiana
- Coordinates: 29°58′54″N 90°5′21″W
- Area: 0.2 acres (0.081 ha)
- Architectural style: Colonial
- NRHP reference No.: 71000360
- Added to NRHP: September 28, 1971

The Pitot House is a historic landmark in New Orleans, Louisiana, and is listed on the National Register of Historic Places.

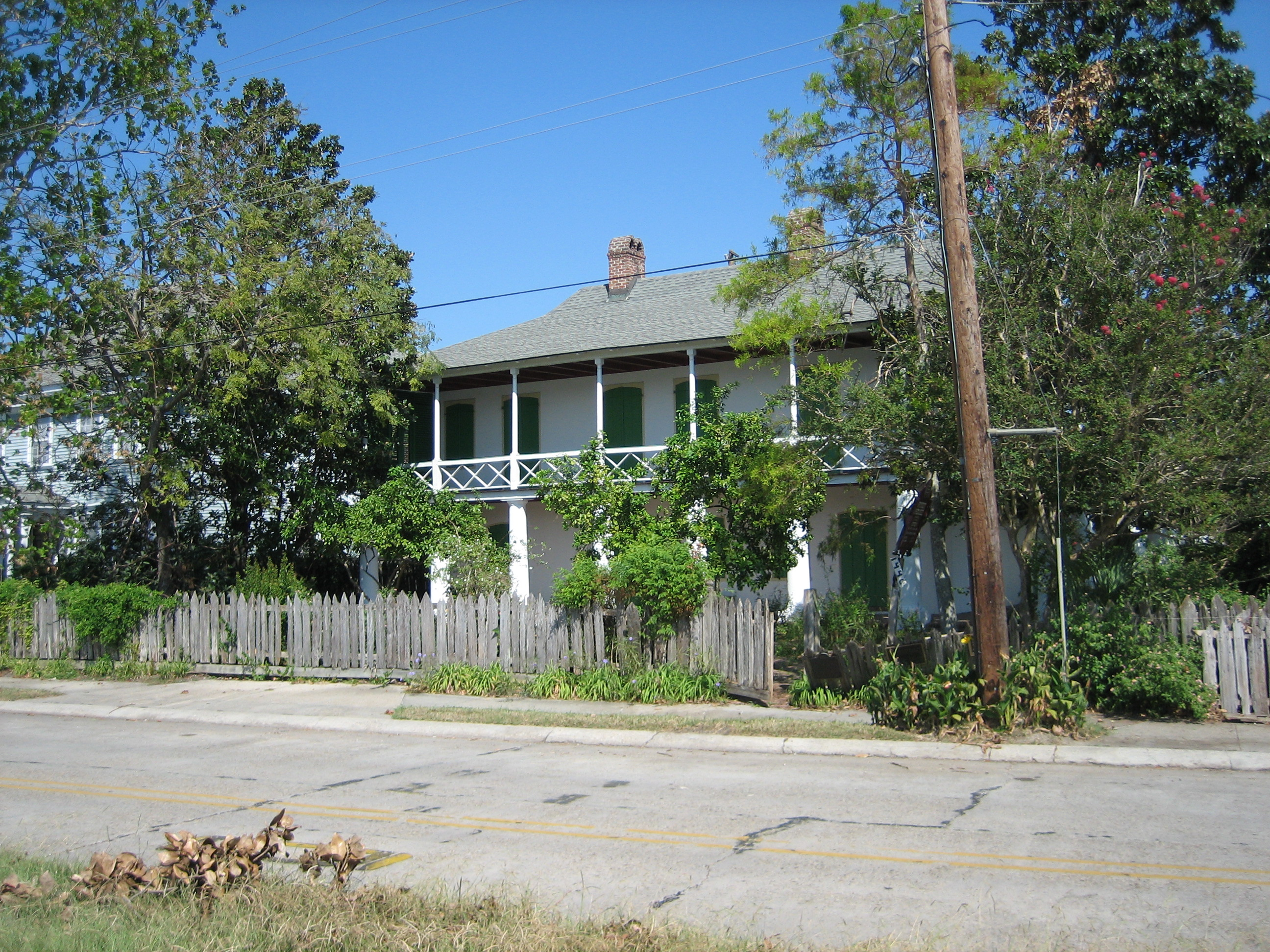
The James Pitot House

The Pitot House is an 18th-century Creole colonial country home located at 1440 Moss Street in New Orleans, Louisiana. The Pitot House is currently owned by the Louisiana Landmark Society, which uses the building as its headquarters. The house is situated on Bayou St. John and was moved several blocks from its original site in order to prevent its demolition.

== History ==
The Pitot House was initially constructed in 1799 by Don Bartólome Bosque as a country retreat along Bayou St. John. It is speculated that Bosque's house was a raised cottage on brick pillars. Bosque was a Spanish colonial official, whose daughter Suzette married Louisiana Governor William C.C. Claiborne.

NOTE: The 1790 in architecture article states that the house was finished in 1790 and was built by Don Santiago Lorreins.

It is also believed that during the ownership of Madame Rillieux (1805–1810), Edgar Degas' great-grandmother, the ground floor was enclosed with masonry walls of soft brick. Rillieux was also responsible for adding the southern gallery and several outbuildings, which are no longer extant.

The house is named for James Pitot, the fourth owner of the house who resided there from 1810 to 1819. Pitot is considered to be the first "American" mayor of New Orleans (1804–1805); for although he was a native of France, he became a naturalized American citizen before arriving in New Orleans in 1796. Inside are American and Louisiana antiques from the early 19th century, but the antiques are not original to the home. A portrait of Sophie Gabrielle, James Pitot's daughter, is the only artifact owned by any past resident of the house.

Other notable owners of the house include Felix Ducayet and Mother Cabrini, America's first named saint.

== House ==
The home is within yards of the site of the "bayou bridge" which Governor Claiborne ordered the military "to permit no Negroes to pass or repass the same" during the events known as the 1811 German Coast Uprising. This event, said by some historians to be the largest slave uprising on American soil (a theory not recognized by all) caused white families living upriver in January 1811 to stream into New Orleans along Metairie Road. That road was the "highland" road which crossed the bridge at Bayou St. John, providing access to the traditional "back of town" entrance along Bayou Road into the city.

The house was saved from destruction by the Louisiana Landmarks Society in 1964 and restored to its original splendor, showing the double-pitched hipped roof, and the plaster-covered brick-between-post (briquette-entre-poteaux) construction. The wooden posts act as structural support, the brick offers thermal insulation, and the plaster protects this medley from dampness and rot.

The style of the Pitot House is ensuite—with no hallways and an outdoor stairway. The house was designed with hot summers and insects in mind. The doors were positioned across from each other to keep cool air moving. The extended galleries on both the bottom and top levels of the house keep the sun off the walls and offer outdoor breezeways.

The Pitot House was also designed to withstand floods and was able to survive the floods of Hurricane Katrina due to brick floors on the bottom level of the house which would have originally been caulked with a dry mix of sand and lime, allowing flood waters to drain through. The gallery, back loggia, and sleeping porch were used for outdoor entertaining, dining, and sleeping; they were fitted with shutters to provide relief from the intense Louisiana sun.

== Garden ==
The garden at the Pitot House grows plants traditional to the time period when the Pitot House was built. These plants include indigenous flowers, citrus trees, perennials, bulbs, antique roses, camellias, herbs, and vegetables. The garden is a traditional parterre garden, designed to be viewed from the above gallery, with the boxwood hedges recently restored.

A native plants garden showcases Louisiana wildflowers and shrubs along the perimeter of the parterre. Next to the house is a 10,000-square-foot (930 m^{2}) yard, where parties and events are held.

== See also ==
- National Register of Historic Places listings in Orleans Parish, Louisiana
