= James Pitot =

American politician (1761–1831)

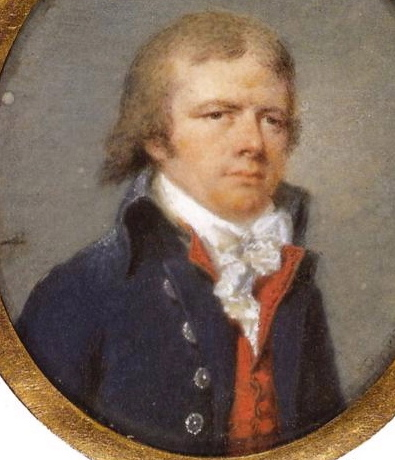

Mayor of New Orleans
- In office June 6, 1804 – July 26, 1805
- Preceded by: Cavelier Petit
- Succeeded by: John Watkins

Personal details
- Born: November 25, 1761 Villedieu-les-Poêles, France
- Died: November 4, 1831 (aged 69) New Orleans, Louisiana
- Party: Independent

James Pitot (November 25, 1761 – November 4, 1831), also known as Jacques Pitot, was the third Mayor of New Orleans, after Cavelier Petit served for a ten-day interim following Mayor Boré's resignation. Because he had already attained American citizenship, he is sometimes called New Orleans' first American mayor.

== Biography ==
Born Jacques-François Pitot in Normandy and educated in Paris, Pitot's family was of the nobility of France and fled that nation during the French Revolution. Jacques Pitot left Saint-Domingue (later Haiti) and settled in Philadelphia, where he became an American citizen, and then lived in Norfolk, Virginia. After his 1796 arrival in Spanish-held Louisiana, he prospered as a merchant and became a member of the New Orleans city council.

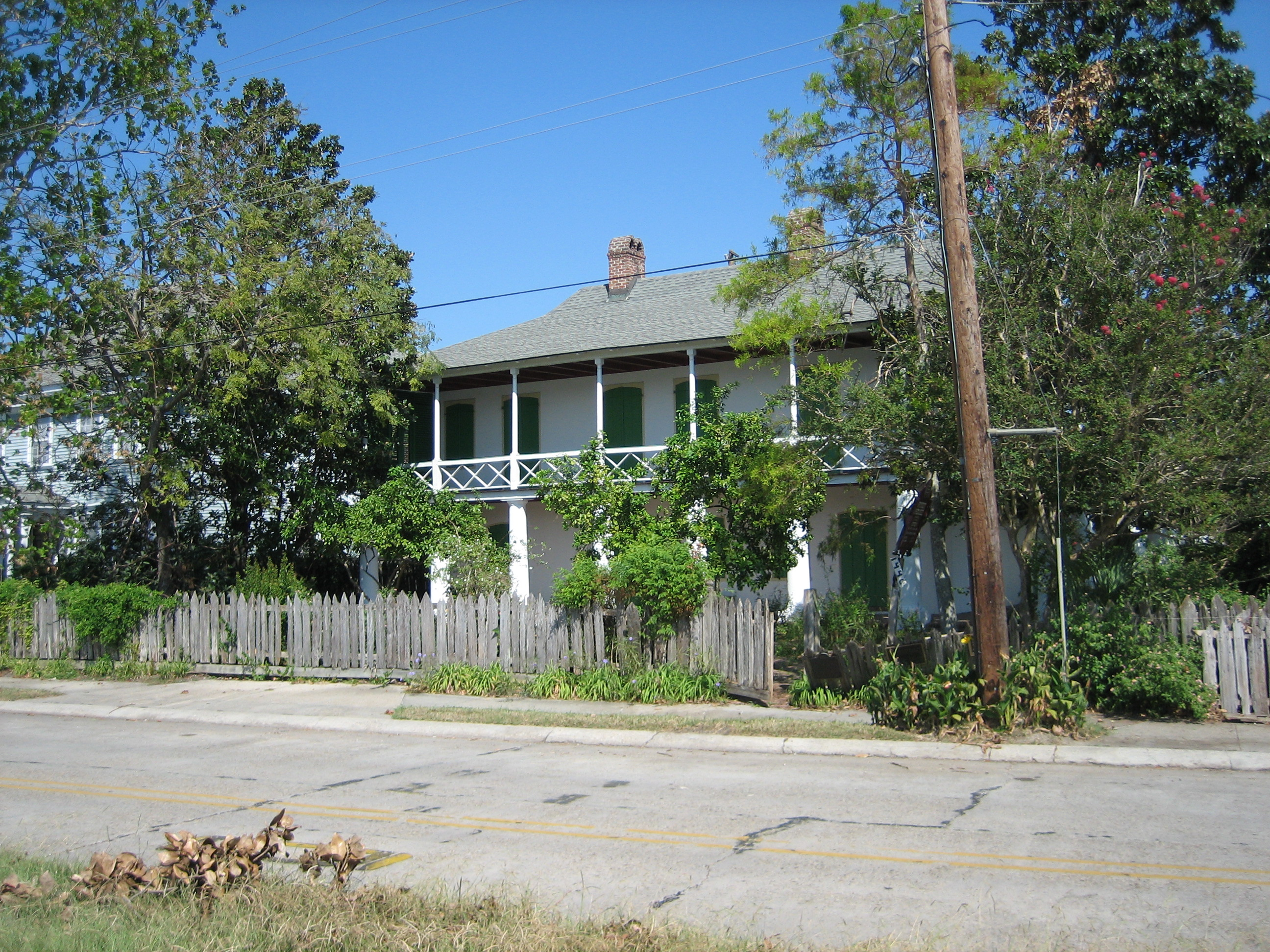
The James Pitot House

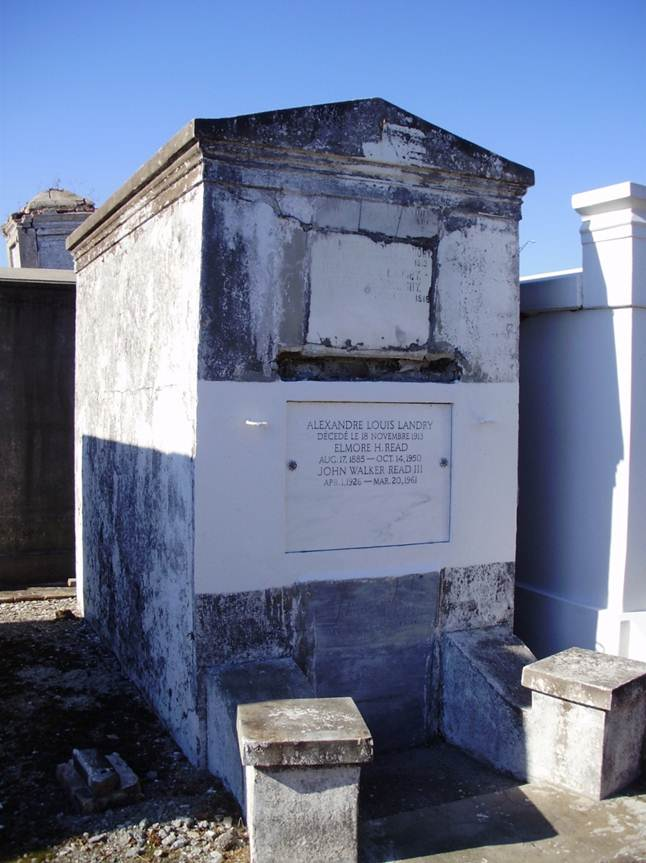
Tomb of Jacques Pitot, at St. Louis Cemetery No. 2

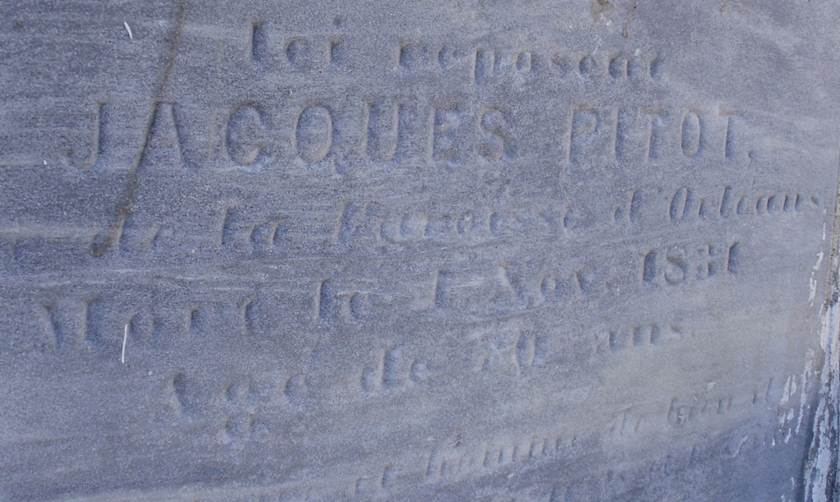
Jacques Pitot grave marker

James Pitot was appointed mayor by Territorial Governor William C. C. Claiborne. He served from 6 June 1804 to 26 July 1805. During Mayor Pitot's administration the first city charter of New Orleans was enacted, including the first public elections of aldermen or city councilmen.

After he resigned as mayor, Claiborne appointed him as Probate Court judge for the Orleans Territory, a position he continued to hold after Louisiana became a state. Judge James Pitot served the legal community until his death on November 4, 1831.

He was also President of the New Orleans Navigation Company, which was granted the right to operate a toll canal extending from Bayou St. John into the Tremé neighborhood, terminating in the 'turning basin' which eventually gave its name to Basin Street. This route saved shippers many expensive days and risks of navigating the winding Mississippi River below New Orleans, in the Age of Sail. (Bayou St. John connects to Lake Pontchartrain, which in turn leads to the Gulf of Mexico.

Pitot's home alongside Bayou St. John still stands, now a museum, the Pitot House. The home is near the "bayou bridge" which Governor Claiborne ordered the military "to permit no Negroes to pass or repass the same," during the event known as the 1811 slave uprising.

== Battle of New Orleans ==
Jacques Pitot is not properly remembered for his role as president of the Orleans Parish police jury (comparable to the head of a 'county commission' elsewhere), when during the War of 1812, on January 31, 1814, he authorized the re-enlisting of free people of color into the local militia. This was a bold move, coming eighteen months after Louisiana had become a state and less than seven years after Orleans Territorial Governor Claiborne had been wounded in a duel with his nemesis, Daniel Clark. Clark's challenge was based on Claiborne's recognition of the militia battalion of free men of color in 1804, shortly after the United States took possession of the formerly French province.

Pitot's action built upon the long-standing network of kinship, economic ties, trade, and cultural ties free people of color had, not only up and down the Mississippi River from New Orleans with both slave-holding whites and with enslaved people, but also throughout the Caribbean and Gulf trade region, including Jamaica, where the British launched their attack against New Orleans in December 1814.

British efforts to lure away both slaves and free blacks to their side of the conflict were not as successful as they had hoped. Pitot's volunteer militia, including the free men of color, joined other units of free men of color, as well as numerous slaves, who were crucial to the defeat of the British invasion under the unified command of General Andrew Jackson.

== See also ==
- Pitot House
- Genevieve Pitot

Preceded by Cavelier Petit	Mayor of New Orleans; June 6, 1804 – July 26, 1805	Succeeded by John Watkins
