= George Floyd protests in Atlanta =

2020 civil unrest after the murder of George Floyd

- Part of George Floyd protests in Georgia and the 2020–2021 United States racial unrest
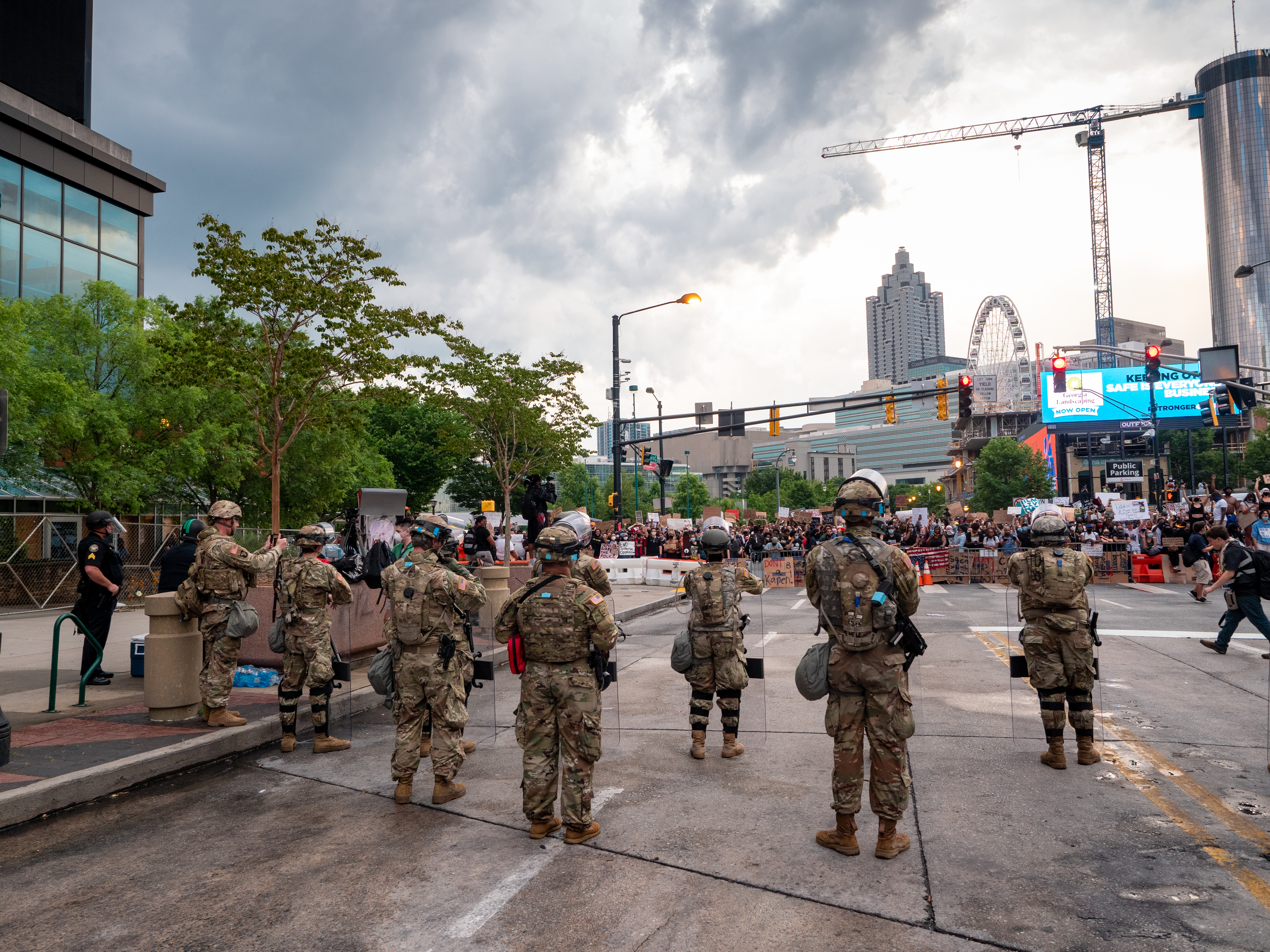
- Georgia National Guard troops and protesters near Centennial Olympic Park, June 4
- Date: May – June 2020 (Note: While sources tend to agree that May 29 was the start of protesting in the city, a solid end date is unclear, with one source published in October 2020 mentioning "months of periodic protests". Additional protesting occurred in April 2021 following the killing of Daunte Wright and the verdict in the trial of Derek Chauvin.) (1 month)
- Location: Atlanta, Georgia, United States
- Caused by: Murder of Ahmaud Arbery; Killing of Rayshard Brooks; Murder of George Floyd; Shooting of Tony McDade; Killing of Breonna Taylor; Police brutality; Racial inequality

The George Floyd protests in Atlanta were a series of protests occurring in Atlanta, the capital and largest city of Georgia, United States. The protests were part of the George Floyd protests and, more broadly, the 2020–2021 United States racial unrest, which began shortly after the murder of George Floyd by police officer Derek Chauvin in Minneapolis on May 25, 2020. On May 26, protesting occurred in the Minneapolis–Saint Paul area and, over the next several weeks, protests spread to cities throughout the United States and then internationally.

In Atlanta, protesting began on May 29, the first Friday following Floyd's murder. The protests primarily centered around Centennial Olympic Park in downtown Atlanta, where several hundred protesters gathered on the first night, though other sites that saw extensive protesting included the Georgia State Capitol, Atlanta City Hall, and the Georgia Governor's Mansion, among other places. On the first day, protesting was primarily peaceful in nature until later in the evening, when the situation became more violent. Protesters and police clashed throughout the night as several buildings and vehicles around the Centennial Olympic Park area were damaged or vandalized. Of particular note, the CNN Center (headquarters of the international news channel CNN) was the site of extensive fighting between police stationed inside the building and protesters outside. During the night, then Atlanta Mayor Keisha Lance Bottoms declared a state of emergency and Georgia Governor Brian Kemp activated the Georgia National Guard; over a thousand troops deployed to Atlanta the next day. The following day, Mayor Bottoms instated a 9 p.m. curfew. The next few days would follow a similar pattern to the first, with protests during the day becoming more intense into the night. Several hundred protesters were arrested during the first several nights of protests, June 5 being the first night since the protests began that no protesters were arrested.

On June 12, a police officer in the city shot and killed Rayshard Brooks outside of a Wendy's downtown, which triggered another large-scale wave of protests. The next day, about a thousand protesters congregated near the site of Brooks' death, and later that evening, the restaurant was burned down. Protesting continued through June, with several large demonstrations occurring on Juneteenth (June 19). A definitive end to the protesting is unclear, with one source published in October 2020 mentioning "months of periodic protests" in the city. Additional protests were held in April 2021 following the killing of Daunte Wright and the announcement of the verdict in the trial of Derek Chauvin.

== Background ==
On May 25, 2020, George Floyd, a 46-year-old African American man, was murdered while in police custody in Minneapolis, Minnesota. Part of Floyd's arrest was caught on video by a bystander and later went viral after being uploaded to Facebook. The video showed police officer Derek Chauvin pinning Floyd to the ground with his knee on the back of Floyd's neck while Floyd is heard saying "I can't breathe". The four officers involved in Floyd's arrest were fired the following day.

On May 26, thousands of protesters in Minneapolis gathered at both the site of Floyd's arrest and the Minneapolis Police Department's Third Precinct to protest his murder, during which police employed chemical irritants to disperse crowds. By May 27, these George Floyd protests had spread to several more major cities throughout the United States, and the following day, amidst increasing violence with the protests, Minnesota Governor Tim Walz activated the Minnesota National Guard, a move that would later be followed by other state governors.

== Timeline ==
=== May 2020 ===
==== May 29 ====
At 8:30 a.m. on May 29, a Friday, police were called to Oakland Cemetery after a maintenance crew reported vandalism to two Confederate memorials in the cemetery: the Lion of the Confederacy and the Confederate Obelisk. The vandalism had occurred at some point during the night.

Protests in Atlanta began on the afternoon of May 29, when several hundred people gathered in downtown Atlanta, near Centennial Olympic Park. The protests were not only over the murder of George Floyd, but also the killing of Breonna Taylor and the murder of Ahmaud Arbery, two African Americans who had been killed earlier that year by either police officers or former police officers. Protest organizers planned on meeting at Centennial Olympic Park around 3 p.m. before marching to the Georgia State Capitol and then returning to the park by 5:30 pm, with the march called "Justice for Us". Protesters chanted "No justice, no peace", "I can't breathe", and "Say his name", while a moment of silence was observed at the capitol. At some point, there was a silent demonstration of protesters standing with raised fists. The protest organizers urged participants to observe social distancing guidelines (the protest was occurring during the COVID-19 pandemic) and stressed the nonviolent nature of the march.

While this protesting was initially peaceful, by approximately 6 pm, the situation had become more tense. According to The Atlanta Journal-Constitution, around this time, some protesters began throwing bottles at Atlanta Police Department (APD) officers. By 6:25 pm, the APD's SWAT team had arrived at the scene of the protest. At about 6:35 pm, according to reports from the scene, protesters were ordered to disperse or face arrest, though APD Chief Erika Shields told reporters that there was no curfew in place at that time and that protesters could stay in the streets. According to an article from WABE, protesters "stood down police after demands to disperse". Some protesters chanted "Quit your jobs" at the police officers present. Several police vehicles were damaged during the protesting, and one APD car was set on fire. Additionally, three Georgia Tech Police Department vehicles were destroyed, and several rifles stolen from the vehicles. One tank was spotted during the protest.

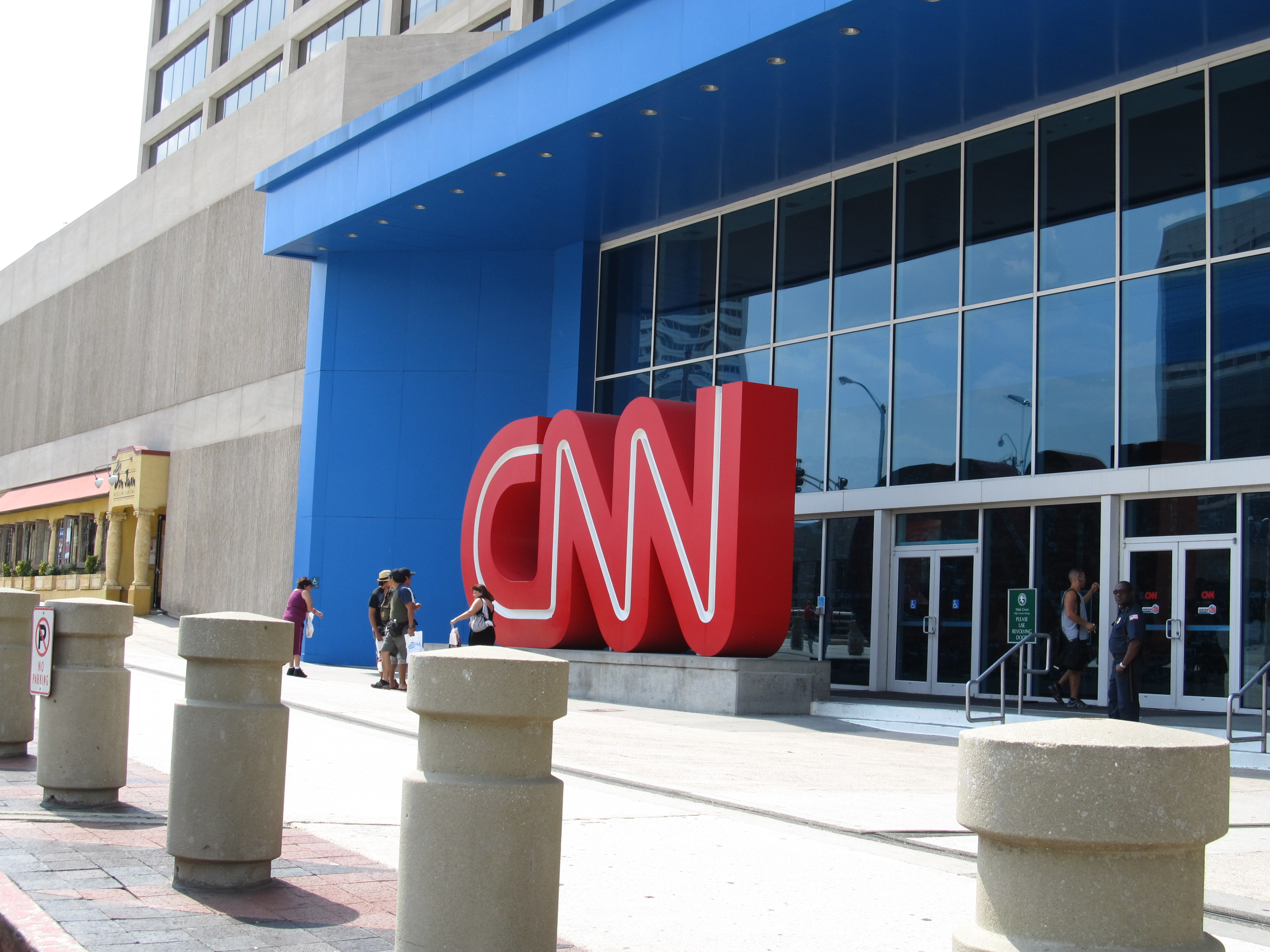
The large CNN sign outside of the CNN Center was heavily vandalized during the first night of protests.

As the violence escalated, several buildings near Centennial Olympic Park were damaged. A glass door leading into the nearby Omni Hotel was shattered, as were the windows on the College Football Hall of Fame, with people stealing merchandise from the latter. However, the vandalism was limited only to the gift shop and none of the exhibits or artifacts had been damaged. Another target of vandalism was the CNN Center, the headquarters for the international television news channel CNN. Protesters had begun moving towards the entrance of that building, where police officers had congregated, around 6 pm. A large sign of the CNN logo located outside of the headquarters was vandalized with spray paint, with messages written on the sign including "ACAB", "Fuck Trump", "Not one more", and "#LOVE". One protester climbed atop the sign and waved a Black Lives Matter flag, which elicited cheers from other protesters, while another protester burned an American flag. A restaurant near the CNN Center was vandalized. Several CNN employees viewed the protesting from inside the building. One CNN journalist in the building captured footage of a protester breaking a window on the building, while other protesters threw bottles and other projectiles at the building, including smoke grenades. Shortly after 8 pm, the protesters seemingly began shifting their focus from violently taking out any barriers (windows and doors) leading into the building, to actually finding a way to enter. While police had been trying to keep protesters out of the building, by 9 pm, the officers had moved to a position inside the building. Police formed a line inside the building's lobby and threw tear gas and shot rubber bullets in an effort to keep the crowd from entering the building. At one point, a firecracker was thrown into the lobby. The standoff between police and protesters in the building was broadcast live on CNN. Eventually, the area was cleared by law enforcement.

As the protests became violent, Atlanta Mayor Keisha Lance Bottoms held a press conference to discuss the protests. Mayor Bottoms was joined by activist Bernice King (daughter of civil rights activist Martin Luther King Jr.) and rappers Killer Mike and T.I. During the conference, Bottoms decried the violence and urged the protesters to go home. At around 8:30 pm, former Atlanta mayor and U.N. Ambassador Andrew Young was interviewed and said, "I'm thinking I want to cry. This was a good demonstration that went bad". At some point during the protests, (Note: Sources differ on when exactly Governor Kemp activated the National Guard. The New York Times states that it occurred "[l]ate Friday", while the New York Daily News states that it occurred "[e]arly Saturday morning". A later report from The Atlanta Journal-Constitution gives an exact time as 12:11 am.) Georgia Governor Brian Kemp activated the Georgia National Guard "to protect people & property in Atlanta", with as many as 500 troops becoming active. Governor Kemp stated that he was acting on a request from Mayor Bottoms. In addition, a state of emergency was declared in Fulton County. After this, news channel WXIA-TV reported that the protests moved north, initially along Marietta Street. Through the morning of May 30, police and firefighters responded to calls of vandalism, looting, and arson in Buckhead, which is considered an "upscale" area of the city. In particular, damage to stores was reported around Phipps Plaza, Lindbergh, and along Piedmont Road and Peachtree Road. In one case, firefighters were unable to reach a burning building due to protesting around it. Several Atlanta Fire Rescue Department fire trucks were damaged during the night. Shortly before midnight, the Fulton County Sheriff's Office announced that the entirety of their law enforcement division had been dispatched to the Lenox area. In the aftermath of the first night of protests, the APD stated that three officers had been injured. In addition, 20 APD vehicles were damaged. At least 70 protesters were arrested, (Note: Sources vary slightly on the exact number of arrests, with an article from CNBC giving a number of 70, The Atlanta Journal-Constitution reporting 71, WSB-TV reporting that there were "at least 71" arrests, and WXIA-TV giving the number as 77.) with two police buses brought to downtown to help handle arrests. At least one protester had been shot.

==== May 30 ====
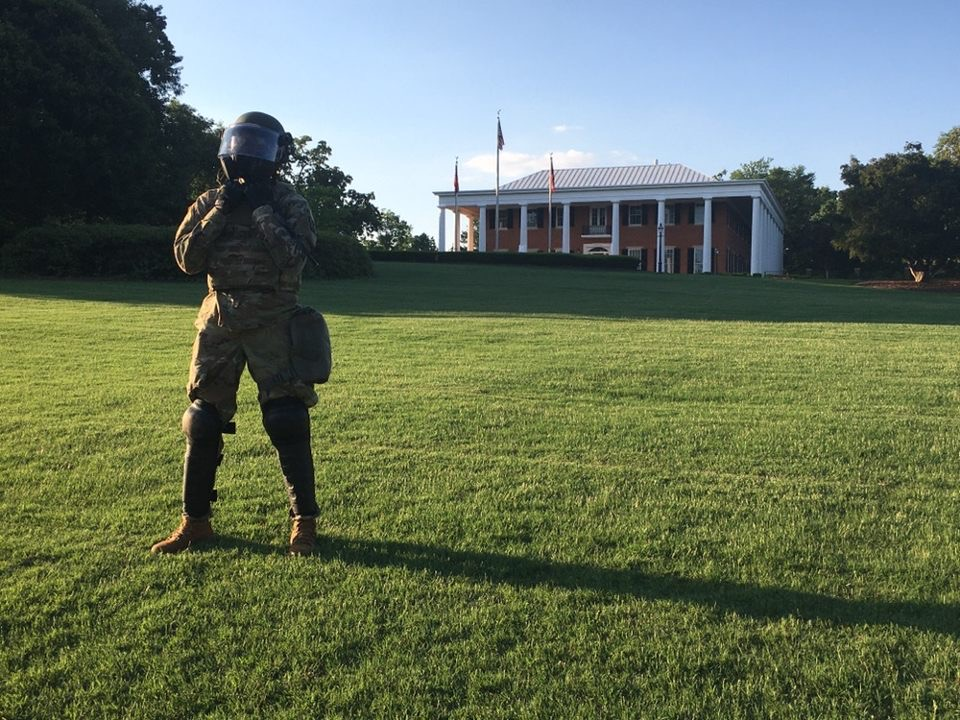
A Georgia National Guard soldier in front of the Georgia Governor's Mansion, May 30

By the morning of May 30, the CNN sign had been cleaned and repainted. Also that morning, professional basketball player and Marietta, Georgia native Jaylen Brown (who at the time was playing for the Boston Celtics) announced his intent to travel to Atlanta to peacefully protest that day. He was joined by fellow National Basketball Association players Malcolm Brogdon and Justin Anderson. Throughout the day, protesters gathered near the CNN Center, as well as several other locations throughout the city, such as at the Georgia Governor's Mansion and the Martin Luther King Jr. National Historical Park. Around 7 pm, Mayor Bottoms issued a citywide curfew for 9 pm, calling it a "very unusual and extreme step". In addition, she urged protesters to get tested for COVID-19. At the same time, Police Chief Shields called some of the destructive acts that had occurred the previous night a "highly calculated terrorist act" and stated, "Quite frankly, I'm just ready to lock people up." That same night, Governor Kemp announced that 3,000 National Guard troops would be deployed throughout the state, which he announced was under a state of emergency. Of these, approximately 1,500 were deployed to Atlanta, where the Lenox Square Mall was used as their staging area. Several shopping malls in the Atlanta metropolitan area closed early in preparation for possible damaging actions from protests. Several arrests would be made at malls in the area.

Protesting was more subdued than the previous night. Several minutes before the 9 p.m. curfew, police in downtown Atlanta used tear gas to disperse several hundred protesters, after which they began using plastic handcuffs to arrest curfew violators. Several protesters were arrested before the curfew began. By 11:26 pm, 51 people had been arrested. Additionally, one police vehicle had been damaged, as well as a police precinct and several buildings in downtown Atlanta. Late Saturday night, one police officer was struck by an all-terrain vehicle, with the driver arrested shortly thereafter. By the following morning, 157 people had been arrested.

At one point during the night, two college students (attending Morehouse College and Spelman College) in downtown Atlanta were forcibly pulled from their car, stunned, and arrested by police. The incident was captured on video and two of the five officers involved were fired the following day. Mayor Bottoms called the officers' actions "an excessive use of force". Several days later, the police involved in the incident were charged with various crimes associated with their actions, including aggravated assault and criminal damage to property. The following year, the two drivers would sue the city due to the police's actions. Also at some point during the night, Haisten Willis, a reporter covering the protests for The Atlanta Journal-Constitution, was arrested.

==== May 31 ====
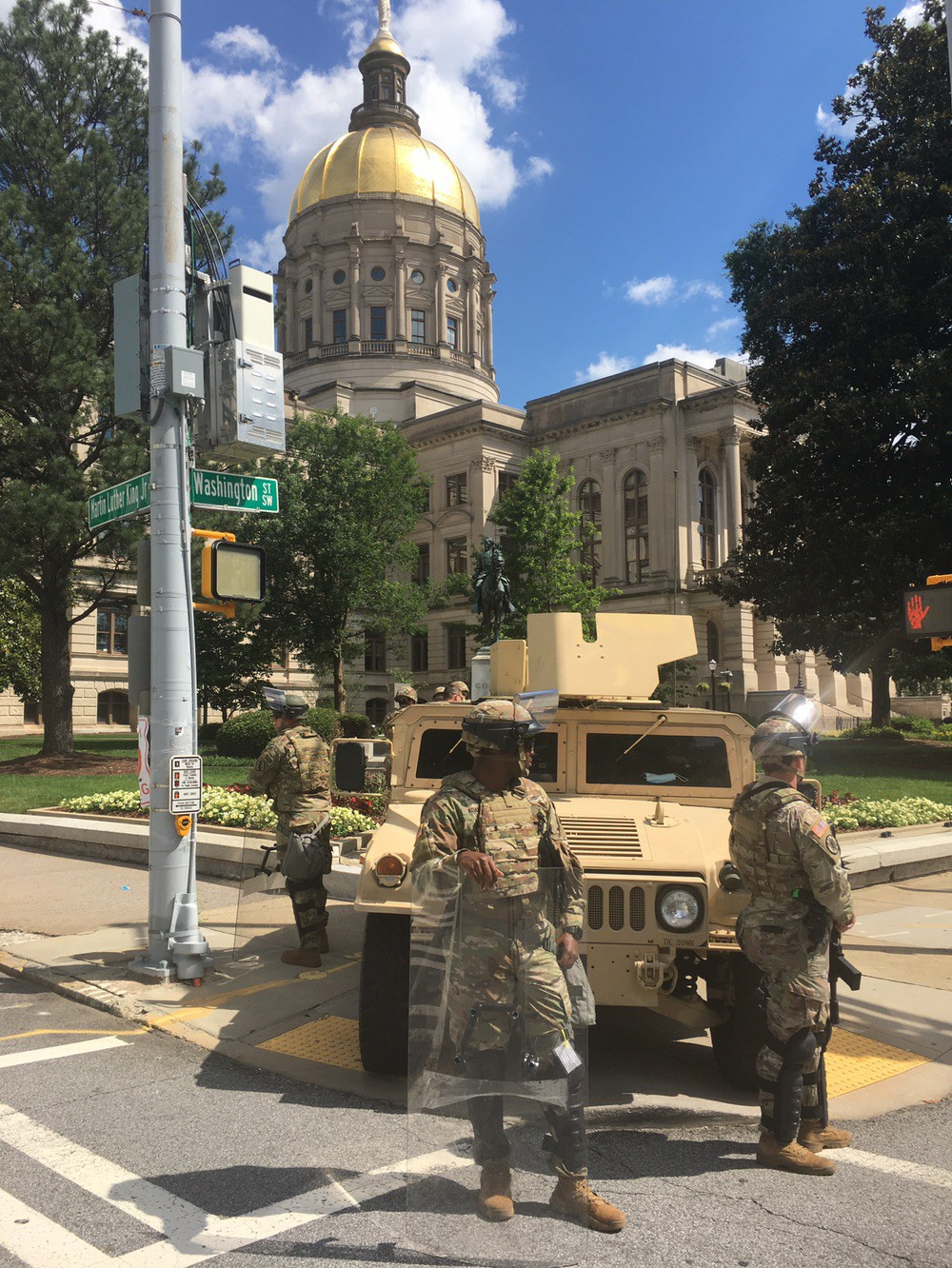
Members of the National Guard stationed in front of the Georgia State Capitol, May 31

Around noon, Mayor Bottoms held a press conference where she stated that the curfew had been extended. Earlier in the day, she had been interviewed on CBS (as part of the channel's Face the Nation program) and NBC, where she criticized U.S. President Donald Trump for exacerbating the situation with his rhetoric regarding the protests. At the time, Mayor Bottoms was considered to be a possible candidate for running mate for then-presidential candidate Joe Biden. As a result of the curfew extension, the Metropolitan Atlanta Rapid Transit Authority stated they would be suspending their transit activities at 9 pm. Protests on this day were considered more peaceful than during the previous night, with several hundred police and National Guard soldiers stationed near Centennial Olympic Park. According to a later report by WXIA-TV, 64 arrests were made this day.

=== June 2020 ===
==== June 1 ====
Protests on this day started near Atlanta City Hall, where several dozen protesters met around 12:45 pm. According to a report in the student newspaper The Signal, this was "in response to the state lawmaker’s failure to pass hate crime bills in Georgia." By 2:10 pm, the government of Atlanta once again extended the curfew for that night. Around the same time, several hundred protesters gathered outside the Georgia State Capitol, where reporters for WXIA-TV stated that some protesters had told them that they planned to block traffic on the Downtown Connector later that day. Around 3:20 pm, several groups attempt to do this, but after a confrontation with police, agreed to remain off of the Downtown Connector. Around this same time, photographer Alyssa Pointer of The Atlanta Journal-Constitution was detained by police, but was released shortly afterwards. Several dozen more protesters were arrested in the afternoon, with many processed at temporary stations set up near the capitol. Near 6:50 pm, several police officers joined with protesters in taking the knee. A short time after this, a large group of protesters assembled near Centennial Olympic Park and began marching towards the capitol, arriving there around 8 pm, where police fired tear gas into the crowds. By 8:10 pm, most of the protesters had dispersed. Over the course of the protests, over 50 people were arrested. (Note: WXIA-TV reported that 52 people had been arrested by 8 pm, while WSB-TV reported that 55 people were arrested during the attempt to get onto the Downtown Connector.) A reporter for WXIA-TV stated that she saw more police and National Guard troops than at any other point in the previous nights. Following the curfew, there were very few protesters on the streets. Television star Porsha Williams was present during some of the protesting.

==== June 2 ====
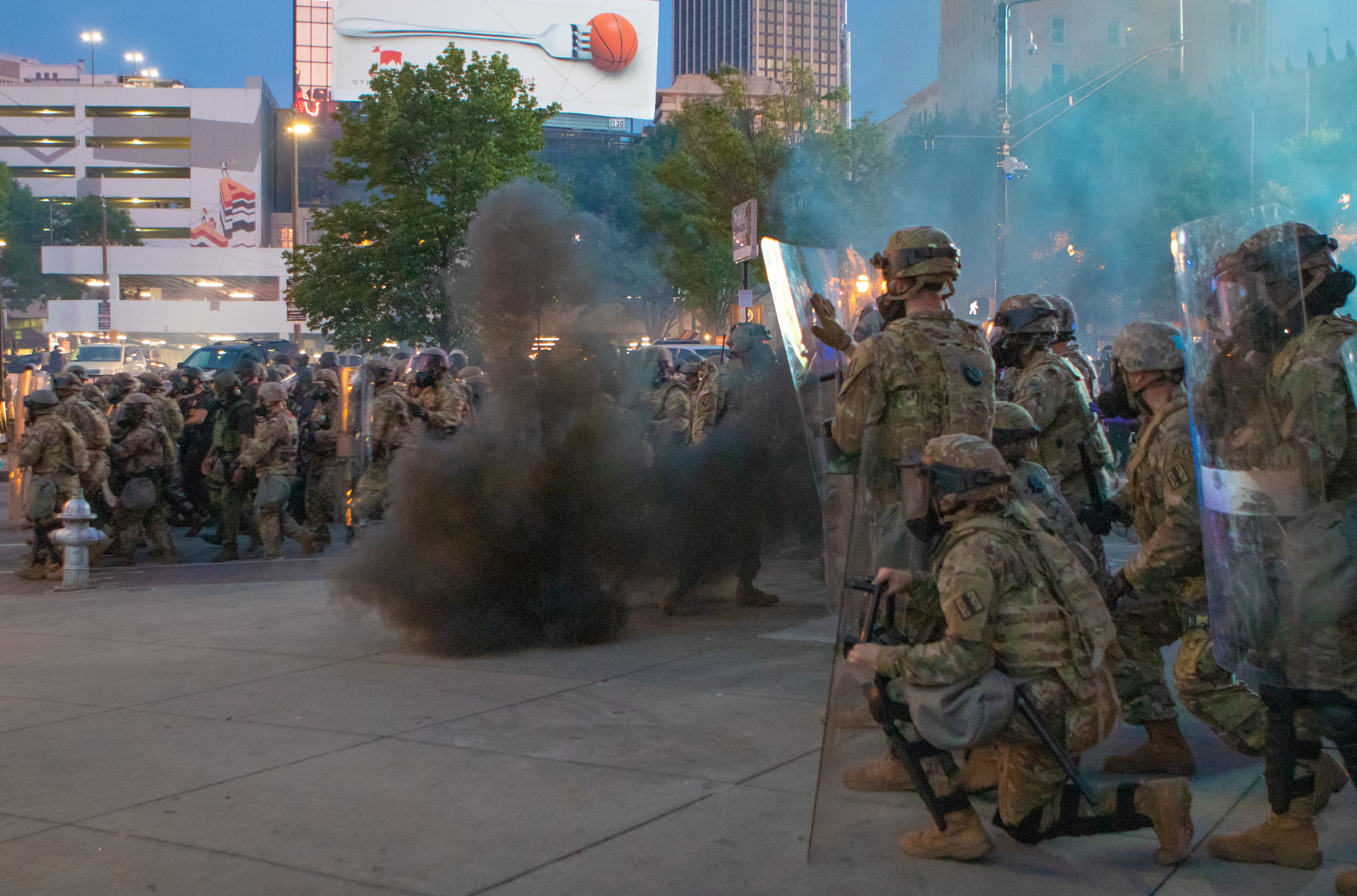
National Guard soldiers in Centennial Olympic Park, June 2

The 9 p.m. curfew was extended for the fourth night on June 2. That same day, Governor Kemp held a press conference where he praised law enforcement officers for their response during the protests. Around 7 pm, a group of protesters gathered near the Fox Theatre, where they held a moment of silence in honor of Floyd, while in Centennial Olympic Park, tear gas was again used to disperse crowds. Shortly after 7 pm, police near the capitol used tear gas and rubber bullets to disperse a crowd of about 200 people who had been protesting there. The move came about two hours before the curfew time, and many of the protesters there reported not hearing any warnings before the crowd dispersal began. In total, 35 people were arrested there. Later that evening, some protesters got into altercations with looters near Underground Atlanta. By the end of the night, 52 arrests had been made.

==== June 3 ====
On June 3, the government of Atlanta announced that the curfew would be extended until the end of the week. It would start at 9 p.m. on June 3 and June 4, and at 8 p.m. for June 5 through June 7. That same day, Governor Kemp held another press conference where he condemned the violence in the protests, saying, "In what started as a peaceful protest Friday, ended in violence and destruction. A powerful moment was ultimately corrupted by some with a different agenda."

==== June 4 ====
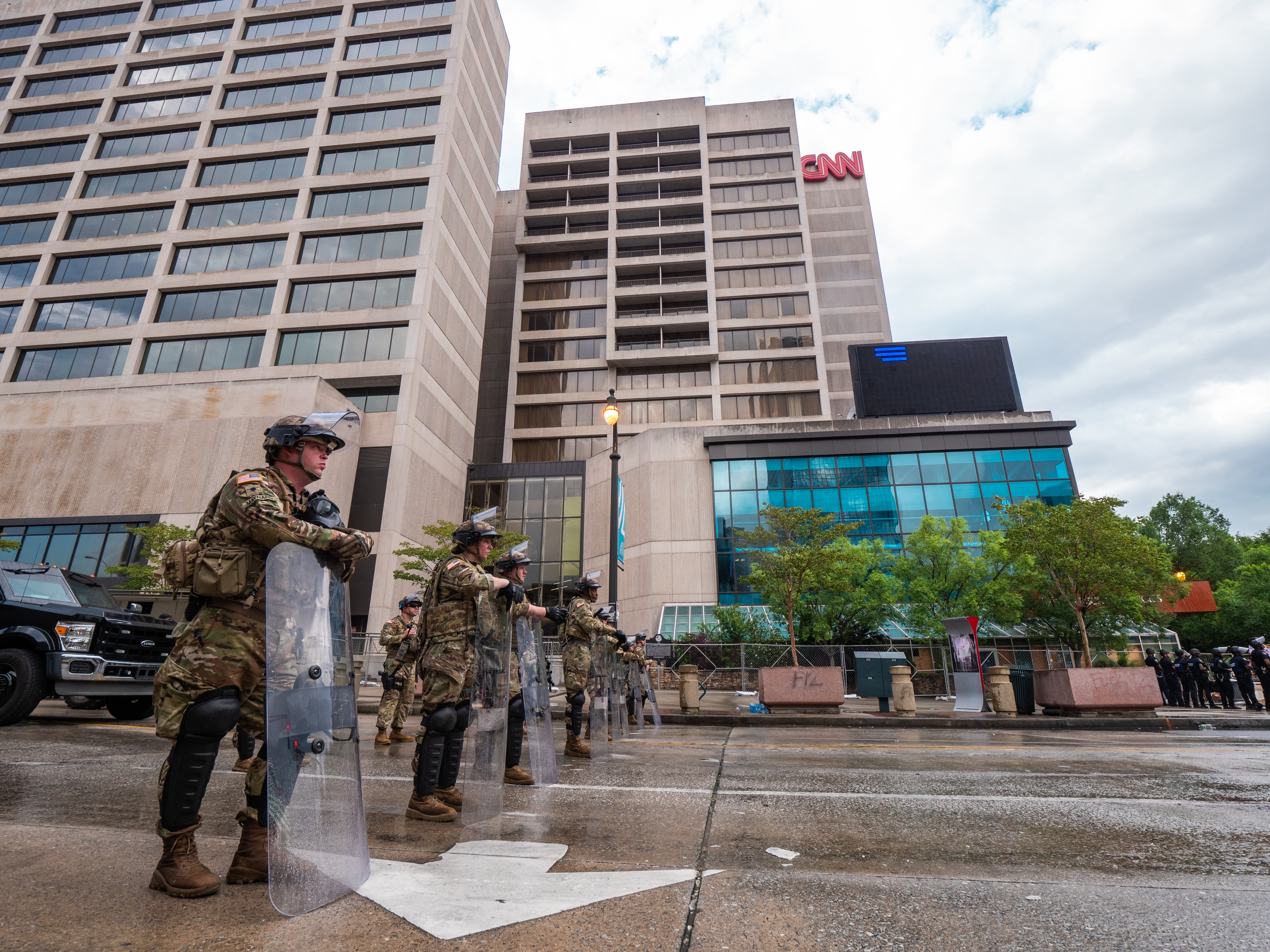
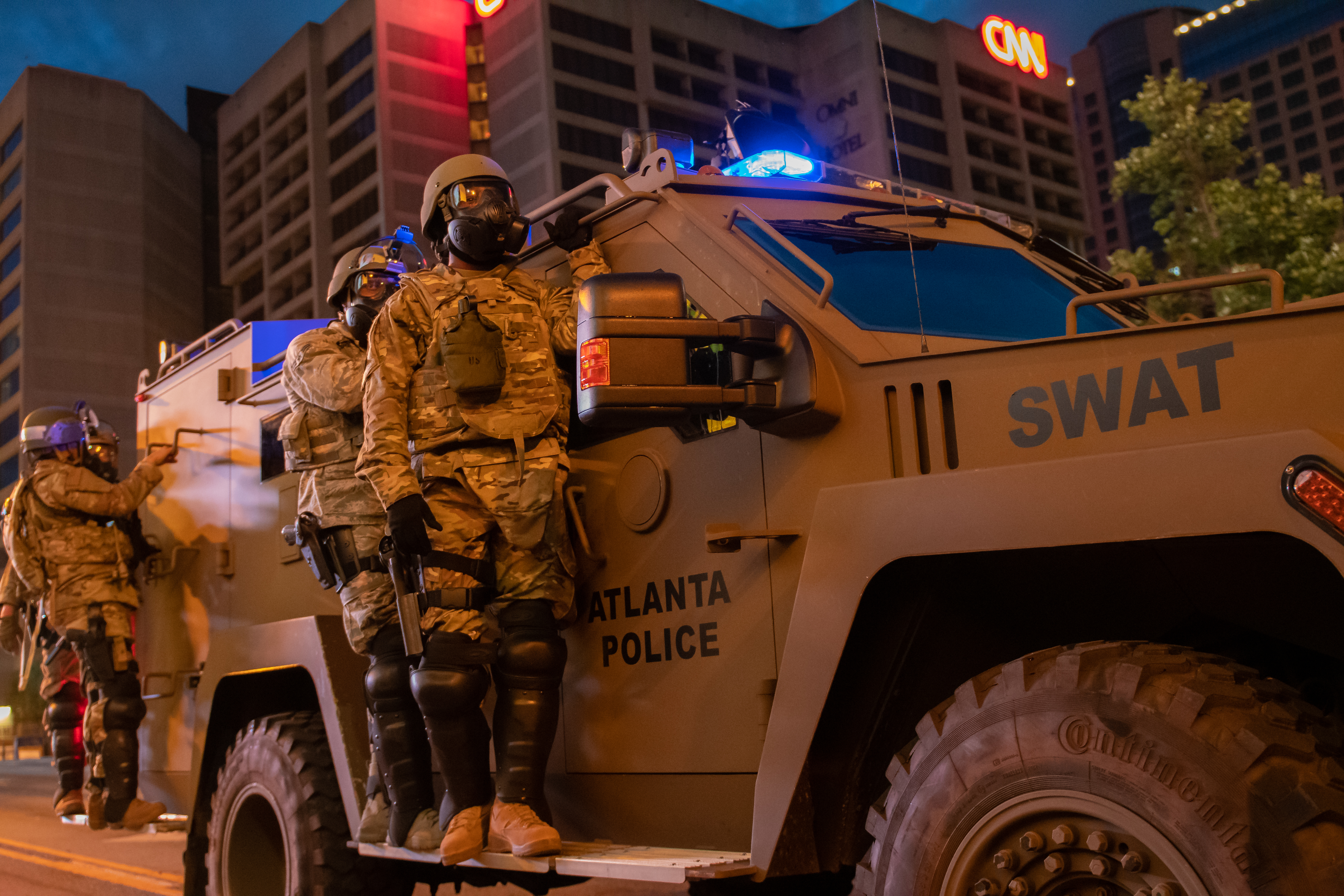
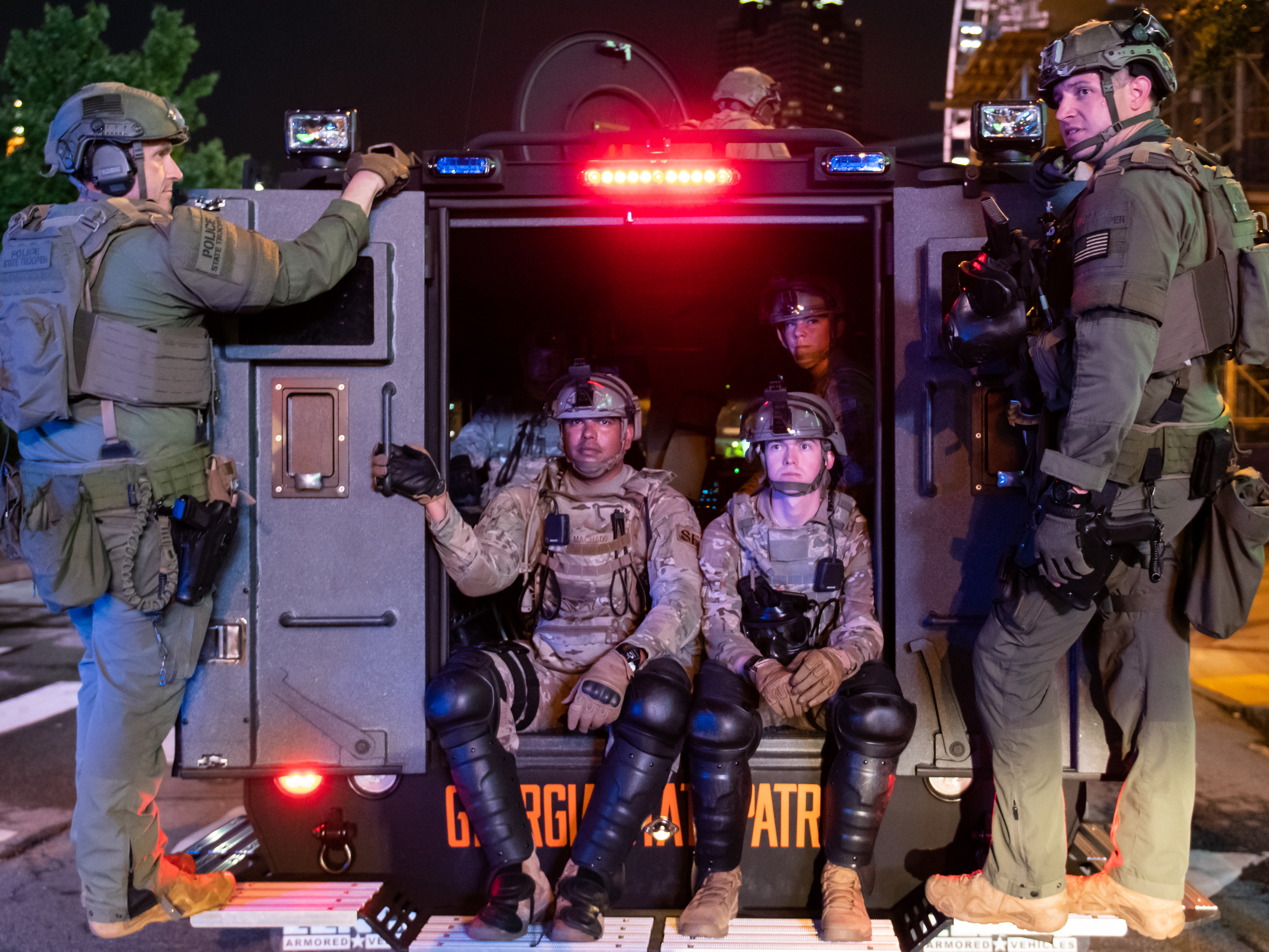
Top: National Guard soldiers in front of the CNN Center, June 4
Middle: National Guard soldiers assist SWAT team members enforcing a curfew
Bottom: National Guard and state troopers enforce a curfew, June 4

On the morning of June 4, Bernice King gave a speech at the King Center for Nonviolent Social Change where she urged the protesters to continue to protest against racial injustices, saying, "Don't stop until there is justice and equity for black and brown people, not just in these United States but all across the world in which that we live in." The gathering at the King Center ended with a march in honor of Floyd, whose funeral was scheduled for that same day. Later in the day, protesters met at Piedmont Park and marched to Centennial Olympic Park, while there was also a demonstration at Ponce City Market. For part of the protests, Mayor Bottoms marched with protesters in downtown. Earlier in the day, Mayor Bottoms spoke about the curfew and how, while there was no set deadline for removing the curfew, she was hopeful that the protests were becoming less violent. While some protesters remained around Centennial Olympic Park after the curfew, no tear gas was used by law enforcement and only six arrests were made that day.

==== June 5 ====
Several marches were held throughout Atlanta, including along Auburn Avenue, Tenth Street, and around Piedmont Park. No protesters were arrested, for the first day since the protesting started. Shortly before the 8 p.m. curfew, there was, according to the New York Post, an "impromptu dance party" that featured several National Guard soldiers in riot gear dancing to the song "Macarena".

==== June 6 ====
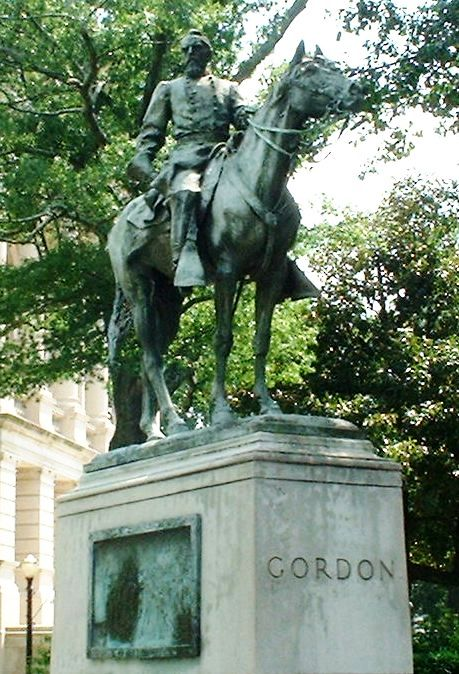
The equestrian statue of John Brown Gordon became a subject of protesting starting on June 6.

On June 6, Mayor Bottoms announced that the curfew for that night was called off due to there being no arrests the previous day. Earlier that morning, 10 people peacefully protested outside of Bottoms' home for about 30 minutes before leaving. Despite the lifted curfew, the crowds of protesters was notably smaller than in the previous days. Among the day's activities included a march from the King Center to Piedmont Park. Later that night, about 100 people protested outside of the capitol for the removal of the equestrian statue of John Brown Gordon that stood on the capitol grounds. Gordon was a previous governor of Georgia who had also served as a Confederate general in the American Civil War and is generally recognized as a leader in the Ku Klux Klan. The Atlanta Journal-Constitution called the statue "one of the most controversial monuments to the Old South on the Capitol grounds." Around 100 people protested at the capitol until about 11 pm, by which point the crowds had dispersed. Over the next several days, the statue became one of "the focus of protests", per the Georgia Recorder. Several days later, 44 descendants of Gordon sent a letter to Governor Kemp urging him to remove the statue.

==== June 7 ====
Several events were held throughout the metro Atlanta area, including at Atlantic Station and Ebenezer Baptist Church within the city proper. At about 1:30 pm, a group consisting of African American pastors led a march, called "Preachers for the People", along Auburn Avenue (by Big Bethel AME Church) to the capitol, singing protest songs along the way. They were joined by Jon Ossoff, who at the time was a candidate in the 2020–21 United States Senate election in Georgia. Around 3 pm, some protesters had gathered in Piedmont Park to begin a march through Midtown Atlanta in honor of Tony McDade, an African American transgender man who had been shot and killed by police on May 27. By 4 pm, the march had started near Grady High School. These protesters later held a moment of silence at the intersection of Tenth Street and Piedmont Road, considered the heart of Atlanta's gay neighborhood. At the same time, another group of protesters had assembled outside of the capitol. Shortly after 4 pm, a group of about 150 protesters marched through the campus of Georgia State University on their way from Woodruff Park to the capitol. Closer to 4:30 pm, another group marched from Cleopas R. Johnson Park to the city hall in honor of black women who had been killed by police. These protesters reached the city hall by about 5:30 pm, by which time sizable crowds had also formed around the capitol and the governor's mansion. This included several dozen who continued to call for the removal of Gordon's statue. Shortly after 7 pm, the protesters around the capitol took a knee and held a moment of silence for eight minutes 46 seconds. Then crowds marched throughout much of downtown Atlanta peacefully protesting. By shortly after 9 pm, much of the crowds had dispersed, and around 10:30 pm, an APD spokesperson said that no arrests had been made.

==== June 8 ====
By June 8, a barricade had been erected around the capitol. Also, the Peace Monument, a Civil War-related monument in Piedmont Park, was vandalized with the words "racist shame" spray painted on its pedestal.

==== June 11 ====
On June 11, a protester was arrested for shining a laser pointer at a helicopter. That same day, another protester was arrested and charged with a felony (interference with government property) for defacing the pedestal of the Gordon statue by writing "Tear Down" in chalk. A protest organizer, talking to the Associated Press, called the move by police excessive, saying, "Dude, it's chalk. Take a wet rag and wipe it off. She's in a walker. Surely there's better things to do with our resources. Per usual, the police response was 10 times more than what it needed to be." The arrest happened shortly after 6 pm.

==== June 12 ====
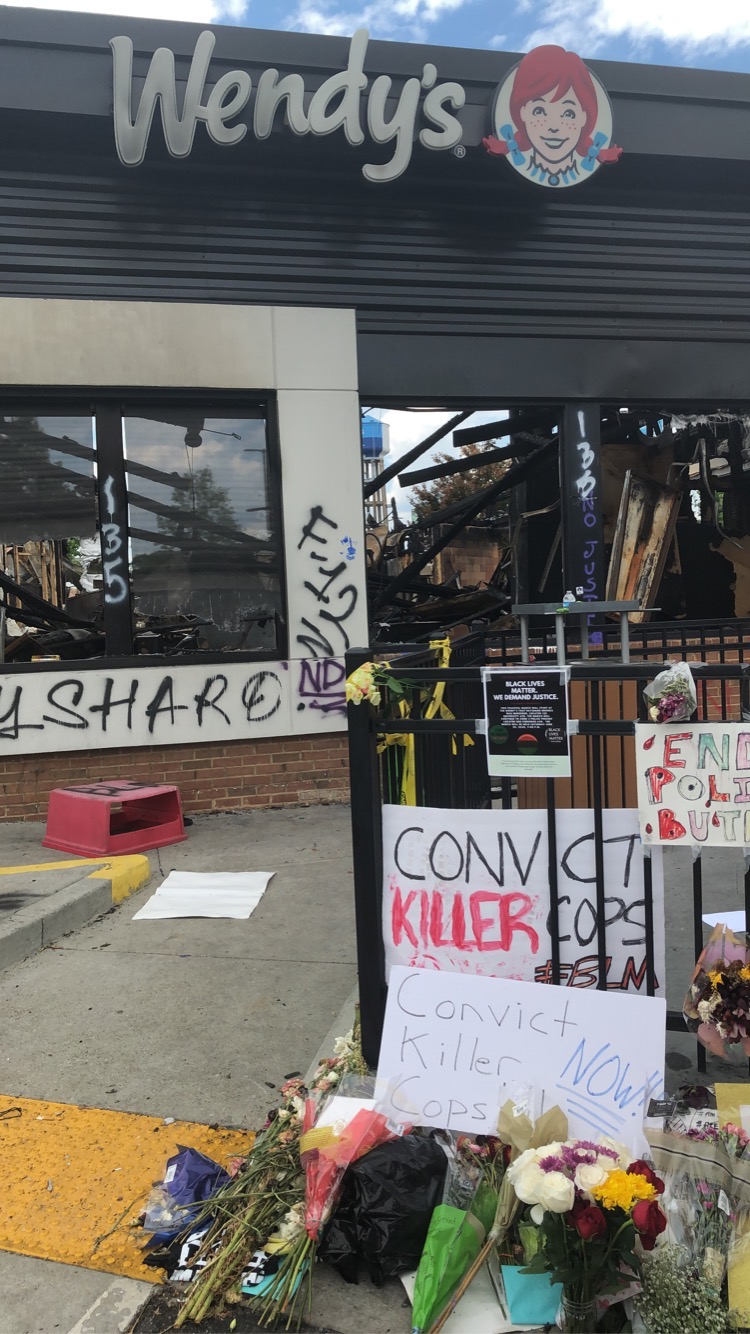
Memorial for Brooks at the site of his death, June 19

Around 10:30 pm, Rayshard Brooks, a 27-year-old African American man, was shot and killed by police following a brief struggle at a Wendy's in downtown Atlanta. The officer who shot Brooks was later fired.

==== June 13 ====
By the morning of June 13, several protesters had gathered near the Wendy's where Brooks was killed, with one protester calling the site "the new ground zero". A memorial was set up near the restaurant, with many leaving flowers at the site. Later that evening, Police Chief Shields announced that she was resigning from her position within APD. That same evening, protesters shut down the Interstate running through Atlanta; only one lane was reopened by 10 pm. Additional protesting occurred outside the a police precinct in the APD's Zone 3. Before 11 pm, a fire was started at the Wendy's that caused the entire building to be consumed. A spokesman for the Atlanta firefighters said it was not safe for them to get near the building to combat the blaze. Approximately 1,000 protesters had gathered at the Wendy's that day.

==== June 15 ====
Several thousand protesters marched from the Richard B. Russell Federal Building to the capitol after the legislature had reconvened following an earlier break due to the COVID-19 pandemic. The protesters sought to pressure the lawmakers into passing legislation addressing some of the issues they had been protesting, such as ending qualified immunity for police officers. The protest was organized by the NAACP.

==== June 17 ====
The officer who shot Brooks was officially charged with felony murder, among 10 other charges, by the District Attorney of Fulton County. In the two days following the charges being brought against the officer, about 170 APD officers called out sick in a blue flu protest. Speaking later about police morale, a spokesman for the International Brotherhood of Police Officers (which represented about 1,200 APD officers) said, "The morale is probably the worst it has ever been. [Mayor Bottoms] wanted to bow down to the rioters and possibly get rid of good cops."

==== June 19 ====
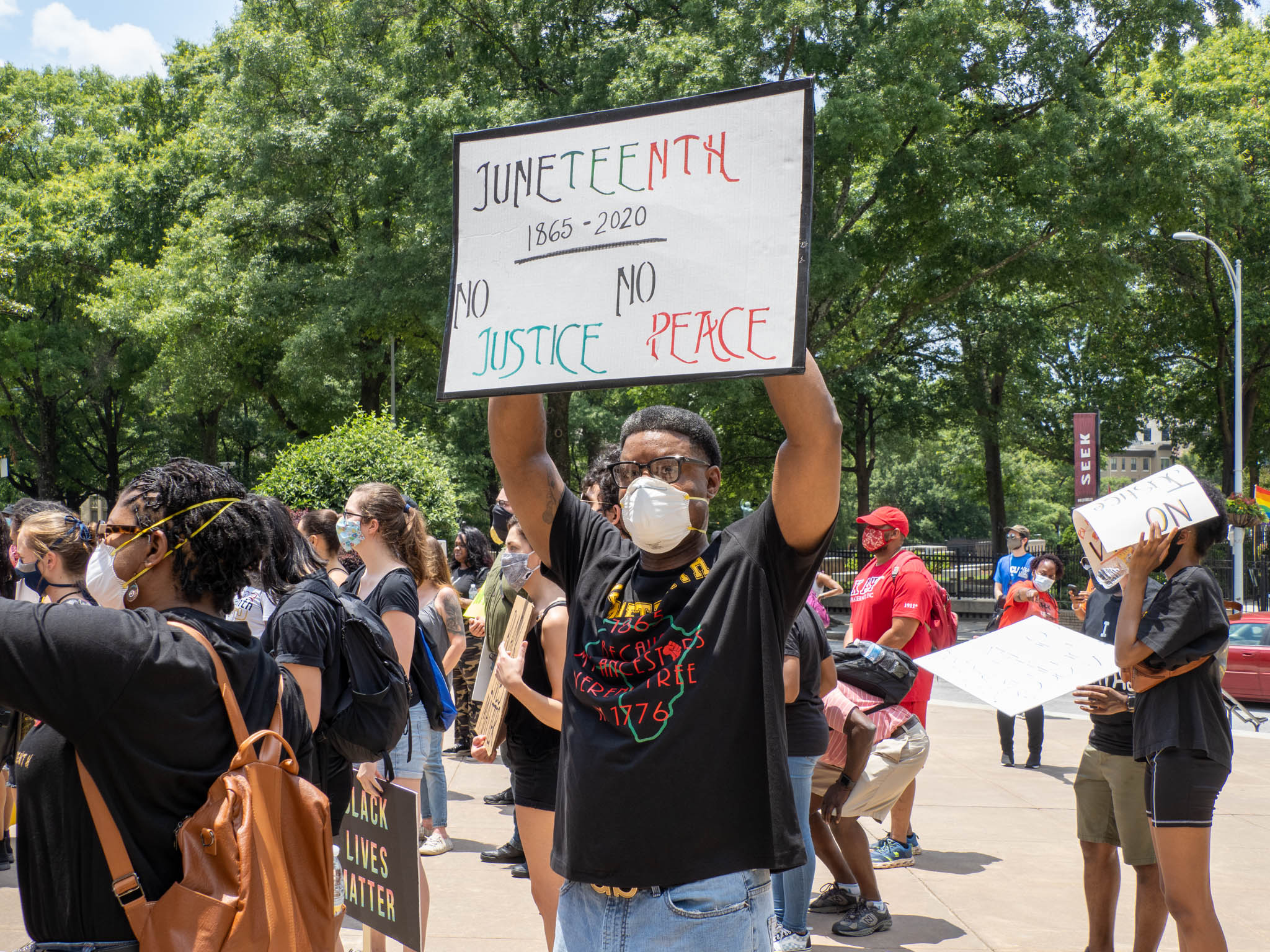
Protesters outside the capitol on Juneteenth

On the 155th Juneteenth, over a dozen events were held throughout the city. Around 9 am, a march was held with about 500 protesters that started at Centennial Olympic Park, while other rallies were held near the place of Brooks' death, Atlanta City Hall, the headquarters for the APD, and along Marietta Street, among other places. At the city hall, over 50 protesters chanted "care not cages" and "Black lives matter" while holding signs saying "defund APD". Later that night, at a protest held near the burned Wendy's, one protester was shot in the leg after someone fired several shots around the protest.

==== June 23 ====
Brooks' funeral was held in a ceremony at Ebenezer Baptist Church with several notable individuals in attendance, such as Bernice King, T.I., Mayor Bottoms, former gubernatorial candidate Stacey Abrams, and the Reverend Raphael Warnock. The event had 200 attendees, limited due to the COVID-19 pandemic, with filmmaker Tyler Perry covering the costs.

=== April 2021 ===
On April 16, a protest march was held in northeast Atlanta, starting at the Old Fourth Ward Park, following the killing of Daunte Wright. On April 20, many people marched in the streets following a guilty verdict in the trial of Derek Chauvin.
