= Fernando Alfonso III =

American journalist and editor

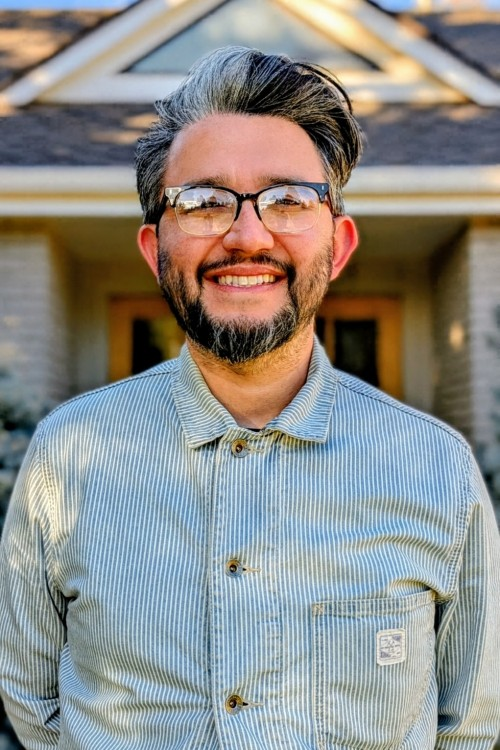
- Born: Fernando Alfonso III
- Education: University of Connecticut (BA); Syracuse University (MA)
- Occupations: Journalist, editor
- Employer(s): NPR; CNN; Houston Chronicle; The New York Times

Fernando Alfonso III is an American journalist and news editor. He reported on breaking news at CNN, and has held senior editorial positions NPR, the Houston Chronicle, and The New York Times.

== Early life and education ==
Alfonso grew up in the Hudson Valley region of New York. He earned a Bachelor of Arts in English from the University of Connecticut and a Master of Arts in Magazine, Newspaper and Online Journalism from the S.I. Newhouse School of Public Communications at Syracuse University.

== Career ==
=== Early journalism ===
Alfonso began his career working for newspapers and digital news outlets, including The Daily Dot, where he covered internet culture and digital communities. His work and commentary on emerging online media trends have been cited internationally, including in Germany’s Der Spiegel.

=== CNN ===
Alfonso later joined CNN’s digital breaking news team, where he reported on major national events. During the 2020 George Floyd protests in Atlanta, Alfonso documented demonstrations and damage to the CNN Center headquarters, publishing real-time updates from the scene. His reporting was widely circulated and referenced by national and international media outlets.

=== NPR ===
Alfonso joined NPR as a senior supervising editor, overseeing NewsHub, the organization’s digital news desk responsible for NPR.org and coordination with member stations on breaking news and national coverage.

=== Houston Chronicle ===
In May 2024, Alfonso was named Managing Editor of News and Content Development at the Houston Chronicle. In that role, he oversaw daily news operations across multiple desks, including metro, government, education, business, and sports coverage.

Earlier in his career at the Houston Chronicle, Alfonso was part of the newsroom staff recognized for its coverage of Hurricane Harvey.

=== The New York Times ===
Alfonso was later named to The New York Times leadership team as part of its expansion of national reporting operations in Texas, contributing to the newspaper’s regional coverage strategy.

== Teaching ==
In addition to newsroom work, Alfonso has taught journalism and media studies at several institutions, including Morehouse College, Kennesaw State University, and the University of Kentucky.

== Recognition ==
- As a member of the Houston Chronicle staff, Alfonso was part of the team named a finalist for the Pulitzer Prize for Breaking News Reporting for coverage of Hurricane Harvey.
- Alfonso’s eyewitness reporting from the CNN Center during the 2020 George Floyd protests in Atlanta was cited and entered into the official Congressional Record during a hearing of the United States House Committee on the Judiciary.
- His reporting from CNN’s Atlanta headquarters during the protests was widely circulated by national and international media outlets.
- Alfonso has been recognized by academic institutions and public media organizations for newsroom leadership and mentorship, including alumni recognition from the University of Connecticut.
