= Erika Shields =

Former Chief of Police Atlanta

Commissioner of the Buffalo Police Department
- Incumbent
- Assumed office May 4th, 2026

Chief of the Louisville Metro Police Department
- In office January 19, 2021 – January 02, 2023
- Mayor: Greg Fischer
- Preceded by: Yvette Gentry
- Succeeded by: Jacquelyn Gwinn-Villaroel

24th Atlanta Chief of Police
- In office December 28, 2016 – June 13, 2020
- Mayors: Kasim Reed; Keisha Lance Bottoms
- Preceded by: George N. Turner
- Succeeded by: Rodney Bryant

Personal details
- Education: Webster University (BA); Saint Leo University (MS)

Erika Shields is an American law enforcement officer who, as of 2026, serves as the Commissioner of the Buffalo Police Department. She previously served as the chief of police of the Louisville Metro Police Department from January 2021 to January 2023. She was previously the 24th chief of police of the Atlanta Police Department from 2016 to 2020.

== Early life and education ==
Shields is a native of Morris, New York. She earned a Bachelor of Arts degree in international studies from Webster University and a master's degree in criminal justice from Saint Leo University.

== Career ==
Before joining the Atlanta Police Department as a patrol officer in 1995, Chief Shields worked as a stockbroker in Boston. She was the second woman to lead the Atlanta Police Department, and the first openly gay person to do so.

On December 1, 2016, Atlanta Mayor Kasim Reed announced that he had selected Shields to succeed Chief George N. Turner, who was retiring.

In May 2020, amid protests in Atlanta in response to the murder of George Floyd, Shields said that the angry reaction was understandable, and that the value of the lives of black people was being diminished by police or other individuals, stating that such events were a "recurring narrative". She added with some suggestions on how police could do better, namely better training and "weeding out bad cops", and praised the use of body-worn cameras. Shields addressed demonstrators stating that she was happy to allow protests so long as they did not violate laws. She stated her opposition to using force to halt the protests, stating that protestors have a right "to be upset, to be scared, and to want to yell".

On June 13, 2020, Shields resigned after a video went viral of an officer fatally shooting a black man, Rayshard Brooks. During his arrest for DUI, Brooks wrestled officers, grabbed a taser, and aimed it at the pursuing officers.

In January 2021, she joined the Louisville Metro Police Department.

In June 2023, she joined Georgia-based provider of training tools for law-enforcement agencies InVeris as Chief Commercial Officer (CCO).

On April 6, 2026, Mayor Sean Ryan of Buffalo, New York, announced the appointment of Erika Shields as Commissioner of the Buffalo Police Department. Shields assumed the role in May 2026 after being confirmed by the Buffalo Common Council.
