= George N. Turner =

American police chief

23rd Atlanta Chief of Police
- In office January 4, 2010 – December 28, 2016
- Mayor: Kasim Reed
- Preceded by: Richard Pennington
- Succeeded by: Erika Shields

George N. Turner was the 23rd Chief of Police for the City of Atlanta, Georgia, US. Turner assumed the position as interim chief on January 4, 2010, having been appointed by newly inaugurated Mayor Kasim Reed due to the resignation of Richard Pennington shortly after the Atlanta Eagle police raid. Turner became the permanent police chief on July 9, 2010.

Turner began his career with the Atlanta Police Department in 1981.

In December 2016, Turner announced his retirement. Mayor Reed chose Deputy Chief, Erika Shields as his successor. Shields became chief on December 28, 2016.

== Education ==
Turner was educated in the Atlanta public school system. He has a bachelor's degree from Saint Leo University and a Master of Public Administration degree from Columbus State University.
