= Herbert Jenkins =

Herbert Jenkins may refer to:

- Herbert George Jenkins (1876–1923), British writer and the owner of the publishing company Herbert Jenkins Ltd.
- Herbert Jenkins Ltd, British publishing company that merged to become Barrie & Jenkins
- Herbert Turner Jenkins (1907–1990), police chief of Atlanta
