= Rodney Bryant =

American law enforcement officer

Atlanta Chief of Police
- In office June 13, 2020 – June 2, 2022
- Mayor: Keisha Lance Bottoms, Andre Dickens
- Preceded by: Erika Shields
- Succeeded by: Darin Schierbaum

Personal details
- Education: Georgia State University (BS); Central Michigan University (MS)

Rodney Bryant is an American law enforcement officer who served as Chief of Police of Atlanta from June 13, 2020, until June 2, 2022.

== Education ==
Bryant earned a Bachelor of Science degree in criminal justice from Georgia State University and a Master of Science in administration from Central Michigan University.

== Career ==
Before attending college, Bryant joined the Atlanta Police Department in 1988 as a peace officer. After earning his bachelor's and master's degree, Bryant served as Police Executive Commander in the City of Atlanta. He was named Assistant Chief of Police in 2017. He was named Sergeant-at-Arms for the National Organization of Black Law Enforcement Executives in 2016.

Bryant became the interim Chief of Police at the request of Mayor Keisha Lance Bottoms, following the resignation of Erika Shields, who left her position after the killing of Rayshard Brooks in June 2020. On May 4, 2021, he was appointed chief on a permanent basis.
