= Commission on Accreditation for Law Enforcement Agencies =

American authority on public safety

Commission on Accreditation for Law Enforcement Agencies, Inc.
- Formation: 1979
- Purpose: Accreditation
- Headquarters: Gainesville, Virginia
- Location(s): United States; Canada; Mexico
- Region served: Worldwide
- Members: Public Safety Agencies
- President: W. Craig Hartley Jr.
- Parent organization: IACP; NOBLE; NSA; PERF
- Website: www.calea.org

The Commission on Accreditation for Law Enforcement Agencies, Inc. (CALEA) is a credentialing authority (accreditation), based in the United States, whose primary mission is to accredit public safety agencies, namely law enforcement agencies, training academies, communications centers, and campus public safety agencies.

== Creation ==
The Commission was created in 1979 as an independent accrediting authority by the four major law enforcement membership associations:

- International Association of Chiefs of Police (IACP)
- National Organization of Black Law Enforcement Executives (NOBLE)
- National Sheriffs' Association (NSA)
- Police Executive Research Forum (PERF)

== Purpose and authority of the Commission ==
The primary purpose of the Commission is to improve law enforcement service by creating a national body of standards developed by law enforcement professionals. Furthermore, it recognizes professional achievements by establishing and administering an accreditation process through which a law enforcement agency can demonstrate that it meets those standards. CALEA derives its general authority from the four major law enforcement membership associations whose members represent approximately 80% of the law enforcement profession in the United States.

== Commissioners ==
Members of the Commission are appointed by the Executive Directors of these four associations. A majority vote is required for each appointment. Commissioners are appointed to a term of three years.

The Commission is composed of 21 members:

- 11 members are selected from law enforcement
- 10 members are selected from the public and private sectors.

== See also ==
- Florida Criminal Justice Standards & Training Commission

== Sources ==
- "The Commission on Accreditation for Law Enforcement Agencies (CALEA)".
