= Beverly Harvard =

American law enforcement officer

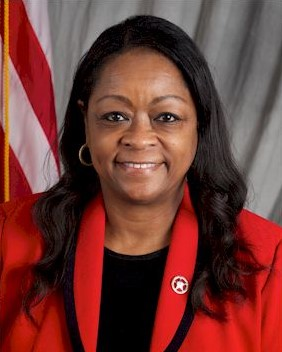

Atlanta Chief of Police
- In office 1994–2002
- Mayor: Bill Campbell
- Preceded by: Eldrin Bell
- Succeeded by: Richard Pennington

United States Marshal for the Northern District of Georgia
- In office 2010–2019
- President: Barack Obama; Donald Trump
- Preceded by: Richard Mecum
- Succeeded by: Michael Yeager

Personal details
- Born: Beverly Joyce Bailey; December 22, 1950 (age 75) Macon, Georgia, U.S.
- Education: Morris Brown College (BA); Georgia State University (MS)

Beverly Joyce Bailey Harvard (born December 22, 1950) is a former police chief of Atlanta, Georgia, and the first black female police chief of a major city in the United States.

== Early life and education ==
Beverly Joyce Bailey was born in Macon, Georgia, on December 22, 1950, the youngest of seven children. She graduated from Ballard-Hudson High School, where she was a majorette captain in the marching band and participated in drama club and choir. She went on to attend Morris Brown College in Atlanta, graduating with a Bachelor of Arts in sociology at age 22.

== Career ==
In 1973, her husband, Jimmy, and one of his friends bet her $100 that she could not become a police officer. She accepted the bet and, later that year, was hired as an officer in the Atlanta Police Department. After completing her police academy training, she spent several years performing night foot patrols in high-crime areas. In 1979, she was promoted to affirmative action specialist and then to director of public affairs in 1980, where she handled media inquiries regarding the Atlanta child murders. Her performance handling the media resulted in a promotion to deputy police chief in 1982. Harvard graduated from the FBI National Academy in 1983.

Harvard was offered the position of Atlanta Chief of Police in 1994 and was officially confirmed by the city council on October 26, 1994, becoming the first black woman to be a police chief of any major city in the United States. During her tenure as police chief, she dealt with several high-profile incidents, including a corruption scandal, Freaknik, the 1996 Centennial Olympic Park bombing, and the 1997 Otherside Lounge bombing. She chose not to reapply for the position in 2002, instead choosing to become the Deputy Federal Security Director for the Transportation Security Administration at Hartsfield–Jackson Atlanta International Airport.

In 2010, Harvard was nominated by President Barack Obama to become the United States Marshal for the Northern District of Georgia, a position that she held until 2019.

== See also ==
- Penny Harrington
- Marguerite P. Justice
- Georgia Ann Robinson
