= National Organization of Black Law Enforcement Executives =

National Organization of Black Law Enforcement Executives logo

The National Organization of Black Law Enforcement Executives (NOBLE) is a membership group of primarily black law enforcement CEOs and command level officials in local, state, county, and federal government. Headquartered in Washington, DC, it has 57 chapters in the United States, one in St. Kitts & Nevis and one in the United Kingdom.

== Goals ==
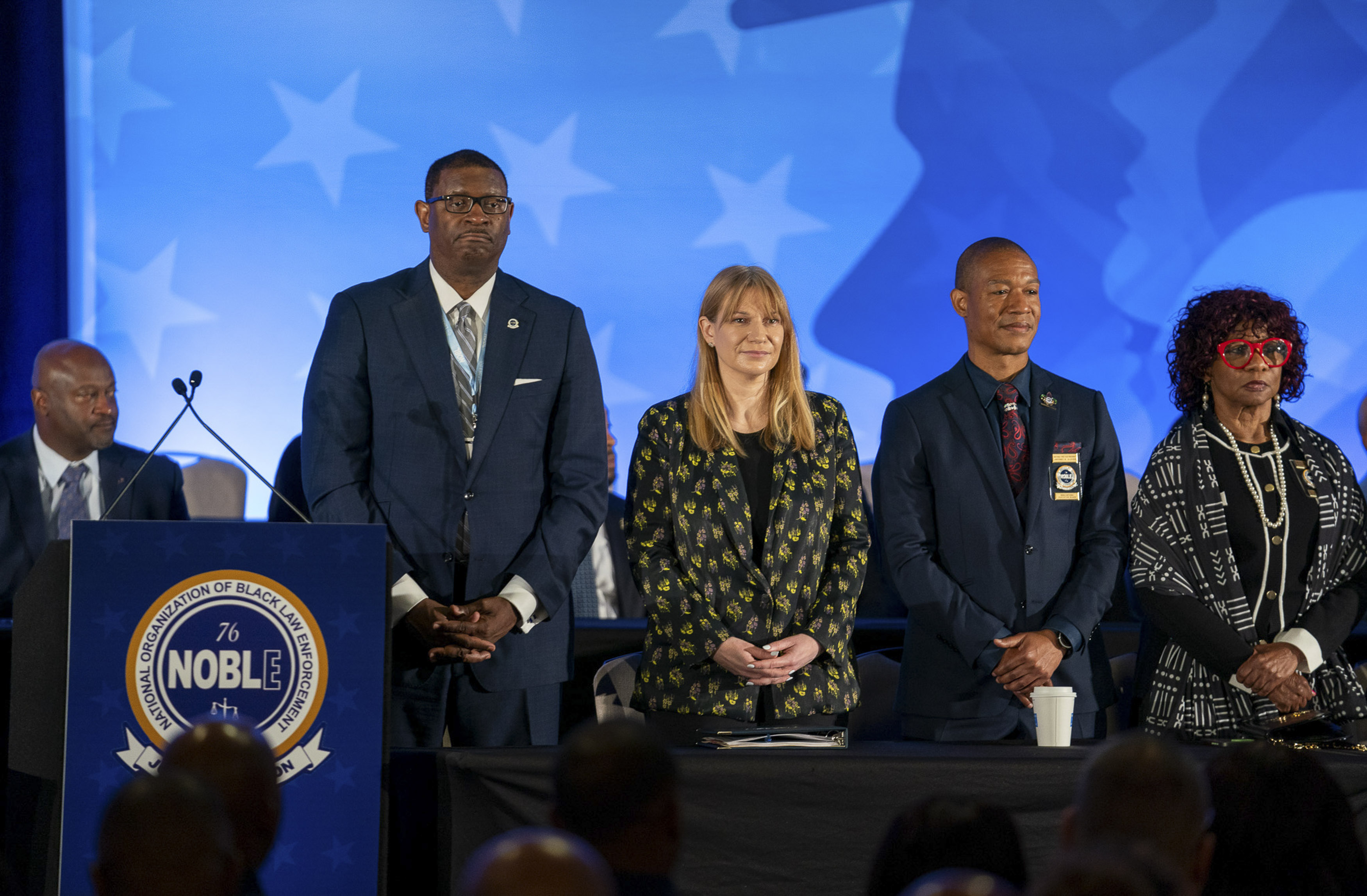
NOBLE Conference in 2024

The goal of NOBLE is to be recognized as a highly competent public service organization that is at the forefront of providing solutions to law enforcement issues and concerns, as well as to the ever-changing needs of African-American communities.

== History ==
The organization was founded in 1976, during a three-day symposium to address crime in urban low income areas. The symposium was attended by 60 top-ranking black law enforcement executives from 24 states and 55 major cities. They exchanged views about the high rate of crime in black urban communities and the socioeconomic conditions that lead to crime and violence, as well as relevant issues such as fairness in the administration of justice (or the lack thereof), strained police/community relations, the hiring and promotion of black police officers, and the unique problems faced by black police executives and black police officers in general. Recognizing that black law enforcement executives could more effectively impact the criminal justice system through a unified voice, the symposium participants departed from the planned agenda to create NOBLE. One of the original founders of NOBLE was former NYPD Chief of Patrol William R. Bracey.

== Notable members ==
- Dr. Theron L. Bowman, CALEA Board of Commissioners
- Mr. Thomas H. Warren, Sr., CALEA Board of Commissioners
- Cedric Alexander, former president of the NOBLE
- Rodney Bryant, Sergeant-At-Arms

== See also ==
- Law enforcement in the United States
  - Commission on Accreditation for Law Enforcement Agencies
