= List of police chiefs of Atlanta =

There have been many police chiefs of the Atlanta Police Department in the history of Atlanta, Georgia United States. The city shifted from a rural, Marshal/Deputy Marshal model in 1873.

The current police chief is Darin Schierbaum.

The city conducted a nationwide search for a permanent chief. Schierbaum succeeded former police chief Rodney N. Bryant. Bryant took the helm after former chief Erika Shields resigned following the killing of Rayshard Brooks. Bryant served as interim police chief until the city named him as chief in June 2020. Chief Schierbaum joined the Atlanta Police Department in 2002, was appointed interim chief in June 2022, and chief in October 2022.

Name	Date appointed	Force size	Budget
Thomas Jones	July 1873	26	
James A. Anderson	January 1876	33	
L. P. Thomas	April 1, 1878	33	
Lovice T. Anderson	April 14, 1880	37	
Arthur B. Connolly	April 1881	45	
W. P. Manley	August 20, 1897	171	
John W. Ball	March 30, 1901	178	
Henry Jennings	March 30, 1905	196	
James Beavers	August 11, 1911	254	
W. M. Mayes	August 3, 1915	267	
James Beavers	November 8, 1917	283	
E. L. Jett (acting)	February 15, 1924	339	
James Beavers	May 19, 1926	386	
T. O. Sturdivant	April 30, 1932	408	$779,145
M. A. Hornsby	February 1, 1937	461	$973,264
Herbert Turner Jenkins	February 2, 1947	526	$1,564,010
John F. Inman	March 20, 1972	1,508	$16,195,775
A. Reginald Eaves	1974		
Lee P. Brown	1978		
George Napper	1978		
Morris Redding	1982		
Eldrin Bell	1990		
Beverly Harvard	1994		
Richard Pennington	2002	1,639	$172,418,028
George N. Turner	January 4, 2010	1,639	
Erika Shields	December 28, 2016	1,700+	$204,754,624
Rodney Bryant	June 13, 2020	1,603	$248,508,775
Darin Schierbaum	June 2, 2022 (interim chief); October 31, 2022 (chief)	1,500+	$228,240,976

== See also ==
- Georgia State Patrol
