= Herbert Turner Jenkins =

American law enforcer

- Born: June 7, 1907; Lithonia, Georgia, U.S.
- Died: July 20, 1990 (aged 83)
- Known for: Longest-serving police chief of Atlanta
- Police career
- Department: Atlanta Police Department
- Rank: Police Chief

Herbert Turner Jenkins (June 7, 1907 – July 20, 1990) was an American law enforcement official and the longest-serving police chief of Atlanta.

== Early life ==
Herbert Turner Jenkins was born on June 7, 1907, in Lithonia, Georgia, to police officer Gordon Alexander Jenkins (1886-1932) and his wife Jane "Jennie" Elliott Jenkins (1888-1978). Jenkins moved to Atlanta in 1924 to work in its first automotive dealership.

== Career ==
He joined the Atlanta Police Department in 1932 and was made chief in 1947. He served as chief for 25 years until retiring in 1972 shepherding the city through racial strife during the desegregation of public transportation, public schools and parks. Fully backed by Mayor William Hartsfield, he was able to bring all parties to the table helping Atlanta progress mostly peacefully through straits that crippled other Southern cities.

After retiring, he became a researcher at Emory University and authored books about Atlanta history.

== Personal life and death ==
His wife, Marguerite "Margie" Mason Jenkins, died in 1987, and Jenkins died by suicide three years later. He was buried next to his wife at the Rockbridge Baptist Church cemetery in Norcross, Georgia, and survived by two sons.

== See also ==
- List of Police Chiefs of Atlanta

== Bibliography ==
- Keeping the Peace
- Forty Years on the Force (1932–1972)
- Atlanta and the Automobile (1977)
