= George Floyd protests in Georgia =

2020 civil unrest after the murder of George Floyd

- Part of George Floyd protests
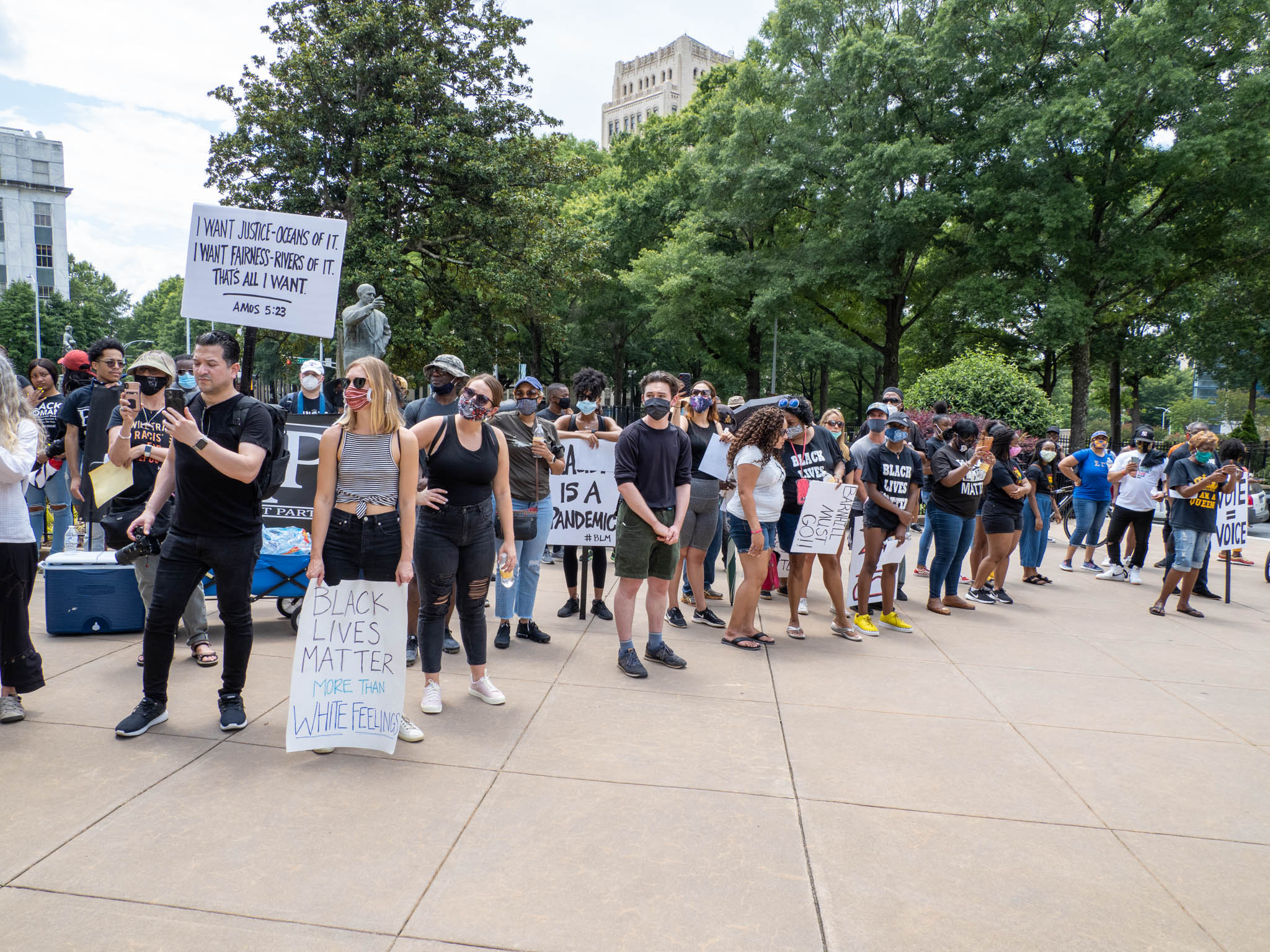
- Protesters in Atlanta on June 19, 2020 (Juneteenth)
- Date: May 28, 2020 – April 2021
- Location: Georgia, United States
- Caused by: Police brutality; Institutional racism against African Americans; Reaction to the murder of George Floyd; Economic, racial and social inequality

Cities in Georgia in which a protest with about 100 or more participants was held

A series of George Floyd protests took place in Georgia, United States, following the murder of George Floyd in 2020. 11 consecutive days of protests and rallies occurred in Atlanta through June 8, 2020. Through July 2020, protests occurred in twenty various cities and communities in the state.

Governor Brian Kemp announced on May 31 that he had authorized 3,000 National Guard troops ready to be deployed to cities across the state.

== Locations ==
=== Albany ===
On May 30, about 40 or 50 protesters peaceably demonstrated with signs and chants. They lined up along Slappey Boulevard on a vacant lot, where they were joined by local officials and supplied with bottled water by Albany police.

=== Athens ===
Protesters blocked Broad Street starting around lunchtime on May 29 at the University of Georgia. On May 31, several hundred protesters marched through downtown for several hours ending at the Arch. At 9:45 PM local police flew a drone over the crowd to announce a 9 PM curfew. By midnight, a group of 100 had not left, and police subsequently fired tear gas and rubber bullets to disperse the crowd, then arrested those who remained.

=== Atlanta ===
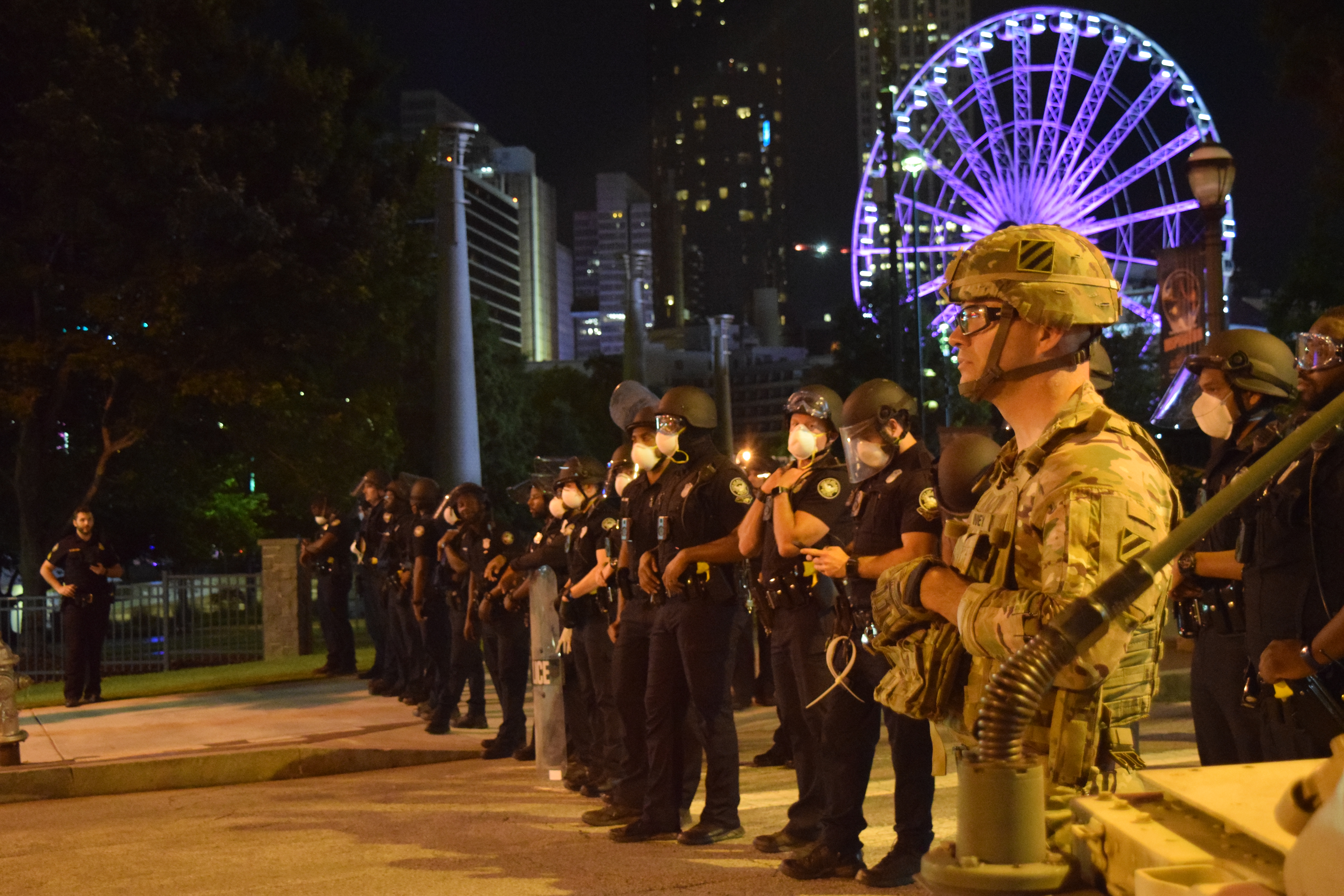
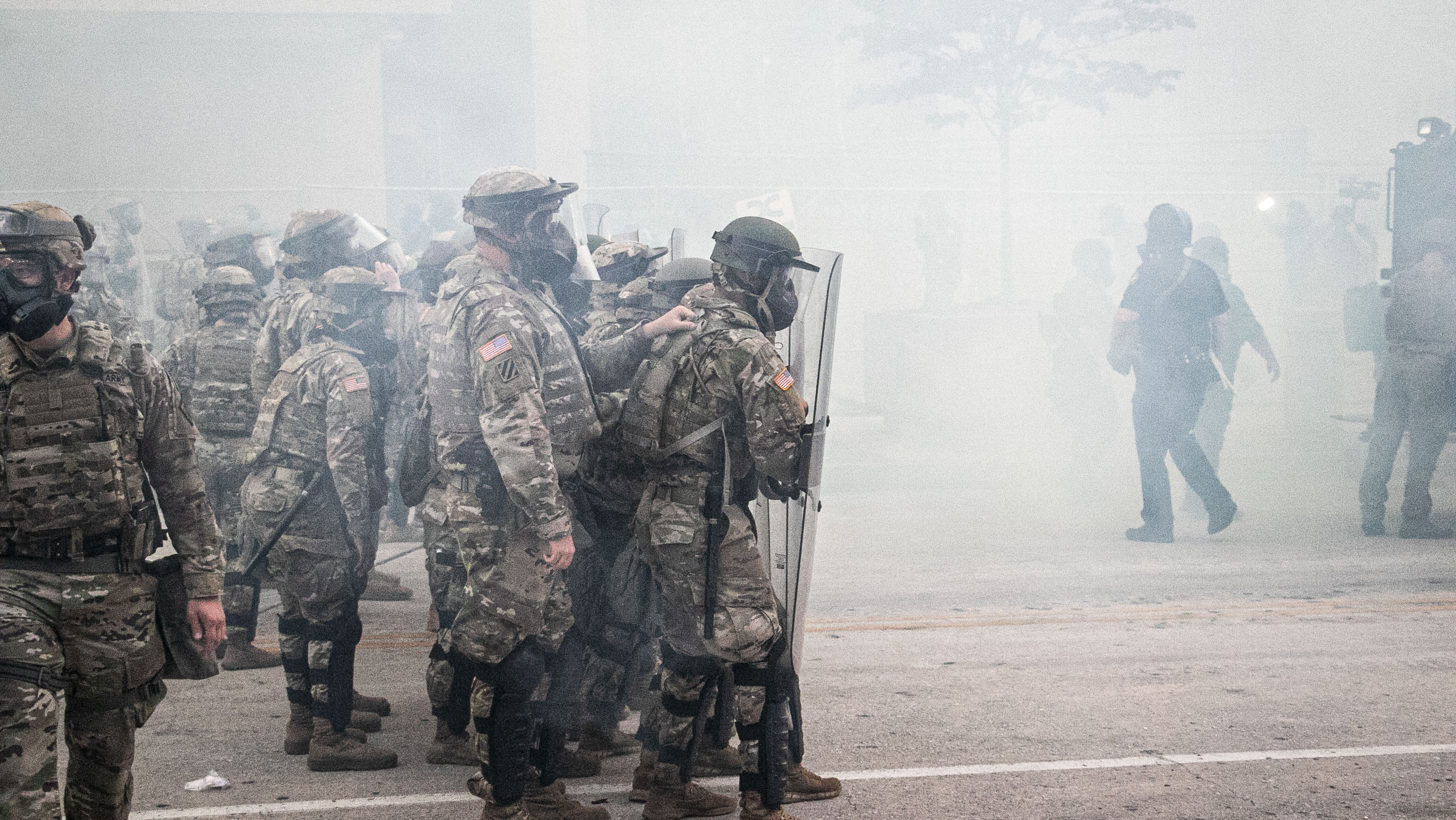
Atlanta Police Department and the Army National Guard's 48th Infantry Brigade Combat Team on the night of May 30 (top); National Guard and protesters at the Governor's Mansion on May 30 (middle); Police and National Guard at Centennial Olympic Park on May 31 (bottom)

A peaceful march occurred on May 29 at Centennial Olympic Park and was attended by hundreds. At around noon, protesters marched to the CNN Center, which was vandalized by protesters starting a few minutes later. Some protesters vandalized the CNN logo at the entrance, broke the doors and windows, and began throwing objects at police officers in the lobby starting around 9:00 p.m. They were dispersed in a few hours and never entered any further than the lobby. The windows and doors were boarded up, and the sign was repainted the next morning. Later, a fence was put up to ward off protesters. As tensions between protesters and police escalated, police began using tear gas. Protesters threw water bottles, eggs, and other objects at officers, burned police cars, and defaced businesses. The College Football Hall of Fame's gift shop was looted; Hall of Fame CEO Kimberly Beaudin told ESPN that "no artifacts or displays were damaged." Three officers were injured in the clashes, including one who was run over by an ATV.

At midnight, Governor Brian Kemp declared a state of emergency in Fulton County and authorized 500 National Guard members to aid law enforcement in the city. Mayor Keisha Lance Bottoms and rapper and activist Killer Mike decried the riots. By Saturday, May 30 at 5:30, 71 arrests had been made in Atlanta, and one demonstrator was reported shot.

Also on May 30, after initially ordering two black college students to continue driving their car, Atlanta police pulled them from their car, broke a car window, and used Tasers to shock them. Within days, six officers were charged as a result of the incident; two were fired and four were put on administrative leave. The Fulton County District Attorney, Paul Howard, stated that the two college students were "innocent almost to the point of being naive".

On June 3, APD reported that 425 protesters were arrested between May 29 and June 1. Of those arrested, 51 people (~12%) were not from Georgia.

On June 13, after the police killed Rayshard Brooks the night before, protesters clashed with police and burned down the Wendy's where Brooks was killed.

On July 4, 2020, a "predominantly Black group of heavily armed protesters" rallied at Stone Mountain Park, the birthplace of the modern Ku Klux Klan, calling for the removal of a large rock relief on the mountain's north face that has been described by the president of the Atlanta chapter of the NAACP as "the largest shrine to white supremacy in the history of the world". A spokesperson for the Stone Mountain Memorial Association stated that "the protesters were peaceful and orderly".

=== Augusta ===
On May 30, about 60 people marched on Wrightsboro Road. The event was organized on Facebook. On May 31, hundreds of demonstrators marched down Washington Road chanting and holding signs. Richmond County Sheriff Richard Roundtree spoke and deputies marched with the group. On June 6, 2,000 demonstrators marched through Downtown Augusta chanting and holding up signs that said "Black Lives Matter". Augusta-Richmond County Mayor Hardie Davis spoke to demonstrators at the Augusta Riverwalk and expressed how happy he was that the protests in Augusta were peaceful and he said "We will get change". Ahmaud Arbery's mother, Wanda Cooper-Jones was a special guest and one of few who spoke to protesters about the murders of Ahmaud Arbery, George Floyd, and the shooting of Breonna Taylor and how they are smiling down from heaven knowing there will be change.

=== Avondale Estates ===
Organizers counted over 800 people in attendance at a protest against police brutality and in support of Black Lives Matter. Protesters lined the sidewalk from North Clarendon to Sam's Crossing holding signs, while many drivers in passing honked their horns in support.

=== Carrollton ===
Over 100 protesters demonstrated peacefully in Adamson Square on Sunday, May 31. A second peaceful protest was organized for Monday, June 1 by University of West Georgia students and attracted hundreds of participants.

On June 7, one week after the first protest, demonstrators again gathered in Adamson Square. The protesters marched to Courthouse Park to stand in front of the Reverend Dr. Martin Luther King Jr. Monument, erected in January 2020, and next to the Carroll County Confederate Monument, erected in April 1910.

=== Cartersville ===
About 200 protesters demonstrated peacefully on the steps of the Bartow County Courthouse for an hour on Saturday, May 30. Some stayed afterwards to pick up litter from the courthouse grounds.

=== Columbus ===
Over 200 protesters walked peacefully along Broadway through downtown Columbus on Sunday afternoon, May 31, with a police escort under the supervision of the mayor and the county sheriff. After the march ended about 3 p.m., some protesters regrouped and walked up 13th Street, blocking traffic; 22 of them were arrested for failing to disperse, a misdemeanor.

=== Cumming ===
About 900 protesters peacefully gathered around the old Forsyth County Courthouse on June 6. While there were concerns that white supremacists from the Nationalist Movement were planning to disrupt the event, this did not come to fruition.

=== Dacula ===
On June 4, approximately 500 protesters rallied at Hamilton Mill, showing their support for Black Lives Matter and protesting the murder of George Floyd. They marched from Hamilton Mill to Duncan Creek Park, displaying signs of George Floyd, among others, while chanting his name.

=== Dalton ===
On Monday, June 1, several dozen demonstrators marched peacefully, escorted by city police, from Harmon Field to the Whitfield County Courthouse and then to City Hall.

=== Decatur ===
On Wednesday, June 3, hundreds of predominantly white protesters gathered in a spontaneous protest and angrily chanted and pumped their fists in outrage over the murder of George Floyd and police brutality as a whole. The protesters chanted "black lives matter," "I can't breathe," and "no justice, no peace." They later listened to young black men and women speak through a loudspeaker about police brutality toward the black community. A few well armed Black Panthers were also present at the scene, but were friendly and neither protesters nor the patrolling DeKalb County marshals seemed perturbed by their presence. While the protest was deemed to be spontaneous, the crowd may have gathered due to social media posts attributed to 19 year old Decatur High School graduate Chaléah Head.

=== Fayetteville ===
On June 6, approximately 2,000 protesters marched to city hall. The protests were reportedly the largest in Fayetteville's history.

=== Gainesville ===
Several hundred people protested in downtown Gainesville on May 31.

=== Grovetown ===
On June 6, approximately 50 people peacefully marched through the streets and around city hall in support of Black Lives Matter. They held a moment of silence for George Floyd and were guided by local police officers.

=== Hamilton ===
A peaceful protest was held on June 15, 2020. In early 2021 Hamilton's police chief and a patrolman resigned after footage emerged of them using racial slurs and making lewd comments while having a conversation during the protest.

=== Hinesville ===
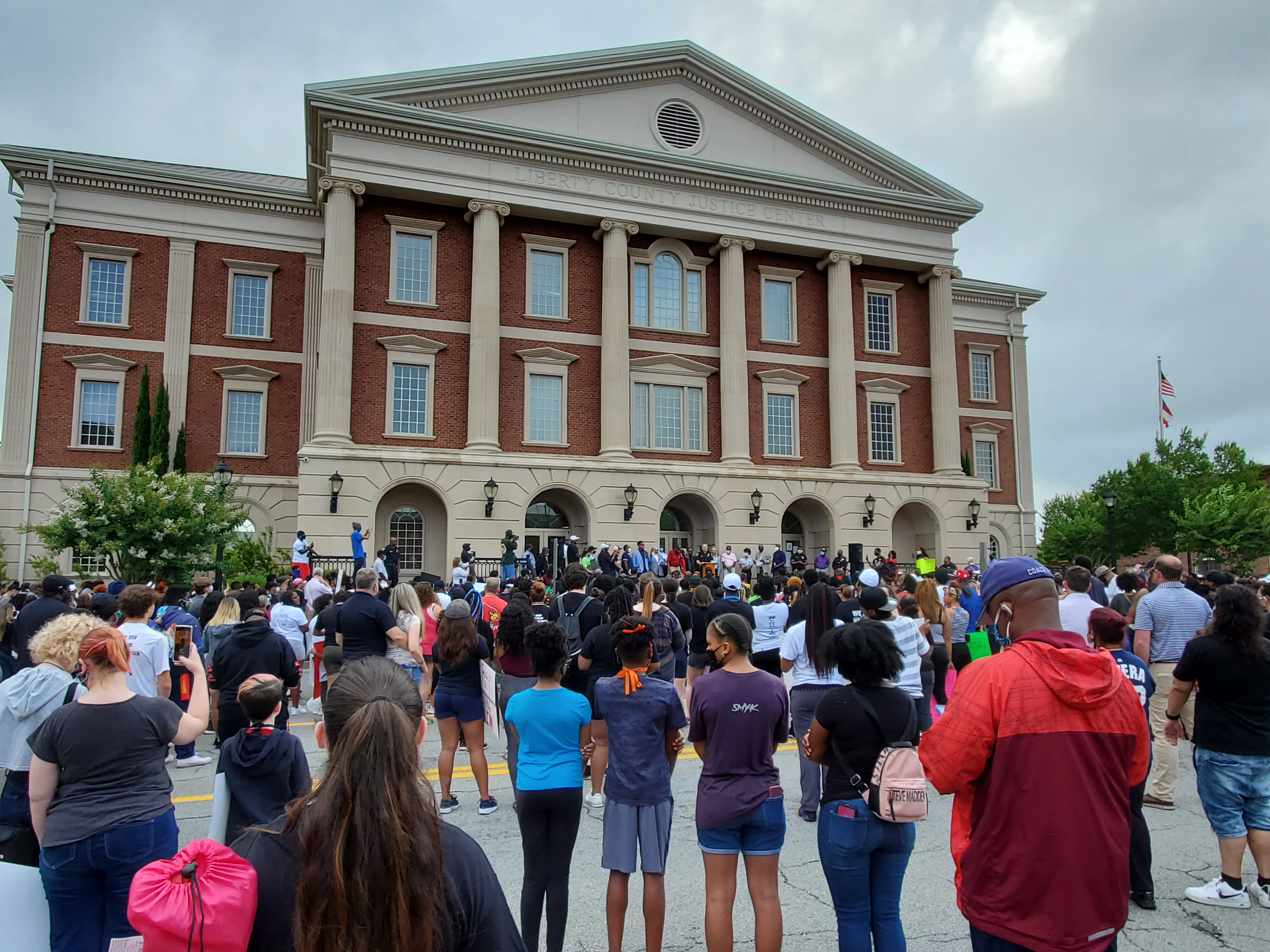
Protesters outside the Liberty County Justice Center in Hinesville, Georgia

On Thursday, June 4, hundreds of protesters marched in a peaceful protest that included speeches from Congressman Buddy Carter and State Representative Al Williams.

=== Kennesaw ===
Over 100 protesters rallied on campus at Kennesaw State University and marched to downtown Kennesaw on June 1. Protesters met with Kennesaw Police and peacefully discussed their concerns.

=== Louisville ===
Hundreds of protesters gathered in downtown Louisville, Georgia to demand social justice on June 13. They also demanded the removal of Old Market, a circa-1795 open-air structure in the center of town which was once used as a slave market.

=== Macon ===
Hundreds gathered on Sunday, May 31, in Rosa Parks Square downtown for an "Ecumenical Day of Solidarity" organized by local clergy to honor the memories of George Floyd, Ahmaud Arbery, and Breonna Taylor with songs, chants, and prayers. The event was attended by Bibb County Sheriff David Davis and two of his deputies.

=== Marietta ===
On June 1, over 100 protesters marched from Laurel Park to Marietta Square. Officers of the Marietta Police Department worked with protest organizers on the event.

=== Newnan ===
Dozens of protesters gathered for a peaceful rally at the Coweta County Courthouse on the evening of May 30.

=== Rome ===
A group of about 100 demonstrators protested peacefully at the Rome City Hall on Sunday afternoon, May 31.

=== Sandy Springs ===
On June 6, around 250 demonstrated along Mount Vernon Highway, outside Sandy Springs City Hall. Mayor Rusty Paul attended the event and expressed his support for the protesters. On June 8, another protest took place outside City Hall, where around 50 people demonstrated against police violence.

=== Savannah ===
Hundreds of protesters began a march from City Hall on May 31. Some group members went to Martin Luther King Boulevard, while others went to City Market.

=== Statesboro ===
An estimated 300 protesters gathered near the Bulloch County Courthouse on May 31.

=== Thomasville ===
Nearly 100 protesters, escorted by city police, marched peacefully from the Farmer's Market to Remington Park on Sunday afternoon, May 31, chanting and waving signs, and receiving honks of support from passing motorists.

=== Tybee Island ===
Over a hundred people silently marched in June in support of adding hate crime laws in Georgia.

=== Valdosta ===
About 50 protesters assembled on the grounds of the Lowndes County Courthouse on the afternoon of May 30 for a peaceful demonstration, and were acknowledged by passing motorists with honks of support. On June 3, Lowndes County Sheriff Ashley Paulk tussled with a protester over a sign that had foul language. The brief altercation ended with Paulk and the protesters shaking hands. There were no injuries, no arrests, no charges filed, and the protest remained peaceful.

=== Warner Robins ===
On May 30, dozens of protesters marched two miles through the city to start a conversation about police brutality.

== See also ==
- Murder of George Floyd
- George Floyd protests
- List of George Floyd protests in the United States
- List of George Floyd protests outside the United States
