= Killing of Rayshard Brooks =

2020 police killing in Atlanta, Georgia

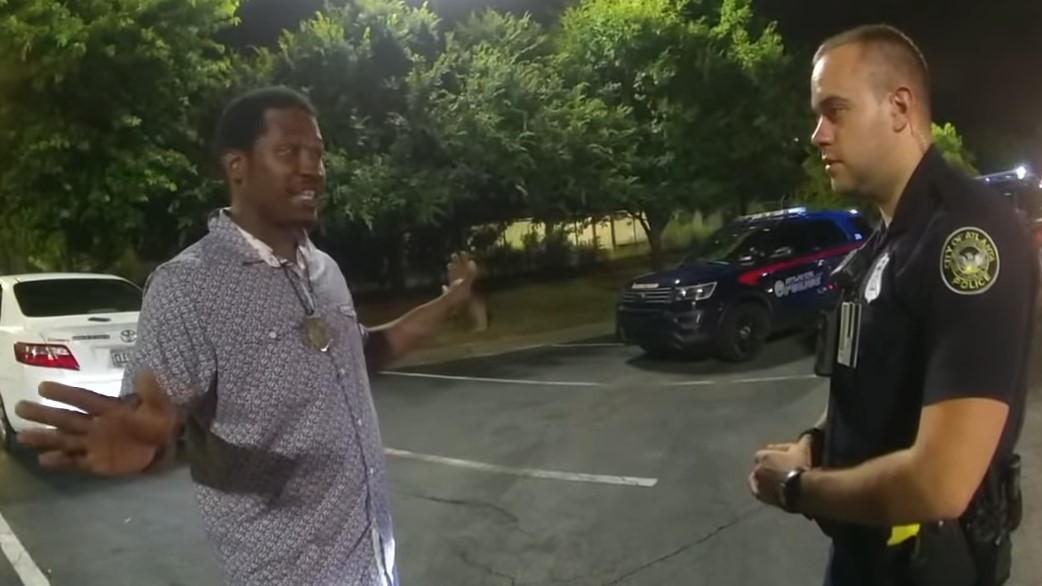
- Image from Devin Brosnan's bodycam showing Rayshard Brooks (left) and Garrett Rolfe
- Date: June 12, 2020
- Time: 11:23 p.m. (EST)
- Location: Atlanta, Georgia, United States; 33°43′18.4″N 84°23′31.3″W
- Type: Homicide by shooting, police killing
- Participants: Garrett Rolfe (shooter)
- Deaths: Rayshard Brooks

On the night of June 12, 2020, Rayshard Brooks, a 27-year-old black American man, was confronted by officers of the Atlanta Police Department (APD) and was shot by APD officer Garrett Rolfe.

APD officer Devin Brosnan was responding to a complaint that Brooks was asleep in a car in a Wendy's restaurant drive-through lane. Rolfe arrived minutes later and conducted a weapons search pat-down, a field sobriety test, and breathalyzer test of Brooks. While talking with officers, Brooks offered several times to walk home. After the breathalyzer, Rolfe stated Brooks was too drunk to drive and attempted to arrest him.

A physical confrontation ensued, during which Brooks struck officer Brosnan, grabbed Brosnan's taser and attempted to run away. Rolfe pursued Brooks on foot, and Brooks turned and fired the taser toward Rolfe. Rolfe then fired his gun three times at Brooks, hitting him twice. A third shot struck an occupied car. By the time Brooks was shot by Rolfe, the taser had fired twice, the maximum times it could be fired. Brooks died after surgery.

Video recorded from the officers' bodycams, a witness's phone and the restaurant's security system, was widely broadcast. Police chief Erika Shields resigned one day later; that same day, Rolfe was fired and Brosnan was placed on administrative duty. Fulton County District Attorney Paul L. Howard charged Rolfe with felony murder and ten other offenses; Brosnan with aggravated assault and two counts of violation of oath.

Howard used video clips from the shooting in his campaign commercials for his unsuccessful 2020 reelection bid. Howard's successor decided the DA's office could not prosecute the charges against Rolfe. On May 5, 2021, the Civil Service Board of the City of Atlanta reinstated Rolfe with back pay, after finding that the City of Atlanta did not afford him his right to due process.

In June 2022, Rolfe and Brosnan filed a federal lawsuit alleging that they were attacked by Brooks and had the right to use force to prevent him from "imminent use of unlawful force against them." On August 23, 2022, prosecutors announced that they had dropped all charges against both officers, saying that "the use of deadly force was objectively reasonable and that they did not act with criminal intent."

Brooks' family filed a wrongful death lawsuit against the City of Atlanta in September 2021. Both parties reached a $1 million dollar settlement in November 2022.

== People involved ==
- Rayshard Brooks was a 27-year-old African American restaurant worker who lived in Atlanta. He had been married eight years and had three daughters and a stepson. In August 2014, he was convicted and sentenced to a year in prison on four counts, including false imprisonment and felony cruelty to children. Two years later he was sentenced to an additional 12 months for violating his probation. In a February 2020 interview, Brooks discussed the two years he spent in prison and his difficulties after being released, such as difficulty finding work. A driving under the influence conviction or drug possession conviction could have led to revocation of his probation and a return to prison.
- Garrett Rolfe had been a police officer in the Atlanta Police Department since 2013. He was part of APD units specializing in DUI enforcement. In 2016, he received a written reprimand for aiming his gun at a stolen car being pursued. In early 2020, he undertook training in the use of deadly force and in de-escalation.
- Devin Brosnan has been an Atlanta police officer since 2018.

== Death ==
External videos
- Brosnan's body camera on YouTube (Rolfe moves to handcuff Brooks at 43:00)
- Rolfe's body camera on YouTube (Rolfe moves to handcuff Brooks at 29:00)
- Rayshard Brooks Shooting:Atlanta police bodycam and dash cam footage released on YouTube
- Security camera footage showing Garrett Rolfe shooting Rayshard Brooks in Atlanta on YouTube

At 10:42 p.m. on Friday, June 12, 2020, Atlanta Police Department officer Devin Brosnan arrived at the Wendy's restaurant at 125 University Avenue in South Atlanta to investigate a report of a man (Brooks) asleep in a car which was blocking the drive-through lane. Brosnan awakened Brooks and told him to move the car to a parking space and take a nap; Brooks fell asleep again without moving the car. Brosnan again woke Brooks and Brooks parked the car. Brosnan checked Brooks's driver's license and radioed for assistance from an officer certified to conduct driving under the influence investigations.

Officer Garrett Rolfe arrived at 10:56 and, with Brooks's permission, performed a pat-down search for weapons, a field sobriety test, and a breathalyzer test. Brooks appeared impaired and was confused about where he was. He said he had had one to one-and-a-half drinks and denied driving or being too drunk to drive. The Breathalyzer registered a blood alcohol level of 0.108%, above the legal limit of 0.08%. Brooks asked to leave his car in the parking lot overnight and walk to his sister's house a short distance away. Up to this point, news outlets have characterized Brooks as relaxed, friendly, and cooperative.

At 11:23, Rolfe told Brooks: "All right, I think you've had too much to drink to be driving. Put your hands behind your back for me"; he and Brosnan then moved behind Brooks to handcuff him. Brooks tried to break free and he and the officers scuffled on the ground. During the struggle Brosnan drew his taser, but Brooks wrested it from him and fired it; Brosnan says the taser contacted him and he struck his head on the pavement, causing a concussion. Brooks stood up and punched Rolfe, who drew his own taser and fired both cartridges at Brooks with no effect. Brooks fled through the parking lot with Brosnan's taser still in hand. While still running, Brooks glanced back, half-turned, and fired the second shot of Brosnan's taser – capable of two shots before being reloaded – at Rolfe but "his aim was high".

According to prosecutors, Brooks and Rolfe were 18 feet (5.5 m) apart (Note: Tasers have a range of about 15 feet (4.6 m).) when Rolfe dropped his taser, drew his handgun and shot Brooks once in the midback and once in the buttocks; prosecutors allege the third shot struck a nearby vehicle, narrowly missing its three occupants. Disputed by Rolfe's attorneys, and contrary to Georgia Bureau of Investigation (GBI) findings, prosecutors claimed Rolfe then said "I got him".

Two minutes after Brooks was shot Rolfe appeared to unroll a bandage and place it on Brooks's torso. Seven minutes after Brooks was shot, an ambulance arrived and he was taken to the hospital, where he died following surgery. Brosnan was treated for a concussion.

== Employment actions ==
The next day, Rolfe was fired and Brosnan was placed on administrative duty. On August 4, Rolfe's attorneys filed a lawsuit against Atlanta Mayor Keisha Lance Bottoms and Acting Police Chief Rodney Bryant for unlawful dismissal, seeking Rolfe's reinstatement, along with back pay and benefits.

On May 5, 2021, Rolfe's firing was reversed and he was reinstated to the Atlanta Police Department with back pay, the Atlanta Civil Service Board finding he "was not afforded his right to due process."

== Prosecution ==
Following standard procedure, the GBI opened an investigation. The county medical examiner ruled Brooks' death a homicide.

On June 17, 2020, while the GBI investigation was still ongoing, Paul Howard, the Fulton County District Attorney (DA), announced eleven charges against Rolfe: felony murder, five counts of aggravated assault, four police oath violations, and damage to property. Brosnan was charged with aggravated assault and two counts of violation of oath. Howard argued the taser Brooks had taken posed no danger, as after being fired twice it could not fire again; that Rolfe and Brosnan did not provide timely medical aid to Brooks for over two minutes. Howard also claimed Rolfe kicked Brooks and Brosnan stood on his shoulders based on photo evidence presented in the press briefing. Howard argued it was a violation of department policy for Rolfe to begin handcuffing Brooks before telling him he was being arrested.

The subsequent investigation by the GBI reached conclusions that differed from those of former District Attorney Paul Howard, in some cases finding no evidence for his claims and in others contradicting them. Released portion of the GBI report identified, that based on toxicology results, Brooks was under the influence of illicit drugs and alcohol, including cocaine, a prescription sedative, and eutylone, several of which were found in Brooks' car, contrary to Howard's statement that Brooks was only "slightly impaired". The report also concluded that officer Rolfe did indeed render timely medical aid to Brooks after the shooting, despite Howard's claim to the opposite. Lastly the report found no witnesses to confirm Howard's claim that Rolfe exclaimed "I got him" after shooting Brooks, and that Rolfe did not kick Brooks, as Howard alleged.

Brosnan was released on June 18 after posting a $50,000 signature bond. Around June 18, the Georgia Law Enforcement Organization, a law enforcement nonprofit, began raising funds for Rolfe to pay his legal fees, raising $500,000 by August 13. Rolfe was released on July 1 on a $500,000 bond with conditions.

On or about July 14, Georgia Attorney General Chris Carr requested that the GBI widen its investigation into the Fulton County DA's office, headed by Howard, to determine whether grand jury subpoenas seeking information about Rolfe were legally issued. Howard was already the subject of a GBI investigation concerning his use of a nonprofit to funnel almost $200,000 of city funds into his personal bank account.

On July 20, Rolfe's attorney filed a motion seeking to have DA Howard recused from the Rolfe prosecution on the basis that he would be called as a necessary witness by the defense to answer regarding statements he made that the attorney alleged were "ethically inappropriate" and actions that allegedly "systematically sought to deprive Garrett Rolfe of a fair trial and impartial jury."

During the week of August 2, the DA's office applied to obtain a search warrant to gain information about the fundraising site set up for Rolfe, attempting to obtain information including on who had established the site, how much money had been raised, and where the money went, representing it wanted the information to support a possible bond violation charge. One of Rolfe's attorneys condemned the request stating, "...he [DA Howard] sought to uncover the private information of Americans who donated to Garrett Rolfe’s defense because they believed in his innocence." Subsequently, a judge denied the warrant application.

On August 4, the day Rolfe's attorneys filed the lawsuit for reinstatement, the DA's office filed a motion to revoke Rolfe's bond, alleging that Rolfe had traveled to Florida without permission. Rolfe's attorneys filed a response with the court stating the bond conditions neither placed Rolfe on house arrest/home confinement, nor was he prohibited from traveling out of state, and that they had, as a courtesy, notified prosecutors of his travel via email prior to traveling. On August 12, the presiding judge refused to revoke Rolfe's bond, but amended it prohibiting out of state travel. Rolfe's firing was reversed and he was reinstated to the Atlanta Police Department with back pay on May 5, 2021.

On August 12, 2020, Howard was defeated in his bid for re-election by Fani Willis. After losing the Democratic Primary, Howard remained in office until his term expired in January 2021. In the meantime both officers remained out on bond. Upon taking office in January 2021, Willis formally petitioned Georgia Attorney General Chris Carr to take over the case from her office. Willis stated that her investigation showed her predecessor's decision to prosecute the officers involved may have been politically motivated and involved violations of the rules of ethics lawyers are required to follow by the Georgia Bar Association. Under Georgia state law, the AG is afforded broad discretion in appointing a stand-in prosecutor if the situation arises. In February, Carr rejected Willis' request in letter, stating "it appears abundantly clear that your office is not disqualified from these cases by interest or relationship."

Attorneys for the Brooks family voiced disappointment both with Willis' request and Carr's refusal to appoint a replacement prosecutor who would take the case more "seriously." Carr's decision came as a surprise, and subsequently Willis moved forward with an attempt to recuse herself from the case and attorneys for Rolfe moved to dismiss the charges against their client. It was reported on March 1 that Willis had petitioned for the trial judge to either appoint a new prosecutor or authorize her office to hire a replacement prosecutor.

On June 4, 2021, a judge granted a motion for recusal filed by Willis and disqualified her and her office from prosecuting the case, on the grounds that they could be called as witnesses. Special Prosecutor Pete Skandalakis, executive director of the Prosecuting Attorneys' Council of Georgia, was appointed to prosecute the case.

On August 23, 2022, prosecutors announced that they had dropped all charges against both officers. The Special Prosecutor stated that "Based on the facts and circumstances confronting Officer Rolfe and Officer Brosnan in this case, it is my conclusion the use of deadly force was objectively reasonable and that they did not act with criminal intent".

== Reactions ==
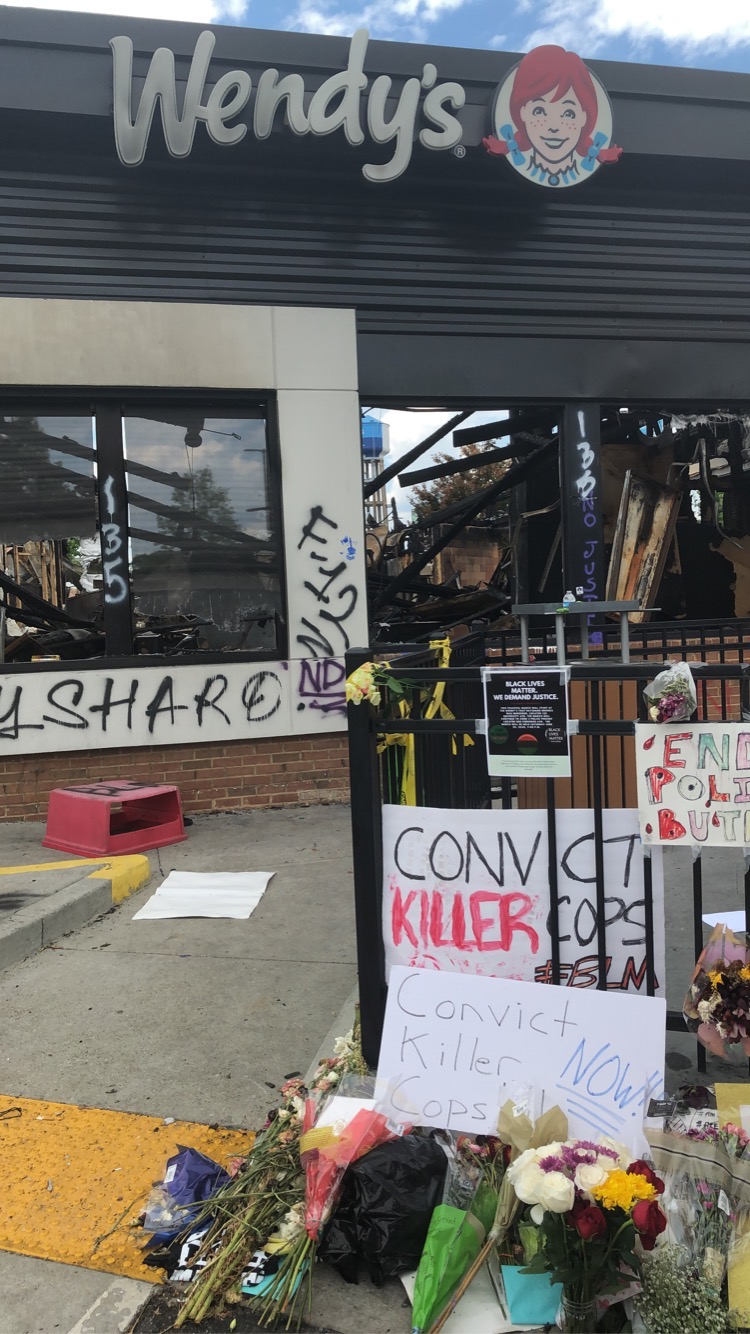
Memorial for Brooks at the place of his death

Demonstrators gathered at the site of the shooting beginning June 12, 2020. On June 13, individuals set fire to the Wendy's restaurant outside which Brooks was shot as well as several nearby cars, and broke a television camera. Natalie White, believed to be Brooks' girlfriend, was charged with first-degree arson in connection with the restaurant fire. Protests continued in the area around the Wendy's, there were problems with armed protesters closing adjacent streets with barriers, and on July 4 an 8-year-old girl, Secoriea Turner, was killed when the car she was riding in was shot at by demonstrators.

On June 13, Atlanta's police chief Erika Shields resigned; Mayor Bottoms said Shields had resigned in the hope that "the city may move forward with urgency and [rebuild] the trust so desperately needed throughout our communities." On June 15, Mayor Bottoms ordered the Atlanta Police Department to overhaul its use-of-force policies. On January 6, 2021, it was announced Shields would become the new Chief of Police for the Louisville, Kentucky police department.

Brooks' cousin, Niles Fitch, spoke out against police brutality.

Beginning the day after charges against Rolfe were announced, Atlanta police officers called in sick for their shifts, staging a "blue flu" protest. In the four days from June 17 to 20, about 170 officers called in sick and officers in 3 out of the city's 6 police zones did not respond to calls. On the evening of June 19 every police officer failed to report for duty in Zone 5, leaving only the three supervisors. Atlanta's Acting Police Chief Bryant said that the department had "to shift resources to ensure proper coverage" due to police absenteeism. Total arrests citywide dropped by 71% during the sickout. Mayor Bottoms said the sickout was a reaction to two weeks of strife during which eight APD officers were criminally charged in two separate incidents, sinking morale "ten-fold." On June 18, the Atlanta Police Foundation, a private nonprofit group, announced that all APD officers would receive a one-time $500 bonus for continuing to work through the COVID-19 pandemic and the recent George Floyd protests.

On July 6, police and sanitation workers began to remove the memorial to Brooks at the place of his death. The burned Wendy's was demolished.

== Aftermath ==
In June 2022, Rolfe and Brosnan filed a federal lawsuit alleging that they were attacked by Brooks and had the right to use force to prevent him from "imminent use of unlawful force against them."

In December 2023, Chisom Kingston and Natalie Hanna White each pled guilty to two counts of arson and one count of conspiracy to commit arson for burning down the Wendy's, and received identical sentences of five years on probation and $500 fines.

In January 2024, Brosnan filed a lawsuit against his former union, the International Brotherhood of Police Officers Local 623, claiming he had been assured the police union would cover his attorney fees in the event he was criminally charged in relation to on-the-job actions as a police officer. According to his lawsuit, Brosnan personally incurred over $250,000 in attorney fees for his criminal defense and that his union refused to reimburse him.

As of February 2024, Rolfe remained with the Atlanta Police Department whereas Brosnan had since left APD and moved out of the state of Georgia.

In September 2025, Julian Conley was sentenced to life in prison for the murder of Secoriea Turner.

== See also ==
- United States racial unrest (2020–2023)
- George Floyd protests in Atlanta
- Murder of Ahmaud Arbery
