= Atlanta Police Department =

Police force in Georgia, U.S.

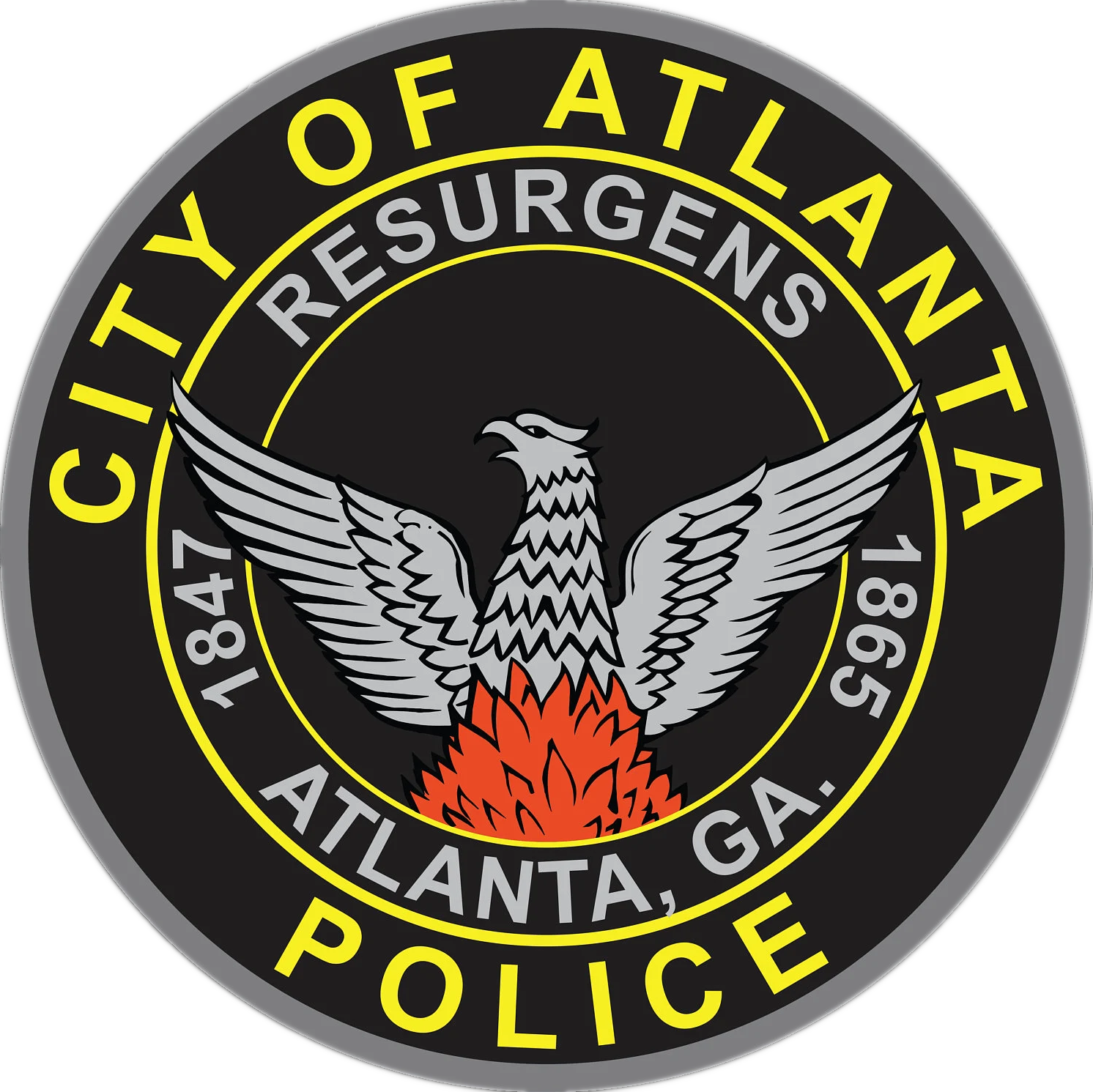
- Abbreviation: APD
- Motto: Resurgens; Rising Again

Agency overview
- Formed: 1873; 153 years ago
- Annual budget: $324.4 million (FY2027)

Jurisdictional structure
- Operations jurisdiction: Atlanta, Georgia, U.S.
- Jurisdiction of the Atlanta Police Department
- Area: 136.76 square miles (354.2 km^{2}) (total) (land)
- Population: 529,110 (2025 estimate)
- Legal jurisdiction: City of Atlanta

Operational structure
- Police Officers: 1,817 (2026)
- Corrections personnel and Civilian members: 550 (2026)
- Mayor of Atlanta responsible: Andre Dickens
- Agency executive: Darin Schierbaum, Chief of Police

Facilities
- Zones: 7: Airport; Zone 1; Zone 2; Zone 3; Zone 4; Zone 5; Zone 6
- Jails: 3

Website
- atlantapd.org

The Atlanta Police Department (APD) is the primary municipal law enforcement agency for the city of Atlanta, Georgia, United States.

The city shifted from its rural-based Marshal and Deputy Marshal model at the end of the 19th century. In 1873, the department was formed with 26 officers. Thomas Jones was elected the first Atlanta Chief of Police by the city council. The agency is located at: 226 Peachtree St SW, Atlanta, Ga. 30303.

The APD is currently being led by Police Chief Darin Schierbaum. The department claims an authorized strength of 1,661 sworn officers.

== Ranks and insignia ==
Title	Insignia	Shirt Color	Badge Color	Information
Chief of Police		White	Gold	The Chief of Police is Commander of the APD.
Assistant Chief		White	Gold	The Assistant Chief is Second-in-command of the APD.
Deputy Chief		White	Gold	Deputy Chiefs are in charge of a Division.
Major		White	Gold	Majors are in charge of a Section or Zone.
Captain		White	Gold	Captains are Second-in-command of a Section or Zone.
Lieutenant		Dark Blue	Gold	Lieutenants are in charge of a Unit.
Sergeant		Dark Blue	Gold	Sergeants are Supervisors.
Investigator	One White Chevron Stripe with the word "Investigator" on Bottom of Stripe	Dark Blue	Silver	
Senior Police Officer	One White Chevron Stripe	Dark Blue	Silver	
Police Officer	No Insignia	Dark Blue	Silver	

== Corrections ==
The Atlanta Police Department works with the City of Atlanta Corrections Department, which operates three jails, all of which also handle overflow from time to time from the large jail on Rice street, operated by Fulton County:

Jail	Type of inmate
City Detention Center	Pretrial arrestees, sentenced ordinance and traffic offenders and custody of federal prisoners awaiting trial pursuant to a contract with the U.S. Marshals Service
Grady Detention Center	Custodial services patients at the general hospital (Grady Memorial Hospital)
Court Detention Center	Prisoner movements for judicial proceedings in the Municipal Court

== Demographics ==
Breakdown of the makeup of the rank and file of APD as of 2013:

- Male: 82%
- Female: 18%
- African American/Black: 58%
- Caucasian/ White: 37%
- Hispanic: 4%
- Asian: 1%

== Controversies ==
A federal investigation was conducted into the Atlanta Police Department's practices after the 2006 killing of 92-year-old Kathryn Johnston, who shot at officers as they entered her home unannounced on a no-knock warrant. Prosecutors alleged that the officers falsified information and documents after the killing to justify the serving of the warrant. On April 26, 2007, two officers pleaded guilty to manslaughter, violation of oath, criminal solicitation, and making false statements. One additionally pleaded guilty to perjury.

On July 8, 2011, it was reported in The Atlanta Journal-Constitution that six police officers were fired for lying about events concerning the Atlanta Eagle police raid (which targeted the Atlanta Eagle, a gay bar). In June 2011, a 343-page report was released that details how 16 officers lied or destroyed evidence when asked about the raid on the Eagle Bar. At least two of the officers in question had been cited for lying on another occasion in a federal drug case in October 2009 (the federal prosecutors informed the Atlanta Police Department that they would never be used again in a federal prosecution).

On April 8, 2011, APD officers shot a 64-year-old U.S. Marine veteran who had fired several shots at the ground in front of a man who was stealing from him, which was a frequent occurrence. He lost his kidney, and while he was eventually released from prison in early November after prosecutors finally dropped charges—after threatening him with 105 years in prison—his home and that of his deceased father had been looted and burnt by criminals who stole almost all his personal and business possessions. APD officers claimed Sturdivant pointed his rifle at the officers, who never identified themselves, a point disputed by Sturdivant's public defender given that the one bullet of the 14 officers fired that actually hit him, traveled through the side of the rifle's stock.

On May 30, 2020, during the George Floyd protests in Georgia, Atlanta police pulled two black students from their car, broke a car window, and used Tasers to shock them. This came after officers arrested a classmate of theirs whom they wanted to pick up; an officer ordered the students to continue driving, which they complied. One officer claimed that one of the students possessed a gun, but no gun was found. One of the students stated that he was punched over 10 times in the back after being arrested. Within days, six officers were charged as a result of the incident; two were fired, and four were put on administrative leave. The Fulton County District Attorney, Paul Howard, stated that the two college students were "innocent almost to the point of being naive".

On June 12, 2020, APD officers were called to a Wendy's, where the suspect, Rayshard Brooks, was sleeping inside of a car with its engine on in the drive-thru lane of the establishment. Officers conducted a field-sobriety test on Brooks, which he failed, leading officers to attempt to put him in custody. According to the GBI, Brooks resisted and got into a physical struggle with an officer, which led to Brooks grabbing a taser from the officer. Once Brooks got a hold of the taser, he began to flee. Surveillance footage shows Brooks fleeing about seven parking spaces in the parking lot. Brooks then turned around and fired the taser at the officer chasing him. That led to the officer retrieving and discharging his service weapon, firing three times at Brooks, striking him two times in the back. Brooks was taken to a local hospital, where he died after emergency surgery.

On January 18, 2023, Atlanta police officers were on scene when Georgia State Troopers shot and killed Manuel Teran, who was protesting the deforestation of 300 acres of public park in Atlanta to build a $90-million police training facility; critics have called the project "Cop City" and claim it will be used to practice urban warfare.

== Equipment ==
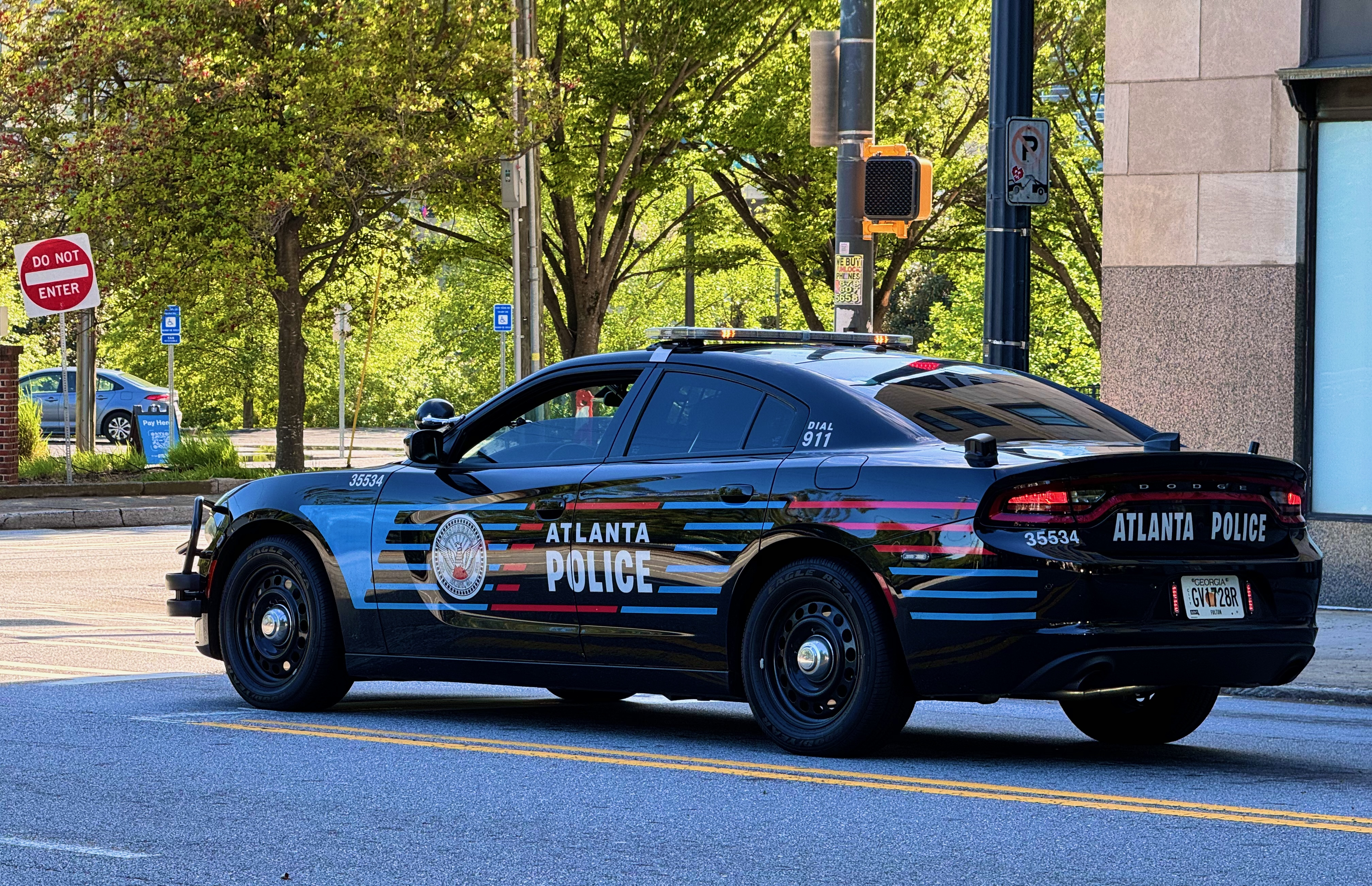
The department acquired Dodge Charger Pursuit police cars in 2022

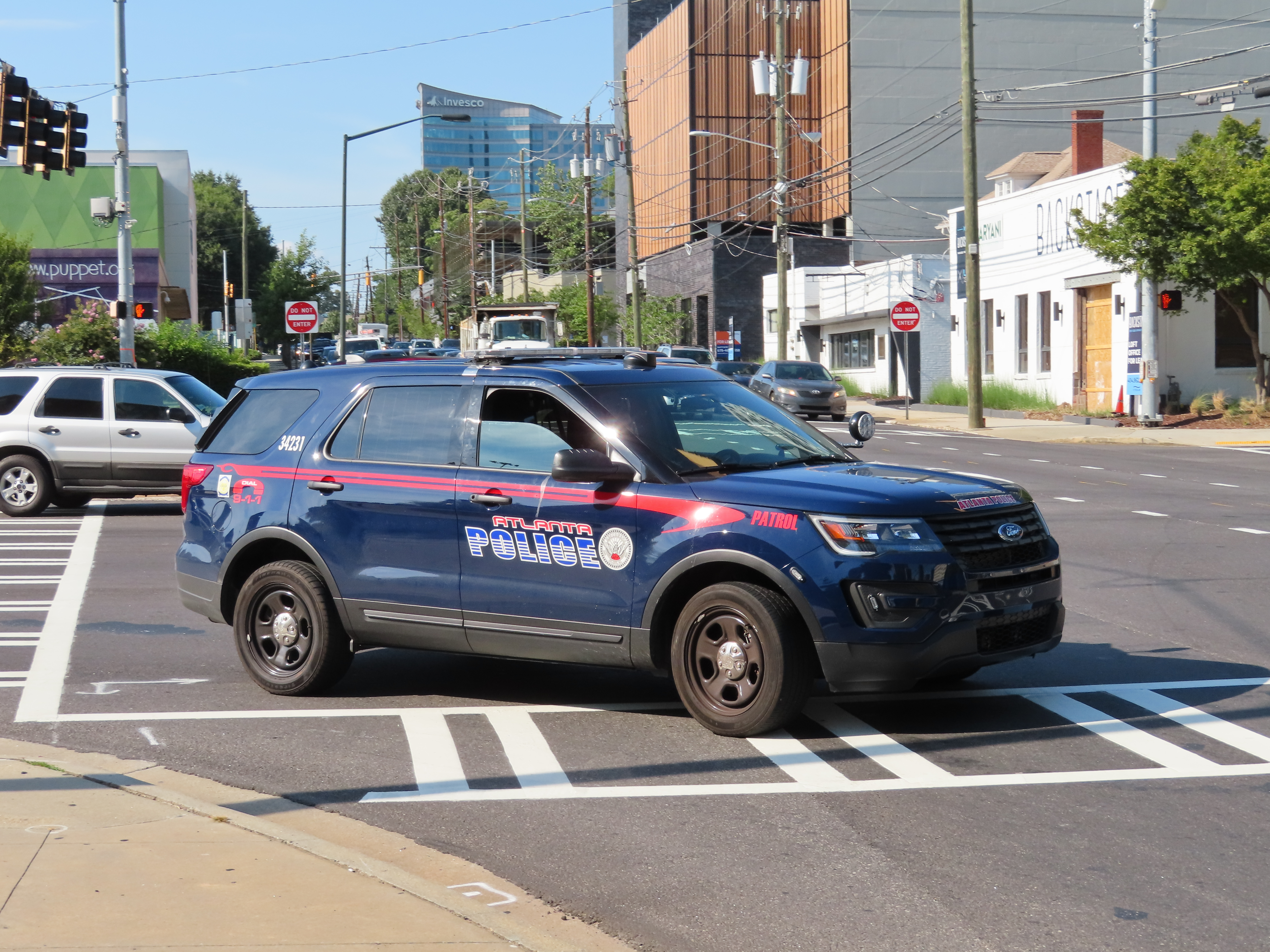
An APD Ford Police Interceptor Utility.

Vehicles: Ford Police Interceptor equipped with state-of-the-art Whelen LED Lighting packages and digital control consoles along with Panasonic Toughbook Mobile Data Terminals. In fall 2013, the Atlanta Police Department began phasing new Ford Taurus Police interceptors into its fleet to replace the old Crown Victoria interceptors. The entire fleet totals around 300 vehicles and the remaining Crown Victoria interceptors will be phased out as they lose usefulness. As of 2026, APD now operates primarily the Ford Police Interceptor Utility, Dodge Charger Pursuits and Dodge Durango Pursuits with some Chevrolet Tahoes and Ford Expeditions saved for specialty used. The SWAT Team is also provided with several Armored Vehicles.

Communications: Motorola Digital 800 MHz Trunking system that is one of the largest in the country and utilizes 24 channels. This system provides voice and data communications for the Atlanta Police, Fire, Watershed, Corrections and other municipal departments. The Atlanta Police Radio System also provides voice and data communications for the Georgia State Patrol inside of the Atlanta Metropolitan area and the City of Hapeville, The City of East Point, and the City of College Park.

Weapons: The department has transitioned to a 9mm handgun, the Glock 17 Gen 4, phasing out the .40 S&W Glock 22. In addition, as of 2026 APD has started issuing the Glock 45 MOS (still a 9mm) with some officers receiving the Trijicon RMR as a Red Dot Sight. The reason for this was modern 9x19mm bullet effectiveness and the fact 9mm puts less wear on the gun's components due to lower pressures compared to .40 S&W. The APD has standardized Winchester PDX1 147 grain 9mm ammunition.

The APD also trains and issues the AR-15 to many of its patrol officers to aid in tactical situations where a pistol and shotgun are outmatched.

== Patrol zones ==
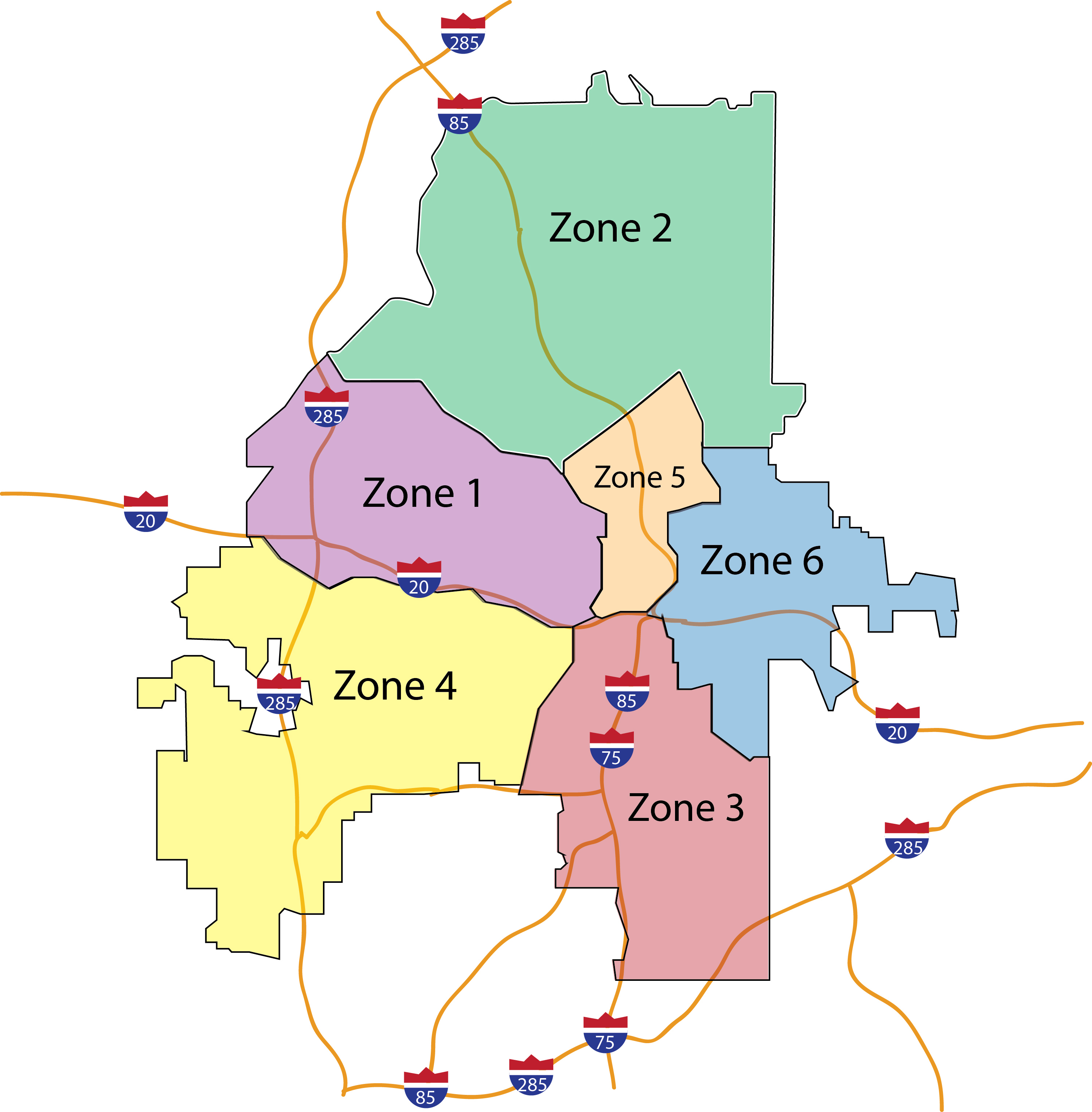
Map showing the Atlanta Police Zones in February 2013

In the City of Atlanta, there are six "patrol zones" (more commonly known as just "zones") which lie under the jurisdiction of the Field Operations Division of the Atlanta Police Department.

=== Zones and constituent neighborhoods ===
Zone 1 covers the city's northwest side, west of Downtown Atlanta and north of I-20. Zone 2 covers all of the city's northern area. The Zone 3 area is located on the south/southeast and parts of southwest side of the city. The Zone 4 area is located on the southwest side of Atlanta. Zone 5 encompasses the central portion of APD's jurisdiction. Zone 6 includes all but the northernmost part of Atlanta's Eastside.

Zone 1	Zone 2	Zone 3	Zone 4	Zone 5	Zone 6
Ashview Heights	Buckhead	Capitol View	Adamsville	Downtown Atlanta	Cabbagetown
Atlanta University Center	West Midtown	Capitol View Manor	Ben Hill	Five Points	Candler Park
Bankhead	Lenox Park	Joyland	Cascade Heights	Georgia State University	East Atlanta
English Avenue and Vine City	Lindridge-Martin Manor	Lakewood Heights	Greenbriar	Centennial Olympic Park	East Lake
Center Hill	Piedmont Heights	Mechanicsville	Westview	Mercedes-Benz Stadium	Grant Park
Carey Park		Peoplestown	Oakland City	State Farm Arena	Glenwood Park
Collier Heights		Pittsburgh	Venetian Hills	Georgia Aquarium	Kirkwood
Grove Park		Summerhill	West End	Georgia Tech	Old Fourth Ward
Hunter Hills		Villages at Carver		Piedmont Park	Edgewood
Knight Park-Howell Station		Moreland Avenue		Atlantic Station	Poncey-Highland
Mozley Park				Home Park	Reynoldstown
Washington Park				Castleberry Hill	
West Highlands				Centennial Place	Virginia- Highland

== See also ==
- Atlanta Police Foundation
- Atlanta Public Safety Training Center
- Atlanta Chief of Police
- Containment (TV series), Zone 6 is placed under cordon sanitaire to prevent the spread of a deadly, highly contagious, bioengineered virus
- List of law enforcement agencies in Georgia
