= Effect of Hurricane Katrina on the Louisiana Superdome =

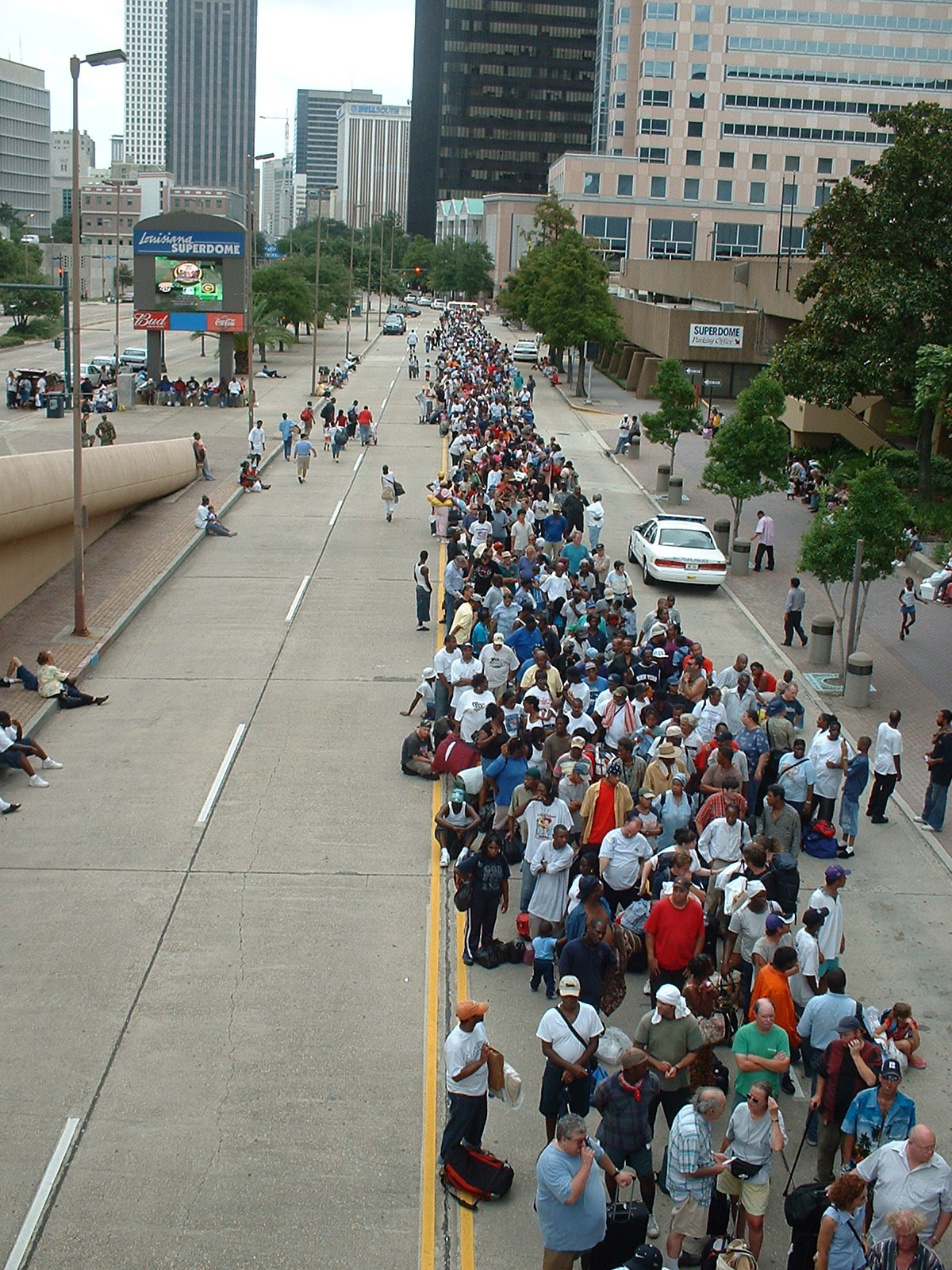
Residents line up with a few belongings to get into the Superdome which has been opened as a hurricane shelter in advance of Hurricane Katrina.

The Louisiana Superdome was used as a "shelter of last resort" for those in New Orleans unable to evacuate from the city when Hurricane Katrina struck on August 29, 2005. Around 10,000 residents would end up sheltered in the stadium in advance of the hurricane's landfall. However, when the stadium was partially damaged during the hurricane's landfall (amidst a general lack of supplies), around 6 evacuees would lose their lives. After the storm, local and national authorities would be criticized for the limited provisions allocated for the evacuation as well as the subsequent response. The stadium would remain closed after the storm and would not resume hosting events until late 2006, when the New Orleans Saints returned to the Louisiana Superdome for the 2006 NFL season.

== Past hurricanes and Katrina preparation ==
Hurricane Katrina was the third time the dome had been used as a public shelter. It was previously used in 1998 during Hurricane Georges and again in 2004 during Hurricane Ivan, on both occasions for less than two days at most. Even though the dome never lost power, air conditioning or running water during any of those storms, Superdome manager Doug Thornton recommended after Hurricane Georges for the dome to not be used as a shelter for anybody but special-needs evacuees. In addition, a Bleacher Report article quotes Thornton saying "We're not a hospital. We're not a hotel. We can't house people for five or six days."

Despite these previous periods of emergency use, as Katrina approached the city, officials had not stockpiled enough generator fuel, food, and other supplies to handle the needs of the thousands of people seeking safety there. According to an article in Time, "Over the years city officials have stressed that they didn't want to make it too comfortable at the Superdome since it was always safer to leave the city altogether. It's not a hotel," said the emergency preparedness director for St. Tammany Parish to the Times-Picayune in 1999."

The Superdome was built to withstand most natural catastrophes. The roof was estimated to be able to withstand winds with speeds of up to 200 mph (320 km/h) and flood waters were not expected to reach the second level 35 feet (11 m) from the ground. However, when looking into the origins of the claims about 200 mph (320 km/h) wind security in the Superdome, CNN reported that no engineering study had ever been completed on the amount of wind the structure could withstand. The building's engineering study was underway as Hurricane Katrina approached and was put on hold. It was used as an emergency shelter although it was neither designed nor tested for the task. It was already known that the generators would not provide lights or air conditioning for the whole dome if the power failed, and also pumps providing water to second-level restrooms wouldn't function.

== Hurricane makes landfall ==
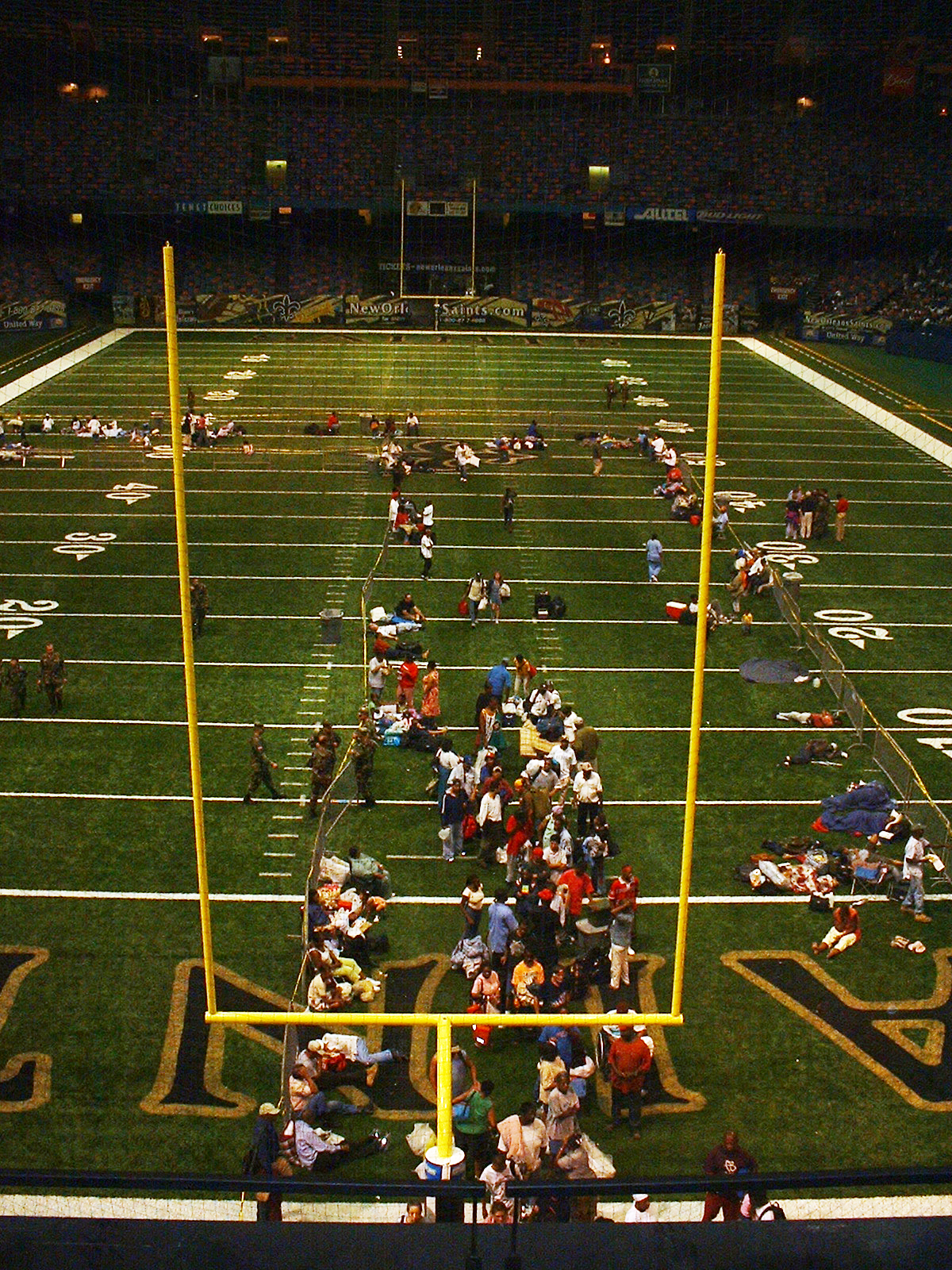
Refugees on the field inside the Superdome, August 28.

On August 28, 2005, at 6:00 a.m., New Orleans Mayor Ray Nagin announced that the Superdome would be used as a public shelter. Approximately 10,000 residents, along with about 150 National Guardsmen, sheltered in the Superdome anticipating Katrina's landfall. Security checks were conducted, and people with medical illnesses or disabilities were moved to one side of the dome with supplies and medical personnel.

On August 29, at about 6:20 a.m., the electricity supply to the dome failed. The dome's emergency generator was able to power the internal lighting but little else; the building's air conditioning system would no longer operate, nor would the refrigeration system which was keeping food from spoiling. Medical machines also failed, which prompted a decision to move patients to the Ernest N. Morial Convention Center. However, there weren't enough trucks for the patients, so they had to stay in the dome.

A few hours later, at 9:00 a.m., reports from inside the dome were that part of the roof was "peeling off" in the violent winds. Daylight could be seen from inside the dome, and rain was pouring in. The Associated Press stated there were two substantial holes, "each about 15 to 20 feet (6.1 m) long and 4 to 5 feet (1.5 m) wide," and that water was making its way in at elevator shafts and other small openings around the building. Further damage included water damage to the electrical systems, and mold spread. Although 80 percent of the roof was destroyed, the damage ultimately wasn't catastrophic—just two holes required repair, and most of the outer white rubber membrane, though torn off, was fully replaceable.

== Lack of supplies and organization ==
Despite the planned use of the Superdome as an evacuation center, government officials at the local, state and federal level were criticized for poor preparation and response, especially Mayor of New Orleans Ray Nagin, President George W. Bush, Louisiana Governor Kathleen Blanco, and Federal Emergency Management Agency (FEMA) director Michael D. Brown. On August 28, the Louisiana National Guard delivered three truckloads of water and seven truckloads of MREs (meals ready to eat), enough to supply 15,000 people for three days. Although FEMA had promised 360,000 military rations, only 40,000 had arrived by that day. However, there were no chemical toilets, antibiotics, or anti-diarrheals stored for a crisis. There were no designated medical staff at work in the evacuation center, no established sick bay within the Superdome, and very few cots available that hadn't been brought in by evacuees. Most evacuees were given two bottles of water and two boxed meals a day. Some people took advantage of the situation by selling things like cigarettes, anti-diuretics, and chips. Residents who evacuated to the Superdome were warned to bring their own supplies with them.

By August 30, with no air conditioning, temperatures inside the dome had reached the 90s, and the punctured dome at once allowed humidity in and trapped it there. Tempers began to flare as hunger and thirst deepened. Food rotted inside the hundreds of unpowered refrigerators and freezers spread throughout the building. Blood and feces covered the walls of the facility. According to many, the smell inside the stadium was revolting due to the breakdown of the plumbing system, which included all toilets and urinals in the building, forcing people to urinate and defecate in other areas such as garbage cans and sinks. Some people even chose to wear medical masks to ease the smell. Major General Bennett C. Landreneau of the Louisiana National Guard, said that the number of people taking shelter in the Superdome rose to around 15,000–20,000 as search and rescue teams brought more people from areas hit hard by the flooding.

When the serious flooding of the city began on August 30 after the levees had broken, the Superdome began to fill slowly with water, though it remained confined only to the field level. Engineers were unable to open the door to the control room to refuel the generator because the floodwaters would flood the generator, so they had to protect it by creating a hole in a wall and installing a new fuel line directly to the fuel truck, an operation which was completed at 10:30 a.m. Later that day, Louisiana Governor Kathleen Blanco ordered New Orleans to be completely evacuated. By this time, the population of the dome had nearly doubled within two days to approximately 30,000, as helicopters and vehicles capable of cutting through the deep flood waters picked up stranded citizens from hard-hit areas and brought them to the dome. At 7:00 p.m., NOPD chief Eddie Compass told Ray Nagin that he needed to evacuate everyone from the dome, as he predicted that water levels would rise substantially. At that point, the National Guard would no longer have a stationary presence inside the dome, and would only conduct patrols instead.

However, Colonel Doug Mouton had a different idea than the one Compass had; he wanted the water level in the control room to be measured every 30 minutes for 24 hours, and the dome would not be evacuated, as he did not think Compass would be correct in his prediction. Overnight, the water level in the control room had risen only an inch, and Mouton's guess was right.

== Evacuation ==
On August 31, it was announced that the Superdome evacuees would be moved to the Astrodome in Houston. With no power or clean water supply, sanitary conditions within the Superdome had rapidly deteriorated. Evacuees began to break into the luxury suites, concession stands, vending machines, and offices to look for food and other supplies.

At midnight that same day, private helicopters arrived to evacuate some members of the National Guard and their families. They were taken to the Lamar Dixon Expo Center in Baton Rouge. About 700 elderly and ill patients were transported out by military aircraft to Ellington Field Joint Reserve Base in Houston. Troopers "smuggled" 30 Britons and other non-US citizens out of the Dome. This was done as covertly as possible so as to not cause rioting or charges of favoritism. People were taken a few at a time through a garage, then to trucks that plowed through 4 feet of water and delivered them to the buses at unflooded areas.

Early on September 1, the evacuation was halted due to reports of gunfire, and fires outside the Superdome prevented the buses from being able to pick up people. Many people from adjacent buildings rushed towards the buses hoping to get on, but were blocked from boarding the buses because the focus was on getting people out of the dome. As the dome was filling up, people began to head outside into the Superdome's deck, with many collapsing from heat exhaustion and dehydration and having to be carried to the New Orleans Arena, which housed the medical operation.

On September 2, 475 buses were sent by FEMA to pick up evacuees from the dome and the Convention Center, where more than 20,000 people had been crowded in similarly poor living conditions. 25,000 evacuees were taken to the Astrodome in Houston, while another 25,000 were taken to San Antonio and Dallas. The refugees were given three meals and snacks daily, along with hygiene supplies, and were allowed to use the locker rooms to shower. The Astrodome started to fill up, so authorities began to transfer people to the nearby Reliant Arena, Reliant Center, and George R. Brown Convention Center in Downtown Houston in the following days. The last large group from the Superdome was evacuated on September 3.

On September 7, speculation arose that the Superdome was now in such a poor condition that it would have to be demolished. Instead, the State of Louisiana and the operator of the dome, SMG, chose to repair and renovate the dome beginning in early 2006. The cost to repair the dome was initially stated by Superdome commission chairman Tim Coulon to be up to $400 million. However, the eventual cost to renovate and repair the dome was roughly $185 million and it was reopened for the Saints' first home game in the city in September 2006.

== Deaths and crime ==
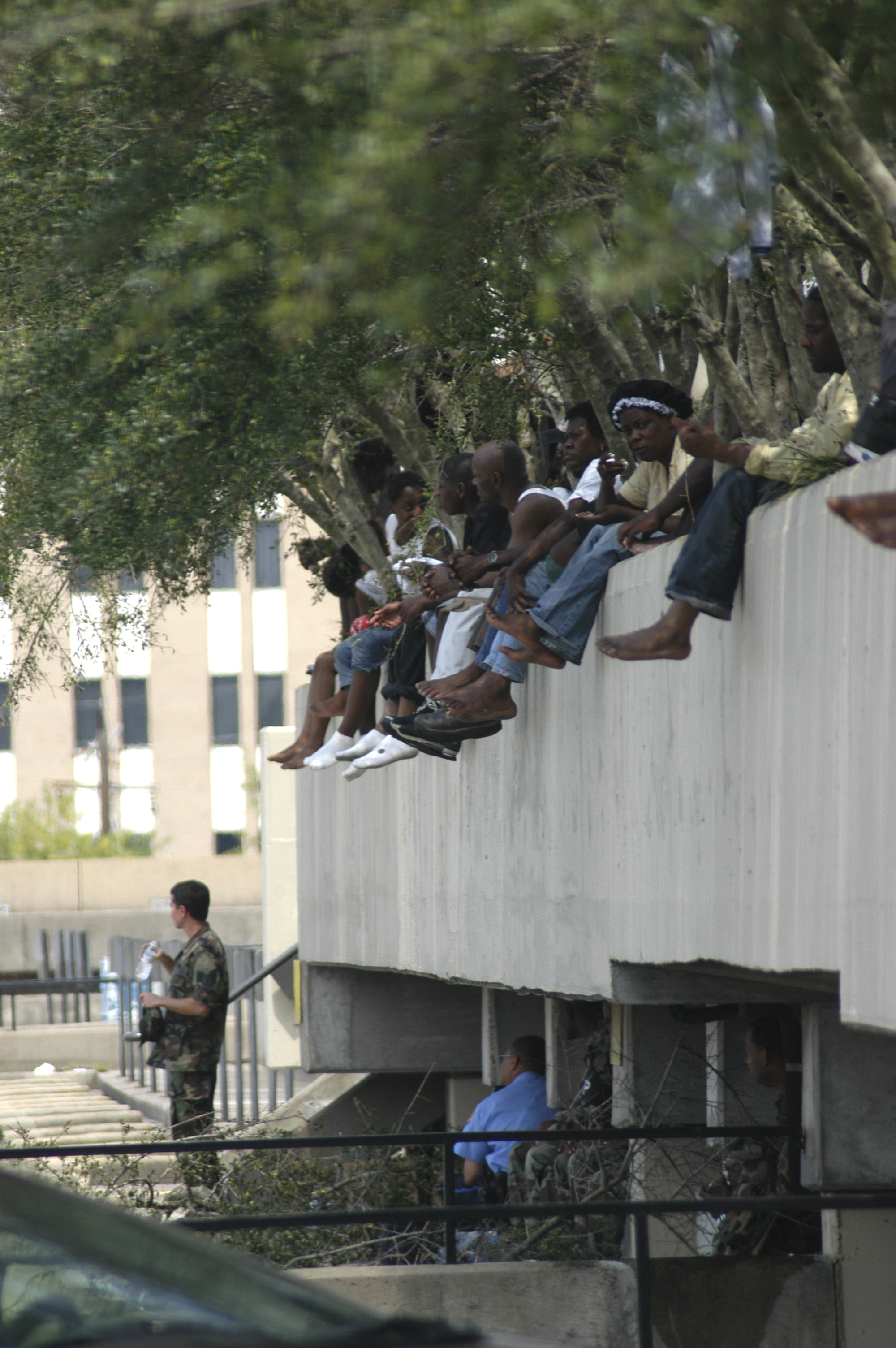
People wait outside the Superdome, August 31.

As of August 31, there had been three deaths in the Superdome: two elderly medical patients who were suffering from existing illness, and a man who committed suicide by jumping from the upper-level seats. Rumors spread in the press of reports of rapes, violent assaults, murders, drug abuse, and gang activity inside the Superdome, most of which were entirely unsubstantiated and without witnesses. Most of these rumors were caused because of the breakdown of cellular service, which prevented the distribution of reliable and accurate information. New Orleans Police Department chief Eddie Compass appeared on The Oprah Winfrey Show and reported seeing "little babies getting raped" and New Orleans Mayor Ray Nagin also said he saw hooligans "raping and killing people". While numerous people told the Times-Picayune that they had witnessed the rape of two girls in the ladies' restroom and the killing of one of them, police and military officials said they knew nothing about the incidents. False reports of gunshots also disrupted medical evacuations at the dome. However, after a National Guardsman was attacked with a metal rod, the National Guard put up barbed wire barricades to separate and protect themselves from the other people in the dome, and blocked people from exiting. The attacker was later jailed.

During the evening on August 31, about 700 elderly and ill patients were transported out by military helicopters and planes from Louis Armstrong International Airport to Ellington Field Joint Reserve Base in Houston.

On September 4, NOPD chief Eddie Compass reported, "We don't have any substantiated rapes. We will investigate if the individuals come forward." On that same day, 10 deaths were reported at the Superdome by CBS News. However, that number also counted four bodies that were near the dome. National Guard officials put the body count at 6, which was reported by The Seattle Times on September 26. Four died of natural causes, one had a drug overdose, and one committed suicide. It was confirmed that no one was murdered in the Superdome.

== Closed for events ==
=== Professional sports ===
After the events surrounding Katrina, the Superdome was not used during the 2005 NFL season. The New Orleans Saints played four of their scheduled home games at LSU's Tiger Stadium in Baton Rouge, three at the Alamodome in San Antonio, and one at Giants Stadium in East Rutherford, New Jersey. Their first "home" game was played on September 25, 2006, against the Atlanta Falcons, which resulted in a 23–3 win.

On October 21, 2005, owner Tom Benson issued a statement saying that he had not made any decision about the future of the Saints. The San Antonio Express-News reported that sources close to the Saints' organization said that Benson planned to void his lease agreement with New Orleans by declaring the Superdome unusable. However, the Saints announced that they would be returning to New Orleans, with the first home game taking place on September 25, 2006, against the Atlanta Falcons on Monday Night Football. Before that first game, the team announced it had sold out its entire home schedule to season ticket holders — a first in the franchise's history.

=== College sports ===
==== Tulane Green Wave ====
Tulane University postponed its scheduled football game against the University of Southern Mississippi until November 26. Their first game, against Mississippi State University, was played on September 17 at Independence Stadium in Shreveport, Louisiana. Overall, the team used six different stadiums for their six home games, including Tiger Stadium in Baton Rouge, Cajun Field in Lafayette, Joe Aillet Stadium in Ruston, Malone Stadium in Monroe, and Ladd–Peebles Stadium in Mobile, Alabama.

==== Bayou Classic ====
The 2005 Bayou Classic was moved from the Superdome to Reliant Stadium in Houston. The 2006 Bayou Classic returned to the Superdome and has been there since. Grambling State University beat Southern University, 50–35.

==== New Orleans Bowl ====
The 2005 New Orleans Bowl between the University of Southern Mississippi and Arkansas State University was moved from the Superdome to Cajun Field in Lafayette. Southern Mississippi won over Arkansas State, 31–19.

==== Sugar Bowl ====
The 2006 Sugar Bowl, which pitted the University of Georgia Bulldogs against the West Virginia University Mountaineers, was moved from the Superdome to the Georgia Dome in Atlanta. The Mountaineers won, 38–35.

== Gallery ==
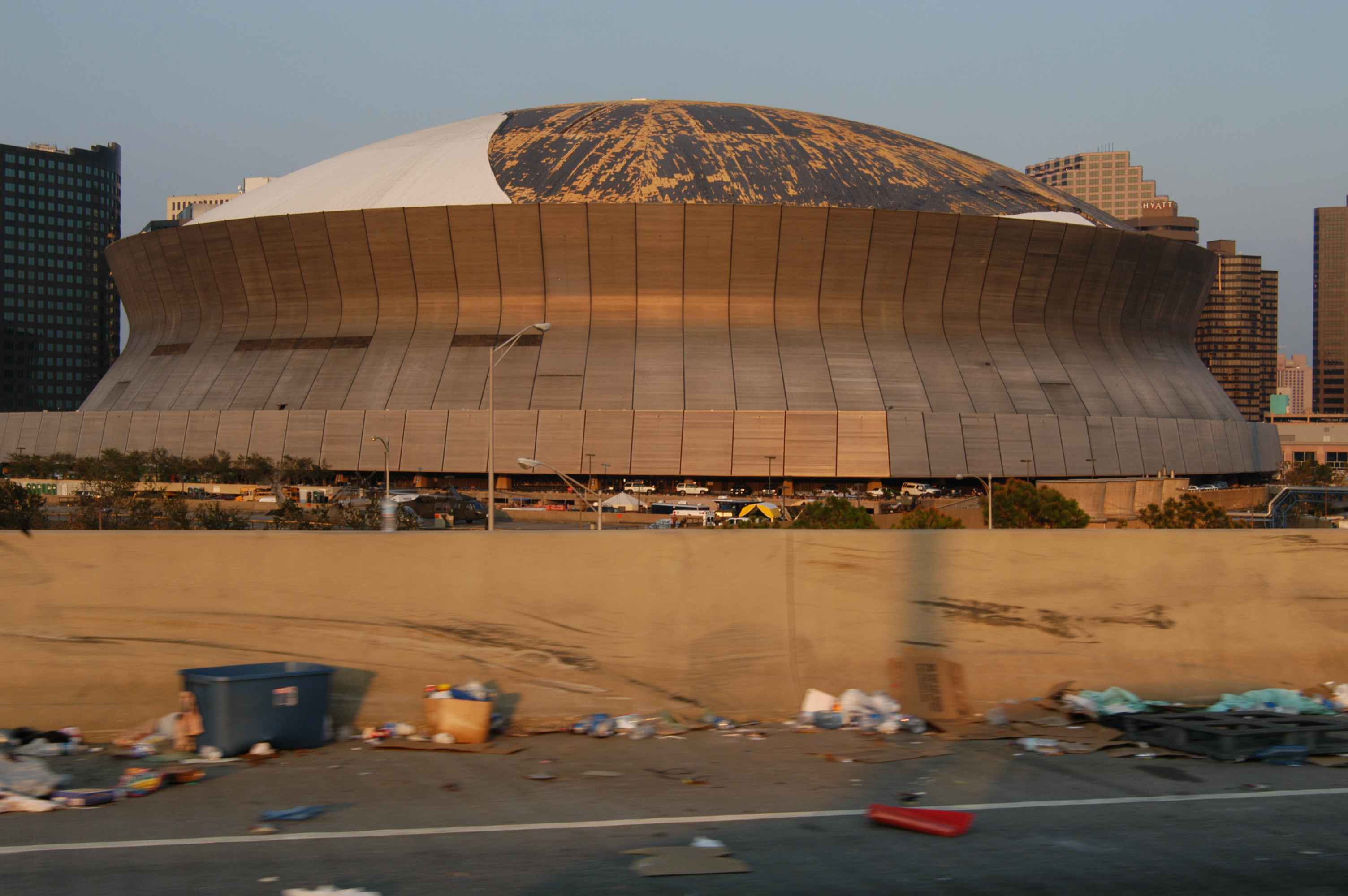
Photo taken from the I-10-US 90 junction showing most of the white rubber protective membrane over the roof of the Superdome torn away by strong winds during Katrina.

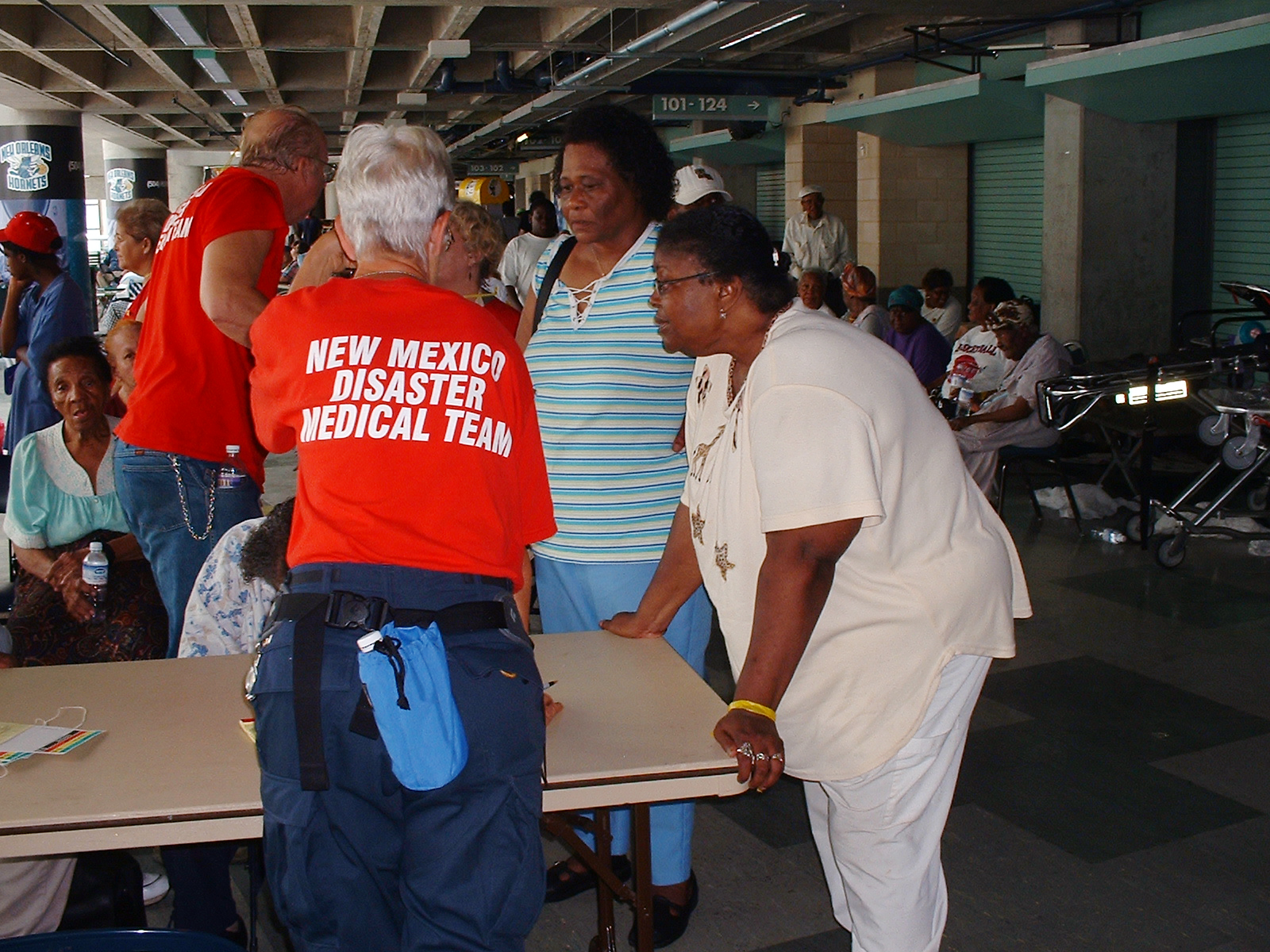
A FEMA medical team at the Superdome on August 31, 2005.

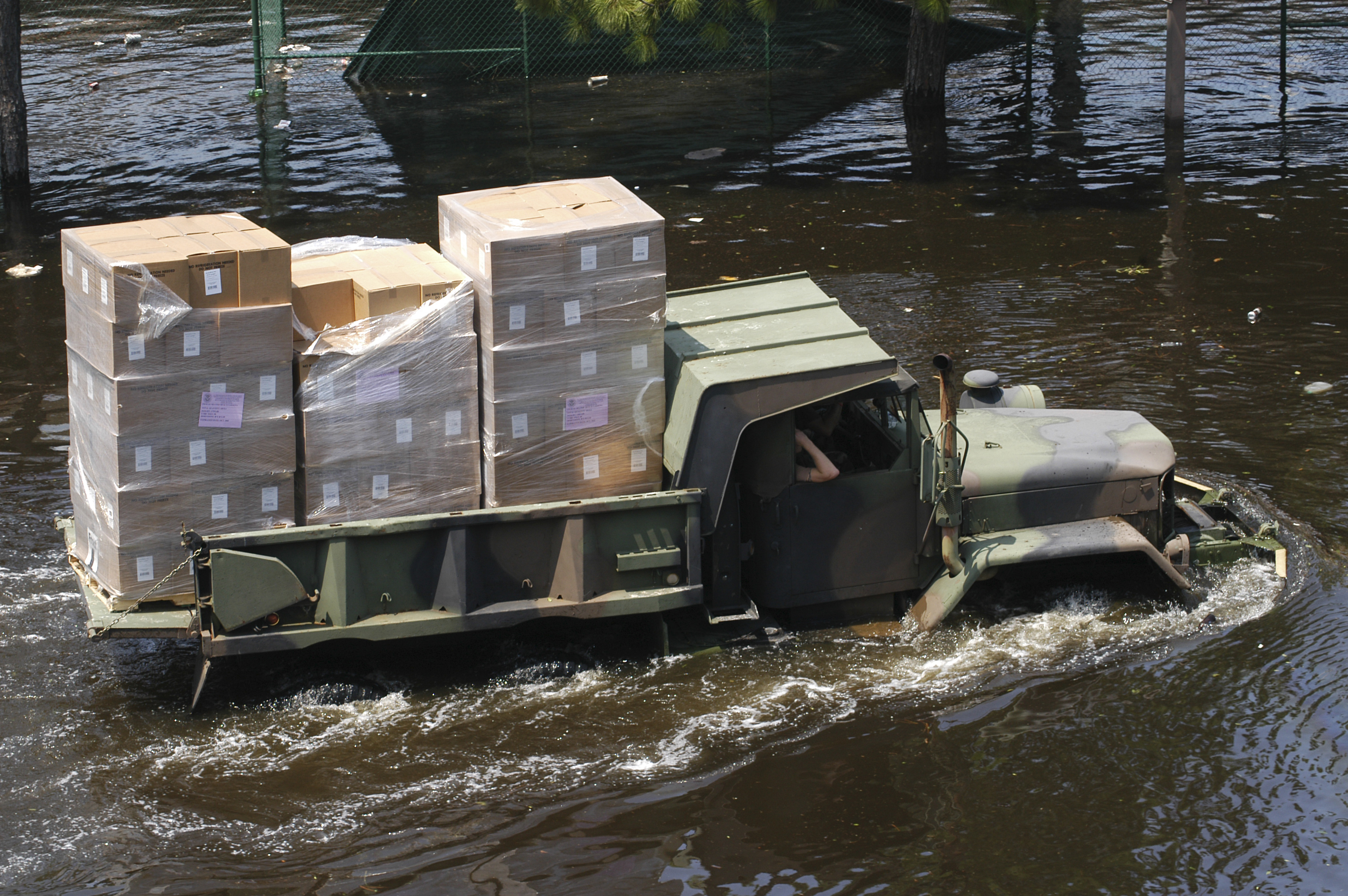
First delivery to the Superdome on August 31, 2005.

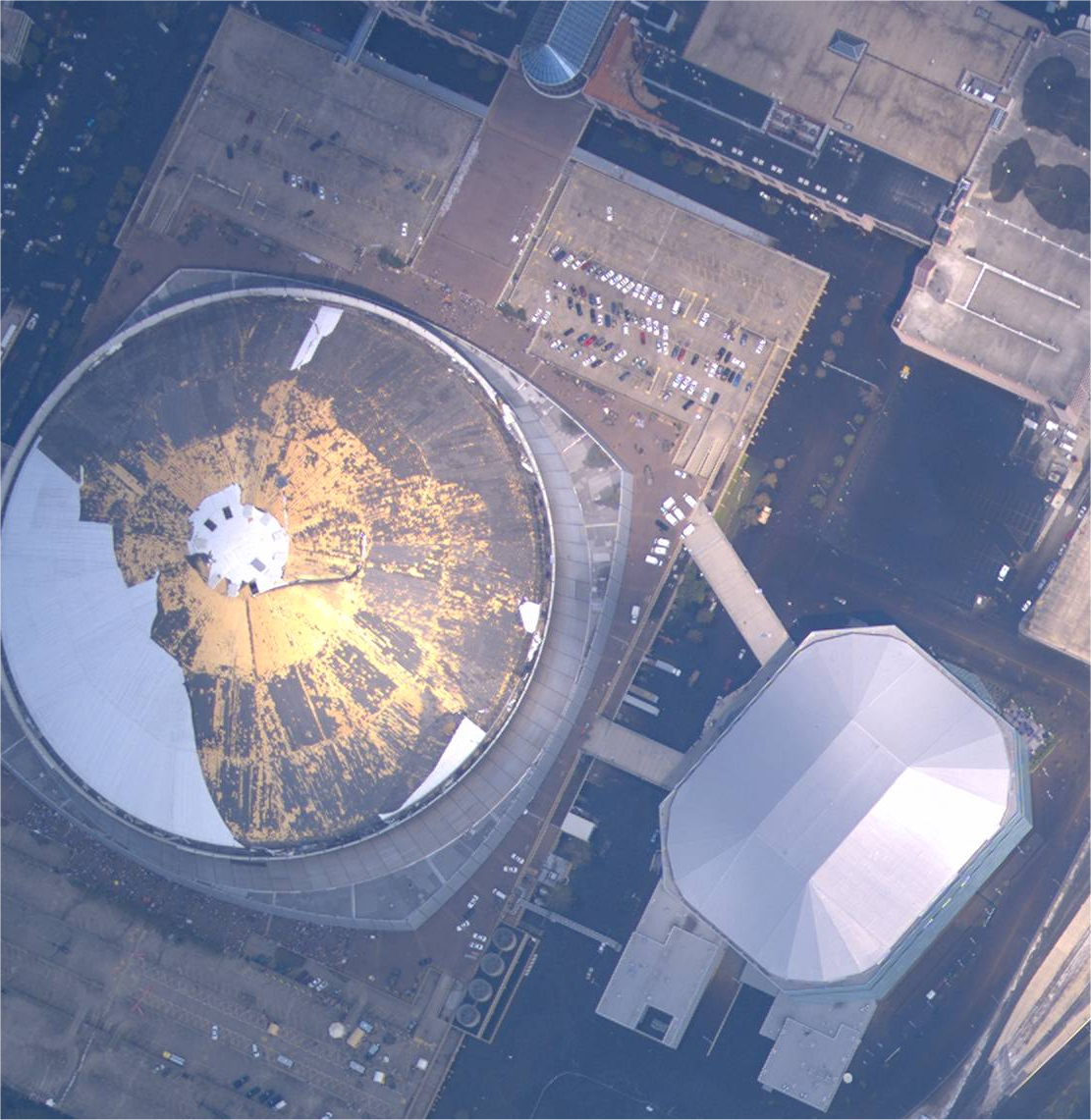
Satellite view of the Superdome showing the damaged roof with the New Orleans Arena to the right on August 30, 2005.

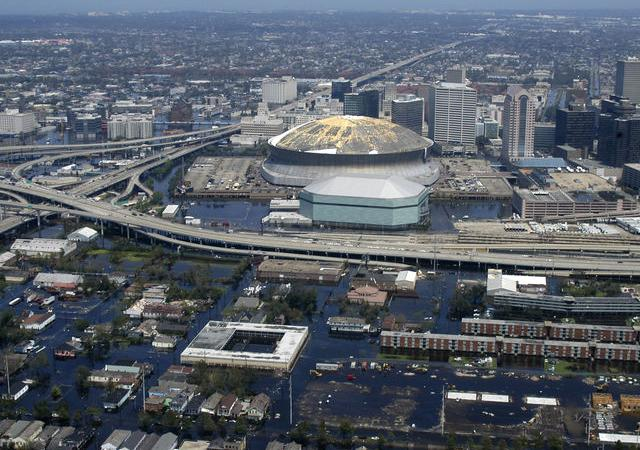
An aerial view of the catastrophic flooding in Downtown New Orleans on August 31, 2005.

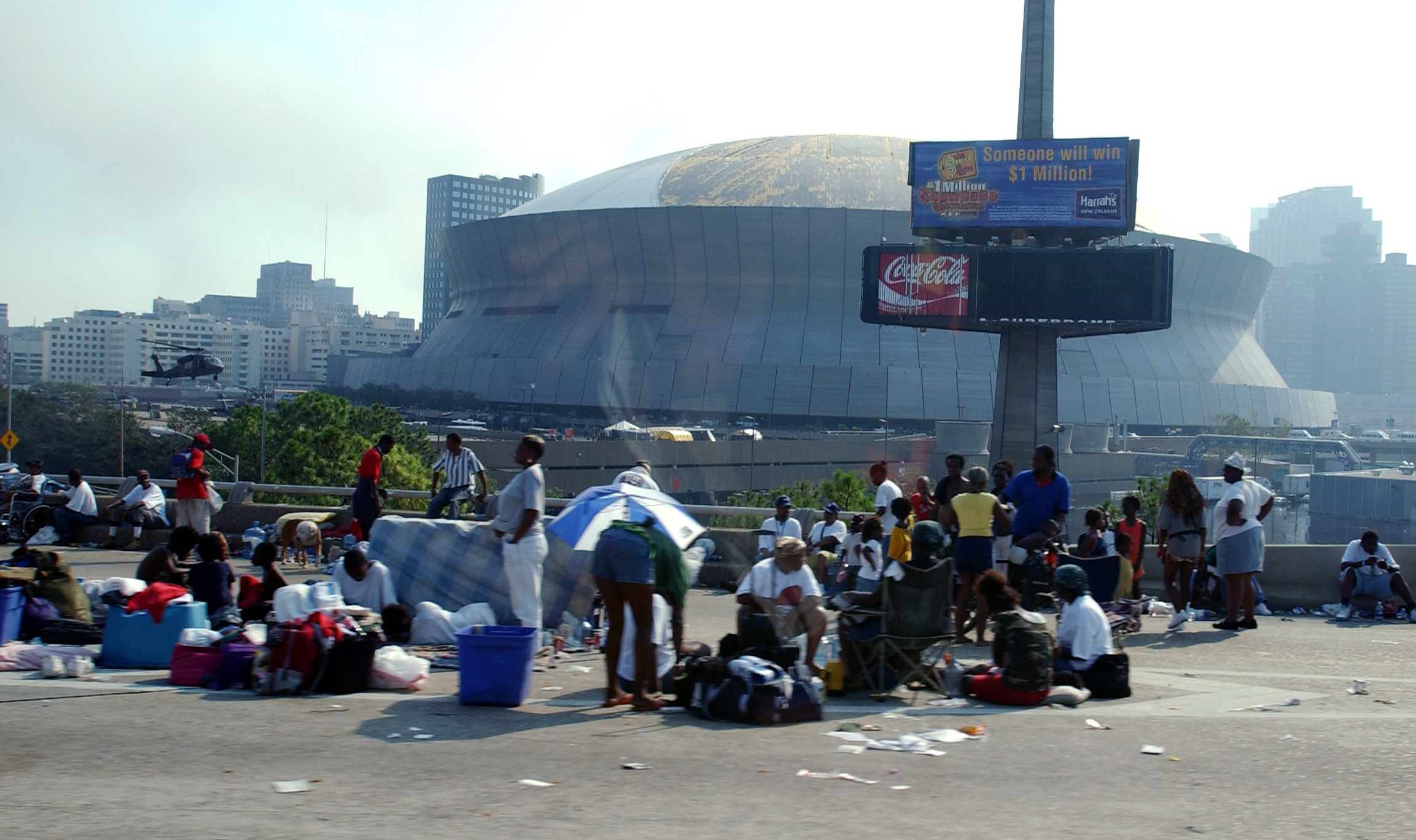
Local residents gathering outside of the Superdome on September 2, 2005.

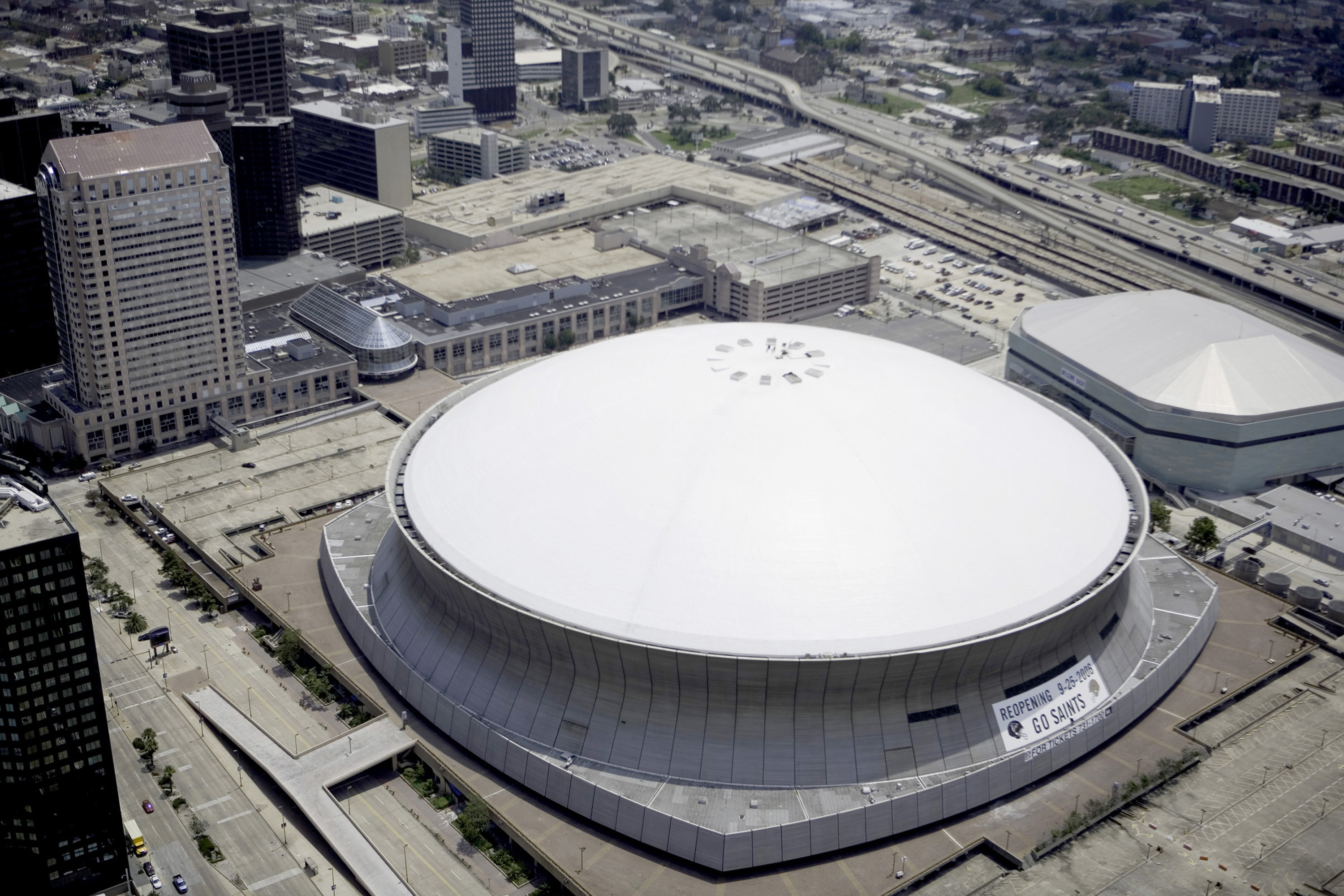
The Superdome with the newly repaired roof, August 15, 2006.

== See also ==
- Effect of Hurricane Katrina on the New Orleans Hornets
- Effect of Hurricane Katrina on the New Orleans Saints
- New Orleans Morial Convention Center, Katrina evacuation point
- 2006 Atlanta Falcons–New Orleans Saints game, the first sports event at the Superdome following Katrina
