= Robert Faulcon =

Robert Faulcon may refer to:

- a pseudonym of science-fiction writer Robert Holdstock (1948–2009)
- Robert Faulcon, Jr., police officer convicted in the Danziger Bridge shootings

== See also ==
- Robert Falcon, musician with Revealed Recordings
- Robert Falconer (1867–1943), Canadian academic and bible scholar.
