= Disaster Recovery Personal Protection Act of 2006 =

Act of Congress

The Disaster Recovery Personal Protection Act of 2006 was a bill introduced in the United States Congress intended to prohibit the confiscation of legally possessed firearms during a disaster. Its provisions became law in the form of the Vitter Amendment to the Department of Homeland Security Appropriations Act of 2007.

== Background ==
In the aftermath of Hurricane Katrina, New Orleans Chief of Police Eddie Compass ordered police and National Guard units to confiscate firearms from civilians who remained in the area.

The National Rifle Association and Second Amendment Foundation filed a lawsuit against the city of New Orleans to place an emergency injunction forbidding such seizures from continuing. A temporary restraining order was granted on September 23, 2005.

The Disaster Recovery Personal Protection Act of 2006 (H.R.5013, S.2599) was a bill introduced March 28, 2006, by Republican Congressman Bobby Jindal in the House and on April 7, 2006, by Republican Senator David Vitter in the Senate. On August 4, 2006, it was referred to committee.

On July 12, 2006, Senator Vitter proposed Senate Amendment 4615 (the Vitter Amendment) to the Department of Homeland Security Appropriations Act, 2007 (H.R. 5441), to prohibit the confiscation of firearms during an emergency or major disaster if the possession of such firearms is not prohibited under federal or state law. The proposed amendment was subsequently modified to contain the provisions of the Disaster Recovery Personal Protection Act of 2006. However, the temporary surrender of a firearm could be required "as a condition for entry into any mode of transportation used for rescue or evacuation".

== Passage ==
On July 13, 2006, the Vitter Amendment passed the United States Senate 84 to 16. It was retained by the conference committee. President George W. Bush signed the Department of Homeland Security Appropriations Act on September 30, 2006, and it became Public Law 109-295.
