= Lonesome Cowboys police raid =

1969 anti-LGBT raid in Atlanta, Georgia, US

Coordinates: 33°47′55.7″N 84°22′17.4″W

On August 5, 1969, the Atlanta Police Department led a police raid on a screening of the film Lonesome Cowboys at a movie theater in Atlanta, Georgia, United States.

The raid targeted members of the city's LGBT community, and the aftermath of the raid led to the creation of the Georgia Gay Liberation Front and an increased push for gay liberation in the area. The event has been compared to the Stonewall riots, which occurred a little over a month before the raid. Atlanta Pride, one of the largest pride parades in the United States, was started in part as a response to the raid.

== Background ==
Lonesome Cowboys was a 1968 underground film directed by Andy Warhol that satirized westerns. According to historians Harry M. Benshoff and Sean Griffin, the movie, featuring "sexy cowboys and a cross-dressing sheriff", "explore[d] and exploit[ed] homosocial-homosexual boundaries". A 2021 article in The Emory Wheel stated that the film was "known for featuring same-sex attraction", and it depicted gay sex. While the movie was given a positive review by the LGBT-interest magazine The Advocate, it was attacked by many critics for its homosexual elements. Additionally, controversy surrounded both the production and release of the film, as the Federal Bureau of Investigation had monitored both the production and San Francisco premiere, thinking that the film was a national security risk. In London, an entire audience was arrested during a screening of the film. The movie came out during a time when, according to the journal Southern Spaces, there was "continuing public anxiety over and regulation of sex and sexuality, including censorship in print and visual media." A year after the movie's release, the Stonewall riots occurred in New York City. This event is credited with ushering in a new era in the LGBT rights movement, one which saw a more radical approach in the form of gay liberation.

== Police raid ==
At the start of August 1969, Lonesome Cowboys was airing nightly at the Ansley Mall Mini-Cinema, a movie theater in Atlanta. Located in Ansley Park, near the gay neighborhood of Midtown Atlanta, the theater was known for showing indie films and catered to the area's gay community. The night of August 5, just six weeks after the Stonewall riots, the Atlanta Police Department led a police raid on the theater. According to The Atlanta Journal, the police's motives were both to prosecute a violation of obscenity law as well as to identify homosexuals at the screening. The bust happened approximately 15 minutes into the movie and involved 10 police officers, with 3 blocking exits to prevent audience members from getting out. The release print was seized and the theater's manager arrested. Additionally, almost all of the approximately 70 audience members were photographed by the police. Many were also harassed and eventually arrested. Charges against those arrested included public indecency and drug possession, and in an interview later given by the Atlanta Chief of Police to The Atlanta Journal-Constitution, he stated that the raid targeted "known homosexuals".

== Aftermath ==
While the raid was not the first instance of police in the state targeting the LGBT community, the impact on and response by the community was larger than in previous events. Six days after the raid, a crowd of several dozen people protesting the raid gathered outside the offices of the underground newspaper The Great Speckled Bird, where they shouted "Get the pigs out of our community!" Several of the protestors were sprayed with mace and the police made several arrests. Following the raid, members of Atlanta's LGBT community held a meeting at the New Morning Café near Emory University. It was at this meeting that the Georgia Gay Liberation Front (GGLF) was started, led by an activist named Bill Smith. The following year, on the first anniversary of the Stonewall riots, activists handed out literature about the GGLF at the Piedmont Park Arts Festival. In 1971, the first protest march took place on sidewalks near Peachtree Street and Piedmont Park when police refused a parade permit. By 1972, the permits in hand, an official Atlanta protest march and the first Gay Pride Festival were held with approximately 125 attendees.

In a 2019 interview with Smithsonian, Abby Drue, an LGBT activist who had been present at the raid, stated that "I truly believe the Lonesome Cowboys raid was the spark that ignited the Atlanta homosexual population." The same article goes on to state that "[w]hile Stonewall is credited with ushering in a more radical era of LGBTQ politics, many early activists saw the raid at the Ansley theater as their galvanizing moment". That article called the event "The Stonewall of the South that History Forgot" and compared the event to other "gay liberation events" throughout the country, such as the UpStairs Lounge arson attack in New Orleans and the Dewey's sit-ins in Philadelphia. Speaking about the raid in a 2019 article, Georgia Public Broadcasting stated that "...Stonewall, when it happened, had little effect on gay life in the South. It was another raid, a little more than a month later, that sparked outrage and galvanized Atlanta's LGBT communities."

== See also ==
- Atlanta Eagle police raid
