= Atlanta Eagle police raid =

2009 raid on US gay bar

The Atlanta Eagle police raid was a police raid targeting the Atlanta Eagle, a gay bar in Atlanta, Georgia, United States. The raid occurred on September 10, 2009, due to anonymous tips alleging that illegal drug use and sex was occurring at the bar. Several dozen officers were involved in the raid, including members of the Atlanta Police Department's vice squad and the "Red Dog Unit", a SWAT-like unit typically used in high drug use areas. None of the 62 bar patrons that night were arrested, although eight employees were. Seven of these employees were either found not guilty or had charges dropped against them, while one was not present at the trials and had a bench warrant issued against him.

During the raid, bar patrons and employees were subject to anti-gay slurs, derogatory language, and both threats of and actual physical violence. Several lawsuits were later filed on behalf of patrons, alleging that their constitutional rights had been violated by the police. In the resulting court cases, which lasted until 2012, the city of Atlanta paid out over $1 million in settlements to the victims and instituted changes to police policies designed to prevent a similar situation from happening. Several involved officers were either reprimanded or fired and the Red Dog Unit was disbanded and replaced with another unit. Additionally, Atlanta chief of police Richard Pennington, already under pressure, resigned shortly after the raid. In 2015, the city was subject to further legal action after the police were found to have reverted some of the court-ordered changes they had been required to make following the trials.

The raid is one of several police raids on LGBT venues and has drawn comparisons to the 1969 police raid on the Stonewall Inn which caused the Stonewall riots, a pivotal moment in LGBT history.

== Police raid ==
On Thursday September 10, 2009, at approximately 11:30 p.m., police officers, including several plain-clothes police officers, entered the bar and began making arrests. At the time, there were 62 patrons at the bar. While sources initially varied with regards to how many officers were involved, (Note: Shortly after the raid, sources varied on the number of officers present at the raid, with a September 11 article claiming 15 officers present, while a September 15 article claiming 12 uniformed and 9 undercover officers.) a later report by a citizen review board stated that 24 officers were involved in the initial raid, composed of members of the Atlanta Police Department's Vice Squad and the Red Dog Unit, a SWAT-like unit used in areas with high drug use. (Note: The unit, which had been formed in 1987, was named after the tactic of the same name in American football. According to the Atlanta Police Department, the "idea was to pressure drug dealers, users and criminals associated with drug violence". A backronym for the name was later given as "Running Every Drug Dealer Out of Georgia".) According to the lead investigator present at the bar during the event, the unit had been called in as backup for safety reasons following the start of the raid. A later lawsuit claimed that, in total, 48 officers were present at the Eagle the night of the raid. At the same time, a line of police cars (including three police vans) blocked the exit from the parking lot. According to several patrons, all staff members, dancers, and anyone wearing underwear were handcuffed, and almost everyone in the building was searched for drugs and asked to show identification. Background checks were also performed by the police. According to a bar patron present during the raid, everyone in the building was told to get on the ground with their faces down, and everyone was searched at least once, with many people searched twice. The patron claimed that the police were acting in an "incredibly derogatory and insulting" manner towards the bar patrons. Several individuals who asked questions to the officers were told to "shut the fuck up" and threatened with physical violence. Multiple sources claimed that the police used abusive language and homophobic slurs towards the patrons, including "faggots" and "queers". Witnesses additionally heard an officer say, "Raiding a gay bar is fun, we should do it every week". Some patrons also alleged that they were kicked and shoved by police officers and suffered cuts from broken glass on the floor.

Between 11:30 p.m. and midnight, patrons exited the building one at a time. At around 11:50 p.m., police requested all people in the parking lot to leave and unblocked the parking lot exit. According to an eyewitness, one officer stated, while leaving the parking lot, "This is gonna keep happening if we keep getting complaints from the community." No patrons were charged with any crime, but eight employees of the Eagle were arrested for "providing adult entertainment without a city permit". According to the arresting officers, four of the employees had been dancing in underwear. Robby Kelley, a co-owner of the Eagle, was among those arrested.

=== Cause of the raid ===
A day following the raid, an article in the Seattle-based alternative newspaper The Stranger reported that the raid occurred based on a tip someone had sent to Atlanta Mayor Shirley Franklin's office several weeks prior that claimed that illicit drug use was happening at the Eagle. No drugs were found as part of the search, however. Several days later, the online magazine Queerty claimed that the raid was not due to drug-use allegations, but instead was due to allegations of public sex happening in the building, with the raid caused because of undercover investigators' accounts of gay sex occurring in the building. The article nonetheless stated that no-one during the raid was caught "in flagrante". A later report stated that the raid was caused by two anonymous complaints lodged to the mayor's office alleging illegal drug use and sex on the premises. In a 2010 investigation into the raid, several officers stated that the reason for the searches was due to suspicions that some patrons may have been armed. According to the officers, undercover investigators had previously entered the bar with concealed guns, leading them to believe others in the bar may also have had concealed weapons.

== Aftermath ==
On September 13, several hundred people gathered in the bar's parking lot to protest the raid. The following day, numerous patrons filed official complaints with the Office of Professional Standards of the Atlanta Police Department (APD). That same day, Atlanta Chief of Police Richard Pennington and several other police commanders held a press conference addressing the raid where they emphasized that the officers involved did nothing wrong. By September 15, numerous local politicians had commented on the raid, with Georgia State Senator Kasim Reed (who at the time was campaigning for the Atlanta mayoralty) and Atlanta City Council President Lisa Borders calling for an investigation into the incident. Speaking to a reporter shortly after the raid, Mayor Franklin stated, "If there are any allegations about misconduct it's our intention to investigate them and take the appropriate action. I believe that every person who lives or visits Atlanta should be treated fairly and justly." Following their arrest, the eight employees pleaded not guilty, and two city council candidates contacted a judge who set bail for them, sparing them from spending a weekend in jail. A lawyer who was retained to defend the bar stated the following:

The situation is such that they [police] were coming in for the least serious ordinance violation of all time – dancing around in their underwear. Usually such violations will lead to simple citations to employees of an establishment. But the fact police searched all the customers is a direct violation of constitutional rights. They had no right to search them, look in their pockets for drugs or detain them. At this stage it seems to me what occurred was a serious constitutional violation to everyone in the place.

On September 19, approximately 100 people protested the raid outside the Atlanta City Hall. Several days later, on September 22, the Atlanta Pride Committee announced that APD's LGBT liaison officer Dani Lee Harris would serve as a grand marshal for that year's Atlanta Pride. The appointment spurred significant backlash from members of Atlanta's LGBT community, and in an effort to quell this, the committee additionally named the staff and patrons of the Eagle as co-marshals.

In the following months, multiple publications covering the incident drew comparisons between it and the 1969 Stonewall riots, a pivotal moment in the LGBT community caused by a police raid on the Stonewall Inn, a gay bar in New York City. A 2017 article in The Advocate included the raid in a list of notorious police raids on gay bars, alongside the raid on the Stonewall Inn and the Black Cat Tavern raid, among others.

=== Lawsuit ===
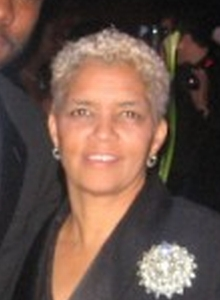
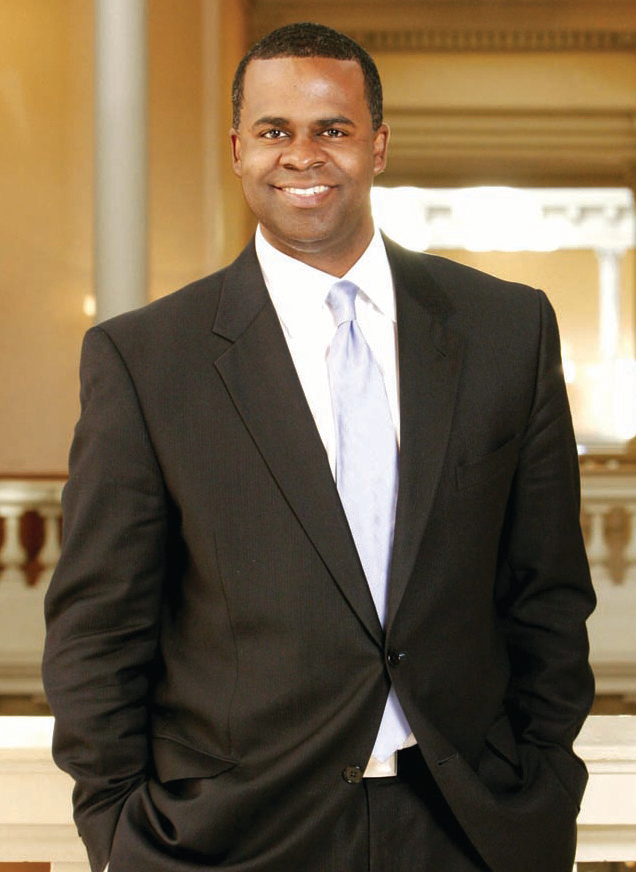
Shirley Franklin (left) was mayor of Atlanta during the raid. She was succeeded by Kasim Reed, who was mayor during the subsequent legal actions.

On November 24, 2009, lead attorney Dan Grossman, along with LGBT rights group Lambda Legal and the Southern Center for Human Rights, filed a federal lawsuit against the APD on behalf of 19 patrons who were at the Eagle during the raid, naming Atlanta Chief of Police Richard Pennington and 48 other officers who were present during the raid as defendants. The suit, titled Calhoun v. Pennington, alleged that the constitutional rights of the patrons had been violated by the police, who had used excessive force and lacked reasonable suspicion or probable cause for the raid. Additionally, the lawsuit alleged individual officers of committing "false imprisonment, assault, battery and trespassing". The suit was filed in the United States District Court for the Northern District of Georgia and requested a jury trial. The lawsuit also stated that of the 20 to 30 officers dispatched to the bar, several had been members of the Red Dog Unit. The unit members were wearing black paramilitary-like clothing and were not readily identifiable as police officers, causing some patrons to fear that they were criminals or violent gay bashers. The suit also alleged that patrons who asked questions during the raid were threatened with physical harm and violence, and some were forced to remain inside the Eagle for some time after being searched. The same day that the lawsuit was filed, Pennington announced his resignation as chief of police. At the time of his resignation, he and the APD were also under scrutiny for the shooting of Kathryn Johnston. Following his resignation, George N. Turner was chosen as his replacement.

On March 15 of the following year, the discovery period of the pre-trial began. Two days later, the lawsuit was slightly amended, with the number of officers named reduced from 48 to 35. That same month, on March 11, the eight arrested employees were tried in municipal court, with three found not guilty and four having the charges against them dropped. One employee was not present at the trial and a bench warrant was issued for him.

=== Citizen review board ===
On June 10, 2010, a citizen review board (Note: The Atlanta Citizen Review Board is an independent civilian oversight organization established in 2007 which, according to its website, is "designed to provide citizen oversight of misconduct accusations against sworn members of the police and corrections departments in the City of Atlanta". The board can conduct hearings regarding misconduct and can offer recommendations to city leaders, including the mayor and the chief of police.) voted to recommend punishments against two APD officers who had arrested David Shepherd, an assistant manager for the Eagle who, at the time of the raid, was off duty and in his upstairs apartment. On July 22, Reed (who by this time was now mayor of Atlanta) attended a town hall meeting organized by councilmember Alex Wan to talk about recent anti-gay crimes that had taken place in the city. According to The Georgia Voice, the mayor and the attorney representing the Eagle had a "testy exchange" regarding the lawsuit. The following month, Reed announced that an LGBT advisory board within the APD would be formed in order to address issues between the police department and the LGBT community. This advisory board later held its first meeting on October 1, 2010.

On September 9, the citizen review board ruled that 24 officers had falsely imprisoned people during the raid and that it was highly likely that abusive language was used, though all officers denied this charge. For the false imprisonment finding, the board could only recommend up to a three-day suspension or a written reprimand, though both the chair of the board and other members agreed that this was not a harsh enough punishment. As a result, the board arranged for an investigation into the raid, including whether or not standard APD procedures were followed and which supervisors had approved of the raid. The report was expected to be completed by that November, but the full report was not made public until 2011. Additionally, the review board noted that the officers' rationale for searching the bar patrons on the night of the raid was that several undercover officers had previously entered the bar with concealed weapons without being checked by any security at the bar, leading them to believe that it was possible that other people in the bar had weapons on them. The board also highlighted previous issues with the lead investigator in charge of the raid, Bennie Evett Bridges. Specifically, they noted that he had had 32 complaints filed against him since joining the APD in 1991 and had had a history of problems related to alcohol use, among other issues.

=== Allegations of withheld information ===
On October 6, the Atlanta Eagle filed documents alleging that the police withheld information during discovery. Specifically, the bar alleged that photos and video captured on cell phones by police officers had been erased and that the prosecuting lawyer found several thousand pages of information relevant to the raid that were not turned over by the police. Reed addressed the accusations for the first time on October 21, during a meeting with the Atlanta Executive Network, an LGBT business organization. Talking for more than an hour to the group, Reed stated that the accusations will be investigated, further claiming that if it is found that police destroyed evidence, the city would publicly handle the situation. The following day, however, the city filed a motion claiming that no evidence had been destroyed. This was rebuffed by the plaintiffs on November 1, with the Eagle attorneys claiming that the city made "no specific or meaningful attempt to explain or rebut the most serious allegations" regarding destruction of evidence, specifically pertaining to evidence on officers' cell phones and deleted emails sent between officers.

The same month the allegations were made, Reed was honored as the keynote speaker at the 16th Annual Stonewall Bar Association Awards, held on October 28. (Note: The Stonewall Bar Association is a Georgia-based association of LGBT lawyers and legal professionals and is an affiliate of the National LGBT Bar Association.) During his address, he announced the creation of a blue-ribbon committee made up of LGBT attorneys to serve as an intermediary between the city and Eagle attorneys. Speaking about the committee, one Eagle attorney stated, "Part of the reason he is doing this is because he believes this blue ribbon panel can say things he doesn't feel like he is free to say. Because as he explains it, the things he says can be held against the city in court but he believes the blue ribbon panel can say things without them being held against the city". The committee was never used, however, as it was still in the process of being created when a settlement to the case was announced.

=== Settlement ===
On November 10, presiding judge Timothy Batten issued a gag order and ordered mediation with magistrate judge Alan Baverman for November 22. Mediation talks between the two sides lasted from December 1 to 3, with a settlement reached that day. On December 6, the Atlanta City Council voted 14–0 to approve the settlement, which included a $1.025 million payout to the plaintiffs. This money would be paid into an escrow account held by Lambda Legal. Additionally, the police department would have 180 days to conduct an investigation into the raid and make specific changes to police procedure, primarily concerning police conduct during raids and detainment of individuals. Following the city council's vote, the settlement agreement was sent to the federal judge for final approval, with a gag order preventing discussion of the case by those involved until after the settlement was finalized. At the time of the settlement, that Police Chief Turner had not responded to inquiries from the citizen review board despite being required to do so within 30 days. The day after the city council voted, Chris Lopez, who had been one of the arrested employees, filed a complaint with Atlanta's municipal clerk, seeking damages of $250,000 for "false arrest, false imprisonment and malicious prosecution". Lopez claimed he had been prevented by the Eagle attorneys from joining the initial case.

=== Changes to the police ===
In February 2011, during a press conference, Reed announced that the Red Dog Unit would be disbanded, saying the decision was made by Turner with Reed's support. In its place, the Red Dog Unit would be replaced by the APEX Unit (an acronym for Atlanta Proactive Enforcement & Interdiction), the 32 supervisors of which would all be different from the supervisors of the Red Dog Unit. Additionally, officers on the unit would have to pass a thorough background check and interview process. The APD was also introducing new training for its officers on LGBT issues. In early 2011, the citizen review board published their final report on the incident and recommended punishments for the involved officers. Among the recommended punishments were written reprimands and Fourth Amendment training for all involved officers and supervisors of the raid, with the involved officers also facing three-day suspensions. In addition, the board recommended that one sergeant be given a 30-day unpaid suspension for being "untruthful" during the board's investigation. As part of the settlement, the APD would have to conduct an internal investigation of the officers involved in the raid, though Turner did not give a timeline for the investigation.

On June 28, both the APD and the law firm Greenberg Traurig, on behalf of the city of Atlanta, published their investigations into the raid. The internal investigation sustained 42 violations of police procedures involving 26 officers during the raid and cited 10 officers, including Bridges, for lying about their involvement in the raid during the investigation. The city's report found 27 officers involved in 75 violations. Following this, six officers were fired; two who had been found to have lied during the investigation had already been fired for unrelated offenses. Additionally, nine other officers were disciplined with either suspensions or written reprimands. Local queer-oriented website Project Q Atlanta called the firings and discipline "the most decisive action taken since the raid that has dogged city officials for nearly two years". Both reports stated that officers involved in the raid violated the Constitutional rights of the patrons and that anti-gay prejudice played a role. In particular, the reports highlighted six factors that directly contributed to the botched raid, which, as reported by The Georgia Voice, were:

- inadequate planning and training
- a failure in command staff oversight and involvement
- a breakdown in communication between the command staff and the officers
- potential prejudice and bias
- inappropriate decision-making by the command staff on the scene
- lack of effective coordination between the City Law Department and the Atlanta Police Department

=== Subsequent lawsuits ===
In September 2011, The Georgia Voice reported that a second lawsuit against the city was being filed on behalf of additional patrons who had been at the Eagle the night of the raid. This lawsuit, filed in the superior court of Fulton County, was captioned Burkes v. Reed and named Reed and 25 individual officers as defendants on behalf of 10 plaintiffs. In October 2011, eight individuals, all employees of the Eagle, settled with the city in a $120,000 payout. In March 2012, coinciding with the 25th anniversary of the Atlanta Eagle, the Atlanta City Council voted to approve a $330,000 settlement with the ten plaintiffs. On January 12, 2014, during his mayoral inauguration speech, Kasim Reed stated that the city's "LGBT community was hurt and scarred by the city's handling of the Eagle raid", but emphasized that progress was being made to rectify this by highlighting that the city had scored a perfect 100 on the Human Rights Campaign's Municipal Equality Index. Atlanta was the only city in the Deep South to receive such a score that year.

On March 17, 2015, Daniel Grossman, the attorney who had previously represented the Eagle patrons in the previous lawsuits, filed a motion for contempt of court against the APD, alleging that in 2013, the APD had changed the language to some of their procedures, essentially removing language they were ordered to instate following the 2011 lawsuits. Grossman stated he found the discrepancy during a follow-up with the case. The police union representing officers in Atlanta sent a letter supporting Grossman's claim, further stating that "adequate training on these issues appears to have fallen short". The city of Atlanta, in response to the motion, denied the accusation and instead claimed they would fight the charges. On May 5, Judge Batten again presided over a hearing between representatives of the Eagle and the city. However, during the hearing at the Richard B. Russell Federal Building, the city's attorney changed course and admitted that the APD had not fully complied with the court order. Following this, Batten ordered that the APD had 90 days to fully retrain the 2,000 officers in the department. Speaking of the hearing, Batten stated, "I want both sides to work out the mater in such fashion to eliminate the need for plaintiffs to come back to court". Regarding the hearing, the owner of the Atlanta Eagle stated that the city's actions following the ruling have been "nothing more than a slap in the face of the gay community". On May 19, Batten found the city in contempt and allowed Grossman to oversee that the city were moving to comply with his orders. Per the court order, the APD created a one-hour training video which all officers have to watch and answer an accompanying set of questions.

== See also ==
- The Eagle (bar)
- Lonesome Cowboys police raid
