= Killing of Henry Glover =

2005 police killing in New Orleans, Louisiana, United States

- Date: September 2, 2005
- Location: New Orleans, Louisiana, U.S.
- Deaths: Henry Glover
- Suspects: David Warren
- Charges: Federal: 1) Deprivation of rights under color of law, 2) Use of a weapon during commission of a violent crime
- Verdict: Not guilty

Henry Glover was an African American resident of New Orleans, Louisiana, who was shot to death on September 2, 2005. Glover's charred body was later found in a destroyed Chevrolet Malibu parked on a Mississippi River levee near a police station.

New Orleans Police Department (NOPD) Officer David Warren was indicted and tried on federal charges relating to Glover's death, eventually resulting in an acquittal after a retrial following his initial conviction. Four other NOPD officers were charged in connection with events following Glover's death, including the burning of the body.

== Persons involved ==
- Henry Glover was a 31-year-old African-American resident of the Algiers neighborhood of New Orleans.
- David Warren, a rookie NOPD police officer at the time.
- Gregory McRae, an NOPD police officer at the time.
- Robert Italiano, an NOPD police lieutenant at the time.
- Travis McCabe, an NOPD police lieutenant at the time.
- Dwayne Scheuermann, an NOPD police lieutenant at the time.

== Shooting ==
Henry Glover had endured Hurricane Katrina in New Orleans along with his mother, brother, and sister. On September 2, 2005, Glover had gone to a strip mall to gather supplies. NOPD Police Officer David Warren was charged with fatally shooting Glover from a second-story balcony, where Warren had been guarding a detective bureau office. The next day, Matthew Macdonald, an African-American civilian from Connecticut, was shot and killed by an officer for allegedly resisting arrest.

== Legal proceedings ==
Officer Warren was charged with a federal civil rights violation, specifically one count of committing manslaughter with a firearm. Officer Gregory McRae was charged with obstructing justice and other charges in relation to burning Glover's body in a 2001 Chevrolet Malibu that belonged to one of Glover's friends. Police Lieutenant Dwayne Scheuermann was charged with assaulting civilians who came to Glover's aid, and obstructing the federal investigation into the burning of Glover's body. Police Lieutenant Travis McCabe was charged with obstructing justice and lying to the Federal Bureau of Investigation (FBI). He was also charged with lying to a federal grand jury. Police Lieutenant Robert Italiano was charged with obstructing justice and lying to the FBI. In total, the 11-count indictment accused the five officers for their roles in the fatal shooting of Glover, the assaulting of Glover's brother and one of his neighbors, and attempting to conceal their actions, through activities such as the attempted cremation of Glover's corpse. Glover's death was highlighted as an example of police misconduct in the direct aftermath of Hurricane Katrina.

Prosecutors alleged that Warren had fatally shot Glover in the chest with a .223 rifle near an Algiers strip mall. Glover's brother, Edward King, and sister, Patrice Glover, came to Glover's aid. A neighbor of Glover named William Tanner drove Glover and his brother to seek medical attention at a nearby school, Habans Elementary School, which had been commandeered by a SWAT team of officers. Several SWAT officers testified in trial that Tanner actually fled from a marked police car near the school. It was only after several other police cars joined in the chase that he stopped on the Mercedes Street side of the school. Neither of the two men knew how Glover had been injured. SWAT officers at the school immediately placed Tanner and King into handcuffs, and then allegedly beat them. The jury acquitted the officers on this charge.

Testimony at trial also alleged that an African American officer also struck one of the detained men, but little effort was put into finding that officer. While it was alleged by William Tanner in numerous media interviews that the SWAT officers let Henry Glover bleed to death in the car, the trial testimony of Lt. Scheuermann proved that in fact he had checked Glover's body for any signs of life and in fact he was already deceased. This proof was in the form of photographs provided to the defense in discovery. NOPD officer Gregory McRae set fire to Glover’s body as it sat inside Tanner’s 2001 Chevrolet Malibu. The car was left parked on a Mississippi River levee down the street from a NOPD office. Istvan Balogh, a former law enforcement officer who had come in from out of state, discovered Glover's corpse on September 9. He admitted in trial that he video taped the burned car with Glover's remains and has since sold copies of the video tape.

On March 31, 2011, Judge Lance Africk sentenced David Warren to 25 years and 9 months in federal prison on a federal civil rights violation of committing manslaughter with a firearm. Judge Africk sentenced Gregory McRae to 17 years and 3 months in prison and 3 years of supervised release on obstruction of justice and another civil rights charge. "Henry Glover was not at the strip mall to commit suicide. He was there to retrieve some baby clothing. You killed a man. Despite your tendentious arguments to the contrary, it was no mistake," Africk told Warren. However, on December 17, 2012, the Fifth Circuit Court of Appeals vacated Warren's conviction and one of the convictions related to McRae, ordering new trials on those charges. The three-judge panel found, among other concerns, that the trials of the two men should have been conducted separately. Warren was acquitted in 2013.

In 2014, McRae was resentenced to 17 years and three months in prison. "You did not merely burn a corpse, you, a law enforcement officer, burned a corpse to obstruct justice," Judge Africk said. He said the acquittal of Warren was irrelevant to McRae's own crimes.

In 2015, McRae was granted a resentencing hearing after his obstruction of justice conviction was overturned entirely. In 2016, Africk reduced McRae's sentence to 11 years and nine months, which was within the federal guidelines. However, he rejected calls for a greater reduction on the grounds that McRae was mentally disturbed at the time of the crime, stating that a long prison sentence was still warranted due to the severity of the crime. "The facts behind your conviction deal with much more than the burning of an automobile," he said. "By hiding behind a blue wall of silence, you were hiding the truth." McRae was released from prison on April 2, 2021.

The Glover case was incorporated into the plot of the television series Treme. The defendants cited local media coverage along with the portrayal in Treme when they sought a change of venue for the re-trial.

== See also ==
- Danziger Bridge shootings
- Lists of killings by law enforcement officers in the United States
- New Orleans Police Department
