= New Orleans security districts =

New Orleans security districts are zones in the New Orleans metropolitan area that employ private security companies to supplement the work of the New Orleans Police Department in providing for public safety.

The oldest of at least fifteen existing security districts is the Lakeview Crime Prevention District, founded during the 1997 legislative session. Security districts have been established through ballot initiatives and are funded by increases to property taxes within the security districts. Such taxes range from $100 to $440 annually for residential property, with higher rates for businesses in some security districts.
