= Danziger Bridge =

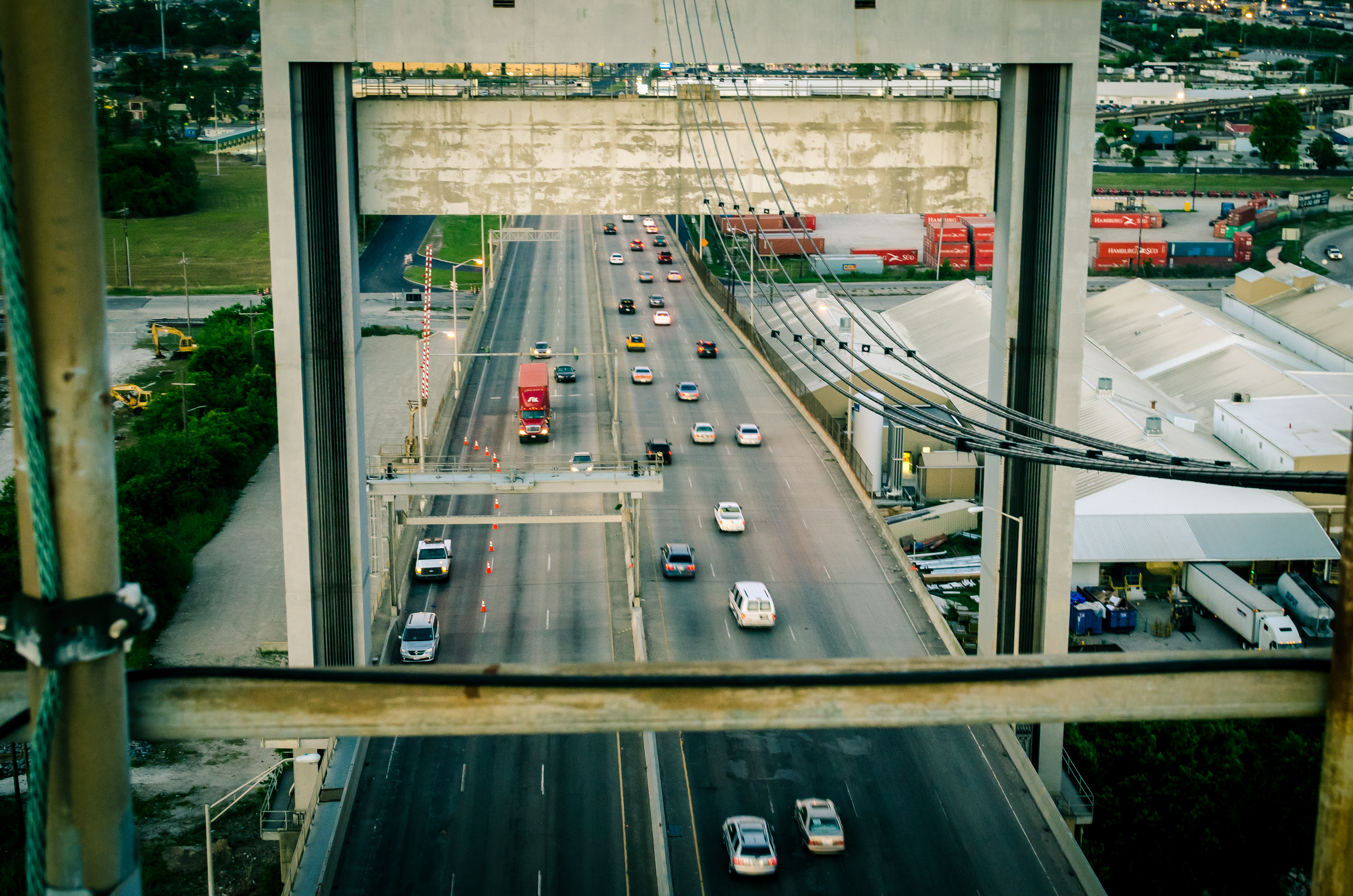
- Traffic on Danziger Bridge, 2012
- Coordinates: 30°00′30″N 90°01′38″W
- Carries: US 90 (Chef Menteur Highway)
- Crosses: Industrial Canal
- Locale: New Orleans, Louisiana
- Preceded by: Danziger Bridge

History
- Construction start: 1983
- Construction end: 1987
- Opened: February 1988

The Danziger Bridge is a vertical lift bridge that carries seven vehicular lanes of U.S. Route 90 (Chef Menteur Highway) across the Industrial Canal in New Orleans, Louisiana. Built to replace the old Danziger Bridge, a draw bridge constructed in 1931–1932, the current Danziger Bridge was constructed on the south side of the old bridge between 1983 and 1987 and officially opened in February 1988. Named after a New Orleans lawyer and businessman, it became the widest lift bridge in the world. Most marine traffic is accommodated in the down position.

Attorney Alfred Danziger, a member of a prominent New Orleans Jewish family, served as personal attorney for Governor Huey Long as well as assistant attorney general in 1934 and executive counsel for Mayor Robert Maestri from 1936 to 1946. He was also a principal fundraiser for the historically black Dillard University which was founded in 1930 by merging Straight University and other African American serving institutions.

In 2005, the bridge was the site of the Danziger Bridge shootings, in which two unarmed African American civilians were killed by members of the New Orleans Police Department (NOPD.) Four (4) other civilians were also wounded.
