= Richard Pennington =

American police officer

Atlanta Chief of Police
- In office 2002–2010
- Preceded by: Beverly Harvard
- Succeeded by: George N. Turner

Superintendent of the New Orleans Police Department
- In office October 14, 1994 - May 6, 2002
- Preceded by: Joseph Orticke
- Succeeded by: Eddie Compass

Personal details
- Born: Richard Javon Pennington; November 26, 1946 Little Rock, Arkansas, U.S.
- Died: May 4, 2017 (aged 70) Atlanta, Georgia, U.S.
- Education: American University; University of the District of Columbia

Richard Pennington (November 26, 1946 – May 4, 2017) served as Superintendent of the New Orleans Police Department in New Orleans, Louisiana from 1994 to 2002 and Chief of the Atlanta Police Department in Atlanta, Georgia from 2002 to 2010.

== Early life ==
Pennington was born in Little Rock, Arkansas where his mother was a barber with her own shop and his father worked on the Rock Island Railroad. The railroad closed while Pennington was in high school and the family moved to Gary, Indiana, where his father became a crane operator with U.S. Steel as well as a part-time deputy sheriff. Pennington also had an uncle in the Chicago police force. After her children grew up and moved out, Pennington's mother opened a pool hall and a restaurant as well as built apartments as rental units. Pennington also spent childhood summers in rural Alabama with his grandfather.

== Early career and education ==
At 18, Pennington enlisted in the U.S. Air Force and served as a member of the U.S. Air Force Security Police unit during the Vietnam War. He began his career in law enforcement in 1968 as an officer in the Metropolitan Police Department of the District of Columbia (MPD); his first partner was Donald Graham who became publisher of The Washington Post.

While working full-time, Pennington earned a bachelor's degree in criminal justice from American University and a master's degree in counseling from the University of the District of Columbia.

== Career ==
Pennington served in MPD for 26 years and was eventually promoted to assistant chief. In October 1994, he became police chief in New Orleans, where he was credited with major improvements in what had been a poorly regarded and corruption-ridden police department. In fact, conditions in the department were so bad before Pennington arrived, the United States Department of Justice was threatening to move in and take over the city's law enforcement. On the day of his inauguration, he was notified of an investigation that one of his officers had murdered a witness. Under Pennington, more than 350 officers were disciplined, fired (more than 100) or indicted for misconduct, while one officer would become the second sentenced to death for violent crimes.

Pennington was a candidate in the 2002 New Orleans mayoral election. Although he led in most pre-election polls, he finished second to Ray Nagin in the first round of voting, and lost the runoff election to Nagin by a margin of 59% to 41%. Shortly thereafter, he resigned as New Orleans police chief. In July 2002, Shirley Franklin hired Pennington as the police chief of Atlanta, Georgia. He served in that position until 2010, overseeing a 39% reduction in violent crime in the city.

In 2009, Pennington was a defendant in a lawsuit which alleges that he, along with other senior officers, engaged in a criminal conspiracy to retaliate against a police officer who testified on behalf of a defendant in a bond hearing in federal court. The case, Reid v. City of Atlanta, et al., United States District Court, Northern District of Georgia, Atlanta Division, is pending on cross motions for summary judgment.

Pennington was also a defendant in the federal civil rights lawsuit of Calhoun v. Pennington, filed in November 2009 on behalf of patrons of the Atlanta Eagle, a gay bar that was subject to the Atlanta Eagle police raid in 2009.

== Personal life ==
Pennington was married from 1974 to 1984 and had one son from this marriage. He remarried in 1992 and had a second son.
