= New Orleans Police Department =

Municipal police department in Louisiana, U.S.

- Abbreviation: NOPD

Agency overview
- Formed: 1796
- Employees: 1,457 (2020)
- Annual budget: $194 million (2020)

Jurisdictional structure
- Operations jurisdiction: New Orleans, Louisiana, United States
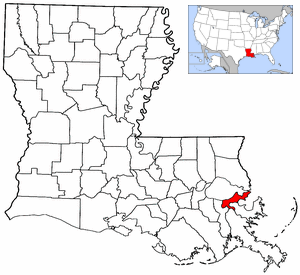
- Map of New Orleans Police Department's jurisdiction
- Area: 350.2 square miles (907 km^{2})
- Population: 383,997 (2020 census)
- General nature: Local civilian police

Operational structure
- Headquarters: 1615 Poydras St.
- Officers: ▼ ~900 of 1,200 (2026)
- Agency executive: Anne Kirkpatrick, Superintendent
- Bureaus: 5

Facilities
- Districts: 8
- Central lockups: 1

Website
- nola.gov/nopd

The New Orleans Police Department (NOPD) has primary responsibility for law enforcement in New Orleans, Louisiana, United States. The department's jurisdiction covers all of Orleans Parish, while the city itself is divided into eight police districts.

The NOPD has a long history of civil rights violations, corruption and poor oversight. Since 2012, the NOPD has been in a federal consent decree where it has to implement sweeping reforms to address a wide array of structural problems identified by the U.S. Department of Justice in a 2011 report. The NOPD exited the consent decree on November 19, 2025.

== History ==
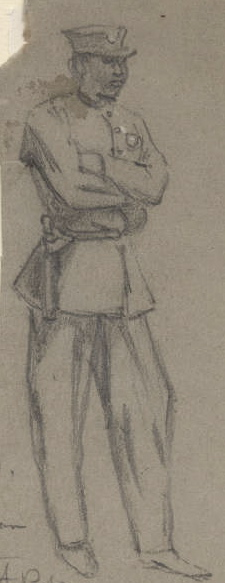
African American New Orleans Police officer, 1871, sketched by Alfred Waud

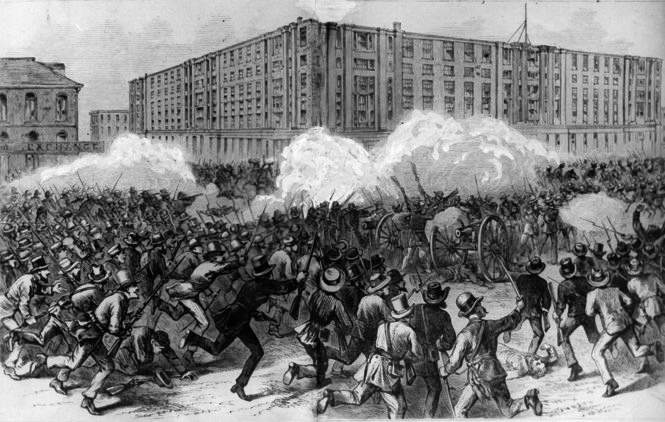
Battle of Liberty Place-charge on the police and militia

After New Orleans was founded by French colonists in 1718, the policing of the city was done by military forces. These were alternating French, Spanish and French under differing governmental rule. The formation of the New Orleans Police Department was first recorded in 1796, during the administration of Baron Francisco Luis Héctor de Carondelet. The account said, "Crime had reached such proportions by the mid-1790s that a full-time city police force was required."

The New Orleans police were highly militarized from the late 1700s onwards, as it policed large concentrations of slaves. New Orleans police were in stark contrast to police in the Northern United States at the time, which were far less militarized.

On November 8, 1803, Mayor Etienne de Boré held the first council meeting, and appoints a committee to inspect prisons and formulate police rules. He also appoints Pierre Achille Rivery Commissioner General of Police, with 25 agents at his head. They are quickly forced to resign as a result of numerous complaints, and the city authorized to engage mulattoes, which are placed under the authority of white officers, became a part of the United States on December 20, 1803, by virtue of the Louisiana Purchase. In 1804 a patrol militia was organized under James Pitot, the Mayor of New Orleans, two years later the body dissolved. With urbanization, in 1817, the city had 46 commissioners, it was divided into four police districts (Old Square, Faubourg Tremé (in), St. Mary and Faubourg Marigny). Given the inefficiency of this one, committees of "vigilantes" are created in the years 1820–1830. In 1836, the city was divided into three separate municipalities, each with an autonomous police force.

In July 1866 Republicans called for a Louisiana Constitutional Convention at the Mechanics Institute in New Orleans, as they were angered by the legislature's passage of Black Codes and failure to provide suffrage for free men of color and freedmen. Blacks marched in support of the convention, and were attacked on the street by a white mob, made up of ex-Confederate veterans. This was later called the New Orleans Riot of 1866. The mob killed 34 black citizens and three white Republicans; estimates of wounded ranged from 48 to more than 100, mostly black. The riot "stemmed from deeply rooted political, social, and economic causes," and took place in part because of the battle "between two opposing factions for power and office." The governor called in federal troops to restore order. The riots in New Orleans and Memphis that year contributed to Congressional passage of Reconstruction legislation and domination of the state by military forces for several years.

Violence continued in the state and city related to each election, particularly the disputed gubernatorial election of 1872. Tensions continued, although the federal government had certified the Republican slate and William Kellogg as governor. In September 1874, in the so-called Battle of Liberty Place, 5,000 members of the White League entered the city in an attempted takeover of state buildings to seat John McEnery, the Democratic candidate for governor. Well-armed, they overwhelmed the 3500 members of the integrated Metropolitan police force, blacks and Republicans, and occupied the state armory and other buildings for three days. Learning that federal troops were arriving by ship, the White League forces retreated from the city. The Louisiana State Museum reports that 11 Metropolitans were killed and 60 wounded, while 16 White Leaguers were killed and 45 wounded.

Despite extremely weak evidence at their trial for the October 1890 murder of NOPD Chief David Hennessey, the acquittal of 11 Italian-Americans resulted in the largest lynching in American history. Between July 24 and July 28, 1900, a violent suspect Robert Charles resisted arrest and killed four police officers and mortally wounded one.

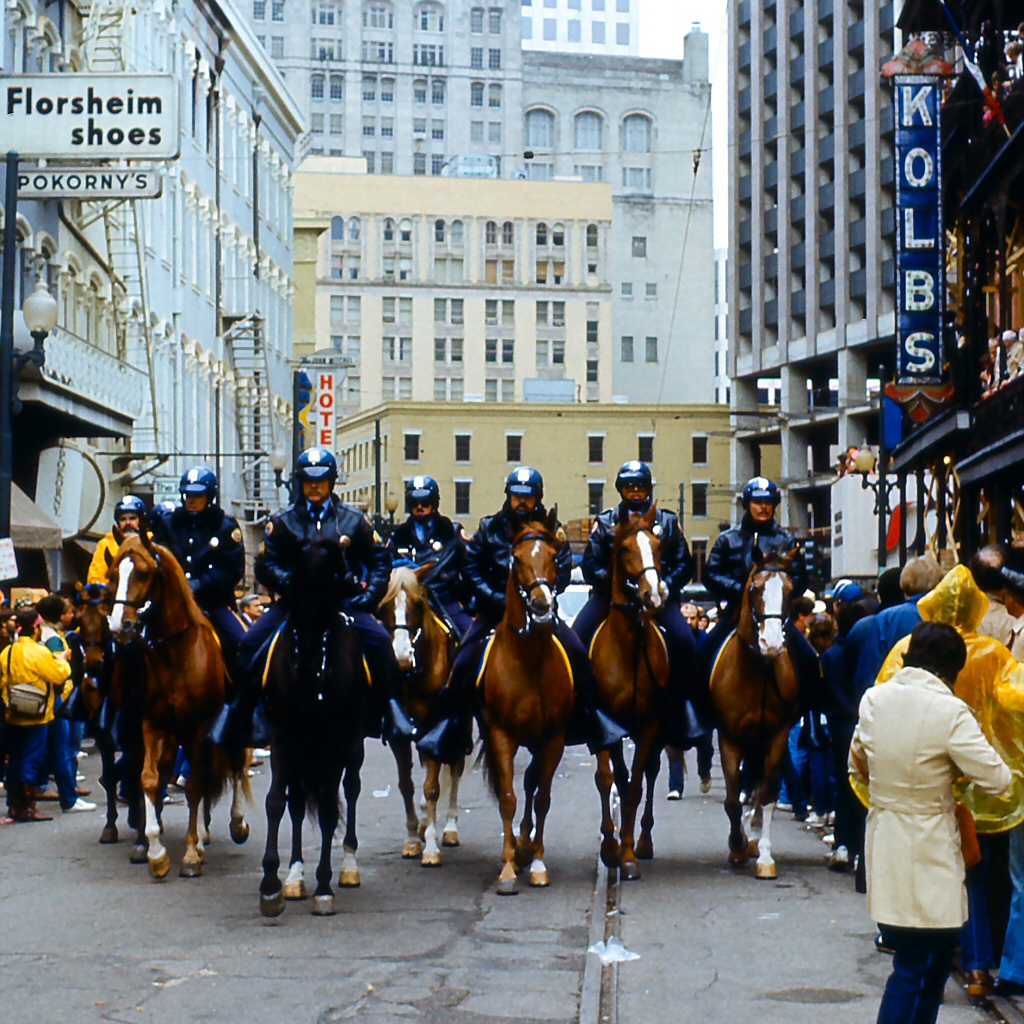
Mounted police during New Orleans Mardi Gras 1984

The NOPD has a long history of civil rights violations, corruption and poor oversight. In 2011, a Department of Justice report found that the NOPD had structural problems that led officers to engage in constitutional violations and discriminate on the basis of race, ethnicity, and LGBT status. The DOJ also found that the NOPD's "culture tolerates and encourages under-enforcement and under-investigation of violence against women." The report concluded, "the NOPD has long been a troubled agency. Basic elements of effective policing— clear policies, training, accountability, and confidence of the citizenry—have been absent for years." As a consequence of the DOJ investigation, the DOJ and the city of New Orleans entered into a consent decree in 2012 where the NOPD had to implement sweeping reforms.

In 2014, Superintendent Ronal W. Serpas retired from the New Orleans Police Department after 25 years of service. Before retiring, Superintendent Serpas attained the civil service rank of major and the appointed position of assistant superintendent of the NOPD. Superintendent Serpas was preceded by Warren J. Riley, who retired with the change of the mayoral administration on May 2, 2010. Riley had been preceded by Eddie Compass and Richard Pennington.

During a press conference on June 25, 2010, Superintendent Serpas announced several reforms to the New Orleans Police Department. Superintendent Serpas reduced the number of deputy superintendents from six to four, and decided that only two of those positions would be held by commissioned officers. Serpas announced that Marlon Defillo, current Assistant Superintendent of the Bureau of Investigations, would take on a new role as the Deputy Chief of the Operations Bureau. Current Deputy Chief Kirk Bouyelas would also take on a new role as Deputy Chief of the Investigative Services Bureau. The two civilian deputy chiefs were to be Ms. Arlinda Westbrook, Deputy Chief (Civilian) in charge of the Public Integrity Bureau, and Ms. Stephanie Landry, Deputy Chief (Civilian) in charge of the Management Services Bureau. Serpas also reduced the rank of eleven appointed Majors to their proper civil service rank of captain. Also in the slew of changes, Serpas reassigned 25 of the current 37 Captains within the department. Superintendent Serpas announced on June 23, 2010, that the majority of his highest-ranking commissioned officers – for example, majors and deputy chiefs – would be summarily demoted effective June 27 to captain, the latter rank thereby returning as the de facto rank of district station commander. As a courtesy, many personnel continue to address district commanders with the honorific "Major." As of July 2010, only two officers – Treadaway and Burkart – retain the rank of major, both of whom were appointed to the position by civil service.

Also in accordance with the above changes, two of Serpas's deputy chiefs swapped responsibilities, while two others were replaced by civilian personnel, bringing the net count of deputy chiefs from six to four.

On March 1, 2011, the New Orleans Civil Service Commission unanimously approved Superintendent Serpas' proposal to create a new pay plan for 16 new "Police Commanders". Serpas originally asked the commission to approve 16 "Colonel's" positions. The new "Commanders" will be third in the command structure of the New Orleans Police Department, only ranked lower than the superintendent and deputy superintendents. In June 2011, 1 additional commander position was created for the Reserve Division. All other personnel, including the two majors, will be subordinate to these individuals. The Police Commanders are responsible for the 17 "Core Components" of the NOPD, including the 8 Patrol Districts and nine other units as noted below.

In mid-2015, press reports indicated that the department was able to clear less than a third of its homicide cases.

Anne Kirkpatrick was appointed interim superintendent of the New Orleans Police Department by Mayor LaToya Cantrell in September 2023, and after confirmation by the city council was sworn in as superintendent on November 1, 2023, the city's first permanent female superintendent. Former Superintendents have included Shaun D. Ferguson, Michael S. Harrison, Ronal W. Serpas, Eddie Compass, Richard Pennington, Arnesta Taylor, Warren Woodfork, Henry Morris, James Parsons, Clarence Giarrusso and Joseph Giarrusso.

== Misconduct ==
=== The Algiers Seven ===
Following the shooting death of officer Gregory Neupert in 1980, New Orleans police tortured witnesses into giving false statements to support arresting James Billy Jr. and Reginald Miles. The two Black men were shot and killed by police in separate raids. Sherry Singleton, the pregnant girlfriend of Miles, was shot and killed while naked in a bathtub during the raid. In another incident related to the investigation, another man Raymond Ferdinand was killed by police.

The only Black homicide detective in the department, Oris Buckner III, reported the crimes to a state assistant district attorney. He alleged three Black men and two white men were tortured in the investigations. He also alleged that Sherry Singleton, James Billy Jr. and Reginald Miles were unarmed when police shot and killed them. Buckner's whistleblowing led to the indictment of seven officers on federal conspiracy charges. Three were convicted, and $2.8 million was awarded to the victims' families in civil suits.

=== Murder of Kim Groves (1994) ===
Officer Len Davis was found guilty and was sentenced to death for ordering hit-man Paul Hardy to murder Kim Groves, a 32-year-old mother of three children. Groves had filed a police brutality complaint against Davis with Internal Affairs the previous day, and a fellow officer tipped Davis about the charge. Hardy was sentenced to death, later resentenced to life in prison.

=== Antoinette Frank (1995) ===
On March 4, 1995, Officer Antoinette Frank robbed a local restaurant, and killed two of the owner's children, as well as her own partner who was working security at the business. She was sentenced to death. In 2023, she was denied clemency and remains on death row.

=== Hurricane Katrina (2005) ===
In the aftermath of Hurricane Katrina in 2005, ninety-one officers resigned or retired and another 228 were investigated for abandoning their posts.

==== Danziger Bridge shootings ====
One report of violence involved a police shooting of six citizens on the Danziger Bridge, which carries the Chef Menteur Highway (US 90) across the Industrial Canal. These citizens were reportedly attacking contractors of the U.S. Army Corps of Engineers involved in the 17th Street Canal repair. Other reports alleged people seeking refuge on the bridge from the flood were fired on without provocation. The shootings left two dead and four injured. Subsequently, seven NOPD officers were indicted on murder charges in connection with the incident known as the "Danziger 7". The case was dropped when the prosecutor who brought the charges, Eddie Jordan, resigned his position following charges of corruption and a judgment against him in a racial discrimination lawsuit. On August 13, 2008, District Judge Raymond Bigelow dismissed the case based on misconduct by the prosecution. On August 5, 2011, a New Orleans Federal Court jury convicted five police officers of a myriad of charges related to the cover-up and deprivation of civil rights.

==== Beating of Robert Davis ====
On October 8, 2005, three officers, Robert Evangelist, Lance Schilling, and Stewart Smith beat up 64-year-old Robert Davis outside a bar in the French Quarter. The beating was videotaped by an AP crew. A few days after the incident, the officers showed up at court and pleaded not guilty. In March 2006, the three officers were convicted. Evangelist was charged with false imprisonment while armed and second-degree battery, Schilling was also charged with second-degree battery, and Smith was charged with simple battery. Both Evangelist and Schilling were charged with battery against Davis, while Smith was charged with battery against an AP reporter. Davis was charged with public intoxication, resisting arrest, battery, and public intimidation.

==== Killing of Henry Glover ====
In late May 2011, Captain Jeff Winn was fired and a number of other officers were reassigned for concealing details concerning the killing of Henry Glover in the aftermath of Hurricane Katrina.

=== U.S. Department of Justice consent decree (2012) ===
The NOPD entered into a consent decree in 2012 with the U.S. Department of Justice. A U.S. DOJ investigation led to a 2011 written report alleging unconstitutional conduct by the NOPD and describing concerns regarding NOPD policies and procedures. On November 20, 2025, the NOPD exited the consent decree.

Killing of Windell Allen

In August 2012, Officer Joshua Colclough pleaded guilty to manslaughter in his killing of Wendell Allen during a drug raid. Wendell Allen was shirtless and unarmed. There were six children in the home during the raid. Colcough was sentenced to four years in jail.

In 2015, the Independent Police Monitor released a report accusing the NOPD of whitewashing the details of the raid and violating the DOJ consent decree. The report also accused the officer investigating the killing of ignoring video evidence and being preoccupied with finding a weapon to link to Allen. The NOPD attempted to discipline an officer for having a body camera on during the raid. The Monitor called for an integrity bureau to be formed to investigate and potentially discipline officers involved with the internal investigation into the shooting. Lon Burns, the Allen family's attorney, called for a federal criminal investigation into the officers.

=== Desmond Pratt ===
In March 2014, Detective Desmond Pratt pleaded guilty to sexual assault of three children. He was sentenced to three years in state custody.

While in prison, Pratt faced FBI scrutiny on his handling of several homicide cases. He was suspected of spoon-feeding witnesses throughout his investigation of the Hankton crime family. One witness said Pratt offered him a firearm and cash to testify that he saw a particular suspect - Edward Allen - at the shooting of Jessie Reed. When FBI agents questioned him, the witness could not identify any of the suspects. In another interview with federal prosecutors, the same witness revised his statement and said he was not at the shooting Pratt was investigating, and that his previous statement was given under the direction of Pratt. Another witness said he was coached by Pratt to identify Allen at a shooting in exchange for leniency on previous, unrelated drug charges. Allen's lawyer stated that Allen was in Texas at the time of the shooting. Federal prosecutors did not rely on the two witnesses in their case against the Hankton gang. Allen spent four years in jail awaiting trial for murder, based on the false testimony given by the witnesses. Charges against him were dropped, his record expunged, and he was not named in other indictments of the gang. Members of the gang were convicted of several murders, including the murder of Jessie Reed. Desmond Pratt has not lost his certification to be a police officer in Louisiana - such decertifications are exceedingly rare.

=== Use of facial recognition technology ===
In 2025, a Washington Post investigation uncovered the use of facial recognition technology on the general public by the NOPD over the course of several years. This action was taken in defiance of a 2022 city ordinance limiting police use of the technology. A network of more than 200 cameras was configured to automatically ping officers' phones when a potential facial match to a suspect was found. The department did not report any of the arrests to New Orleans City Council, as was required by the 2022 ordinance, and used the technology to arrest at least four people for suspected nonviolent crimes. Freed Wessler of the ACLU called this "the first known widespread effort by police in a major US city to use AI to identify people in live camera feeds for the purpose of making immediate arrests." NOPD paused the program due to backlash.

== Rank structure ==
Title	Command	Insignia	Shirt	Address	Salary* (2021)	Number (2020)
Superintendent	Police Department		White	"Superintendent" or "Chief"	2019: 179,348	1
Chief Deputy Superintendent	Bureau		White	"Chief" or "Chief Deputy"	126,066-178,450	1
Deputy Superintendent	Bureau		White	"Chief" or "Deputy Chief"	126,066-178,450	4
Captain	Division, Unit, Section		White	"Captain"	87,502-123,311	18
Lieutenant	Platoon, Division, District Unit, Section		Blue	"Lieutenant"	80,029-112,639	71 (4%)
Sergeant Major Honorary Rank	Sector, Section, Task Force		Blue	"Sergeant Major"	54,421	1
Sergeant	Sector, Section, Task Force		Blue	"Sergeant"	73,262-102,977	195 (15%)
Detective	Investigations, CrimeStoppers	Same as Officers	Plainclothes	"Detective"	57,195-89,130	5.8%
Officer IV	Patrol, Various		Blue	"Officer"	59,695-94,228	72%
Officer III	(see above)		Blue	"Officer"	51,784-86,307	(see above)
Officer II	(see above)		Blue	"Officer"	56,566	(see above)
Officer I	(see above)		Blue	"Officer"	50,449-79,136	(see above)
Reserve	(same as regular Officers)		Blue	"Officer"	Unpaid volunteer	85
Recruit (Field)	N/A		N/A	"Recruit"	40,329	N/A
Recruit (Academy)	N/A		N/A	"Recruit"	40,329	N/A

Notes: *The State of Louisiana provides $6,000 supplemental annual pay after one year of service. Additional annual pay is merited for the following degrees: Associates: $1,000; Bachelor's: $2,000; Graduate: $3,000 (Master's, Doctorate)

STRUCTURE CHANGE AS OF OCTOBER 2019: The position of Commander has been removed since courts have ruled that it was illegally created as an unclassified position where an already existing classified position performed the same duties (Captain). A previous version of the Commander rank was used for Captains placed in command of one of the 8 police districts. Insignia for this rank involved Captain bars modified with a wreath around it.

The civil service rank of Major has been used before in certain high level command positions above the rank of Captain but below the Deputy Superintendents. All officers holding this rank have either retired or been promoted, and no promotions for this position have taken place in more than a decade.

== Demographics ==
Breakdown of the makeup of the rank and file of NOPD:

- Male: 85%
- Female: 15%
- African-American/Black: 51%
- White: 46%
- Hispanic: 2%
- Asian: 1%

== Hurricane Katrina ==
In the aftermath of Hurricane Katrina on August 29, 2005, shooting, violence and other criminal activity became serious concerns to the authorities, who overreacted. While most of the attention of the authorities focused on rescue efforts, some sought to distract attention from the rescue efforts to police the stranded citizens. By August 30, looting had spread throughout the city, often in broad daylight and sometimes in the view of police officers. City Councilwoman Jackie Clarkson told the Associated Press, "The looting is out of control - the French Quarter has been attacked. We're using exhausted, scarce police to control looting when they should be used for search and rescue."

Incapacitated by the breakdown of transportation and communication, police officers did little to stop crime or help citizens left behind. Shopkeepers who remained behind were left to defend their property alone. Although there were some instances of violent armed robbery of nonessential valuable goods, most incidents were of residents simply gathering food, water and other essential commodities from unstaffed grocery stores. There were also reports of looting by some police officers, and the beating of a teacher by three officers was caught on camera. Those three officers were later arrested.

Over 200 NOPD officers deserted the city during the storm. Police chief Warren Riley said 60 officers were fired and 25 were suspended. Most of the suspensions ranged from 30 to 90 days, and most of the officers were exonerated. These officers were given the opportunity to explain their actions before the deputy chief in a tribunal-like hearing, after which 85% of the officers who deserted were terminated. The ones who stayed behind during Katrina were awarded with a Hurricane Katrina lapel pin to be worn on the uniform. It is shaped like the star and crescent badge, with a hurricane emblem in the center of the star.

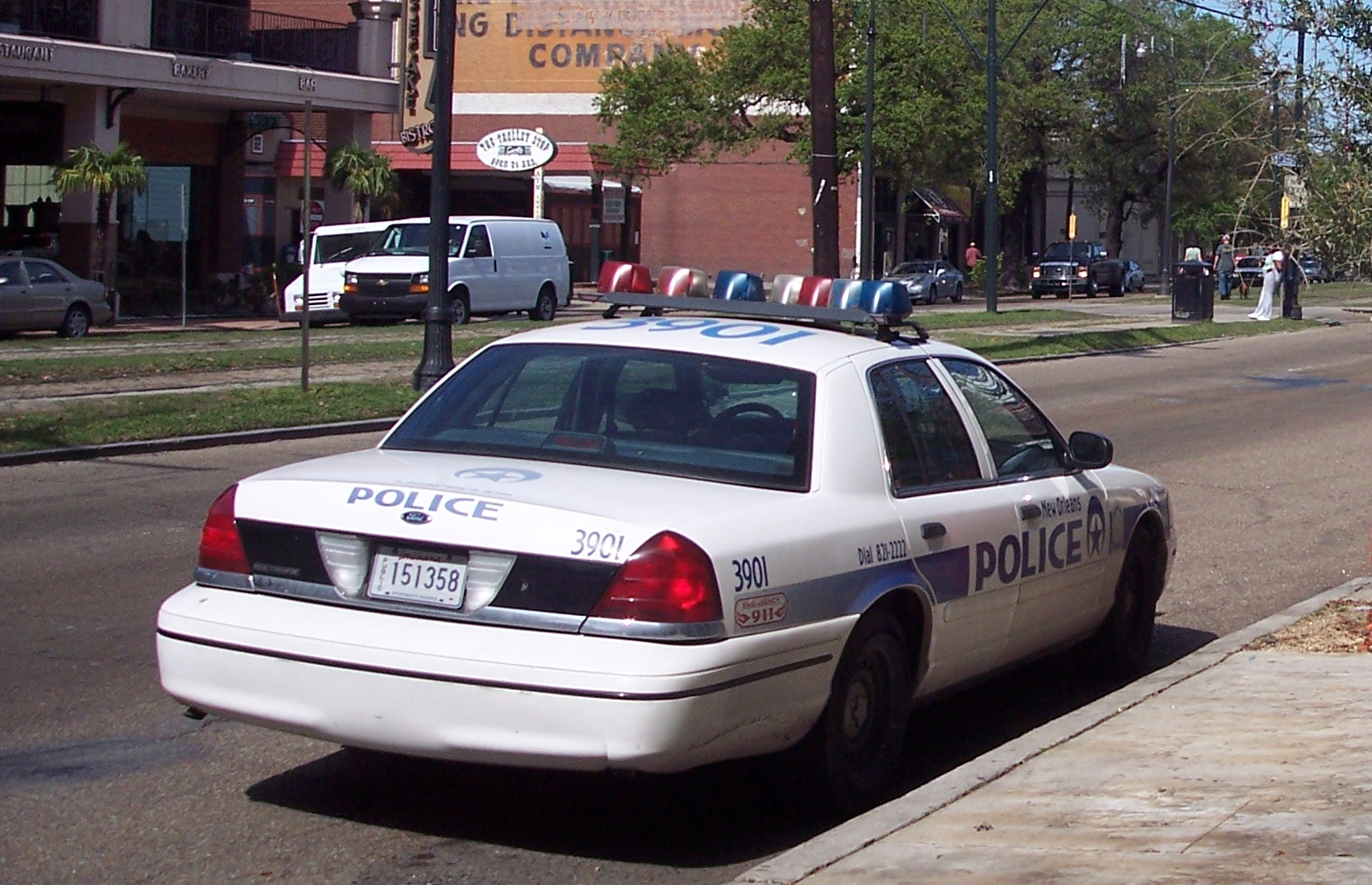
New Orleans Police vehicle in 2009

Prior to Katrina, the New Orleans Police Department was notable as being one of the few major departments in the country whose officers sported powder blue uniform shirts instead of the dark or navy blue shirts used by the majority of police forces nationwide. In the wake of Katrina, however, the department switched to a dark blue uniform shirt in order to avoid potential problems from people, including officers dismissed after the hurricane who may have attempted to illegally pass themselves off as police officers. Beginning on Friday, February 13, 2009, during the annual Mardi Gras celebration, NOPD officers permanently returned to wearing powder blue uniform shirts.

In fall 2007, the Fox television network dramatized post-Katrina New Orleans in the short-lived police drama K-Ville starring Anthony Anderson and Cole Hauser as NOPD detectives working for the Felony Action Squad (FAS).

Reality TV

The NOPD Homicide Unit has been on several Reality TV programs, including “Homicide Squad: New Orleans, The First 48 Hours

== Personnel shortage ==
As of July 2015, the New Orleans Police Department had 1,106 officers on the force. Prior to Hurricane Katrina in 2005, the NOPD had 1,742 commissioned police officers. The NOPD was actively recruiting to increase manpower in the wake of Hurricane Katrina, which preceded an unusually high number of resignations.

The New Orleans Police Department is one of the few police departments in the United States that doesn't require applicants to be American citizens, but have the right to work in the US prior to recruitment.

== Badges ==
New Orleans police officers have worn a unique "Star and Crescent" badge since 1855. While the star is a traditional law enforcement symbol, the crescent symbolizes the crescent shape of the Mississippi River around New Orleans. Patrolmen wear silver badges, while higher-ranking officers, as well as detectives, wear gold badges.

Since the late 19th century, NOPD superintendents have traditionally worn their badges inverted, although not every superintendent has done so.

== Equipment ==
=== Pistols ===
- Glock 22
- Glock 23
- Glock 27

=== Rifles ===
- Bushmaster XM-15

== See also ==
- Death of Henry Glover
- List of law enforcement agencies in Louisiana
- New Orleans security districts
