= Danziger Bridge shootings =

2005 police killings in New Orleans, Louisiana

2005 Danziger Bridge shootings
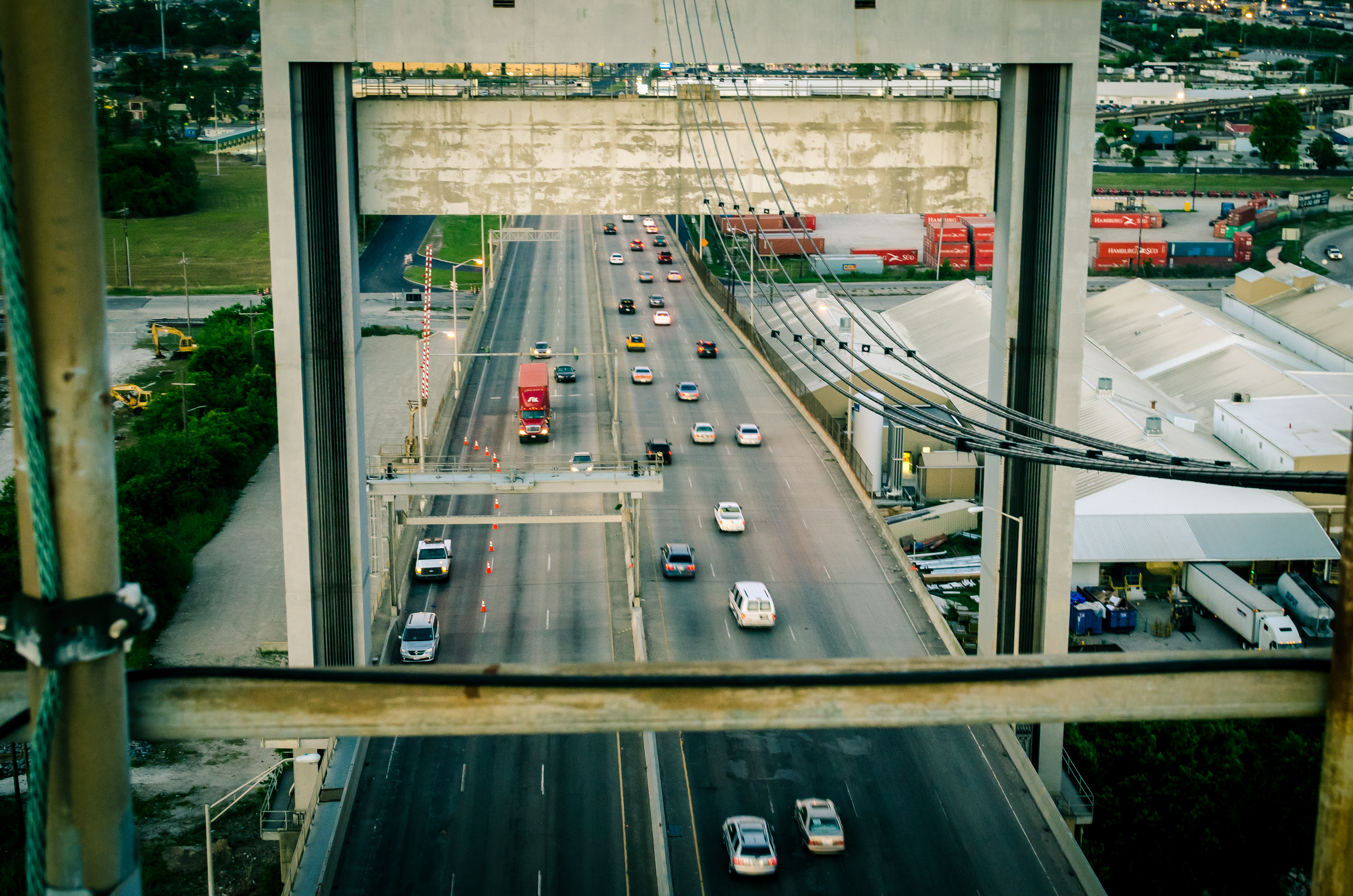
- Danziger Bridge
- Location: 30°0′30″N 90°1′38″W; New Orleans, Louisiana, U.S.
- Date: September 4, 2005 (Central Daylight Time)
- Attack type: Police brutality
- Weapons: Assault rifle, shotgun
- Deaths: 2
- Injuries: 4
- Perpetrators: New Orleans Police Department officers Kenneth Bowen; Robert Faulcon Jr.; Robert Gisevius Jr.; and Anthony Villavaso II.

On the morning of September 4, 2005, six days after Hurricane Katrina struck New Orleans, members of the New Orleans Police Department (NOPD), ostensibly responding to a call from an officer under fire, shot and killed two civilians at the Danziger Bridge: 17-year-old James Brissette and 40-year-old Ronald Madison. Four other civilians were wounded. All of the victims were African-American. None were armed or had committed any crime. Madison, a mentally disabled man, was shot in the back. The shootings caused public anger and further eroded the community's trust in the NOPD and the federal response to Hurricane Katrina overall.

The NOPD attempted to cover up the killings, falsely reporting that seven police officers responded to a police dispatch reporting an officer down, and that at least four suspects were firing weapons at the officers upon their arrival.

On August 5, 2011, a federal jury in New Orleans convicted five NOPD officers of myriad charges related to the cover-up and deprivation of civil rights. An attorney for the U.S. Justice Department described the case as "the most significant police misconduct prosecution [in the U.S.] since the Rodney King beating case". However, the convictions were vacated on September 17, 2013, by U.S. District Judge Kurt Engelhardt due to prosecutorial misconduct, and a new trial was ordered. The Justice Department appealed the decision to vacate the convictions, but a federal appeals court agreed that a new trial was warranted.

On April 20, 2016, the five former officers pleaded guilty to various charges related to the shooting, and in return received reduced sentences ranging from three to twelve years in prison. Three of the officers are white and two are African-American.

== Shooting on the bridge ==
On September 4, 2005, almost a week after Hurricane Katrina struck New Orleans, several New Orleans Police Department (NOPD) officers arrived at the Danziger Bridge. The officers involved included Sgt. Kenneth Bowen, Sgt. Robert Gisevius, Officer Anthony Villavaso and Officer Robert Faulcon. The officers arrived in a Budget rental truck; none of them were in uniform; and they were armed with rifles including AK-47s, at least one of which was unauthorized, and an M4 carbine. A witness, Kasimir Gaston, described the officers as lining up "like at a firing range". The officers opened fire without warning on the Bartholomew family and friend, who had been walking to a grocery store and were then sheltering behind a concrete barrier.

As a result of this initial shooting, 17-year-old James Brissette — a family friend — was killed. Four other civilians were wounded. Susan Bartholomew's arm was partially shot off and later had to be amputated. Her husband, Leonard, was shot in the back, head and foot. The Bartholomews' teenage daughter Lesha was shot four times. Jose Holmes Jr., a friend of Brissette's, was shot in the abdomen, the hand and the jaw.

Two brothers who fled the scene, Ronald and Lance Madison, were pursued down the bridge by officers Gisevius and Faulcon in an unmarked Louisiana State Police vehicle. Faulcon fired his shotgun from the back of the car at Ronald, a developmentally disabled man who later died from his injuries. The autopsy found that Ronald sustained seven gunshot wounds, five of them in his back. Bowen was later convicted of stomping Madison on the back before he died, though this conviction was overturned for lack of physical evidence. Lance was then taken into custody and charged with eight counts of attempting to kill police officers. He was held in custody for three weeks before being released without indictment.

No weapons were recovered at the scene, and both police and civilian witnesses testified that the victims had been unarmed.

== Initial investigation and cover-up ==
The NOPD shooters stated that while approaching the bridge, they had been fired on by civilians and were forced to return fire. Homicide detective Arthur "Archie" Kaufman was made the lead investigator on the case. He was later found guilty of conspiring with the defendants to conceal evidence in order to make the shootings appear justified, including fabricating information for his official reports on the case. NOPD Lieutenant Michael Lohman also encouraged the officers to "provide false stories about what had precipitated the shooting" and plant a firearm near the scene.

== Continued investigation ==
The officers involved in the shooting were taken into custody on January 2, 2007, and were indicted for murder and attempted murder. Gisevius, Bowen, and Villavaso were charged with the first-degree murder of Brissette. Faulcon was charged with the first-degree murder of Madison. Those officers, as well as NOPD officers Michael Hunter, Ignatius Hills and Robert Barrios, were indicted on charges of attempted murder relating to the other four victims. On August 13, 2008, the indictments were dismissed by District Judge Raymond Bigelow due to prosecutorial misconduct. Bigelow found that the prosecutors had wrongly instructed the grand jury, improperly used grand jury testimony against three of the defendants, and divulged grand jury testimony to a witness in the case.

Two weeks later, the FBI and the Civil Rights Division of the U.S. Department of Justice began investigating the shootings. U.S. Attorney Jim Letten of the Eastern District of Louisiana vowed his office would take "as much time and resources as necessary" to resolve the case.

In 2010, the investigation resulted in a series of guilty pleas from participants in the cover-up. On February 24, 2010, Lohman entered a plea of guilty to obstruction of justice in federal court. On March 11, Jeffrey Lehrmann, another former NOPD officer, pleaded guilty to misprision of a felony for failing to report the cover-up. On April 7, Michael Hunter, one of the seven officers originally charged with attempted murder in 2007, pleaded guilty to misprision of a felony and obstruction of justice. Hunter later became a key witness in the case against Bowen, Gisevius, Faulcon, and Villavaso.

On April 16, Barrios was charged with one count of conspiring to obstruct justice, becoming the fourth NOPD officer to be federally charged in the case. He promptly resigned from the force and cooperated with the investigation. A fifth man, Marion David Ryder, a civilian who witnessed the incident and falsely presented himself as an armed law enforcement officer, was also charged in the case. He was accused of lying to the FBI about the event when he claimed that one of the victims had a weapon. Ryder also faced a gun charge since he was a convicted felon. On April 28, Barrios and Ryder both pleaded guilty.

On May 21, Hills was charged by a bill of information with one count of conspiring to obstruct justice and one count of misprision of a felony, becoming the fifth NOPD officer to be federally charged. He had resigned from the force the previous day. A former police officer stated at Hills' trial that he had used a racial slur in later describing how he tried to "pop a round off" at 14-year-old Leonard Bartholomew. Hills and Bartholomew are both African-American.

On July 13, 2010, a federal grand jury indicted Bowen, Gisevius, Faulcon, and Villavaso in connection with the shooting and subsequent cover-up. Additionally, Kaufman and Gerard Dugue, the original investigators in the case, were charged with falsifying reports and false prosecution in the conspiracy to cover up the shooting.

While the federal government lacked jurisdiction to file murder charges in the case, they were able to file charges under federal civil rights statutes intended to enforce Section 1 of the Fourteenth Amendment. Under Title 18 U.S.C. Section 242, "Deprivation of Rights Under Color of Law", anyone who acts, under color of law, to unlawfully deprive a citizen of their right to life, may be sentenced to death.

== Sentencing ==
On September 22, 2010, Lehrmann was sentenced to three years in prison. In 2011, prosecutors asked a judge to reduce his sentence due to his cooperation, but the request was rejected on the grounds that he had already been sufficiently rewarded for his cooperation. Lehrmann was released from prison on April 22, 2014.

On December 1, 2010, Hunter was sentenced to eight years in prison and three years of supervised release. He was also fined $2500.

On September 24, 2011, Ryder was sentenced to eight months in prison, followed by eight months of home detention. He was released from prison on June 1, 2012.

On October 5, 2011, Hills was sentenced to 6.5 years in prison. He was released on July 11, 2017.

On November 2, 2011, Lohman was sentenced to four years in prison and three years of supervised release. Prosecutors asked for a two-year sentence due to his cooperation, but the request was rejected. He was also fined $2500, and ordered to perform 300 hours of community service and meet with NOPD recruit classes to warn other officers who could be tempted to break the law. Lohman was released from prison on June 26, 2015.

On December 1, 2011, Barrios was sentenced to five years in prison. He was released from prison on May 17, 2016.

Guilty verdicts were handed down for Bowen, Gisevius, Faulcon, Villavaso and Kaufman on August 5, 2011.

On April 4, 2012, District Judge Kurt D. Engelhardt sentenced Faulcon to 65 years' imprisonment, Bowen and Gisevius to 40 years, Villavaso to 38 years, and Kaufman to six years. Engelhardt was critical of how the prosecution had been pursued, stating that he was "astonished and deeply troubled" by the number of plea bargains offered to other participants who served as witnesses. Federal prosecutors responded that the plea bargains had been necessary for a difficult case that had been "cold" when they assumed responsibility.

Although federal prosecutors recommended sentence reductions for both Hunter and Hills due to their cooperation, their requests were rejected. In both cases, the presiding judge pointed out that the two were already receiving a great deal of leniency, as both had maliciously fired shots and missed. In Hills's case, the judge also said that he and Villavaso had essentially committed the same crime, but only Villavaso was facing decades in prison. Hunter was released from prison on September 17, 2018, and Hills was released from prison on July 11, 2017.

Defendant	Convictions	Sentence	2016 reductions
Kenneth Bowen	6 counts of deprivation of rights under color of law; 2 counts of using a weapon during commission of a crime of violence; 1 count of conspiracy; 2 counts of obstruction of justice; 1 count of civil rights conspiracy.	40 years in prison	Reduced to 10 years with credit for time served and include five years of supervised release. Released from prison on March 29, 2019.
Robert Faulcon Jr.	6 counts of deprivation of rights under color of law; 3 counts of using a weapon during commission of a crime of violence; 1 count of conspiracy; 2 counts of obstruction of justice; 1 count of civil rights conspiracy.	65 years in prison	Reduced to 12 years with credit for time served and include five years of supervised release. Released from prison on October 2, 2020.
Robert Gisevius Jr.	5 counts of deprivation of rights under color of law; 2 counts of using a weapon during commission of a crime of violence; 1 count of conspiracy; 1 count of obstruction of justice; 2 counts of civil rights conspiracy.	40 years in prison	Reduced to 10 years with credit for time served and include five years of supervised release. Released from prison on March 29, 2019.
Anthony Villavaso	5 counts of deprivation of rights under color of law; 2 counts of using a weapon during commission of a crime of violence; 1 count of conspiracy; 1 count of obstruction of justice; 1 count of civil rights conspiracy.	38 years in prison	Reduced to 7 years with credit for time served and include five years of supervised release. Released from prison on August 16, 2016.
Arthur Kaufman	4 counts of falsifying official records in a federal investigation; 3 counts of false statements; 2 counts of civil rights conspiracy for false persecution; 1 count of conspiracy.	6 years in prison	Reduced to 3 years with credit for time served and include five years of supervised release and 150 hours of community service. Released from prison on December 19, 2017.

Gerard Dugue, who is alleged to have conspired in the cover-up with Kaufman, had his original hearing ruled a mistrial in January 2012. His retrial was postponed to allow for appellate court petitions from both the prosecution and defense, and was set for March 11, 2013, then delayed and set for May 13. It was later delayed indefinitely.

== Retrial ordered ==
On May 18, 2012, a month after they were convicted, the five officers appealed their convictions, arguing that federal prosecutors had engaged in a public relations campaign against their clients by anonymously posting comments on NOLA.com, the website of New Orleans newspaper The Times-Picayune. Principally, the defendants cited comments made by Sal Perricone, the former top trial attorney for the Eastern District (though Perricone was not involved in the prosecution of the Danziger Bridge case). Perricone's activities had been exposed in March 2012 in an unrelated case, and he had resigned soon afterward.

On September 17, 2013, following a year-long probe into the defendants' claims, Judge Engelhardt vacated the convictions of Bowen, Faulcon, Gisevius, Villavaso and Kaufman, and ordered a new trial. In his decision, Engelhardt cited what he called "highly unusual, extensive and truly bizarre actions" by prosecutors; specifically, leaks to certain media outlets and comments that were posted by members of the U.S. Attorney's Office in online forums. The probe revealed that Perricone had made numerous posts attacking the NOPD as early as 2008, and had also made posts urging witnesses to join Lohman in pleading guilty. It also revealed that Perricone and Justice Department official Karla Dobinski had made posts regarding trial testimony while the trial was underway. Dobinski was the head of a Justice Department "taint team" that was to help ensure testimony Bowen gave to the state grand jury wasn't used improperly. The Justice Department appealed Engelhardt's decision to the United States Court of Appeals for the Fifth Circuit, however, a panel of judges upheld the ruling in a 2-1 decision.

While awaiting his retrial, Kaufman successfully sought release on bond since he did not fire a gun in the shootings.

== Guilty pleas ==
On April 20, 2016, five former officers pleaded guilty to charges of deprivation of rights under color of law, obstruction of justice, and conspiracy to obstruct justice. In return, they were sentenced to significantly reduced sentences of three to twelve years in prison, with credit for time served. Gisevius' attorney, Eric Hessler, later said a number of potential witnesses in the planned retrial were too afraid to testify. In addition to the online commenting scandal, several witnesses had been threatened by prosecutors and investigators. According to Hessler, this left no option but to accept a plea bargain. Those who pleaded guilty included the four former officers who took part in the shootings and the former officer who covered up the incident after it happened.

On November 4, 2016, Dugue pleaded guilty in federal court to "a misdemeanor charge of accessory after the fact to deprivation of rights under the color of law". He was sentenced to one year of probation, making him the only NOPD officer who pleaded guilty in the case, but was not sent to prison. Dugue's sentencing marked the end of the criminal cases against the police officers involved in the shootings and cover-up.

== Civil lawsuits and settlement ==
Four civil lawsuits involving eight plaintiffs and seventeen defendants had been filed in federal court but were put on hold until the criminal cases were resolved. Defendants in the civil lawsuits included the City of New Orleans, the NOPD, a former police chief and assistant chief, and Mayor Ray Nagin. The four lawsuits were consolidated before U.S. District Judge Jane Triche Milazzo.

On December 19, 2016, New Orleans Mayor Mitch Landrieu announced a settlement agreement between the city and the families of the Danziger Bridge shootings, plus two other cases involving "lethal confrontations between officers and civilians in the aftermath of Hurricane Katrina. The settlement includes payments for the families of victims killed or injured in the shooting of unarmed civilians on the Danziger Bridge; for the beating death of Raymond Robair, 48, who was killed before the storm; and for the fatal shooting of Henry Glover, who was killed by a police officer standing guard outside an Algiers shopping center."

As part of his news conference announcing the settlement, Mayor Landrieu also issued a verbal apology to the families of the victims, which is considered rare for any city leader to do in cases of proven police brutality. The settlement was also revealed to have totaled $13.3 million.

== Timeline of events ==
Year	Date	Event
2005	September 4	Six days after Hurricane Katrina devastates the area, New Orleans police officers reportedly receive a call from an unidentified person reporting gunfire at Danziger Bridge. Several NOPD officers arrive at the scene and open fire, killing Ronald Madison and James Brissette and seriously wounding four others.
2006	December 28	Seven police officers are charged: police sergeants Kenneth Bowen and Robert Gisevius and officers Robert Faulcon and Anthony Villavaso are charged with first-degree murder. Officers Robert Barrios, Michael Hunter and Ignatius Hills are charged with attempted murder.
2008	August	State charges against the officers are thrown out.
2010	February	Officer Michael Lohman is charged with conspiracy to obstruct justice.
2010	February 24	Lohman pleads guilty.
2010	March 9	Officer Jeffrey Lehrmann is charged with misprision of a felony.
2010	March 11	Lehrmann pleads guilty.
2010	July 12	Four officers are indicted on federal charges of murdering Brissette: Bowen, Gisevius, Faulcon, and Villavaso. Faulcon is also charged with Madison's murder. Bowen, Gisevius, Faulcon, and Villavaso, along with Arthur Kaufman and Gerard Dugue, are charged with covering up the shootings.
2010	April 8	Former officer Michael Hunter pleads guilty in federal court of covering up the police shooting.
2010	April 16	Barrios is charged with conspiracy to obstruct justice, and civilian Marion Ryder is charged with lying to the FBI and illegally possessing a firearm as a convicted felon.
2010	April 28	Barrios and Ryder both plead guilty.
2010	September 22	Lehrmann is sentenced to 4 years in prison.
2010	December 1	Hunter is sentenced to 8 years in prison.
2011	August 5	A jury finds five officers guilty of civil rights violations and obstruction charges: Kenneth Bowen, Robert Gisevius, Robert Faulcon, Anthony Villavaso, and Arthur Kaufman.
2011	September 24	Ryder is sentenced to 8 months in prison, followed by 8 months of home detention.
2011	October 5	Hills is sentenced to 6.5 years in prison for his role in the shootings.
2011	November 2	Lohman is sentenced to 4 years in prison.
2011	December 1	Barrios is sentenced to 5 years in prison.
2012	April 4	A federal judge sentences five former police officers to prison terms ranging from six to 65 years for the shootings of unarmed civilians. Faulcon receives 65 years. Bowen and Gisevius both receive 40 years. Villavaso receives 38 years. Kaufman is sentenced to six years for his role in the cover-up.
2012	June 1	Ryder is released from prison.
2013	March	After a January 2012 mistrial, Dugue's trial is indefinitely delayed.
2013	September 17	Bowen, Gisevius, Faulcon, Villavaso, and Kaufman are awarded a new trial.
2014	April 22	Lehrmann is released from prison.
2015	June 26	Lohman is released from prison.
2016	April 20	Bowen, Gisevius, Faulcon, Villavaso, and Kaufman are granted reduced sentences, based on prosecutorial misconduct.
2016	May 17	Barrios is released from prison.
2016	August 16	Villavaso is released from prison.
2016	November 4	Dugue pleads guilty to a misdemeanor and is sentenced to a year of probation.
2016	December 19	Settlement in civil lawsuits announced by the city.
2017	July 11	Hills is released from prison.
2017	December 19	Kaufman is released from prison.
2018	September 17	Hunter is released from prison.
2019	March 29	Bowen and Gisevius are released from prison.
2020	October 2	Faulcon is released from prison.

== See also ==
- Crime in Louisiana
- Effects of Hurricane Katrina in New Orleans
- Killing of Henry Glover
- Lists of killings by law enforcement officers in the United States
- List of unarmed African Americans killed by law enforcement officers in the United States
