= Robert Davis (New Orleans) =

American teacher (born 1941)

Robert Davis (born 1941) is a retired elementary school teacher and resident of New Orleans who was detained, arrested, and beaten by four police officers on October 8, 2005, on suspicion of public intoxication. Davis has denied intoxication, but he resisted arrest by not allowing himself to be handcuffed and was beaten, which was filmed by the members of the Associated Press. A fifth officer was charged with assaulting an Associated Press producer.

== Incident ==
Davis is an African American and the two officers who beat him (while two others held him down) are white, adding to the controversy of this case. Davis, who was charged with public intoxication, resisting arrest, battery, and public intimidation, pleaded not guilty on October 12, 2005. The officers have also been charged with battery and were accused of using extreme force. Regarding the charge of public intoxication, Davis said, "I haven't had a drink in 25 years."

Davis said he returned to view and possibly rebuild his family's six properties that were destroyed by Hurricane Katrina. He went out during the night to buy cigarettes in the French Quarter and asked a mounted officer when a curfew would go into effect that night.

This other guy interfered and I said he shouldn't. I started to cross the street and... bam... I got it. ... All I know is this guy attacked me and said, 'I will kick your ass,' and they proceeded to do it.

— Robert Davis

As Davis was arrested, Associated Press producer Rich Matthews was jabbed in the stomach and shoved into a police cruiser by a third officer who shouted, "I've been here for six weeks trying to keep fucking alive. Fucking go home."

== Aftermath ==
Officers Lance Schilling, Robert Evangelist, and Stuart Smith were released on bond after appearing before a judge to make their not guilty pleas.

The police union and a lawyer for the accused officers, challenge Davis' version of the events. According to their account, a drunken Davis walked into a police horse while asking about the curfew, and belligerently resisted officers who confronted him. Davis' mugshot shows stitches beneath his left eye and a bandaged left hand, and sustained injuries. On October 12, 2005, Davis revisited the site saying, "Is that my blood? It must be. I didn't know I was bleeding that bad."

The policemen's trial was set for January 11, 2006. Davis' trial began on January 18. The police chief in charge of the investigation, Warren Riley, also an African American, claimed that he did not believe race was an issue in the beating. Charges against Davis were dropped in April 2006.

Stuart Smith was the officer charged with assaulting the AP producer; he was suspended for 120 days, while Robert Evangelist and Lance Schilling were fired for their participation in the beating. Two of the men involved in the incident were not New Orleans police officers, but federal agents, who were not indicted by their parent agency for their involvement.

Lance Schilling was found dead on June 10, 2007, from a "gunshot wound to the roof of the mouth" that was apparently self-inflicted.

On July 24, 2007, Officer Robert Evangelist was cleared of all charges by Judge Frank Marullo, who was later quoted in reference to the trial, "I didn't even find this a close call." The deciding factor was the video evidence that showed Davis struggling for several minutes while police tried to detain him. "This event could have ended at any time if the man had put his hands behind his back," the judge concluded.
