= Eddie Compass =

American law enforcement officer

Superintendent of the New Orleans Police Department
- In office May 24, 2002 – September 27, 2005
- Preceded by: Richard Pennington
- Succeeded by: Warren Riley

Personal details
- Born: Edwin P. Compass III c. 1959 New Orleans, Louisiana, U.S.
- Education: Loyola University New Orleans
- Occupation: Law enforcement officer, security executive

Edwin P. Compass III (c. 1959), known as Eddie Compass, is an American law enforcement and public safety executive. He spent 26 years with the New Orleans Police Department (NOPD), rising from patrol officer to superintendent, a post he held from 2002 to 2005. An advocate of community policing, he led the department through Hurricane Katrina and its aftermath. He has since worked in security and emergency management across Louisiana education, and in 2026 was named executive director of safety and emergency preparedness at LSU New Orleans.

== Early life and police career ==
Compass grew up in the Sixth Ward of New Orleans and graduated from St. Augustine High School. He entered the NOPD academy in 1979 at the age of 20, telling instructors that his ambition was to become chief of police.

Over the following two decades he served as a patrol officer, narcotics detective, community policing officer and district commander. He held the rank of captain and commanded the First Police District for most of the five years preceding his appointment as superintendent. A crime-reduction program he developed there was credited with a sharp decline in homicides and was described as an international model.

Compass received a master's degree from Loyola University New Orleans on May 18, 2002, three days before Mayor Ray Nagin named him police chief. Higher education standards for the senior ranks, introduced during the Morial–Pennington administration, were among the police reforms institutionalized in that era and were a factor in advancement to deputy chief positions.

== Superintendent of Police (2002–2005) ==
Nagin selected Compass from a field of four NOPD commanders to succeed the outgoing superintendent, Richard Pennington. A 23-year veteran of the department, Compass was sworn in on May 24, 2002, at the age of 42. He identified drug activity in the city's housing developments as an early priority.

As superintendent he favored a community policing model, directed federal resources toward areas of concentrated violent crime, and patrolled the city himself. His deputy, Assistant Superintendent Warren Riley, favored an aggressive patrol strategy, and the two approaches were characterized by criminologists as competing doctrines within the department.

=== Hurricane Katrina ===
Katrina and the subsequent levee failures left the 1,700-member department operating without functioning precincts, communications or resupply. Hundreds of officers abandoned their posts, and two officers whom Compass described as friends, including Sgt. Paul Accardo, died by suicide.

Compass remained in the city throughout and publicly defended the officers who stayed. Speaking to reporters and, by cellular phone while on patrol, to NPR, he said the department had been undermanned and underequipped and had held the city together for six days without food, water, ammunition or sanitation, with officers working extended shifts and sleeping in their cars. He argued that no police department had previously been asked to do what his had been asked to do. David Benelli, president of the rank-and-file officers' union, declined to criticize him, saying that the department's not losing control of the city was a testament to his leadership. Compass also announced that he was convening a tribunal to review the cases of 249 officers who had left their posts without permission during the storm.

In the days after landfall, Compass relayed to the press reports of violence at the Superdome and the Ernest N. Morial Convention Center that had been passed to him by officers and evacuees, including in an appearance on The Oprah Winfrey Show. Investigations weeks later found that many of these accounts could not be substantiated. The reports had circulated widely among officials, evacuees and news organizations during the communications blackout; The Times-Picayune editor Jim Amoss noted that the press had repeated them as well and that officials were relying on accounts from the ground. Compass said he had believed the information credible when he received it. In the 2006 Spike Lee documentary When the Levees Broke, he said that in hindsight he had heightened public fear, and disclosed that one report brought to him had claimed his own daughter was among the victims.

Firearm seizures in the flooded city became the subject of litigation brought by the National Rifle Association and Second Amendment Foundation, which the city settled in 2008. Compass has said that he never suspended the right to bear arms and that weapons were not taken from anyone able to document lawful possession, noting that departmental computer systems were inoperable at the time.

=== Departure ===
Compass announced his departure on September 27, 2005, citing 26 years of service and saying that a leader must know when to hand over the reins. Nagin called it a sad day for the city and said Compass was leaving the department in good shape. Compass has said that he received a message from the mayor instructing him to prepare an exit plan, and that he was forced out rather than having resigned voluntarily.

== Later career ==
Compass became executive director of security for the New Orleans public school system. NPR, profiling him in the role, reported that he remained widely recognized in the city as "the chief" and that residents interviewed continued to regard his relationship with the community as his defining strength. He described the position as work he was meant to do.

He subsequently served as chief of security for Louisiana's Recovery School District, directing security operations for dozens of campuses across the state, and as chief of campus security at Delgado Community College. He also spent nearly two decades in operations and security leadership at the University of New Orleans Lakefront Arena, overseeing security and event operations for concerts, athletic events and other large public gatherings.

Over the course of his career he has led emergency preparedness initiatives, developed active shooter response protocols that have been adopted as models by school systems, directed security planning for major national events, and built partnerships among local, state and federal agencies.

In August 2026, LSU New Orleans appointed Compass executive director of safety and emergency preparedness, with responsibility for campus security operations, emergency management, environmental health and safety, laboratory safety, OSHA compliance, event safety coordination and oversight of the University Police Department. Announcing the appointment, interim chancellor Jeanette Weiland said the university had sought leaders demonstrating integrity, sound judgment and accountability. Compass said that public safety is most effective when it forms part of an organization's culture rather than serving only as a response to emergencies.
