= 2006 New Orleans mayoral election =

- April 22, 2006 (first round); May 20, 2006 (runoff)
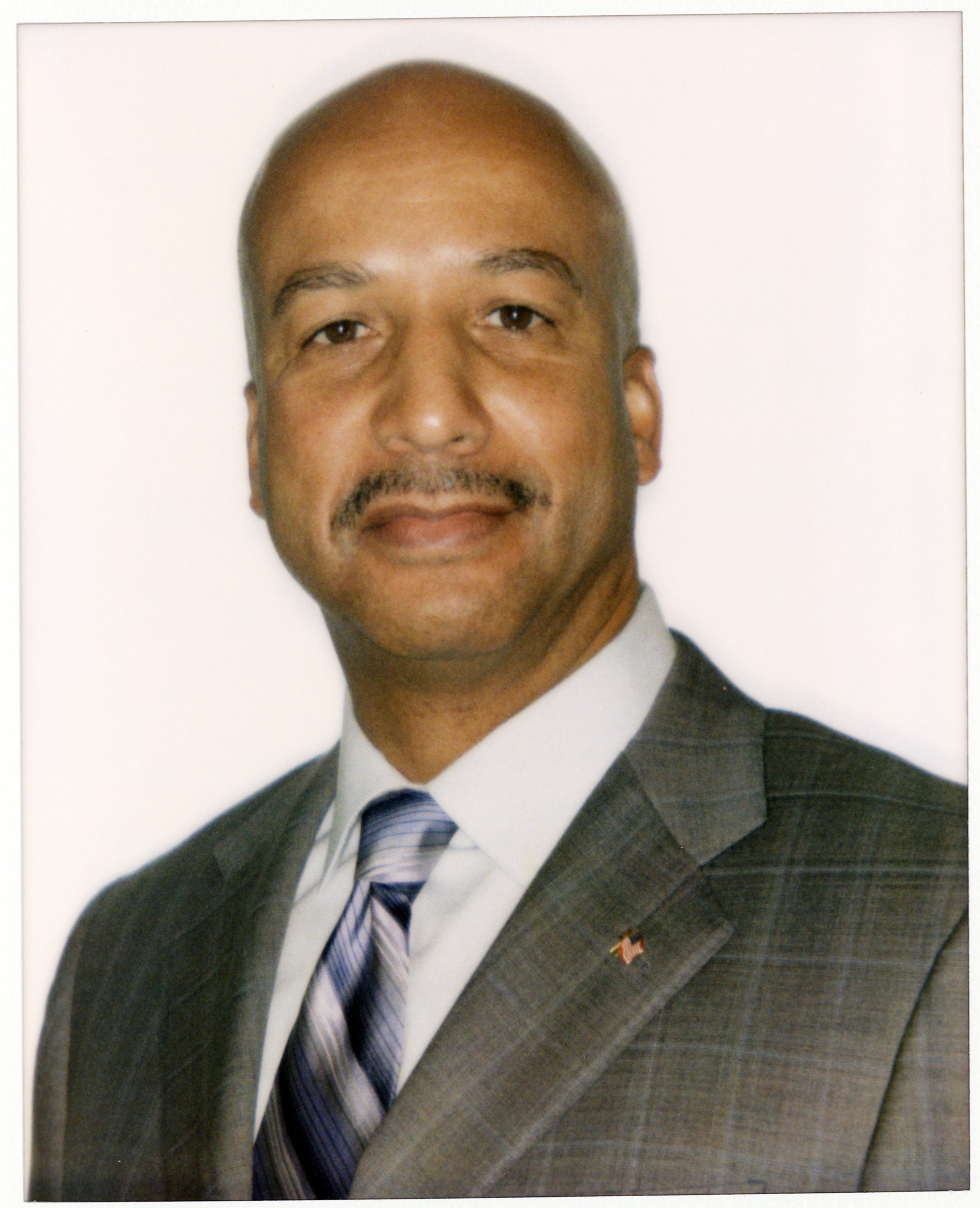

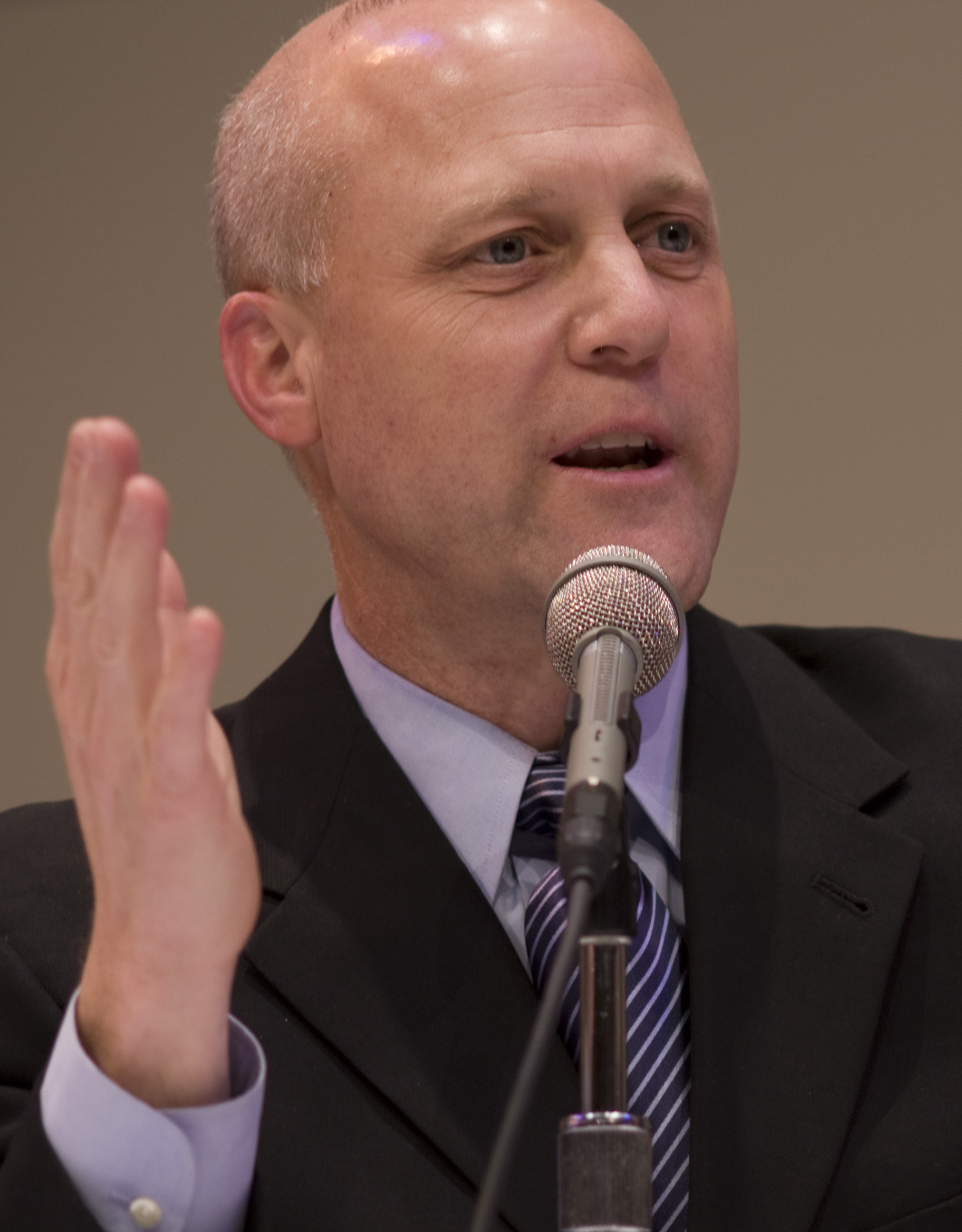

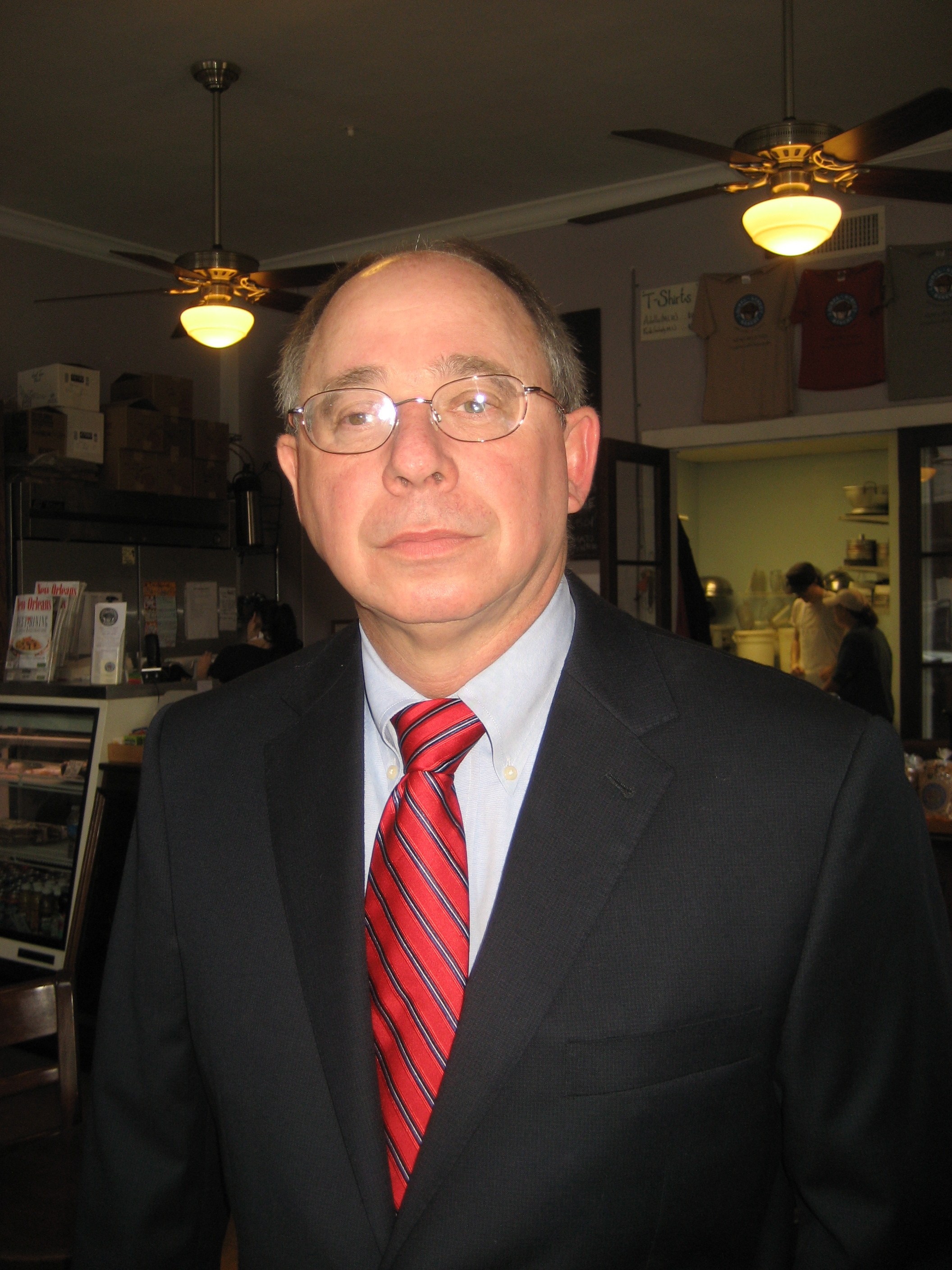
Candidate	Ray Nagin	Mitch Landrieu
Party	Democratic	Democratic
First round	41,561; 38.36%	31,551; 29.12%
Runoff	59,460; 52.35%	54,131; 47.65%
Candidate	Ron Forman	Rob Couhig
Party	Democratic	Republican
First round	18,764; 17.32%	10,312; 9.52%
Runoff	Eliminated	Eliminated
Results by precinct:
Nagin:
50–60%
60–70%
70–80%
80–90%
>90%
Landrieu:
50–60%
60–70%
70-80%
80-90%
Tie:
(between Nagin and Landrieu)
Mayor before election
Ray Nagin
Democratic
Elected mayor
Ray Nagin
Democratic

The first round of the New Orleans mayoral election of 2006 took place on April 22, 2006; a runoff between incumbent Mayor Ray Nagin and Louisiana Lieutenant Governor Mitch Landrieu took place on May 20, resulting in reelection for Mayor Nagin. The Mayor of New Orleans is the top official in New Orleans' mayor-council system of government.

== Background ==
Elections in Louisiana, with the exception of presidential elections, follow a variation of the open primary system called the jungle primary. All candidates, including those running with a political party and independents, are listed on one ballot. Voters may vote for any candidate regardless of what party they are registered.

If no candidate wins a majority (50 percent plus one vote) in the first round, a second round (run-off) is then held between the top two candidates, who may be members of the same party. As this occurred, the runoff took place on May 20, 2006.

This election was previously scheduled to be held on 4 February 2006 (along with elections for other local offices, including City Council members) but was postponed due to the devastation in the aftermath of Hurricane Katrina (see: Effect of Hurricane Katrina on New Orleans), and the fact that large numbers of New Orleanians are displaced and still unable to return home. Since this election would determine who would lead the city during its rebuilding process, the election was widely seen as one of the most important elections in the history of New Orleans and it was watched nationally to a degree uncommon for most mayoral races.

== Candidates ==
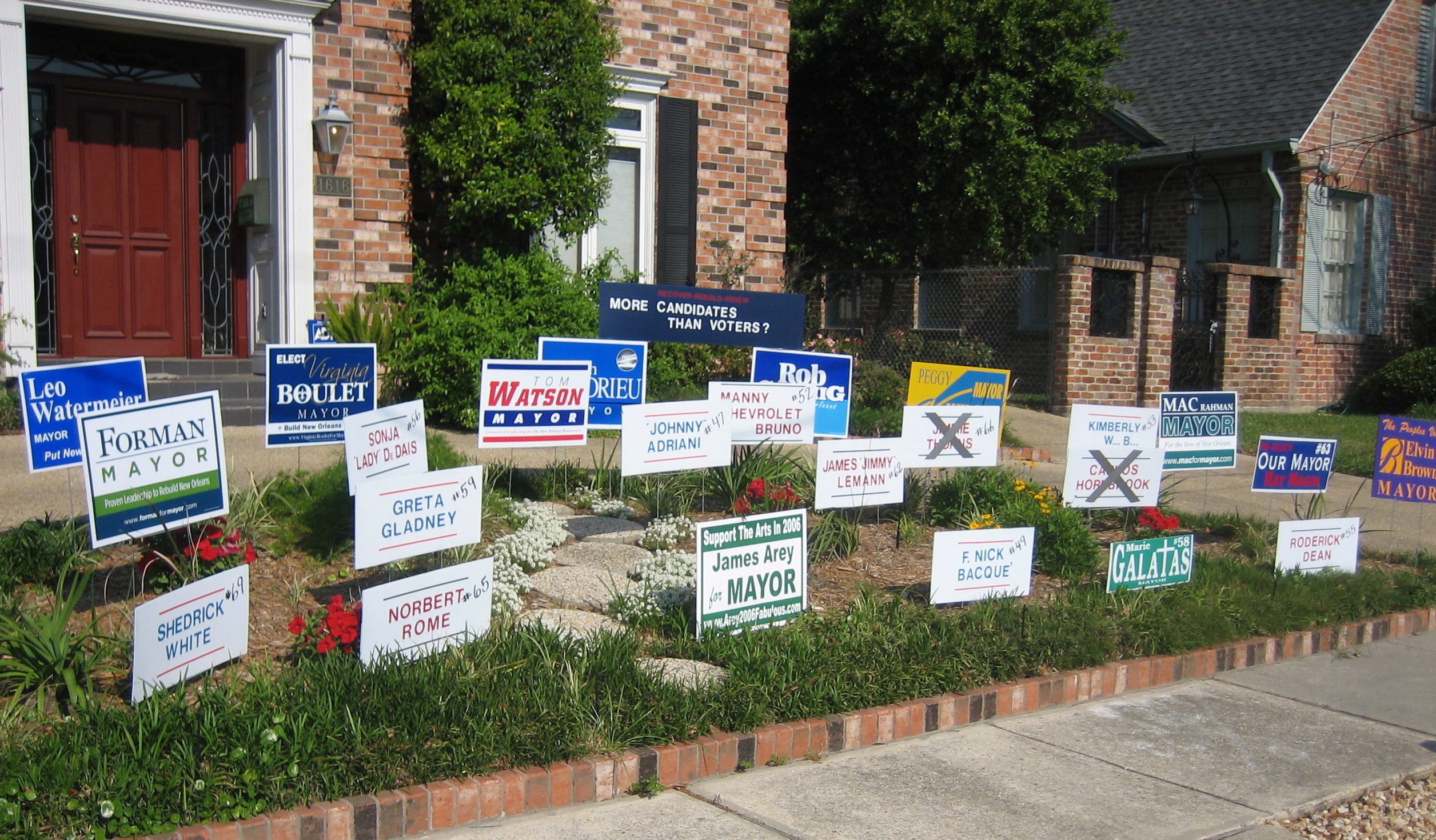
New Orleans house with a collection of signs for all the mayoral candidates, with the comment "More candidates than voters?"

In the primary campaign, incumbent mayor Ray Nagin faced a record 21 challengers for his position. Many were political novices without significant financial backing. In addition to Nagin, two candidates in particular were considered by political pundits to be "major candidates" because of their name recognition and financing—Ron Forman and Mitch Landrieu. Others preferred not to distinguish between 'major' and 'minor' candidates, noting that, in the 2002 election, these same pundits considered Nagin a long-shot. The top-financed candidate in that election, two-term city councilman Troy Carter, came in fifth.

=== Candidates in descending order of votes received ===
Ray Nagin
Incumbent mayor Ray Nagin sought re-election. Before Katrina, he was widely perceived as having a very high chance of re-election, but the new political climate left his level of support uncertain. Nagin faced strong criticism of his handling of Hurricane Katrina and its aftermath. Many middle- and upper-class white voters, who supported him in the 2002 election and were vital to his success in that contest, were alienated by his 'chocolate city' speech in January 2006, and very few white voters supported him this time. The elements of the business community that were such an important part of his support base in 2002 mainly supported other candidates, while Nagin's business-oriented plans for reconstruction in New Orleans have alienated many voters. Moreover, the city's black majority has been significantly reduced, and many in the city's black community were critical of Nagin even before the hurricane, citing amongst other issues the fact that he was known to have conservative politics and had supported Republican candidates in the past. Nagin campaigned on his experience as mayor and in defense of his record, arguing that New Orleans needs experienced leadership in a crisis situation. After being defeated in the primary, Rob Couhig, Virginia Boulet, and Tom Watson endorsed Nagin in the runoff.

Mitch Landrieu
Louisiana Lieutenant Governor Mitch Landrieu, son of New Orleans's last white mayor Moon Landrieu and brother of Senator Mary Landrieu, announced his candidacy on February 21, after months of public speculation. Landrieu ran for mayor once before, in the 1994 election, but finished third and was defeated by Marc Morial. With the city's black majority much reduced after the hurricane, Landrieu was generally believed to have a stronger chance of victory this time around. Given that he and his family have long been known as supporters of civil rights, he was seen as having a better chance of attracting a significant African American vote than some other white candidates. While campaigning, Landrieu repeatedly criticized the rebuilding plan of Nagin's Bring New Orleans Back Commission, arguing that each neighborhood needs freedom to determine its own rebuilding process, and faulted Nagin for not doing more to pressure the federal government for information and funding. Landrieu was endorsed by The Gambit, New Orleans CityBusiness, and The Louisiana Weekly newspapers. After coming in third in the primary, Ron Forman endorsed Landrieu in the runoff.

Ron Forman
Ron Forman has been president and CEO of the Audubon Nature Institute, which runs the Audubon Zoo and the Aquarium of the Americas, since 1977. Forman supported Nagin in his 2002 electoral campaign, but broke with him after Katrina as buzz began to build around Forman as a potential challenger to Nagin. After much speculation, he formally announced his candidacy on February 14. A former president of the Chamber of Commerce, he has a high profile in the city's business community and had strong support in the corporate world and among wealthy New Orleanians. He had a large campaign war-chest and raised $2.1 million as of April 14, more money than any other candidate. Forman proposed the creation of four deputy mayor posts, two white and two black, in an effort to promote better race relations. Forman was endorsed by the Times-Picayune newspaper.

Rob Couhig
Republican lawyer and businessman Rob Couhig formerly owned the New Orleans Zephyrs, a minor league baseball team. His campaign platform included plans for a Rudy Giuliani-style crackdown on crime, selling off public hospitals, extensive bulldozing of blighted property, and a plan to retract the city's footprint by restricting rebuilding in the Lower Ninth Ward and New Orleans East. Couhig entered the race in mid-February by running the campaign's first television attack ads, mocking the leading candidates. In debates and public appearances, Couhig was one of the more combative candidates, regularly criticizing the front-runners.

Virginia Boulet
Corporate lawyer Virginia Boulet began her campaign in early February due to her dissatisfaction with Nagin's recovery plans. She proposed financing the city budget through a bond issue, and instituting universal health insurance as a way to lure displaced residents back to the city. She repeatedly emphasized the need to rebuild the wetlands east and southeast of New Orleans in order to protect the city from hurricanes.

Tom Watson
Pastor Tom Watson, an influential leader of the Greater New Orleans Coalition of Ministers, is active in programs to help youths in the city's poor neighborhoods. Watson has long been a critic of Nagin, and after declaring his candidacy on February 17 he became Nagin's first African American challenger. Watson focused his campaign on the return of the New Orleans diaspora still scattered around the country after Hurricane Katrina, a constituency he says other candidates have neglected. He also planned to address the racial and class divisions that impede the city's recovery and to reform the NOPD, which he characterizes as "corrupt and brutal." He also proposed a cap on rents, which have skyrocketed since Katrina.

Kimberly Williamson Butler
Clerk of Criminal Court Kimberly Williamson Butler made a surprise announcement on March 3 of her mayoral candidacy on the courthouse steps to reporters—who were there to cover her surrendering herself on an arrest warrant for contempt of court.

Peggy Wilson
Peggy Wilson was a city councilwoman from 1986 to 1998. One of only two Republicans running, she was a favorite of some old line conservatives. Wilson was also one of the few white candidates willing to discuss the city's changed racial demographics, openly stating that the shift in population after Katrina is part of the reason she decided to enter the race in November. She campaigned on a proposal to declare New Orleans a 'tax-free city', financed with a federal bond issue, and attracted controversy with her vocal plans to keep "gangbangers" and "welfare queens" from returning to New Orleans.

Johnny Adriani
Johnny Adriani is a criminal defense paralegal who ran his campaign from his car after losing his home to flooding.

Manny "Chevrolet" Bruno
Manny "Chevrolet" Bruno is an out-of-work actor who said he was running because "I need the job". He amused election watchers—in the current campaign and in his 2002 bid for mayor (under the slogan "A troubled man for troubled times") —with his deadpan, self-effacing humor. His campaign signs had a cartoon of a cocktail glass surrounded by the words "Good Cheap Fast" and the slogan "Troubled Now, More Than Ever".

James Arey
WWNO radio personality James Arey was one of two candidates who expressed intent to run before Hurricane Katrina. Some saw Arey's candidacy as a platform to draw attention to the importance of the arts in New Orleans' culture and recovery. In 1998, Arey was a 5-time champion on the game show Jeopardy!, winning $42,802 and a new car.

Greta Gladney
Greta Gladney, a Lower Ninth Ward activist, ran due to threats to neighborhoods, community-based programs, and public schools in the wake of Katrina. Gladney is a member of ACORN and the Frederick Douglass Community Coalition, and executive director of The Renaissance Project.

Marie Galatas
Marie Galatas, a pastor and civil rights activist from the 7th Ward of New Orleans who founded the Grass Roots Organization for Women and who has hosted a number of radio and cable TV programs.

Leo Watermeier
Former state Representative Leo Watermeier, a French Quarter activist, first announced his candidacy in 2004. He was one of only two candidates who had already announced their intentions to challenge Nagin's bid for reelection before Hurricane Katrina.

Shedrick White
Shedrick White, a student at the Southern University at New Orleans who has worked on conflict resolution with public housing residents.

Sonja "Lady" DeDais
Sonja "Lady" DeDais wanted to "take care of the city" and to develop a new evacuation plan without excessive military involvement. She was known for her flamboyant hats.

James Lemann
James Lemann, a former aircraft mechanic and community activist, proposed increased use of solar power and development of a research institute to study meteorites.

F. Nick Bacque
F. Nick Bacque, a real estate financial worker and medical student at Tulane University, tried to get youth involved in the city's reconstruction.

Elvin Brown
Elvin Brown, the CEO of an elderly care facility, described himself as "the people's voice."

Mac Rahman
Mac Rahman owner of an Asian-Creole restaurant in the Carrollton neighborhood, wanted to consolidate the city's assessors offices and to make the city's government as efficient as that of Jefferson Parish.

Norbert Rome
Norbert Rome, a community activist, formerly of the Gert Town neighborhood.

Roderick Dean
Roderick Dean proposed taking up offers of international aid to New Orleans, and seeking corporate sponsorship of Carnival.

Jimmie Thorns, Jr.
Jimmie Thorns, Jr., a real estate appraiser and consultant who had served as chairman of the Black Economic Development Council and the Urban League. Thorns dropped out of the race on March 31 and endorsed Mitch Landrieu.

== Issue of displaced voters ==
At the time of the election, at least two-thirds of the city's residents were still displaced, scattered across the country facing serious obstacles (such as severely damaged houses, neighborhoods without reliable utilities, and financial constraints) to returning. The state legislature passed legislation allowing for absentee voting in polling places in 10 parishes, but there was still concern about the difficulty displaced residents outside Louisiana may have faced in placing their votes. With the majority of the displaced residents staying outside Louisiana and outside the reach of local New Orleans media outlets, their ability to obtain information about the campaign remained open to question.

No reliable figures currently exist for the size and ethnic makeup of New Orleans's current population. It is widely recognized, however, that the current demographics of New Orleans are on average more white and more affluent than they were before Katrina. This made it very hard to predict the outcome of the election. This new demographic reality encouraged many candidates that might not have considered entering the race before the storm. New Orleans has not had a white mayor since 1978, but a large number of candidates - including every candidate considered to have a 'serious' chance of winning other than incumbent Nagin - were white.

On February 24, a federal judge rejected a lawsuit by the NAACP, ACORN, and the Grassroots Legal Network seeking to set up physical polling places in cities like Houston, Texas and Atlanta, Georgia, which have large numbers of displaced New Orleanians. An appeal in this case was likewise rejected on March 27.

On March 25, a study of change-of-address forms found that 80 percent of the city's registered voters either did not file for a change of address or have listed a new address within the greater New Orleans area. If accurate, these findings would indicate that with most voters still in the area, absentee voters would not be as significant a factor in the election as previously believed. The NAACP and other civil rights groups disputed these findings, arguing that they do not take into account people who are dispersed but have not filled out change-of-address paperwork.

On April 1, thousands of civil rights demonstrators marched across the Crescent City Connection calling for satellite voting locations to be set up outside the state to give displaced New Orleanians the same voting rights as those who have returned to the city. The march - the largest New Orleans has seen in several years - was organized by Jesse Jackson and the Rainbow/PUSH Coalition, and prominent speakers included Bill Cosby, former mayor Marc Morial, Al Sharpton, U.S. Rep. Bill Jefferson, and Mayor Ray Nagin.

Satellite voting stations opened on April 10 in nine parishes in order to allow displaced New Orleans residents to cast votes. ACORN organized buses to transport out-of-state displaced voters to these stations, which remained open until April 15. A total of 10,585 votes were cast at these satellite polls in the five allotted days.

== Campaign timeline ==
=== Primary ===
December, January, and February saw intense speculation among political observers as to who would emerge as Nagin's main rival in the upcoming campaign. It was expected that either Ron Forman or Mitch Landrieu would run with the support of much of the city's business and political communities. After months of private discussion and negotiation, both candidates decided to run; an unexpected development which had the potential to split the support of voters opposed to Nagin.

On January 24, Louisiana Governor Kathleen Blanco ended months of public debate and legal wrangling by signing Secretary of State Al Ater's plan to reschedule the primary election for April 22 and the runoff for May 20.

Ron Forman officially declared his candidacy on February 14 at the Audubon Tea Room in front of a crowd of business leaders and other supporters.

On February 22, Mitch Landrieu made his long-anticipated official campaign announcement, with players in the city's hospitality and tourism industry and powerful real estate developer Pres Kabacoff featured prominently among his supporters.

On February 23, Nagin held a public reconciliation with Bishop Paul Morton, a prominent black pastor who publicly criticized Nagin in 2004 for failing to provide enough city contracts to black-owned businesses, and had called Nagin "a white man in black skin."

On February 24, the first public poll of the election was released. Conducted between January 26 and February 13, the poll showed Mitch Landrieu leading with 35% of the vote and Ray Nagin trailing with 25%. Ron Forman received 9% and Peggy Wilson stood at 7%. However, only residents who had returned to the city were polled; without the input of absentee voters, the pollster acknowledged that the results could not be considered representative.

March 2 saw the release of the election's second poll, conducted by CNN, USA Today, and Gallup. 19% of those polled said they would definitely vote for Ray Nagin, while 44% said they would definitely not vote for him. Mitch Landrieu received 18% definite support, while 29% would definitely not vote for him. Ron Forman stood with 12% of those polled certain to vote for him, and 35% unwilling to consider voting for him. Peggy Wilson received the definite support of 7%, and 62% would not vote for her. 4% would definitely vote for Tom Watson, while 63% would not vote for him. Other candidates were not mentioned in the poll, and only voters currently living within the city were polled.

March 3 was the deadline for mayoral candidates to file their qualification papers. In addition to the expected candidates, a large number of newly announced candidates emerged. The most notable surprise announcement was that of Clerk of Criminal Court Kimberly Williamson Butler, who emerged from a week of hiding from an arrest warrant for contempt of court in order to announce her candidacy for mayor. A record number of 23 candidates have declared their intention to challenge Nagin.

On March 4 Nagin appeared before an audience of New Orleans evacuees at an event organized by the NAACP, where he made the statement that "there was all this talk about this being an opportunity to change New Orleans forever and maybe everybody shouldn't come back, and maybe this is an opportunity to kind of change New Orleans and go back to what it used to be. I have 23 candidates running for mayor and very few of them look like us. There's a potential to be a major change in the political structure of New Orleans." Some perceived these comments to be a divisive follow-up to his "Chocolate City" remarks, while others point out that the fact that Nagin is the only major African-American candidate in a field of 23 is a sign of the demographic shift in a city that was over two-thirds black before Katrina.

Newly announced candidate Kimberly Williamson Butler, the Clerk of Criminal Court, was jailed for contempt of court on March 6 after a court appearance in which she refused to admit guilt and instead criticized the judges.

The first mayoral debate of the campaign was held on March 7 at Loyola University. The debate was attended by Ray Nagin and 8 of his challengers: James Arey, Virginia Boulet, Rob Couhig, Ron Forman, Mitch Landrieu, Leo Watermeier, Tom Watson, and Peggy Wilson. Kimberly Williamson Butler was invited, but could not attend due to her jail sentence. The candidates discussed levees and hurricane evacuation plans, housing and redevelopment of neighborhoods, the role of the state and federal government in the rebuilding of the city, and the issue of race in a city with drastically altered demographics. The two main challengers, Forman and Landrieu, were perceived as largely playing safe, while other candidates, particularly Couhig and Wilson, were more combative. Ray Nagin focused on defending his record and emphasizing the need for experienced leadership in a time of crisis.

State campaign finance reports were released on March 25 showing candidates' finances as of March 13. The major candidates had amassed campaign funds several times greater than those raised in recent elections, making this mayoral election the city's most expensive in history. Incumbent mayor Nagin had the most well-financed campaign, with $1,182,776 available; Ron Forman followed closely with a $1,002,692 war chest. Mitch Landrieu had the third largest campaign fund, at $547,003. Rob Couhig had raised a significant amount - $131,535 - but had already spent it.

The second mayoral debate was held on March 27. Only the perceived front-runners - Nagin, Forman, Landrieu, Watson, Wilson, Boulet, and Couhig - were invited. Discussion was focused on housing restoration, fiscal management, flood protection, and crime. The second debate was more combative than the first, with the three leading candidates facing strong criticism from the others.

A new poll released on April 7 reinforced the common perception that the election is shaping up to be a three-way race. Landrieu and Nagin appeared to be in a dead heat, with the lieutenant governor leading with 27% over the incumbent mayor's 26%. Forman remained in third place with 16%, but he appeared to be rapidly closing the gap between himself and the front-runners when compared with previous polls. Like previous polls, these latest numbers only included current residents of New Orleans; without taking displaced voters into account, their accuracy remained questionable.

In the final days of the primary campaign, a wave of negative campaign ads emerged. The clash began on April 7 with Forman accusing Landrieu of supporting tax increases; Landrieu countered with criticisms of Forman's handling of public money and of his high salary at the Audubon Institute. Forman continued his attacks by accusing Landrieu of being soft on crime. These attacks have been interpreted as efforts by Landrieu and Forman to position themselves to win a slot in the runoff against Nagin. Meanwhile, Wilson accused both Landrieu and Forman of being 'liberal Democrats' and of being complicit in the corruption of former mayor Marc Morial. Couhig, Watson, and Forman battled over the support of conservative and Republican voters; Forman urged voters not to waste their votes on minor candidates, while Couhig stepped up his attacks on Forman, painting him as a liberal no different from Landrieu or Nagin.

As of April 14, the Forman campaign had raised the most money, with over $2.1 million in his campaign chest. Landrieu had raised just under $2 million, while Nagin had raised $1.46 million. Couhig had raised $395,000, Boulet had amassed $268,000, Wilson had $101,000 and Watson $85,000.

On April 17, the major candidates—Boulet, Couhig, Forman, Landrieu, Nagin, Watson, and Wilson—appeared on a nationally televised debate co-hosted by Chris Matthews and New Orleans newsanchor Norman Robinson. The debate was televised nationally over MSNBC, an exceedingly rare occurrence for a local mayoral campaign; this was done because of many New Orleans voters still living elsewhere in the aftermath of Katrina and due to national interest.

On 22 April preliminary results showed Nagin with 38% of the vote, with 41,489 votes, and Landrieu with 29% and 31,499. On May 20, a runoff election between Nagin and Landrieu took place. Forman with 17% and 18,734 votes conceded defeat; Couhig came in fourth with 10% and 10,287 votes.

=== Runoff ===
In the runoff campaign, few substantive policy differences emerged between Landrieu and Nagin. Instead, the main issues in the runoff campaign were differences in personality and governing styles.

Alongside stressing his accomplishments in bringing jobs to New Orleans before the storm, Nagin's campaign emphasized the decisive role the mayor played in the aftermath of Katrina and the importance of the relationships he has built with state and federal leaders. The incumbent also stressed the risk of "experimenting" with a new mayor at the start of another hurricane season. Nagin criticized Landrieu's "old-style politics" and implied that he had ties to past politicians like Marc Morial.

Landrieu emphasized his record in the state legislature and as Lieutenant Governor, and his ability to build consensus among a broad range of political players. For their part, the Landrieu campaign criticized Nagin's go-it-alone governing style as alienating to New Orleans's potential allies, and his frequent gaffes as embarrassing to the city. Landrieu said he would restore credibility to city government and jump-start a lethargic rebuilding process: a major Landrieu slogan was "What was OK before Katrina isn't OK after Katrina." Landrieu ads featured shots of the city's abandoned flooded cars and blamed Nagin for his lack of leadership.

In the runoff, Landrieu received endorsements from third-place primary finisher Ron Forman, as well as the city's police and fire organizations and District Attorney Eddie Jordan. Nagin was endorsed by Rob Couhig, who appeared in Nagin ads praising the mayor's pro-business credentials. Other Nagin endorsements included defeated candidates Virginia Boulet and Tom Watson (who vehemently criticized Nagin in the primary), as well as congressman Bill Jefferson and state senator Cleo Fields.

The runoff campaign was also affected by the May 9 release of the first major book about Katrina: historian Douglas Brinkley's The Great Deluge. The book offers a scathing portrayal of Nagin's performance in the week after Katrina, describing him as a man on the verge of breakdown, hiding in the Hyatt hotel and refusing to emerge to take decisive action. Nagin described the book as a "political satire" that twisted the facts, and criticized the timing of its release as politically motivated.

== Opinion polls ==
As polls were largely based on New Orleanians still reachable by their pre-Katrina telephone numbers, pollsters admitted they were subject to an unusually large margin of error, and declined to speculate exactly how large that margin of error was.

=== Primary ===
Poll conducted by	Date conducted	Date released	Link	Nagin	Landrieu	Forman	Couhig	Wilson	Watson	Undecided
Ed Renwick	January 26-February 13	February 24		25%	35%	9%	X	7%	X	25%
CNN/USA Today/Gallup	February 18–26	March 2		19%	18%	12%	X	7%	4%	40%
Ed Renwick	March 23–28	April 7		26%	27%	16%	6%	3%	1%	22%

X = This candidate was not included in this poll

=== Runoff ===
Poll conducted by	Date conducted	Date released	Link	Nagin	Landrieu	Undecided
Tulane University Department of Political Science	May 13–15, 2006	May 16, 2006		38%	48%	14%

== Results ==
=== Mayoral primary, April 22 ===
Mayoral primary results
Party	Candidate	Votes	%
Democratic	Ray Nagin (incumbent)	41,561	38.36
Democratic	Mitch Landrieu	31,551	29.12
Democratic	Ron Forman	18,764	17.32
Republican	Rob Couhig	10,312	9.52
Democratic	Virginia Boulet	2,376	2.19
Democratic	Tom Watson	1,264	1.17
Democratic	Kimberly Williamson Butler	797	0.74
Republican	Peggy Wilson	773	0.71
Democratic	Johnny Adriani	115	0.11
None	Manny Chevrolet Bruno	100	0.09
None	Greta Gladney	99	0.09
Democratic	James Arey	99	0.09
Other	Marie Galatas	74	0.07
Democratic	Leo Watermeier	65	0.06
Democratic	Shedrick C. White	64	0.06
Democratic	Sonja "Lady" DeDais	62	0.06
Democratic	Jimmy Lemann	60	0.06
Other	F. Nick Bacque	52	0.05
Democratic	Elvin Brown	51	0.05
Democratic	Mac Rahman	50	0.05
Democratic	Norbert Rome	42	0.04
Democratic	Roderick Dean	16	0.01
Total votes		108,348	

As the top two vote-getters, Nagin and Landrieu entered the runoff election held on May 20. All 442 precincts were reported in the official results.

Nagin won 289 of the city's 442 precincts; overwhelmingly in sections of the city which have a black majority. This is a marked difference from Nagin's 2002 showings, when the bulk of his support came from white precincts. In 2006, Nagin received only 6% of the white vote.

Landrieu won 87 precincts, primarily in Uptown, Mid-City, the French Quarter, the Faubourg Marigny, and Bywater neighborhoods. He attracted 24% of black votes and 30% of white votes.

The two front runners did better at attracting voters from outside of their own race than any of the other candidates.

Forman won 57 precincts, almost exclusively in the wealthiest and whitest sections of the city: the university section of Uptown, Lakeview, the Garden District, and the lower coast of Algiers. He received more support from white voters than any other candidate, but got only 4% support from black voters.

Couhig won only 6 precincts, in the Lakeview, Lake Vista, and lower coast of Algiers. Many observers speculated that Couhig served to split the conservative vote and prevented Forman from making the runoff, while others pointed out that even if Couhig's and Forman's votes were combined the total is still almost 2500 short of the amount which would have been required to beat Landrieu.

The very poor showing of Peggy Wilson surprised some of her supporters. She finished behind candidates with much less local name recognition who spent far less on their campaigns. Formerly a well-known and powerful figure on the city council, some saw Wilson's failure to get significant voter support as the end of her career in local politics.

=== Mayoral Runoff, May 20 ===
Runoff results
Party	Candidate	Votes	%
Democratic	Ray Nagin (incumbent)	59,460	52.35
Democratic	Mitch Landrieu	54,131	47.65
Total votes		113,591	

With unofficial results showing 53% of the vote for Nagin, Landrieu conceded defeat shortly before 10:30 pm on election night. Nagin gave an acceptance speech shortly thereafter, at about 10:35 pm. Nagin won by the slimmest margin for an incumbent facing re-election since the mayoral election of 1965, in which mayor Victor Schiro's handling of Hurricane Betsy also affected his poor showing. Nagin also won with a dramatic shift in the racial breakdown of his voter base; in this election he received the support of about 80% of black voters and 20% of white voters, a reversal of his support base in the 2002 election.

== Post election analysis ==
Some outside observers were shocked that Nagin defeated Landrieu, assuming that the embattled and controversial incumbent would not be able to muster the votes required to keep his position. Due to the high percentage of black voter support for Nagin, there were some accusations of racialized 'bloc voting.' Others noted that Landrieu's support was also lopsided in favor of white voters, although he received a significant minority of African American voters. The racial breakdown of votes was roughly equal for the two candidates; each won roughly 80% of the votes of the members of their own race, and 20% of the votes from the other race.

Nagin's chief campaign strategist Jim Carvin attributed Nagin's victory to a number of factors, including competition between Forman and Landrieu for the anti-Nagin vote in the primary, the lack of a well-funded and well-known black challenger, and Landrieu's unwillingness to make strong attacks on Nagin. Taking these factors into account, Carvin and the Nagin campaign took a strategy of building a biracial coalition consisting of the large majority of black voters plus enough white conservatives to bring the mayor over 50%. A main Nagin campaign theme, centered around the slogan "Re-elect our mayor: Re-unite our city," was supplemented with targeted ads touting Nagin's pro-business and conservative credentials and criticizing Mitch Landrieu as a career politician and member of a powerful political family. His criticism of Landrieu as a representative of "old politics" was able to appeal to both white voters wary of a potential return to patronage politics and to black voters unwilling to return to the days of white political domination of a majority-black city.

Some analysts attributed Nagin's victory to a black turnout which was much larger than expected, mobilized by worries about the threat of a white political takeover and anger over what they perceived as an effort to disenfranchise dispersed voters who were unable to return to the city to vote. One political commentator made links between the mobilization of support for Nagin and the Civil Rights Movement, and noted the contrast between the 2006 election and previous perceptions of Nagin as the "white candidate."

The strong white conservative and Republican Party turnout for Nagin, however, may have been the factor that tipped the balance. Defeated primary candidate Rob Couhig led the Republican rally behind Nagin. The Nagin campaign sent out flyers to heavily white Republican neighborhoods quoting some local black leaders calling him "Ray Reagan", a reference to Ronald Reagan intended to be insulting, but which was seen more sympathetically among Republicans.

Other factors cited by some were the fond memory of Nagin's famous "get off your asses" radio interview during the worst days after Katrina, and what some saw as Landrieu's cautiously dispassionate campaigning style which some found uninspiring. In particular, Landrieu was criticized for not focusing on Nagin's shortcomings in the post-Katrina recovery, and in not sufficiently differentiating his policy proposals from Nagin's.

In New Orleans politics, incumbency is a large advantage; an incumbent mayor has not been defeated in an election since deLesseps Morrison beat sitting mayor Robert Maestri in the election of 1946. In contrast to the mayoral election, the simultaneous City Council election results were strongly anti-incumbent, with three established well-known Council members losing to newcomers promising reform.

Preceded by 2002 mayoral election	New Orleans mayoral elections	Succeeded by 2010 mayoral election

== See also ==
- 2006 New Orleans city council election
