= 2014 New Orleans mayoral election =

- February 1, 2014
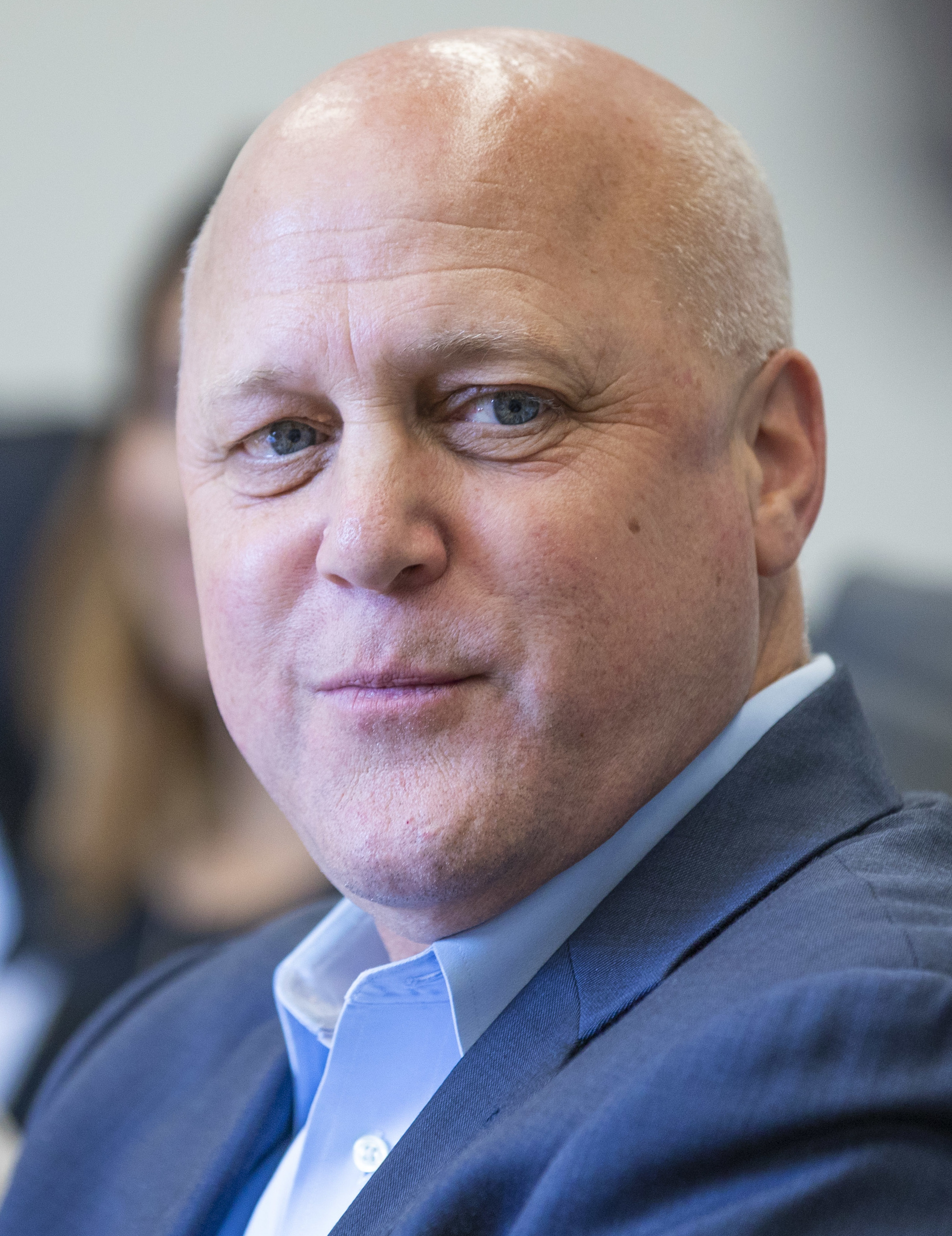

Candidate	Mitch Landrieu	Michael Bagneris
Party	Democratic	Democratic
Popular vote	53,441	27,991
Percentage	63.57%	33.29%
Results by precinct:
Landrieu:
40–50%
50–60%
60–70%
70–80%
80–90%
>90%
Bagneris:
40–50%
50–60%
60–70%
Tie:
(between Landrieu and Bagneris)
Mayor before election
Mitch Landrieu
Democratic
Elected mayor
Mitch Landrieu
Democratic

The 2014 New Orleans mayoral election was held on February 1, 2014, to elect the Mayor of New Orleans, Louisiana. Incumbent Democratic Mayor Mitch Landrieu was re-elected to a second term.

== Candidates ==
=== Democratic ===
==== Declared ====
- Michael Bagneris, former Civil District Court judge (resigned to run)
- Danatus N. King Sr., attorney and President of the NAACP New Orleans Branch
- Mitch Landrieu, incumbent Mayor

=== Independent ===
==== Withdrew ====
- Manny "Chevrolet" Bruno, textbook salesman and candidate for Mayor in 2002, 2006 and 2010

== Results ==
Mayor of New Orleans election results
Party	Candidate	Votes	%
Democratic	Mitch Landrieu (incumbent)	53,441	63.57
Democratic	Michael Bagneris	27,991	33.29
Democratic	Danatus N. King Sr.	2,638	3.14
Total votes		84,070	100
