= Ron Forman =

American politician

- Born: Leon Ronald Forman c. 1947
- Education: Louisiana State University
- Political party: Democratic

Ron Forman is the president and CEO of the Audubon Foundation and was formerly the head of the Audubon Nature Institute. He was one of the leading candidates in the 2006 New Orleans mayoral election. A past president of the American Zoo and Aquarium Association, Ron Forman began his tenure with Audubon Park and Zoological Garden in 1972 as City Hall liaison. Made Deputy Director in 1973 and Executive Director in 1977, the major transformation of Audubon Zoo from an "urban ghetto" to an "urban Eden" was underway. Ron Forman stepped down as CEO in 2024, and is followed by current CEO Micheal Sawaya.

During the 80's, the Audubon Nature Institute, Inc. evolved from the Friends of the Zoo organization and assumed operation of Audubon Park and Zoo. Plans were made, with overwhelming voter support, for a downtown park and aquarium. Woldenberg Riverfront Park opened in 1989 and was followed in 1990 by the Audubon Aquarium of the Americas.

The Freeport-McMoRan Audubon Species Survival Center on the West Bank of the Mississippi River opened late in 1993. An important component of it, the Audubon Center for Research of Endangered Species, opened in 1996.

The Audubon Louisiana Nature Center, located in Eastern New Orleans, merged into the family of Audubon facilities in 1994. The Nature Center, devastated by Hurricane Katrina, operates the programs at the Audubon Wilderness Park located adjacent to the Species Survival Center.

The Entergy IMAX Theatre, adjacent to the Audubon Aquarium of the Americas, opened in October 1995, while phase II of the Aquarium, a changing exhibits gallery, opened in the spring of 1996. The Audubon Insectarium, located in the U.S. Custom House, opened in 2008.

Forman serves locally on the New Orleans Business Council, is Chairman of the Louisiana Stadium and Exposition District, Chairman of the New Orleans Jazz Orchestra Board and the Immediate Past Chairman of the New Orleans Metropolitan Convention & Visitors Bureau. A past member of the Board of Directors of the American Association of Museums, he is also on the Advisory Committee of Chimp Haven.

Forman is a New Orleans native and a graduate of Louisiana State University. Married to the former Sally Gelpi, he is the father of Daniel, McClain, and Cassidy Forman and also the grandfather of Jack, Benjamin, and Charlie Forman.

Forman worked in the administration of mayor Moon Landrieu in the early 1970s. Forman was named deputy director of the city's Audubon Zoo, a decrepit institution the city was making a major commitment to upgrade. Forman worked as a champion of the Zoo's improvements. Forman became president and CEO of the Audubon Nature Institute 1977, a role he has continued until going on unpaid leave to run for mayor in 2006. During his tenure the facilities of the Institute have undergone major expansions. The Institute runs not only the Audubon Zoo, but also Audubon Park, the Aquarium of the Americas, and the newest Audubon Insectarium housed in the U.S. Custom House Federal Building on Canal St.

Forman supported mayor Marc Morial's unsuccessful attempt to change the city charter to allow Morial a third term. After this Forman backed Ray Nagin in Nagin's successful 2002 electoral campaign for Mayor of New Orleans, but Forman broke with Nagin after Hurricane Katrina.

In his 2006 campaign for mayor, Forman proposed the creation of four deputy mayor posts, two white and two black, in an effort to promote better race relations. He has a high profile in the city’s business community and had strong support among New Orleans’s wealthy and business communities. He was widely perceived as the favored candidate of much of the city's old money white elite, although Forman himself is the son of working class Jewish parents. If elected, he would have been New Orleans' first Jewish Mayor since Martin Behrman, who left office in 1926.

Preliminary results on the night of 22 April showed Forman with 17% of the vote; placing third. He conceded defeat, saying he would work to help whoever the eventual winner is. Forman endorsed Mitch Landrieu in the runoff, who was defeated by Nagin 52% to 48% on May 20.
