= 2010 New Orleans mayoral election =

- February 6, 2010
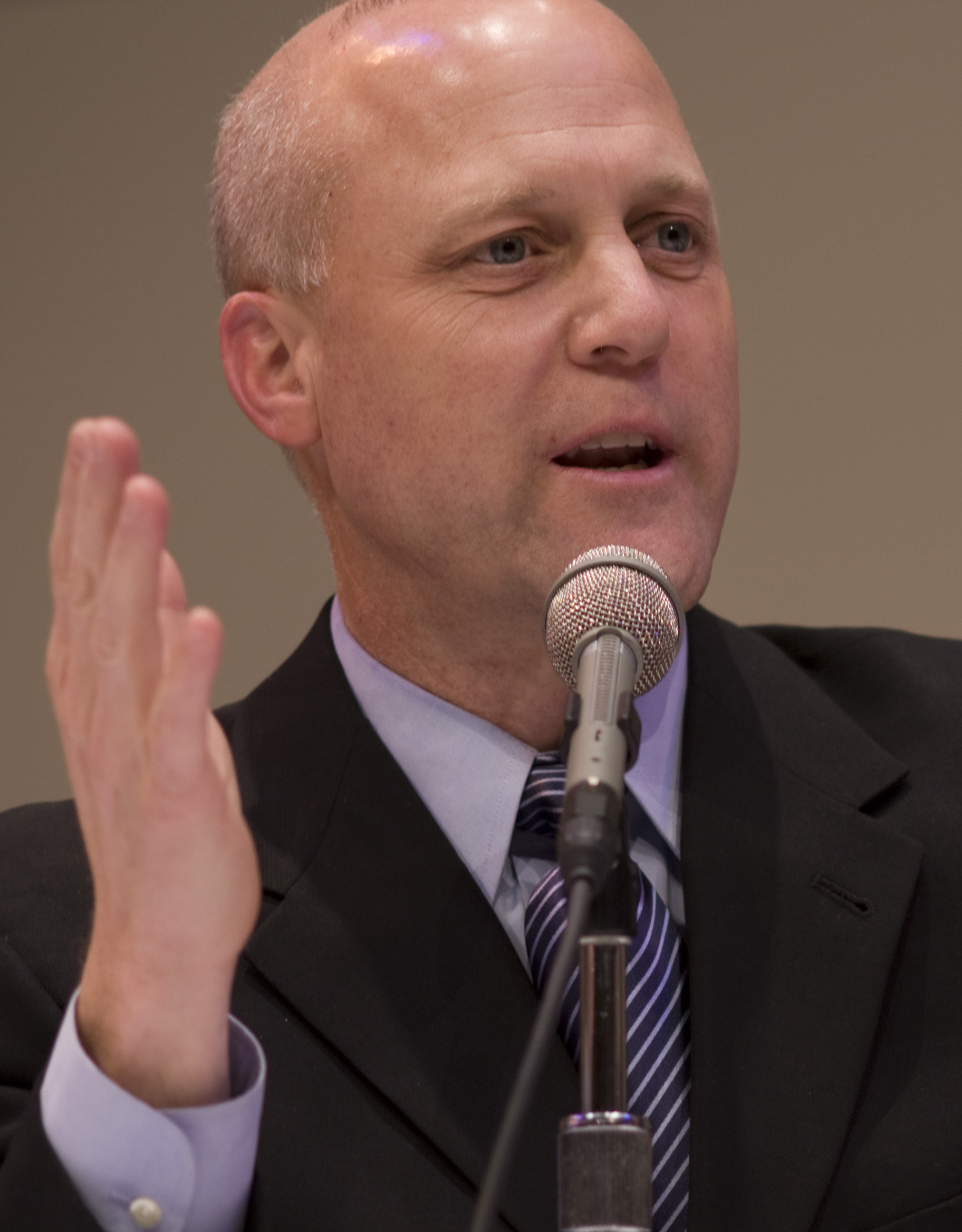

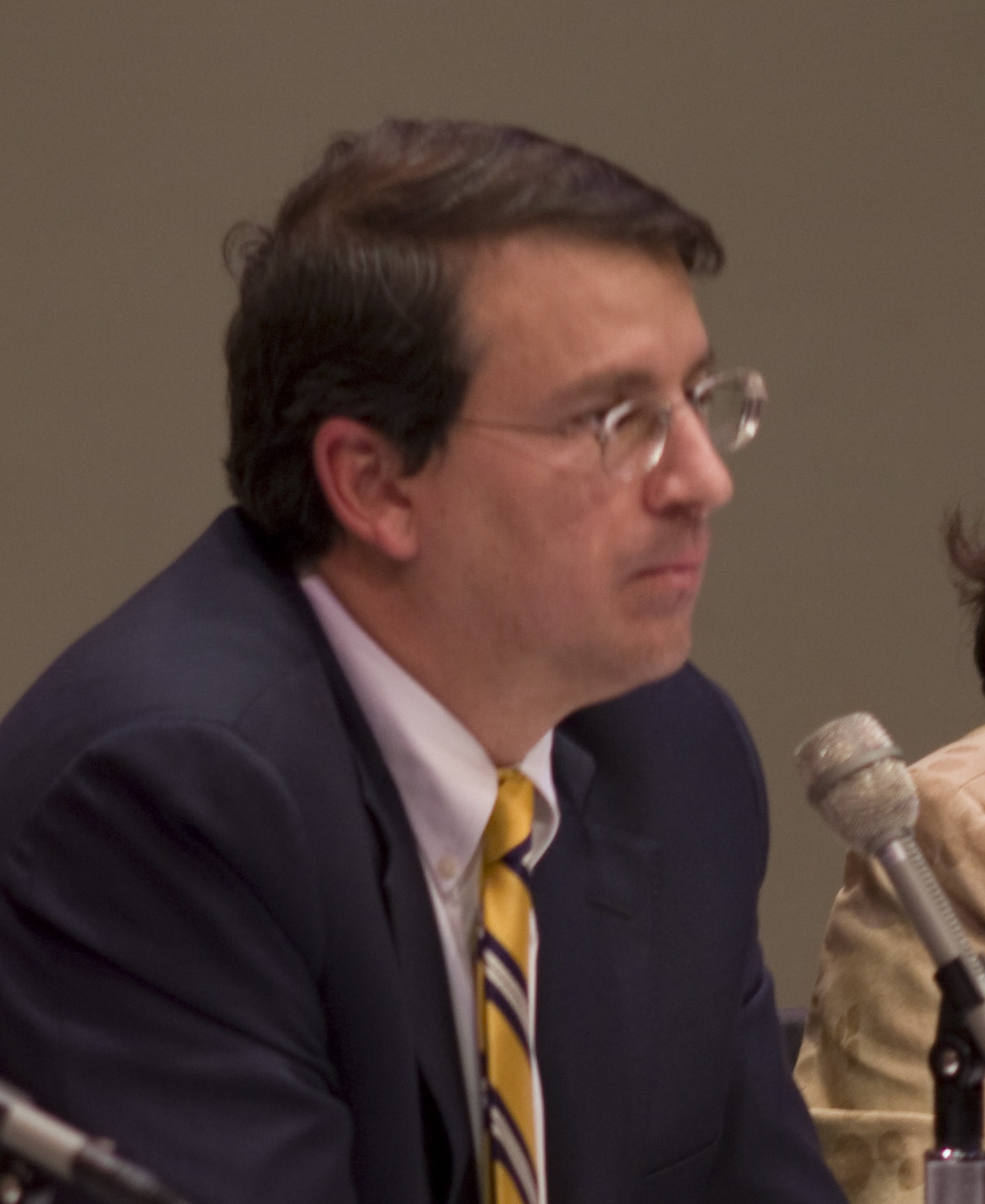

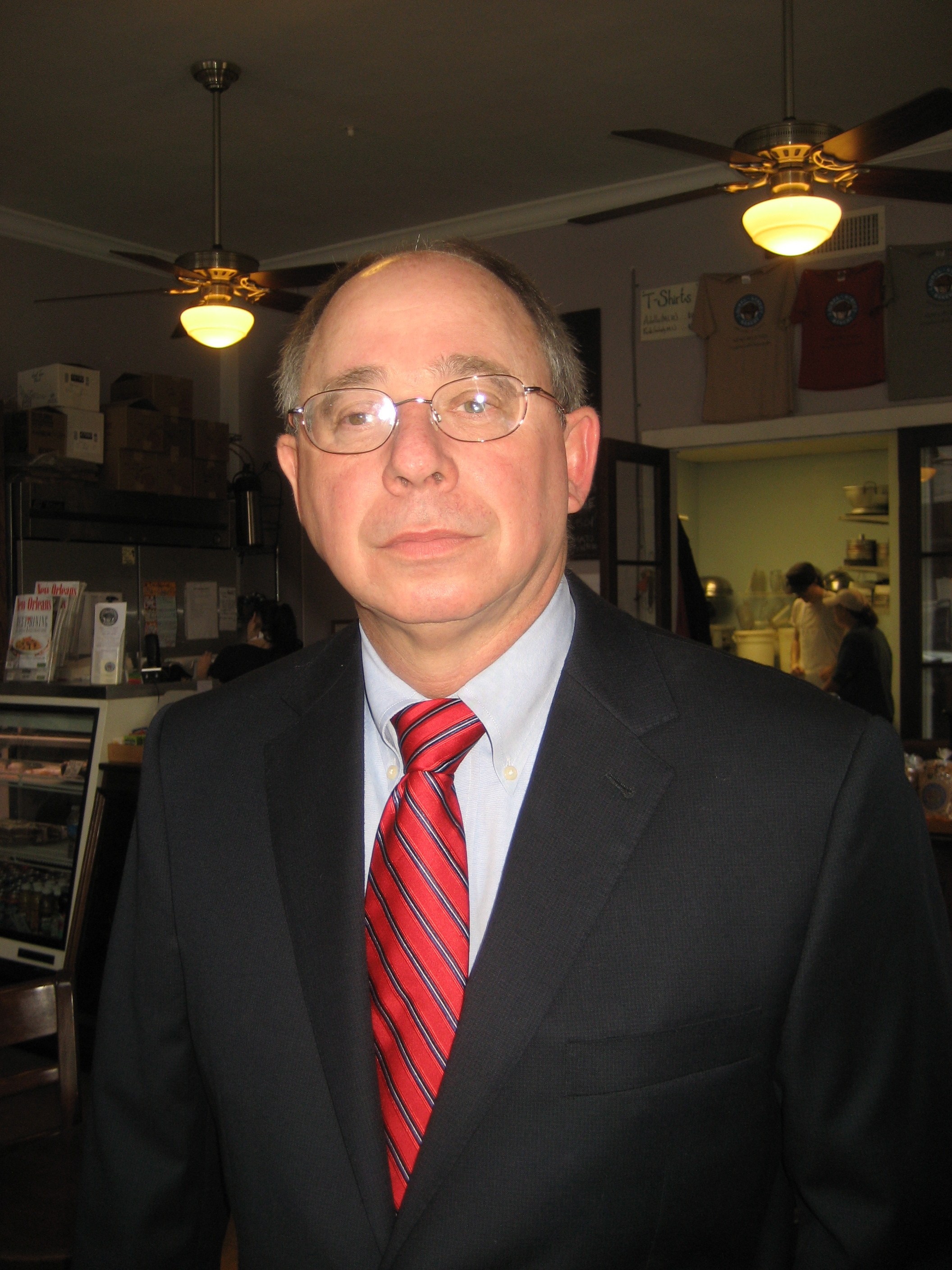
Candidate	Mitch Landrieu	Troy Henry
Party	Democratic	Democratic
Popular vote	58,279	12,278
Percentage	65.52%	13.8%
Candidate	John Georges	Rob Couhig
Party	Democratic	Republican
Popular vote	8,190	4,874
Percentage	9.21%	5.48%
Results by precinct:
Landrieu:
40–50%
50–60%
60–70%
70–80%
80–90%
Georges:
30–40%
Mayor before election
Ray Nagin
Democratic
Elected mayor
Mitch Landrieu
Democratic

The 2010 New Orleans mayoral election was held on February 6, 2010, to elect the Mayor of New Orleans, Louisiana. Incumbent Democratic Mayor Ray Nagin was term-limited and ineligible to run for re-election to a third term.

Democrat Mitch Landrieu, the Lieutenant Governor of Louisiana, was elected mayor in a landslide and was sworn in on May 3, 2010.

== Candidates ==
Several candidates in multiple parties registered to run for the office of Mayor of New Orleans.

=== Democratic ===
- John Georges, businessman and independent candidate for governor in 2007
- Troy Henry, businessman
- Mitch Landrieu, Lieutenant Governor of Louisiana and candidate for mayor in 1994
- James Perry, fair housing advocate
- Nadine Ramsey, retired judge (resigned to run for mayor)

=== Republican ===
- Rob Couhig, lawyer, businessman, entrepreneur and candidate for mayor in 2006
- Thomas A. Lambert, quality control specialist

=== Independent ===
- Jonah Bascle, comedian and disability activist
- Manny "Chevrolet" Bruno, textbook salesman and candidate for mayor in 2002 and 2006
- Jerry Jacobs, retired immigration agent, cannabis decriminalization activist and independent candidate for Louisiana's 2nd congressional district in 2008
- Norbert P. Rome, community activist and candidate for mayor in 2006

=== Not qualifying ===
- Brad Pitt, actor. Despite a tongue-in-cheek "Brad Pitt for Mayor" campaign by some locals, Pitt was not actually running. He does not qualify under the city charter, which specifies candidates must have been New Orleans residents for at least 5 years.

== Results ==
The 2010 New Orleans mayoral election occurred on the day before Super Bowl XLIV, the first (and only) Super Bowl for which the New Orleans Saints have ever competed. The year's highly successful football season brought about an unprecedented amount of local support for the team and resulted in relatively low voter turnouts due to preoccupation with citywide celebrations.

Mayor of New Orleans election results
Party	Candidate	Votes	%
Democratic	Mitch Landrieu	58,279	65.52
Democratic	Troy Henry	12,278	13.8
Democratic	John Georges	8,190	9.21
Republican	Robert Couhig	4,874	5.48
Democratic	James Perry	2,702	3.04
Democratic	Nadine Ramsey	1,894	2.13
Republican	Thomas A. Lambert	239	0.27
Independent	Jonah Bascle	160	0.18
Independent	Manny "Chevrolet" Bruno	139	0.16
Independent	Jerry Jacobs	106	0.12
Independent	Norbert P. Rome	84	0.09
Total votes		88,945	100
