= National Wetlands Coalition =

The National Wetlands Coalition, founded in 1989, has opposed U.S. wetlands policy, saying "the federal government, while seeking to protect wetlands, casts a wide net and imposes burdensome and ineffective regulations on private property that does not function as or provide the ecosystem benefits of high-value wetlands". Time Magazine called it "a big-biz coalition against wetlands".

In 1995, the organization consisted of about 60 municipal associations, utilities and major industrial companies, such as Exxon, Texaco and Kerr-McGee.

The National Wetlands Coalition has been characterized as the quintessential astroturf organization, which is an organization that presents itself as a grassroots organization, but was actually founded by (and is largely funded by) a separate commercial or political organization in order to promote its own agenda, while keeping its relationship to the new organization hidden. A study by the University of Oklahoma used the National Wetlands Coalition as a specific example to examine the influence of corporate front-group stealth campaigns, in which corporations form associations that, in turn, adopt names that are designed to misrepresent their true intentions. The results of the study indicated that front-group stealth campaigns were effective in enhancing public perceptions of the front group itself. The National Wetlands Coalition campaigns successfully undermined perceptions of the targeted attitude object, eroding support for any federal efforts to restrict wetlands’ development or regulate developers.

The organization has been relatively inactive since around the late 1990s. The website was being "reworked" from February 2001 through November 2005; it went offline in December 2005.

== See also ==
- Audubon Nature Institute (based in New Orleans in the US)

== Bibliography ==
- Hebert, James, The San Diego Union-Tribune, July 1, 2003, p. E-1, "False Fronts: Consider the source -- if you can identify it"
