= Displacement after Hurricane Katrina =

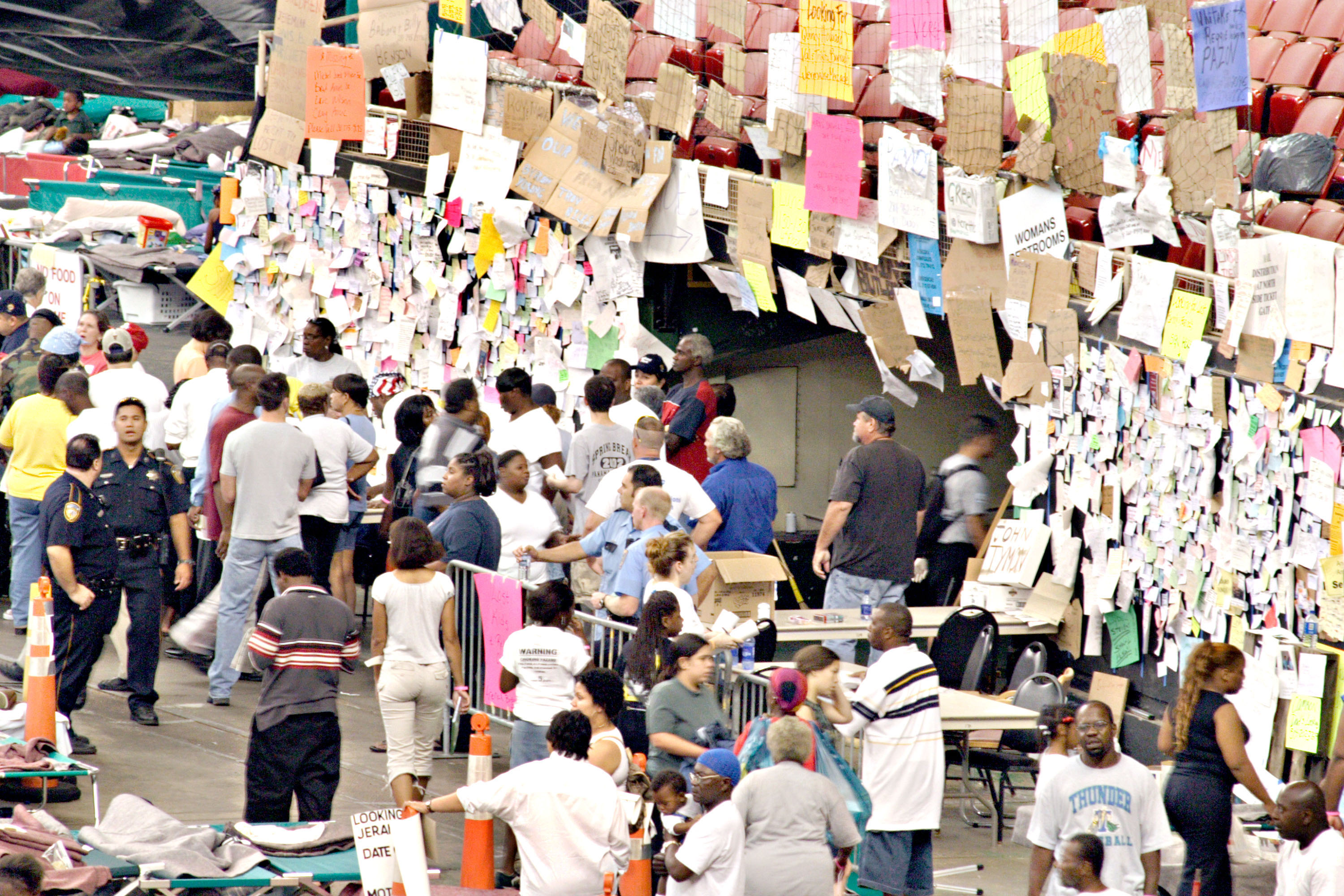
Houston, TX, September 3, 2005. A giant message board helps people locate friends and loved ones at the Reliant Center. Thousands of displaced citizens were moved from New Orleans to Houston in a FEMA organized bus program.

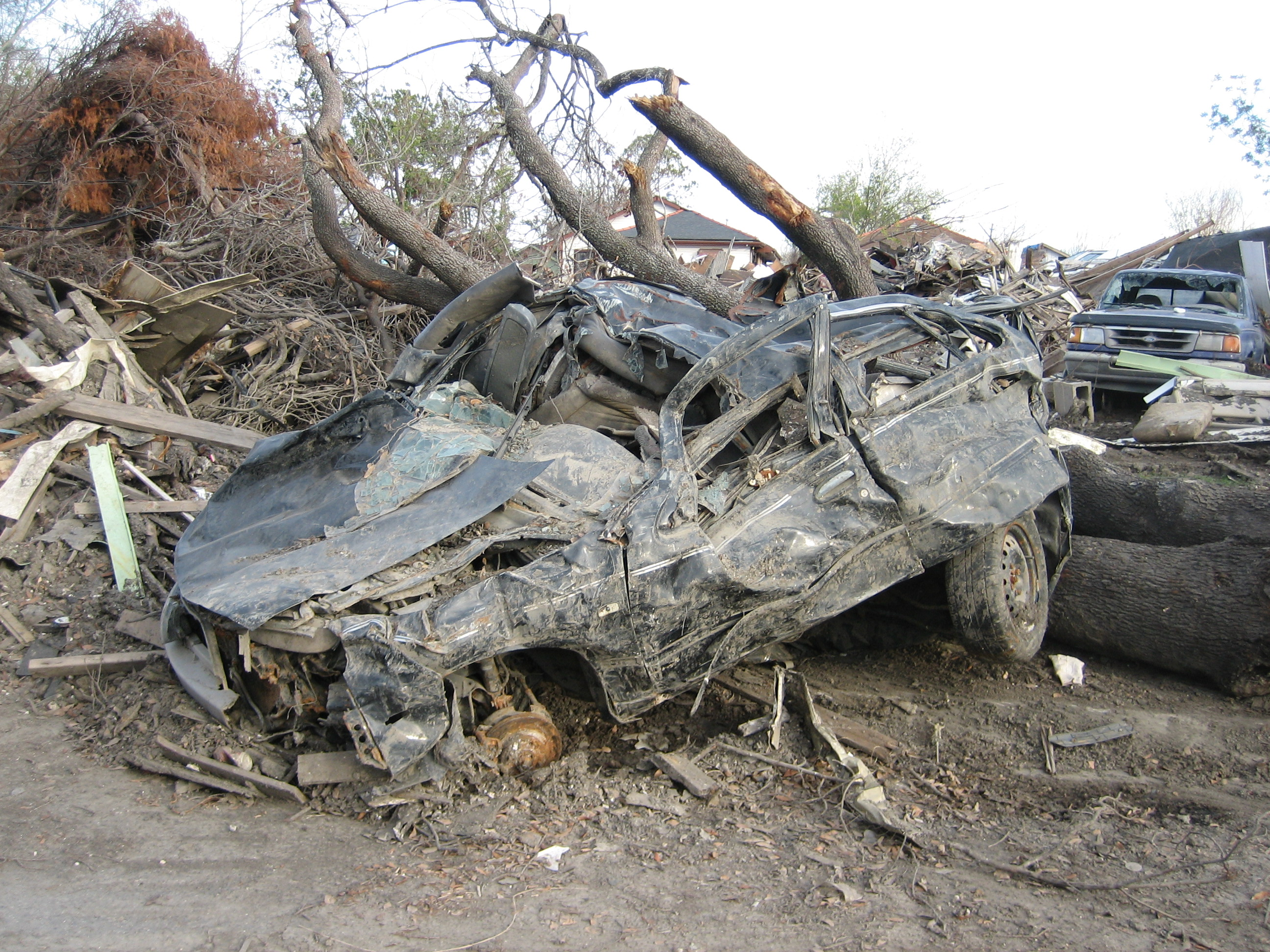
Photo of destruction in Lower Ninth Ward following Hurricane Katrina

People from the Gulf States region in the southern United States, most notably New Orleans, Louisiana, were forced to leave their homes because of the devastation brought on by Hurricane Katrina in 2005 and were unable to return because of a multitude of factors, and are collectively known as the Gulf Coast diaspora and by standard definition considered internally displaced persons. At their peak, hurricane evacuee shelters housed 273,000 people and, later, FEMA trailers housed at least 114,000 households. Even a decade after Hurricane Katrina, many victims who were forced to relocate were still unable to return home.

In 2005, around 1,500,000 people from Alabama, Mississippi and Louisiana were forced to leave their homes due to Hurricane Katrina. Around 40% of evacuees, mostly people from Louisiana, were not able to return home. 25% of evacuees relocated within 10 miles (16 km) of their previous county. 25% of evacuees relocated at least 450 miles (720 km) away. 10% of evacuees relocated at least 830 miles (1,340 km) away.

The population of New Orleans fell from 484,674 before Katrina (April 2000) to an estimated 230,172 after Katrina (July 2006)—a decrease of 254,502 and a loss of over half of the city's population. As of 2020, New Orleans had an estimated population of 383,997, still below the population of the city prior to Hurricane Katrina. However, not all those who moved to the city were returning residents. After Hurricane Katrina, the privatization push gained momentum. With the opportunity to enact proposals that had circulated since the mid-1980s, the city council voted unanimously to demolish 4,500 units of traditional public housing. In just over a decade—from 1996 to 2007—the city managed to close 85% of the city's public housing, adopting a system of "mixed-income" projects and vouchers instead. While it was touted as "deconcentration," the removal project displaced low-income residents and 16,000 families remained on the waitlist for subsidized housing in 2015.

== Pre-Katrina decrease in population ==
Prior to Hurricane Katrina, New Orleans experienced a decrease in population of 18% (109,000 residents) between 1970 and 2000, which fell by a further 6% (30,000 residents) from 2000 to 2005.

== Diaspora destinations ==
In the initial period following Hurricane Katrina, there were several useful sources of data about where displaced residents from New Orleans were living. In particular, information on the location of refugees was available from change-of-address forms filed with the U.S. Postal Service and from registrations with the Federal Emergency Management Agency (FEMA) for aid. Analyses of these data showed that nearly 15% of evacuees from New Orleans relocated to distant cities in the East Coast, Midwest, and West Coast. The main destinations for displaced residents were suburban New Orleans, Houston, Dallas, Atlanta, and Baton Rouge.

=== Texas ===
Texas avoided any direct damage from Hurricane Katrina, but the state took in an estimated 220,000 people who sought refuge from Louisiana. On August 31, the Harris County, Texas Department of Homeland Security and Emergency Management and the state of Louisiana came to an agreement to allow at least 25,000 evacuees from New Orleans, especially those who were sheltered in the Louisiana Superdome, to move to the Astrodome until they could return home. The evacuation began on September 1. President George W. Bush announced on September 4 that additional evacuees would be airlifted to other states. When the Houston shelters began to reach capacity on September 2, Governor Rick Perry activated an emergency plan that made space for an additional 25,000 each in San Antonio and the Dallas-Fort Worth Metroplex, as well as smaller shelters in communities across Texas. Beginning with a convoy of 50 buses (2,700 people) that arrived at Reunion Arena in Dallas at 3:00 AM CST on September 3, a wave of over 120,000 additional evacuees began pouring into Texas at a rate such that, as of September 5, it was estimated there were roughly 139,000 evacuees in official shelters around the state. This, added to the estimated 90,000 that were already in hotels and homes, overwhelmed local resources. Dallas quickly sought help from nearby cities to help accommodate more evacuees. A staging area at the unused Big Town Mall in Mesquite was opened, but was also quickly overloaded. Fort Worth and Arlington accepted some evacuees, and towns from as far away as Bonham and even Tulsa, Oklahoma offered to help. By the afternoon of September 5, with a total estimated number of over 230,000 evacuees in Texas, Governor Perry ordered that buses begin being diverted to other shelters outside the state resulting in 20,000 being sent to Oklahoma and 30,000 being sent to Arkansas. By September 6, Texas had an estimated 250,000 evacuees and Governor Perry was forced to declare a state of emergency in Texas and issued an impassioned plea to other states to begin taking the 40,000-50,000 evacuees that were still in need of shelter.

The Reliant Astrodome in Houston took on some of the 25,000 who had initially sought shelter in the Louisiana Superdome in New Orleans, but quickly reached capacity and by September 2, was unable to accept additional hurricane evacuees from the disaster. The Astrodome was reopened a few hours later, after it was announced that all events scheduled through December 2005 would be cancelled so as to open the building to an additional 11,000 evacuees. City officials then opened two additional buildings adjacent to the Dome, the Arena, and the center, as well as the George R. Brown Convention Center in downtown Houston to house additional evacuees. The New Orleans Saints NFL football team, who were displaced from their home facility at the Superdome, moved temporarily to San Antonio. The Saints' 2005 home games were split between the Alamodome in San Antonio and Louisiana State University's Tiger Stadium in Baton Rouge. On December 30, 2005, the team and the league announced that the club would play a split schedule again in 2006.

Many communities in Texas opened up many of their services to evacuees from Louisiana, offering speedier enrollment for children in local school districts, speedy access to the Texas food stamp program, as well as access to health services for those being treated for diseases like tuberculosis and HIV. Texas state parks were opened free of charge to evacuees. More than 300 students from Tulane University, including the school's football team, were displaced to Southern Methodist University in Dallas.

== Demographics ==
As of 2008, just over half of the city's adult residents (56 percent) were African American, roughly one in three (35 percent) were white, and 5 percent were Hispanic. This is roughly equivalent to the shape of the population in a 2006 survey, fielded one year after Katrina. It is also fairly similar to the city's pre-storm distribution, as measured by the Census Bureau's 2005 American Community Survey (ACS), which found that the adult population was 60 percent African American and 32 percent Caucasian.

== Human rights ==
In the aftermath of the devastation caused by Hurricane Katrina, the issue of human rights was studied closely. The UN Human Rights Committee issued a 2006 report recommending that the United States endeavor to make certain the rights of poor and black Americans "are fully taken into consideration in the reconstruction plans with regard to access to housing, education and health care". The American Civil Liberties Union and the National Prison Project also documented mistreatment of the prison population during the flooding. In 2008, the Institute for Southern Studies, a nonpartisan research center, published a report on "Hurricane Katrina and the Guiding Principles on Internal Displacement". The study was one of five published by the ISS on the consequences of Hurricane Katrina and was a collaborative work produced along with the Brookings-Bern Project on Internal Displacement, co-directed by Walter Kälin, the Representative of the UN Secretary-General on the Human Rights of Internally Displaced Persons. The report found that the U.S. government neglected to adhere to "internationally recognized human rights principles the Bush administration has promoted in other countries." From May to June 2008, United Nations Special Rapporteur Doudou Diène was invited by the U.S. government to visit and study racial discrimination in the U.S. Diène's 2008 report was delivered to the United Nations Human Rights Council and was published in 2009.

== Housing ==
Housing, particularly for the poor, has been a contentious issue. In 2002, the United States Department of Housing and Urban Development (HUD) took over the Housing Authority of New Orleans (HANO) and planned shortly thereafter to redevelop half of the city's public housing complexes, which plan was instituted with urgency after Katrina struck the city. The plan has been met with controversy, with protests after the government decided to replace 4,500 units of housing with a mixed-use development that has 744 public housing units in C.J. Peete, B.W. Cooper, Lafitte and St. Bernard public housing projects.

In May 2009, FEMA announced an end to its temporary housing program that it started in the aftermath of Katrina, but presented with the more than 3,400 people still living in FEMA trailers in Louisiana and Mississippi who faced eviction, offered hurricane victims on the Gulf Coast still living in government-supplied trailers to buy their temporary homes for as little as $1.

In the meantime, rent has spiked an average of 40% since the storm in the city, with the small rental program instituted after the disaster having been ineffective in assisting small holding landlords to rebuild and improve properties previously inhabited by renters.

== Population recovery ==
Based on a 2009 study from the Brookings Institution in 2008, the city's population grew 3% from 2007 to 2008, compared with a 19% increase from 2006 to 2007, and overall, the city stood at about 72% of its pre-Katrina population of 450,000, or about 316,000, with the population of Jefferson Parish essentially returning to the pre-disaster level, and the adjoining St. Bernard Parish, reaching approximately 40% of its pre-disaster population.

Overall population continued to rebound by 2017, though more slowly, only increasing by 271 per year. Meanwhile, neighbourhood populations continued to grow and shrink, based on local factors. Data Center Research commented in 2018:

Thirteen years after Katrina, there are 21 neighborhoods in the city that now have a larger number of active addresses than they did prior to the levee breaches. Four neighborhoods have less than half the population they had prior to Katrina...

— https://www.datacenterresearch.org/reports_analysis/neighborhood-recovery-rates-growth-continues-through-2018-in-new-orleans-neighborhoods/

== See also ==
- Emergency evacuation
- Internally displaced person
- Kampala Convention
- Refugee
- Political asylee
