= Rob Couhig =

American lawyer and businessman

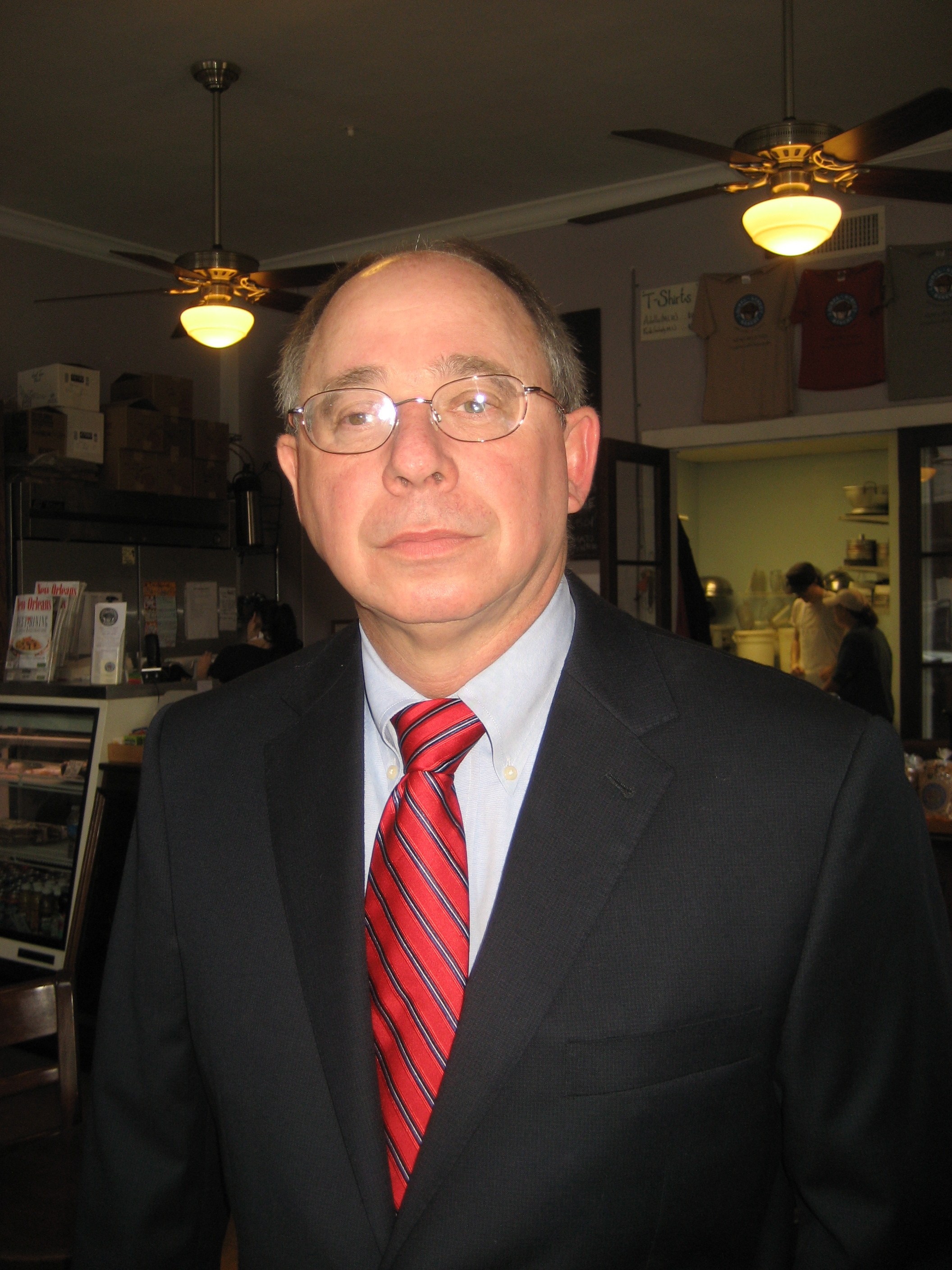
- Couhig in 2009
- Born: Robert Emmet Couhig Jr. April 20, 1949 (age 77); New Orleans, Louisiana
- Education: Georgetown University (BSc); Tulane University (JD)
- Occupations: Lawyer, businessman
- Organization(s): New Orleans Zephyrs (1993–2002); New Orleans Gamblers (1997–2000); Wycombe Wanderers (2019–2024); Reading (2025–present)
- Political party: Republican

Robert Emmet Couhig Jr. (born April 20, 1949) is an American attorney, businessman, and former political candidate. He is known for his ownership of sports teams, including the New Orleans Zephyrs (1993–2002), the New Orleans Gamblers (1997–2000), Wycombe Wanderers (2019–2024), and Reading (2025–present).

== Early life and education ==
Couhig was born at Baptist Hospital in New Orleans, Louisiana, on April 20, 1949, to Robert Emmet Couhig (1916/1917–2014) and Marcelle Reese (died 1986), the owners of Asphodel Plantation. He attended Jesuit High School and St Francisville High School before gaining his Bachelor of Science in International Economic Affairs from Georgetown University in 1971 on a scholarship. His Juris Doctor was obtained from Tulane University in 1975.

== Career ==
=== Legal and political ===
Couhig is a founding partner of a legal firm. He stood as a Republican candidate for Louisiana's 2nd congressional district in the 1980 United States House of Representatives elections, gaining 34.4% of the vote behind Lindy Boggs' 60.8%, and was unsuccessful in his 1999 Louisiana's 1st congressional district special election campaign.

Couhig unsuccessfully stood in the 2006 and 2010 New Orleans mayoral elections.

=== Sports ownership ===
Couhig was president of Minor League Baseball team the New Orleans Zephyrs from 1993 to 2002, and oversaw their 1995 relocation from Denver, Colorado, to New Orleans, Louisiana.

Couhig bought USISL team the New Orleans Gamblers in 1997, renaming them New Orleans Storm the following year. After estimated losses of $1 million, the club folded in 2000.

=== Wycombe Wanderers ===
After an unsuccessful attempt to buy Yeovil Town in early 2019, Couhig purchased a controlling 75% stake in League One club Wycombe Wanderers in October 2019. Under Couhig, Wycombe gained promotion to the Championship for their 2020–21 season, but were relegated to League One at the end of that season. Couhig sold the club to Mikheil Lomtadze in May 2024.

=== Reading FC ===
Couhig and business partner Todd Trosclair unsuccessfully attempted to buy League One club Reading from Dai Yongge in August 2024. Reading's fanbase had been protesting Dai's ownership following relegation, staff redundancies, sale of players, and multiple instances of point deductions for late payments of HMRC bills. During the negotiations, Couhig provided funding to the club. After the deal broke down, Couhig began litigation against Reading, stating that Dai breached exclusivity and defaulted on the loan and finance agreements. In March 2025, Couhig said that the takeover attempt was "exhausting" but that he would still like a deal to be agreed.

On May 3, the day of Reading's final game of their 2024–25 season, it was announced that Redwood Holdings Limited – a company of which Couhig and Trosclair are two directors – had agreed a sale in principle subject to "final legal technicalities". The deal includes Dai's shares in the club, as well as the club's Madejski Stadium and their training facility. The purchase was completed on May 14.

=== Other ventures ===
In the aftermath of Hurricane Katrina, Couhig presented a show on The New 99.5FM covering New Orleans' recovery and rebuilding.

== Personal life ==
Couhig married Susan Mullins, with whom he has two sons. He married Missy Aleman in 2003. His stepbrother is Sam A. LeBlanc III.
