= Jim Carvin =

American political consultant

James Carvin (July 25, 1929 – January 16, 2009) was a New Orleans political consultant with a sustained record of supporting winners in New Orleans mayoral elections. Using a wheelchair later in life, Carvin was eulogized as a "winner to the end" in the Times-Picayune by James Gill.
