= Audubon Nature Institute =

Nonprofit organization in Louisiana, United States

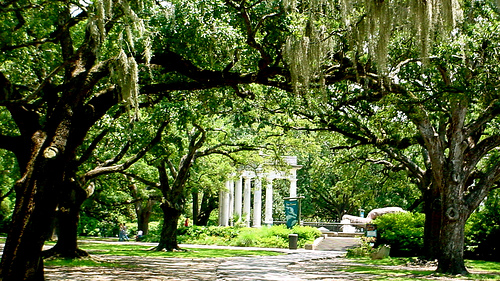
The Audubon Nature Institute manages many museums and parks around the New Orleans area.

The Audubon Nature Institute (American English: /ˈɑːdubən/) is a family of museums and parks dedicated to nature based in New Orleans, Louisiana, US.

The facilities include the Audubon Zoo, Audubon Aquarium, Audubon Louisiana Nature Center, Audubon Park, Woldenberg Riverfront Park, Freeport-McMoRan Audubon Species Survival Center, Audubon Center for Research of Endangered Species (ACRES), Audubon Wilderness Park, and Audubon Coastal Wildlife Network (CWN). Collectively, prior to COVID, there were 2 million annual visitors.

== History ==
=== 1800s (Decade) ===
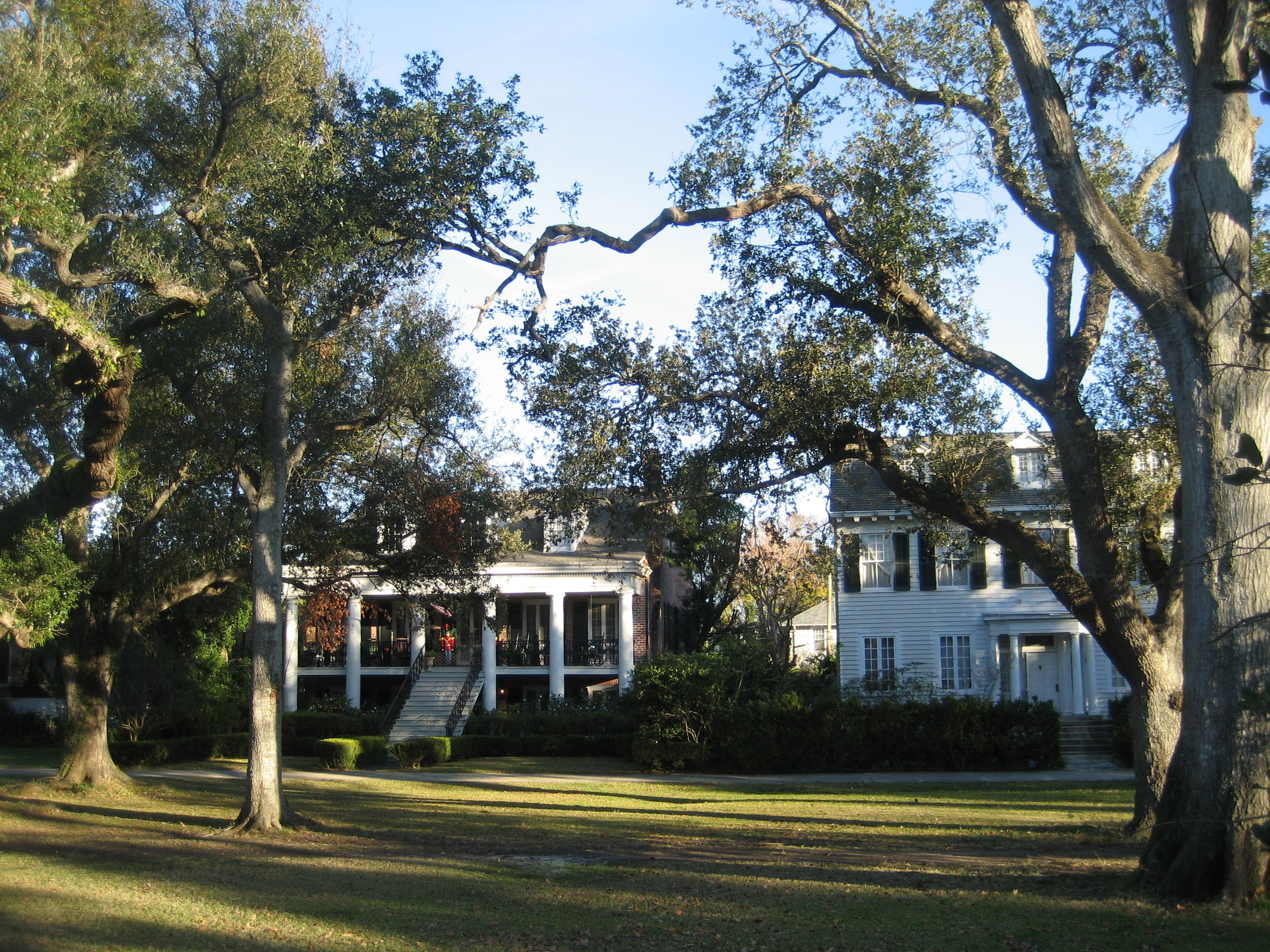
View of a part of Audubon Park with period-specific housing in the background.

The Audubon family of nature sites and facilities began with Audubon Park – once home to Native Americans – and later, to New Orleans' first mayor, Étienne de Boré. He founded the nation's first commercial sugar plantation here, when New Orleans was still part of Spanish colonial Louisiana; and developed its first granulated sugar through a process invented by Norbert Rillieux, a local free man of color.

The land did not fall into public hands until 1850, when a philanthropist willed the property to the city. During the US Civil War, the location alternately hosted a Confederate military camp and a Union hospital. In 1866, it was the activation site for the 9th Cavalry Regiment, the "Buffalo Soldiers," whose defense of the United States' western frontier made an indelible mark on America's African-American heritage.

Site improvements made for the World's Industrial and Cotton Centennial Exposition of 1884 (Louisiana's first World's Fair) laid the foundation for an urban park. The city had designated the land for this purpose in 1871; and in 1886, city planners changed the park's name from Upper City Park to Audubon Park. This was in tribute to artist/naturalist John James Audubon who painted many of his famed Birds of America in Louisiana.

A governing board was appointed by the city in 1894 to find the best way to develop the land; and by the turn of the century, development had been entrusted to landscape architect John Charles Olmsted. Olmsted's family firm had risen to prominence for its design of New York City's Central Park, and New Orleanians soon watched their own scenic retreat materialize from Louisiana swamp land.

=== 1900s (Decade): from decline to revitalization ===
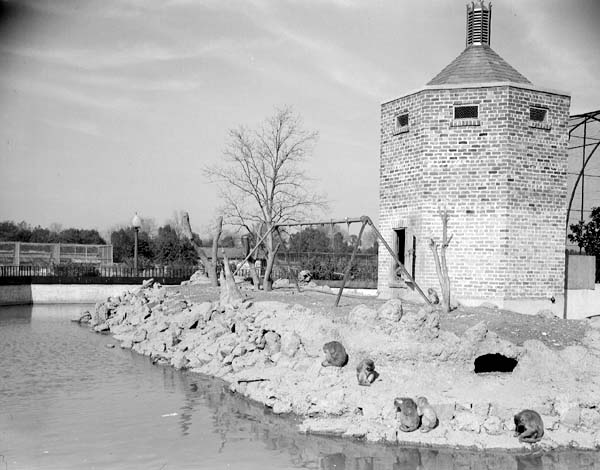
WPA erected "Monkey Island" with rhesus monkeys at the Audubon Zoo.

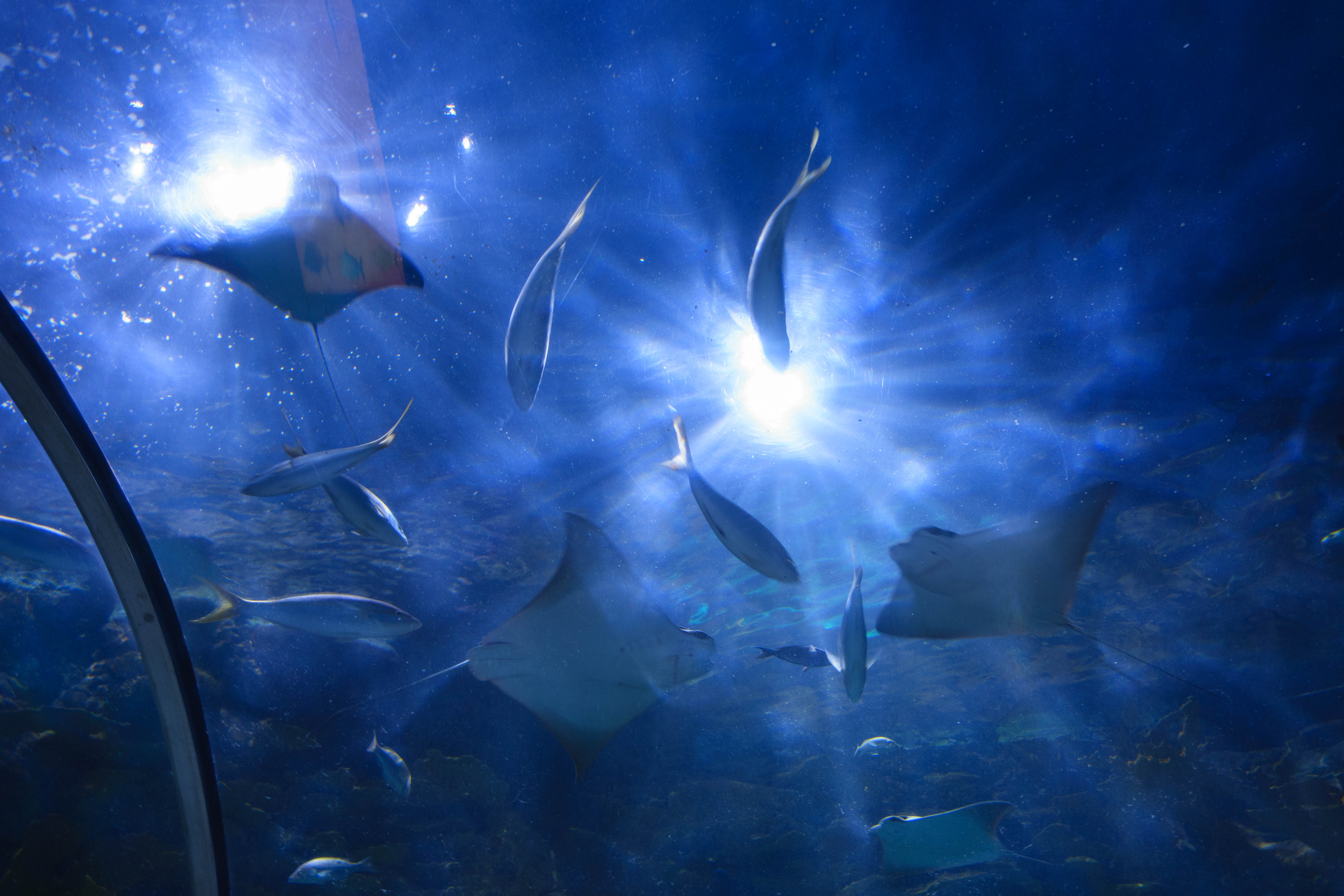
Inside a tunnel that passes through one of the aquariums at the Audubon Aquarium.

The Audubon Commission was established by State Act in 1914 to maintain and develop Audubon Park. A flight cage was added to the park in 1916, and its popularity launched the community's call for a full-scale zoo. Community leaders united as the New Orleans Zoological Society, and private donations soon funded a monkey cage, a mammal cage and a deer paddock. The first elephant, purchased by Louisiana schoolchildren, arrived in 1924. An aquarium and a colonnaded sea lion pool fueled the momentum, and by 1929, the collection boasted hundreds of animals.

When the Depression of the 1930s shut down private donations, the city's hope for a zoo was kept alive by the Works Progress Administration (WPA). This federal agency funded construction of new zoo buildings, and in 1938, a $50,000 bequest from local benefactor Valentine Merz enabled the opening of the Merz Memorial Zoo. Expensive to maintain and operate, the Merz facility held its own until the 1950s. Deterioration followed as city appropriations dwindled, private donations dried up and public interest waned. There were a few bright moments (including the 1956 arrival of the first endangered whooping crane hatched in a zoo), but times were mostly bad. Blasted by the media as an animal "ghetto" in 1958 and urged to "clean up or close up" by the Humane Society of the United States in 1970, the Zoo—now called Audubon Zoo—begged recovery.

In 1972 the Commission spearheaded passage of a special referendum which generated nearly $2 million in bonds to finance the beginning of the Zoo's restoration. The volunteers formally rallied as Friends of the Zoo, and in 1973, Ron Forman—the City Hall Liaison for Audubon Park—came on board with a grand vision that evolved into a new master plan for the Zoo. Forman and the Audubon Commission expanded the Zoo to its current 58 acres, allowing for sweeping natural habitats that mirrored wild environments: the African Savanna, North American Grasslands and the South American Pampas.

Woldenberg Park opened in 1989, the same year the Friends of the Zoo evolved into Audubon Nature Institute. The Aquarium followed in 1990.

=== 2000s: focus on conservation ===
In the next decade, the Aquarium expanded into a new wing housing a theater and a Changing Exhibits Gallery, while Woldenberg Park also extended its borders.

== Effects of Hurricane Katrina ==
The 2005 Hurricane Katrina caused substantial physical destruction, wiping out all Audubon operating revenues and forcing the layoff of nearly 600 employees. Nevertheless, Aquarium staff remained at their posts throughout the storm, as well as the subsequent flooding, doing what they could for the animals in their charge.

== Miscellany ==
The institute was the executive producer of "Hurricane on the Bayou", an IMAX film released on the anniversary of Hurricane Katrina's landfall in 2006.

The institute is no longer a part of the National Wetlands Coalition, but it is a "cooperating organization" with America's Wetland Campaign; which is sponsored by British Gas, Citgo, ConocoPhillips, Shell Oil and other oil and gas companies.

== Gallery ==
Some of the areas managed include:

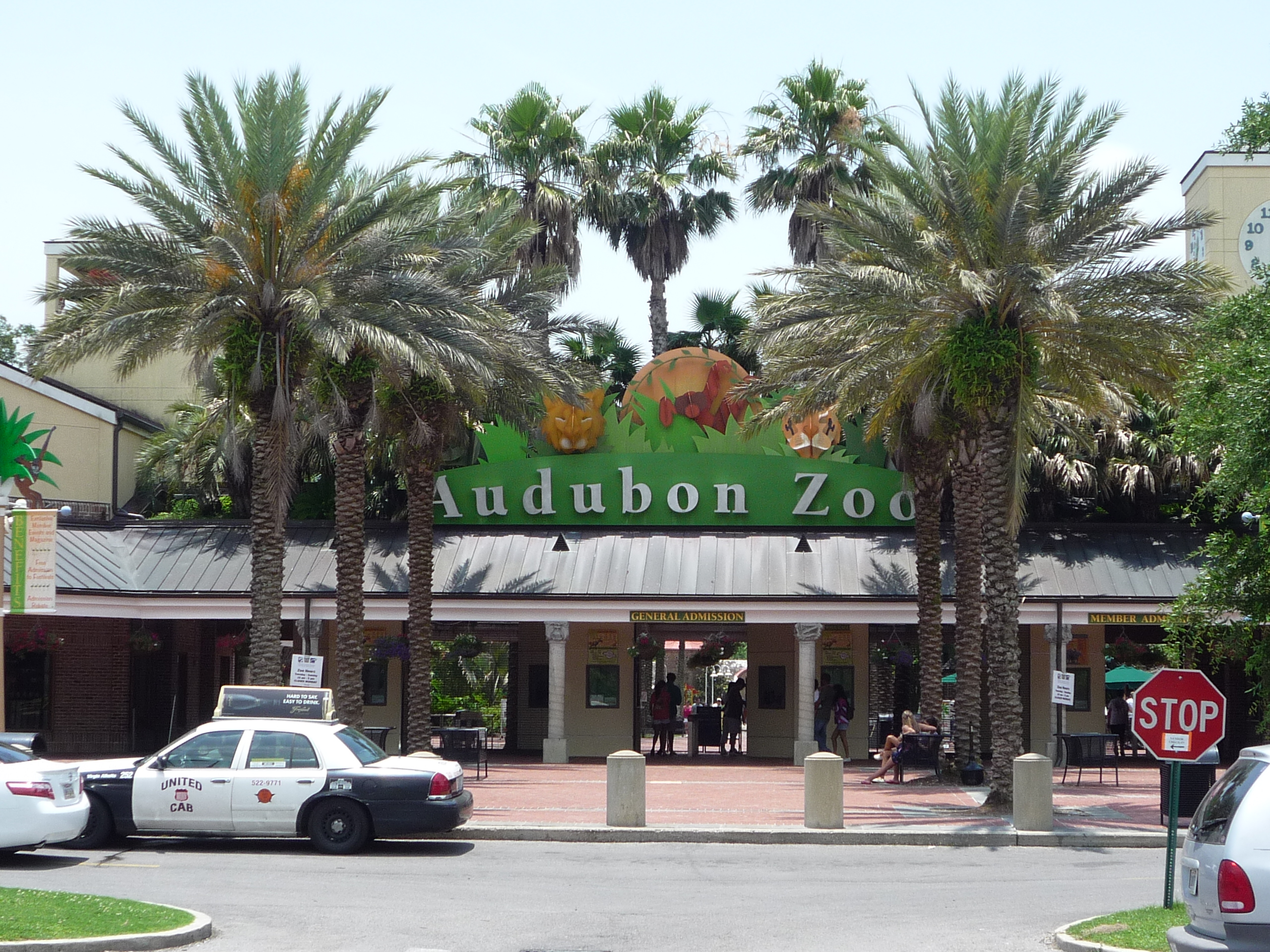
Audubon Zoo

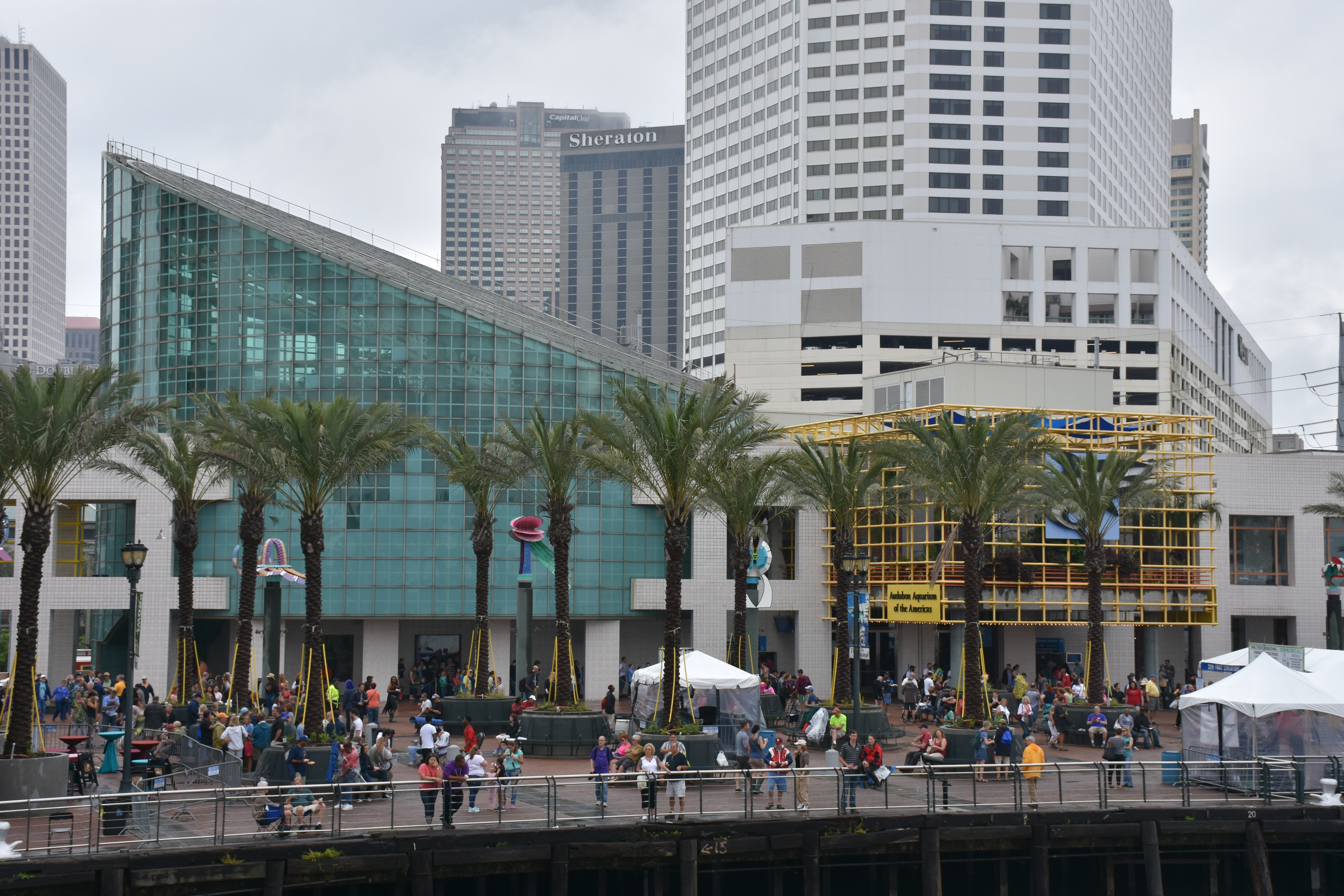
Audubon Aquarium

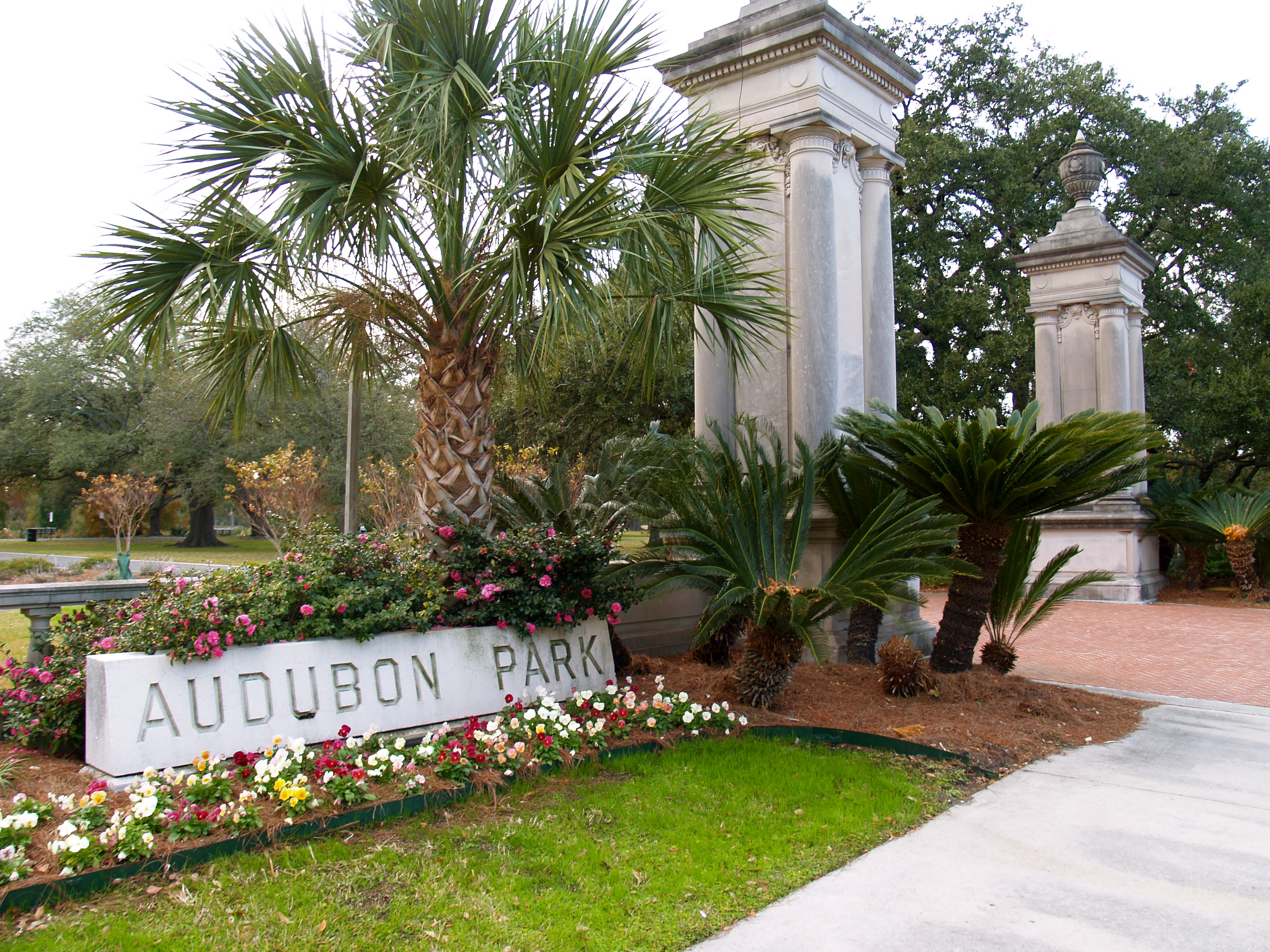
Audubon Park

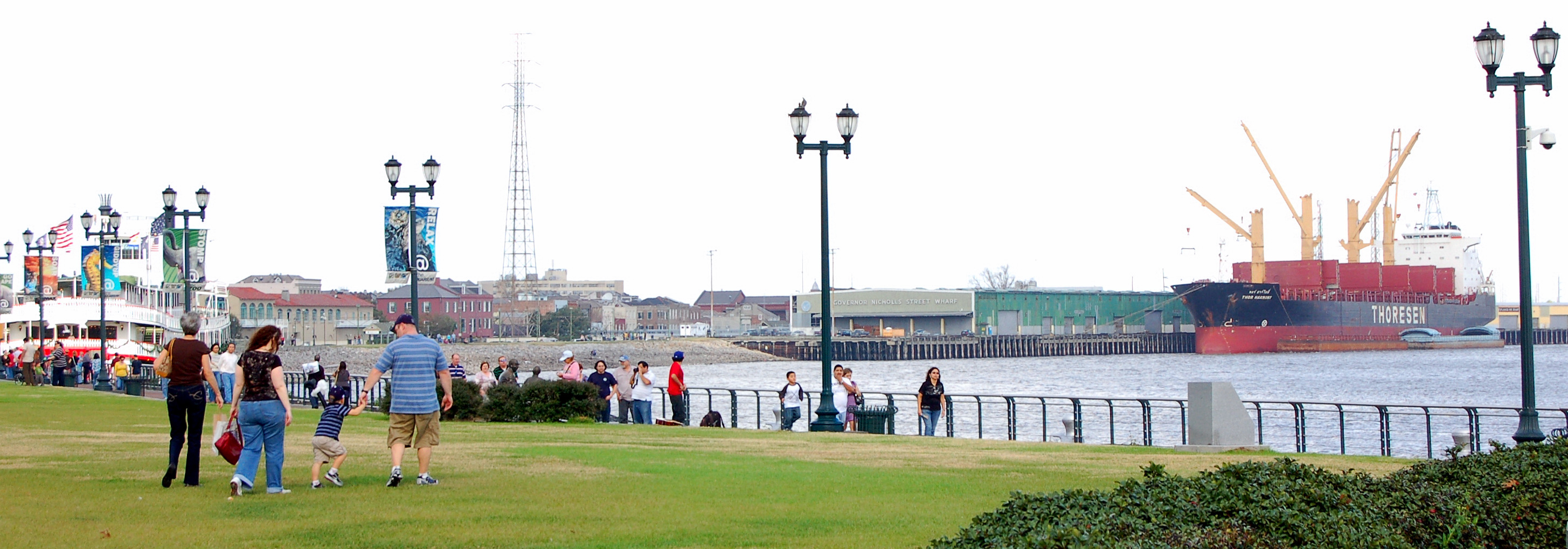
Woldenberg Park
