= Ray Nagin =

American politician and businessman (born 1956)

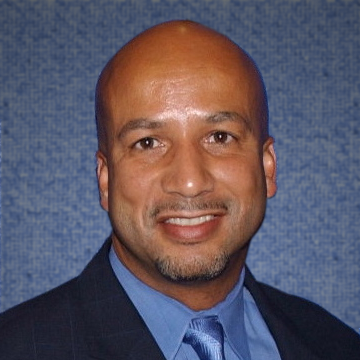
- Nagin in June 2006

60th Mayor of New Orleans
- In office May 6, 2002 – May 3, 2010
- Preceded by: Marc Morial
- Succeeded by: Mitch Landrieu

Personal details
- Born: Clarence Ray Nagin Jr. June 11, 1956 (age 70) New Orleans, Louisiana, U.S.
- Party: Democratic
- Spouse: Seletha Smith (m. 1982)
- Children: 3
- Education: Tuskegee University (BS); Tulane University (MBA)

Clarence Ray Nagin Jr. (born June 11, 1956) is an American former businessman and politician who served as the 60th Mayor of New Orleans, Louisiana, from May 2002 to May 2010.

Nagin became internationally known in 2005 in the aftermath of Hurricane Katrina. His wider response to the disaster was widely criticized for his delayed evacuation order, failure to utilize available city resources like school buses for evacuation, and for ordering residents to a poorly equipped Superdome as a shelter of last resort. He has faced accusations that these actions contributed to the deaths of many residents and demonstrated poor leadership during the crisis.

Before entering politics, he held executive roles at Cox Communications. After leaving office, he founded a consulting firm and self-published a book about his experiences during and after the hurricane. In 2014, Nagin was convicted on charges of wire fraud, bribery and money laundering related to a city corruption scandal and was sentenced to ten years in federal prison.

== Early life and business career ==
Nagin was born on June 11, 1956, in New Orleans' Charity Hospital, to a family of modest means. His childhood was typical of that of urban youth, and his father held two jobs: a janitor at New Orleans City Hall by night and a fabric cutter at a clothing factory by day. After the factory shut down, his father became a fleet mechanic at a local dairy to earn sufficient pay to support his family. His mother was employed as manager of a Kmart in-store restaurant.

The family lived on Allen Street in the 7th Ward, followed by a stay near their family parish, St. Peter Claver Catholic Church in Tremé, and then a move to the Cutoff section of Algiers. Nagin attended St. Augustine High School and O. Perry Walker High School, where he played basketball and baseball. He enrolled at historically black Tuskegee University in Tuskegee, Alabama, on a baseball scholarship, played on championship teams, and graduated with a Bachelor of Science degree in Accounting in 1978. He became a Certified Public Accountant.

After graduating from college, he went to work in the purchasing department at General Motors in Detroit, Michigan. He moved to Los Angeles, California, then to Dallas, Texas in 1981 to take Internal Audit Manager and Division Controller jobs with Associates Corporation.

In 1982, Nagin married Seletha Smith, a New Orleans native. Together, they had three children. In 1985, Nagin returned to New Orleans to become the controller of Cox New Orleans, the city's cable television franchise, run by the Cox media conglomerate. The franchise had a history of customer complaints, low profits, and stagnant growth, and was one of the poorest-performing components within Cox. Nagin was quickly promoted to general manager. In 1989, he was appointed to oversee all of Cox properties in south Louisiana as vice-president and general manager of Cox Louisiana, earning $400,000 annually, according to CNBC's "American Greed".

In 1993, Nagin enrolled in the executive MBA program at Tulane University. Nagin also lobbied at the local, State, and Federal government levels, as many of the businesses he managed were regulated and required formal franchise renewals. His public profile was high because he hosted a twice-weekly television call-in show for customers.

In 1995, Nagin received the Young Leadership Council Diversity and Role Model Award and later sat on the boards of the United Way and Covenant House. He also was one of the founders and president of 100 Black Men of metro New Orleans, an affiliate of the national organization of black businessmen.

Nagin was a partner in a group that brought the New Orleans Brass to the city. Nagin became the team's president and investors' spokesman as they secured the hockey franchise. The initial popularity of the team allowed the group to secure the 18,000-seat New Orleans Arena as its home venue. That year, the local alternative newspaper Gambit Weekly named Nagin as its New Orleanian of the Year.

== Political affiliation ==
In 2004, he endorsed John Kerry for president. Following media reports that he had previously been a registered Republican, Nagin addressed those claims on Tavis Smiley Show in 2006, stating that he "never was a Republican" and that he has been a "life-long Democrat", and several news organizations that reported he was originally a Republican were forced to issue retractions. However, he periodically gave contributions to candidates of both parties, including Representative Billy Tauzin in 1999 and 2000, as well as Democratic Senators John Breaux and J. Bennett Johnston, Jr. earlier in the decade. Nagin endorsed conservative Republican Bobby Jindal over conservative Democratic Lieutenant Governor Kathleen Blanco in the 2003 runoff for governor.

== 2002 mayoral election ==
Nagin entered the race for mayor on the final day of qualifying. Shortly before the primary mayoral election, on January 17, 2002, the New Orleans Times Picayune and Gambit Weekly endorsed Nagin.

In the first round of the mayoral election in February 2002, Nagin won first place with 29 percent of the vote. Some of his opponents were the Police Chief Richard Pennington, State Senator Paulette Irons, and City Councilman Troy Carter. In the runoff on Saturday, March 2, 2002, Nagin defeated Richard Pennington with 59 percent of the votes to become the 60th mayor of New Orleans.

== First mayoral term ==
The 2004 Comprehensive Annual Financial Report of the City of New Orleans, as certified by CPA firm KPMG, highlighted many significant accomplishments of the Nagin administration. New Orleans gained 4,500 jobs that year. U.S. Census Bureau figures showed about 38,000 New Orleanians had risen out of poverty as the national average increased. According to The American City Business Journal, per capita income in New Orleans was rising at the fastest rate in the nation.

Southern Business and Development named New Orleans number eight on the list of "comeback kids" in the south. New Orleans had back-to-back record tourist years, 10.1 million in 2004. A Yahoo/National Geographic Traveler poll named the city its number one family destination. Since 2002, the area had seen over $400 million of film productions, including movies like the Oscar award-winning Ray, starring Jamie Foxx, and All the King's Men, featuring Sean Penn. According to MovieMaker Magazine, New Orleans was the fourth-best place to film a movie and had earned the title "Hollywood South".

In November 2004, the Nagin administration passed the city's largest bond issue, $260 million. New Orleans also jumped from 69th to 38th on Intel's list of "Most Wired Cities". The city's website went from being unranked to the 4th best in the nation.

As Hurricane Ivan threatened the Gulf of Mexico in September 2004, Nagin urged New Orleanians to prepare for the storm. He advised those planning to stay not only to stock up on food and water, but also to make sure they had "an axe in the attic", a reference to the many people trapped in their attics by rising floodwaters when Hurricane Betsy hit the city in 1965. Nagin issued a voluntary evacuation call at 6:00 p.m. on September 30th, leading to heavy interstate traffic as some 600,000 metro New Orleanians left.

=== Hurricane Katrina ===
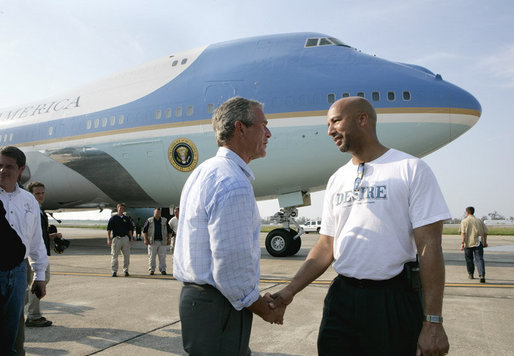
U.S. President George W. Bush and Mayor Ray Nagin meet on September 2, 2005

In August 2005, Hurricane Katrina entered the Gulf of Mexico. Early on Friday, August 26, Mayor Nagin advised New Orleanians to keep a close eye on the storm and prepare for evacuation. He then made several public statements encouraging people to leave but promising that if they did not evacuate, "[w]e will take care of you". By 10:00 a.m. Saturday, a mandatory evacuation was called for low-lying areas in the surrounding parishes—St. Charles, St. Tammany, Plaquemines, and Jefferson—and a voluntary evacuation for St. Bernard Parish. Nagin had, however, ignored federal and state offers to assist and a recommendation to evacuate the entire city.

In addition to the parishes' announcements, President George W. Bush declared a federal state of emergency for Louisiana.

In accordance with the regional evacuation plan, New Orleans, along with the surrounding areas of Jefferson and St. Charles parishes, were given formal voluntary evacuation orders around 50 hours from Katrina's landfall. This phased approach along with "contraflow", wherein all incoming interstate highway lanes are reversed outward, ensured that additional vehicles moving onto already congested roads would not create massive gridlock. The local newspaper reported that Nagin stopped short of ordering a mandatory evacuation because of concerns about the city's liability for closing hotels and other businesses.

After receiving a late night Saturday call from Max Mayfield, head of the National Hurricane Center, Nagin was advised that Katrina was headed to New Orleans. He ordered the city attorney to prepare legal documents for a mandatory evacuation of the city, the first in New Orleans' almost 300-year history. On Sunday, August 28 at 9:30 a.m., the mandatory evacuation order was signed and communicated to the public. The Superdome was opened as a shelter of last resort, and police went throughout the city with loudspeakers alerting all remaining citizens to head to key pickup points for free bus rides. By Sunday evening 80% of New Orleanians and visitors were evacuated or relocated.

After the hurricane hit, the federally built and maintained levees collapsed throughout the city. Eighty percent of the city flooded, some areas as high as 20 feet, over rooftops. Food and water became scarce, and looting was common. After hearing reports of this, Nagin criticized the federal and state response on WWL radio, and his passionate outburst went viral.

In response to a question at a town hall meeting in October 2005, Nagin said: "I can see in your eyes, you want to know, '[h]ow do I take advantage of this incredible opportunity? How do I make sure New Orleans is not overrun with Mexican workers?'" Some Hispanic groups, including the United States Hispanic Chamber of Commerce, criticized Nagin's statement, although those attending the town hall meeting reportedly applauded—many believing jobs should first go to locals displaced by the hurricane. Despite this comment, Nagin went on to say this was the city's biggest economic opportunity and urged New Orleanians to get more comfortable working beside someone who did not look like them, as everyone's help was needed. During a subsequent interview on Telemundo with Jose Diaz-Balart, Nagin praised the great work Hispanic workers did in New Orleans and said the city would not have recovered without them.

=== "Chocolate City" speech ===
Shortly after Katrina devastated New Orleans, there were calls for moratoriums on rebuilding certain neighborhoods. Two weeks after Katrina struck, Nagin took a weekend trip to Dallas to reunite with his family. While there, he was asked to meet with leading New Orleans businessmen to discuss the city's future. Nagin says he made it clear at the meeting that everyone had a right to return home, a claim contradicted by some businessmen in attendance.

Many of the initial proposals to rebuild New Orleans focused on rebuilding areas with the highest likelihood of economic return. Many groups expressed concern that this might radically change the racial make-up of the city. The land deemed most economically viable was mostly city land above sea-level, in which the most economically-advantaged and white citizens resided; the majority of New Orleanians, especially black residents, lived in the outer edges of the city, where land was mostly below sea-level and deemed less economically viable.

Nagin disavowed such proposals, and in response to residents' concerns, he used the phrase "Chocolate City" to signal that New Orleans would remain a majority black city. He first used the phrase during a Martin Luther King Jr. Day celebration speech in New Orleans on January 16, 2006 and repeated the metaphor several times. This was seized upon and parodied by some commentators, cartoons, and merchandising. Various designs of T-shirts with satirical depictions of Nagin as Willy Wonka were sold in the city and on the Internet.

Nagin also said that New Orleans "will be a majority African-American city because this was what God wants it to be." Some people found the implication of Nagin claiming to know God's will to be as troubling as the racial aspects of his speech. He then condemned Washington D.C., by saying God "sent us hurricane after hurricane after hurricane, and it's destroyed and put stress on this country", suggesting God's disapproval of the 2003 invasion of Iraq.

In an interview with Tavis Smiley broadcast on Public Radio International on January 13, 2006, Nagin said he used the phrase "chocolate city" in reference to a time in the 1970s when African Americans were just starting to exercise political power in places like Washington, D.C. The term had been used in many of Nagin's previous speeches and welcoming addresses to visitors of the city. The idea reportedly originated with the song "Chocolate City" by the popular 1970s funk group Parliament.

== 2006 mayoral election ==
At the time of the 2006 election, at least two-thirds of New Orleans' residents were still displaced. One candidate said in his Times Picayune interview he was running because the city's demographics had dramatically changed. There were three unsuccessful lawsuits filed to prevent delaying the original election date.

In the April 22 election, Nagin was the front runner with 38% of the vote. Louisiana Lieutenant Governor Mitch Landrieu came in second with 29%. Nagin and Landrieu faced each other in a run-off election on May 20, 2006. Nagin defeated Landrieu 52% to 48%.

== Second mayoral term ==
Nagin's second term began on June 1, 2006. He was intensely criticized by the local media throughout this term. For example, his "100-day plan" to accelerate the rebuilding of New Orleans was bashed for what critics said was a tardy release, lack of details and activity in moving forward. Nagin administration spokesperson Rob Couhig backed away from a 100-day promise, stating that it was not meant as a "time period," but as a short-range initiative to improve quality-of-life issues. Delays in FEMA reimbursements and federal recovery dollars reaching the city caused many significant delays.

He was also a member of the Mayors Against Illegal Guns Coalition, an organization formed in 2006 and co-chaired by New York City mayor Michael Bloomberg and Boston mayor Thomas Menino.

In 2006, Nagin was also criticized for devoting time to extensive lobbying in Washington, DC and a national speaking tour. Nagin's administration said this was necessary in order to correct inaccurate perceptions of New Orleans and secure recovery support.

In addition during 2007, a drastic increase in the city's violent crime rate led to more criticism of Nagin. Nagin called for and got help from the Louisiana National Guard and U.S. Justice Department. However, Nagin continued to be heavily criticized by the local newspaper. He reignited complaints when he said news of two killings should keep focus on the city's needs for more help and, "while sad, keeps the New Orleans brand out there."

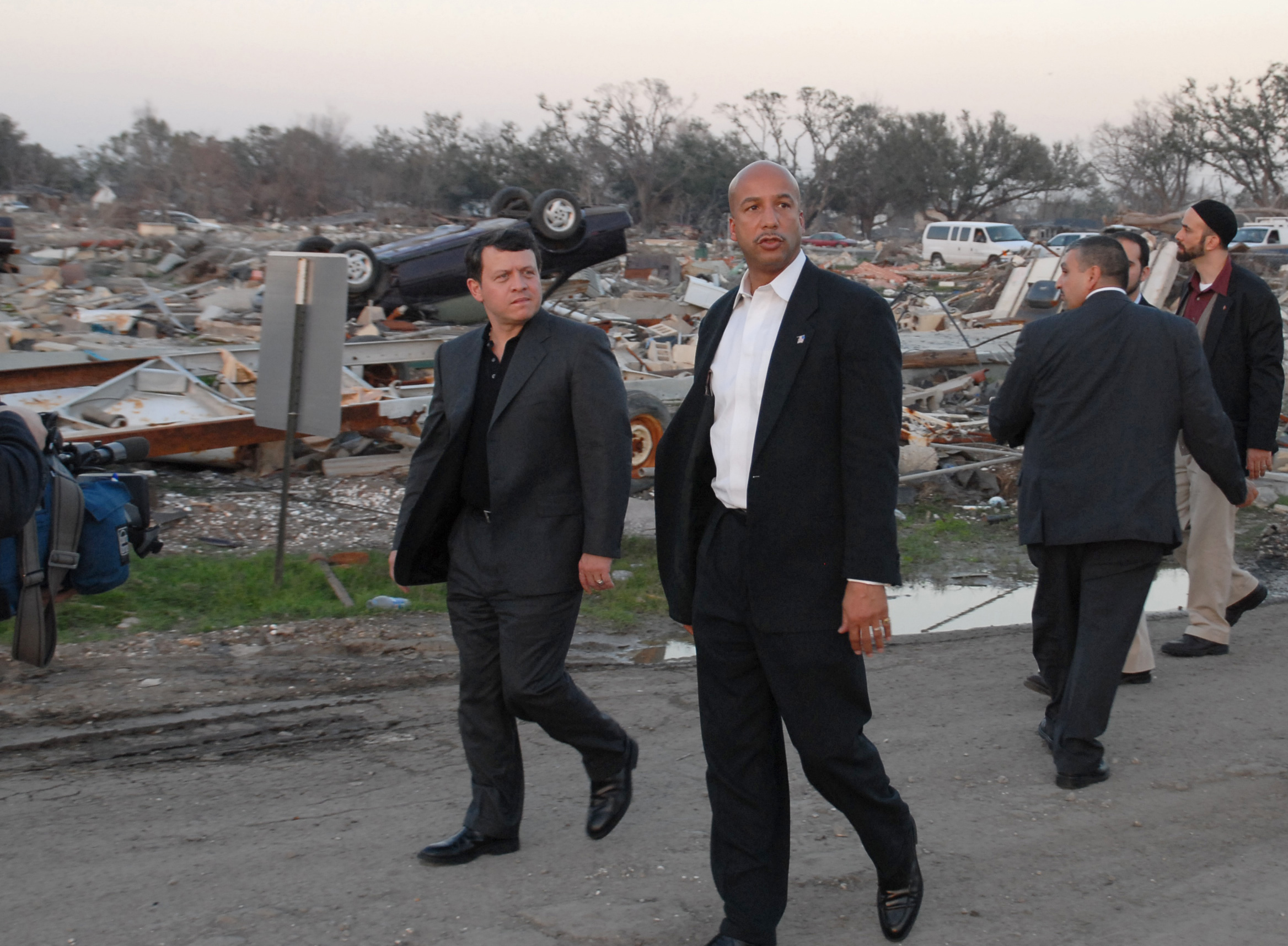
King Abdullah of Jordan with Mayor C. Ray Nagin

Nagin hired recovery expert Dr. Ed Blakely in 2007 to head up a dedicated Office of Recovery Management. The Rockefeller, Ford and Bill & Melinda Gates foundations provided grants for critical staff enhancements. During the end of 2007 and into 2008 Nagin guided the city through an extensive planning process that documented a $14 billion need. However, the state only allocated 2% of the plan and it took almost three years to receive any of these federal recovery dollars.

By years 4 and 5, New Orleans made significant progress toward recovery. Eighty-five percent of all city managed recovery projects were either recently completed, under construction, or in final design. By the end of 2009, there were over $20 billion in public & private sector construction related projects underway.

Business Week said New Orleans was one of the best cities in America to ride out the great recession. Outside Magazine said New Orleans was the 20th best town in American to live in. The U.S. Department of Labor in its April 2010 report said New Orleans had the lowest unemployment in the nation.

Prior to leaving office in 2010, Nagin was appointed by Secretary of State Hillary Clinton to head the United States delegation to a state and local governments conference on assistance to post-earthquake Haiti held in Martinique. A recovery plan was completed and presented to donor nations resulting in Haiti receiving billions in pledges.

== Corruption allegations, indictments and convictions ==
On April 7, 2009, the Times-Picayune alleged a conflict of interest with regard to a trip Nagin took to Hawaii in 2004. The vacation Nagin, then-chief technology officer Greg Meffert, and their families took in 2004 was claimed to be partially paid for by Meffert but years later it was revealed that Meffert used a contractor's credit card to pay for Nagin's plane ticket. David Hammer of the Times-Picayune reported on April 23, 2009, that Nagin had taken "plenty of other trips" at the expense of NetMethods, a company owned by city vendor Mark St. Pierre.

In April 2009, Nagin was obliged "to sit for a deposition as part of a civil lawsuit over the city's controversial crime camera program." The Times-Picayune had obtained information that Mark St. Pierre, who allegedly paid for the holiday, had made substantial donations to Nagin's 2006 re-election campaign.

Meffert was later charged with 63 felony counts in what authorities said "was a lucrative kickback scheme." All but two of the counts were subsequently dropped and Meffert eventually pleaded guilty to one count of conspiracy to commit wire fraud and one count of filing a false income tax return.

In April 2010, as a result of a FOIA request from a New Orleans news station, Nagin was investigated for deleting his official city emails. After a forensic investigation by computer forensics firm SunBlock Systems, 5,400 emails were recovered. Many of these emails were subsequently used as evidence in his 2013 criminal trial.

In June 2012, Frank Fradella, who was facing major securities fraud charges, pleaded guilty in New Orleans federal court to one count of conspiracy to bribe a public official. According to The Times-Picayune, Fradella claims to have paid $50,000 and delivered truckloads of free granite to Nagin's sons' business in exchange for favorable treatment for Fradella's companies with city contracts.

On January 18, 2013, Nagin was indicted on 21 corruption charges, including wire fraud, conspiracy, bribery, money laundering and filing false tax returns related to bribes from city contractors. The 21-count federal corruption charges were issued by a grand jury. On February 20, 2013, Nagin pleaded not guilty in federal court to all charges. Despite New Orleans' long history of political corruption, Nagin was the first mayor to be criminally charged for corruption in office.

Nagin was convicted on 20 of the 21 counts by jury on February 12, 2014. These charges included that he had taken more than $500,000 in payouts from businessmen in exchange for millions of dollars' worth of city contracts.

=== Incarceration and release ===
Judge Helen Ginger Berrigan ordered a pre-sentencing investigation. On July 9, 2014, Nagin was sentenced to ten years of imprisonment and more than $585,000 in restitution and forfeiture. Berrigan recommended that Nagin be sent to the Federal Correctional Complex, Oakdale. On July 15, 2014, Nagin's attorney filed an appeal with the Fifth Circuit Court of Appeals. Nagin lost another appeal of his case in July 2019.

On September 3, 2014, a judge deemed Nagin indigent and ordered the Federal Public Defender's Office to take over his appeal. Nagin said he was near penniless and relying on food stamps. Nagin reported to the Federal Correctional Institution, Texarkana, a prison camp, on September 8, 2014. Nagin was assigned as prisoner Bureau of Prisons (BOP) #32751-034. The terms of the sentencing include a possible release date of no earlier than May 25, 2023. However, in response to the COVID-19 pandemic spreading in the prison, authorities released Nagin to house arrest on April 27, 2020.

Following his release to house arrest, Nagin remained under ‘community confinement’ for two years that ended in March 2022. He then served a two-year term of supervised probation, which concluded on March 16, 2024. Upon completing the terms of his supervised release, Nagin marked the occasion on social media with a quotation from Martin Luther King Jr.: “Free at last, free at last, Thank God Almighty, we are free at last.”

== See also ==
- Timeline of New Orleans
