= Falcons–Saints rivalry =

National Football League rivalry

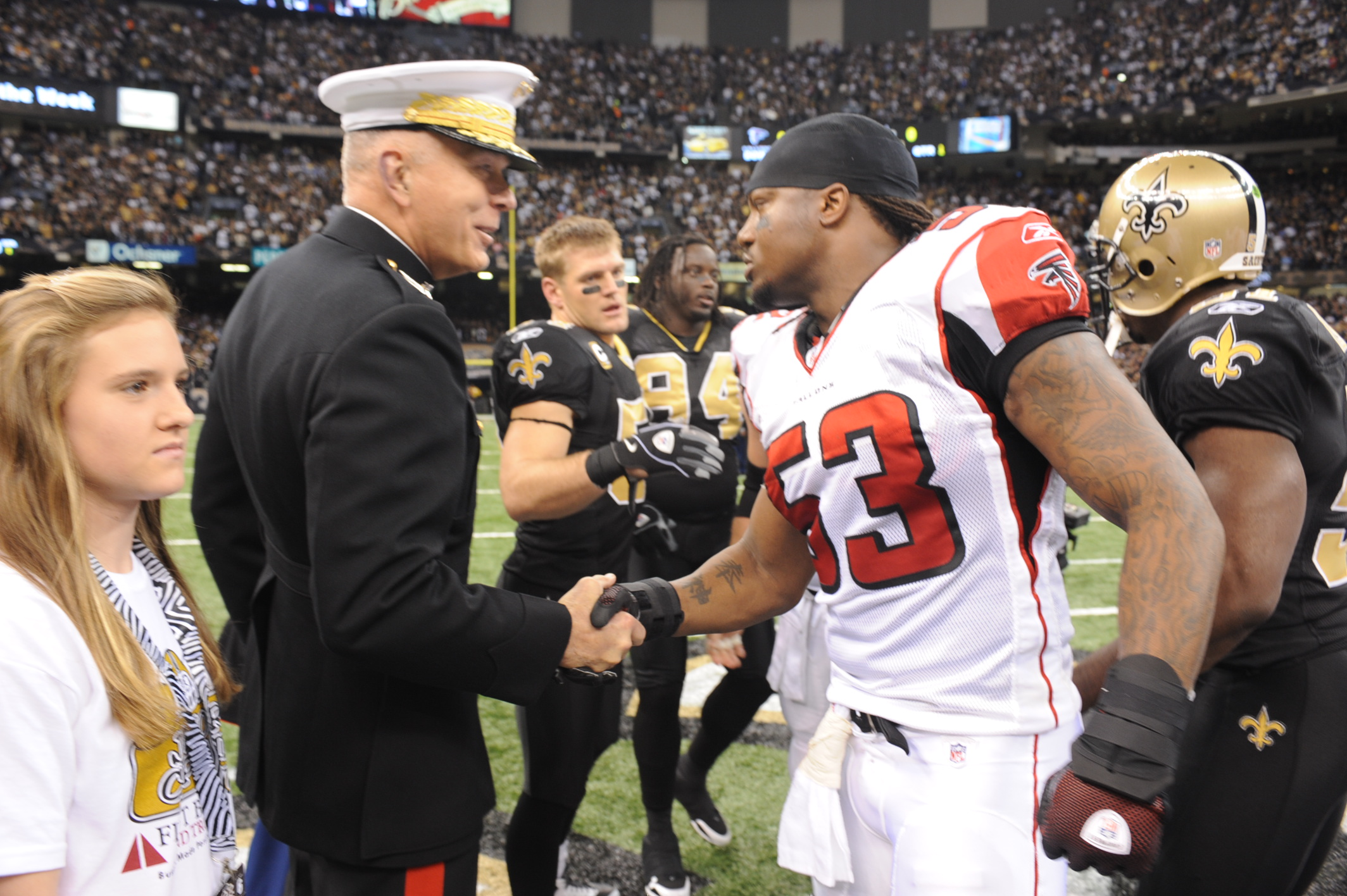
- Falcons and Saints face off during the 2009 season.

- Atlanta Falcons New Orleans Saints
- Location: Atlanta, New Orleans
- First meeting: November 20, 1967; Falcons 24, Saints 27
- Latest meeting: October 5, 2026; Falcons 45, Saints 24
- Next meeting: January 3, 2027
- Stadiums: Falcons: Mercedes-Benz Stadium; Saints: Caesars Superdome

Statistics
- Total meetings: 115
- All-time series: Falcons: 59–56
- Regular season series: Falcons: 58–56
- Postseason results: Falcons: 1–0
- Largest victory: Falcons: 62–7 (1973); Saints: 38–0 (1987)
- Most points scored: Falcons: 62 (1973); Saints: 48 (2023)
- Longest win streak: Falcons: 10 (1995–1999); Saints: 6 (1986–1989)
- Current win streak: Falcons: 3 (2025–present)

Post–season history
- 1991 NFC Wild Card: Falcons won: 27–20
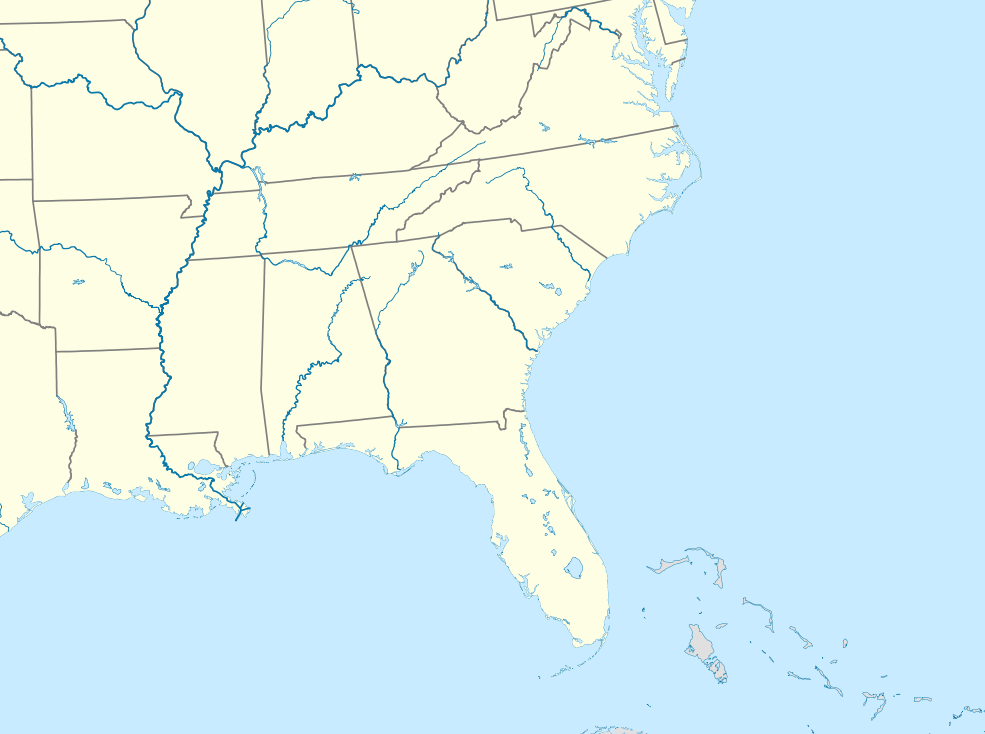

The Falcons–Saints rivalry is a National Football League (NFL) rivalry between the Atlanta Falcons and New Orleans Saints.

The rivalry began in 1967 when the Saints entered the NFL as an expansion team; the Falcons had joined the league a year earlier. The two teams were the NFL's first in the traditional Deep South, which along with the Dallas Cowboys helped break the Washington Redskins decades-long monopoly as the NFL's only team located in the Southern United States. The teams were both placed in the NFC West in 1970, resulting in the teams playing two games against each other every year since (except for the strike-shortened 1987 season). The teams were both placed in the newly-formed NFC South in the 2002 realignment.

The national media rarely noted the series during the teams' first decades of existence, probably due to both teams' long stretches of futility. However, during the late 2000s and 2010s, both teams sustained success and routinely battled for the top spot in the NFC South. Despite both teams' lack of success for much of their histories, games between the two teams have riveted their respective regions for more than 50 years; fans of both teams consider the other their most important and hated opponent. ESPN.com writer Len Pasquarelli has cited the rivalry as one of the best in sports: "Every year, bus caravans loaded with rowdy (and usually very inebriated) fans make the seven-hour trip between the two cities. Unless you've attended a Falcons-Saints debauchery-filled afternoon, you'll just have to take my word for how much fun it really can be." Longtime starting quarterbacks Drew Brees of the Saints and Matt Ryan of the Falcons have faced one another 23 times when starting, a record for most matchups between two starting quarterbacks in the Super Bowl era.

The September 25, 2006 match-up, which served as the Louisiana Superdome's official reopening after Hurricane Katrina, was considered a major milestone in New Orleans' and the Gulf Coast's recovery from the effects of the storm as well as the Saints' return to the city after their own year-long exile after the storm; the Saints later erected a statue outside the Superdome of Steve Gleason blocking Michael Koenen's punt to commemorate their win in that game.

The Falcons lead the series, 59–56. The two teams have met once in the playoffs, with the Falcons winning the 1991 NFC Wild Card Game.

== History ==
=== Notable games in the series ===
- The rivalry first began to heat up when the two teams became division opponents in 1970, allowing them to play twice per season. Both teams were placed in the National Football Conference's West Division that year.
- Atlanta's 62–7 victory at Tulane Stadium in 1973 remains the largest loss in Saints history, with a 55-point margin of defeat.
- A pair of last-minute wins by Atlanta in 1978 with playoff implications helped to intensify the rivalry. With the Falcons down 17–13 in a late-season match-up at the Superdome and only 0:19 left, Falcons quarterback Steve Bartkowski aired a Hail Mary pass (called in the playbook "Big Ben Right") down to the end zone; the ball was tipped by Falcons receiver Wallace Francis into the hands of his teammate Alfred Jackson, giving the Falcons a 20–17 victory. The teams met again two weeks later in Atlanta. Once again, the Falcons trailed 17–13, with only 0:53 remaining and on their own 28-yard line; Bartkowski led the team down the field and scored with only five seconds left, stunning the Saints and propelling the Falcons to their very first playoff berth. The Falcons finished 9–7, while the Saints finished 7–9; the two last-second victories had decided the final 1978 playoffs slot.
- After a third straight wild win by Atlanta (this time in overtime) to open the 1979 season, the Saints had had enough and blew out the Falcons in the second of the two 1979 meetings, 37–6.
- The only postseason meeting was played in the wild-card round on December 28, 1991, in New Orleans. The Saints entered the 1991 playoffs as the NFC West champions while the Falcons were a wild card team. Atlanta won the game, 27–20, as Falcons quarterback Chris Miller threw the game-winning 61-yard touchdown pass to wide receiver Michael Haynes with 2:41 left in the fourth quarter.
- In the midst of New Orleans' troubled 2005 season in the wake of Hurricane Katrina, they lost to the Falcons in a "home" game in San Antonio. The Saints raced to a 10–3 lead in the second quarter before a fumble was returned by DeAngelo Hall of the Falcons for a 66-yard touchdown to tie the game. On the final play of the second quarter, the Falcons blocked a field goal try and Demorrio Williams ran back a 59-yard touchdown. An exchange of six touchdowns ensued and Devery Henderson caught a 15-yard game-tying score, leaving the game 31–31 in the final minute of regulation. After a Saints penalty on a questionable call, Falcons kicker Todd Peterson's 36-yard field goal on the final play resulted in a 34–31 Falcons win. Saints coach Jim Haslett was so angry over the late penalty that he repeatedly ripped the "chickenshit" calls by referee Bill Carollo and his crew.
- The Falcons were the opponent in the Saints' first game in New Orleans after Hurricane Katrina devastated the city and the team, held on September 25, 2006. The Saints won the nationally televised match 23–3. At the time, the game was the highest-rated program in the history of ESPN and the second-highest-rated cable program. Early in the first quarter, Saints safety Steve Gleason blocked a punt by Falcons kicker Michael Koenen and Curtis Deloatch recovered the ball in the Falcons' end zone for a Saints touchdown. The Saints dominated the game and went on to have the most successful season in their history up to that time. In July 2012, "Rebirth", a statue depicting Gleason blocking the punt, was erected outside the Superdome; a news report commented that the blocked punt "etched Steve Gleason into Saints lore and became symbolic of New Orleans' resilience in the face of disaster".
- The Saints were on a quest for an undefeated season in 2009 when, on November 2, they hosted the Falcons on Monday Night Football. Atlanta led 14–7 after one quarter. New Orleans then erupted with 21 second quarter points and held off a late Atlanta comeback effort when a Darren Sharper intercepted a Matt Ryan pass at the Saints 5, ending a 35–27 Saints win. The win raised New Orleans to a 13–0 record; they won Super Bowl XLIV.
- In the 2010 season, both games had important implications for the playoff race. The Falcons won a week 3 match-up at the Superdome 27–24 in overtime (after Saints kicker Garrett Hartley made a last-second field goal to tie the game in regulation, but then missed another kick that would have won it in overtime). The win gave Atlanta an advantage in the standings that the Falcons retained all season. In the Week 16 rematch, the teams met for the fifth time in six seasons on Monday Night Football, with the NFC South title still on the line; in a typically close game the Saints held on for a 17–14 win, clinching a playoff berth.
- In the 2011 season, both teams met again for a Monday Night Football match-up. Like the previous season, playoff implications were at stake for both teams, however, in a near-inverse of the 2010 meeting, New Orleans, entered Week 16 with an 11–3 record with a playoff berth already clinched, were in better position to win the NFC South division title, and needed a win in one of their final two games or an Atlanta loss in one of their final two games to clinch the division title, while Atlanta, entering Week 16 with a 9–5 record, needed to win out as well as for New Orleans to lose against Carolina in Week 17 to repeat as NFC South champions. A major historical aspect of this game was Saint Drew Brees' pursuit of Dan Marino's single season record for passing yards, 5084, set in 1984. Entering the game with 4780 yards, Brees needed only 305 in his final two games to obtain the record. Atlanta received the opening kickoff and quickly jumped out to a 3–0 lead but the Saints immediately responded with an 84-yard touchdown drive sparked by Brees' 38-yard completion to Lance Moore on the drive's first play. Brees would end the first quarter with 66 yards. By halftime, Brees was within 75 yards of the record with 230 yards in the first half, thanks in large part to the 164 yards he notched in the second quarter, which lifted the Saints to a 21–10 lead. Despite only having 45 yards in the third quarter, Brees managed to help the Saints extend their lead to 31–13 and he entered the fourth quarter 30 yards shy of Marino's record. The fourth quarter was somewhat atypical of how the Saints had played during the first three quarters in that they punted for the first time in the game and were held to a three-and-out for the third straight possession dating back to the third quarter when they had to settle for a field goal after failing to get a first down following Darren Sproles' 92-yard kickoff return which set them up with excellent field position at the Atlanta 14-yard line. Continuing the breaking of trends was the Saints' defense, which came into the game having forced the fewest turnovers of any defense in the league. That improved when linebacker Scott Shanle stripped the football from Falcons' wide receiver Julio Jones at the Falcons' 35-yard line and Saints' free safety Malcolm Jenkins grabbed the ball bouncing off the turf in stride and ran 30 yards down the sideline for a touchdown, extending the lead to 38–16. With zero completions or yards through the Saints' first two fourth-quarter possessions, it appeared uncertain if Brees would be able to get the record in front of a national audience in prime time but after the Saints' defense succeeded in stopping the Falcons on fourth down for the second straight possession and having taken over at the Falcons' 32-yard line with Brees needing just 30 for the record, the stage was set for history. On the ensuing drive, Brees completed a 12-yard pass to Marques Colston and an 11-yarder to Devery Henderson, coming to within 7 yards of the record. After an incomplete pass on first and goal from the Falcons' 9-yard line, Brees connected with running back Darren Sproles at the 1-yard line by the left hash mark and he carried it into the end zone, completing the quest for the record with Brees at 5087 yards through 15 games and capping off the scoring for the game with the Saints winning 45–16 and clinching the NFC South division title, their third since Sean Payton became head coach in 2006 and fifth in franchise history. Brees ended the night completing 23 of his 39 passing attempts for 307 yards, four touchdowns and two interceptions; it was also his 12th game of the season with at least 300 yards passing, an NFL record.
- In 2012, the Saints struggled through a down year after incurring heavy league penalties from their bounty scandal, but the Saints still managed to hand the Falcons their first loss of the season, 31–27 at the Superdome in week 10. Three weeks later in Atlanta, Drew Brees threw 5 interceptions and his record of consecutive games with a touchdown pass was snapped as the Falcons controlled the rematch 23–13.
- In 2013, the teams met in a Week 1 match-up. The Saints held off a late Atlanta drive to win 23–17, then went on to win their first five games while the Falcons, hampered by injuries, suffered through a loss-filled campaign. In the rematch, the Saints again held on to win another close game, 17–13, marked by Brees moving past Warren Moon into fifth place on the all-time career passing list.
- The January 1, 2017 match-up was the final regular season NFL game played in the Georgia Dome. In the Falcons' 38–32 victory, Atlanta clinched the first-round bye as the second seed in the playoffs.
- On December 7, 2017 the two teams had their first meeting at Atlanta's new Mercedes-Benz Stadium. With the Falcons leading 20–17, Saints quarterback Drew Brees was intercepted by linebacker Deion Jones in the end zone with less than two minutes remaining in regulation. New Orleans still had the possibility of gaining another possession but that ended when Saints Head Coach Sean Payton was flagged for unsportsmanlike conduct for running onto the field and arguing with a game official. The penalty gave Atlanta a first down allowing the Falcons to keep possession and win the game 20–17.
- On September 23, 2018 New Orleans beat Atlanta at Mercedes-Benz Stadium 43–37 in overtime, after nine lead changes throughout the game. Falcons quarterback Matt Ryan completed 26 of 35 attempts for 374 yards and a career high 5 touchdowns. Saints quarterback Drew Brees completed 39 of 49 pass attempts for 396 yards and 3 touchdowns and also ran for 2 touchdowns. In this game, Brees would break Brett Favre's NFL record for most career completions with 6,326.
- On November 10, 2019 the 7–1 Saints hosted the 1–7 Falcons in the Superdome. However, the 14-point underdog Falcons shocked the Saints, beating them by a score of 26–9. The Falcons defense, which had just seven sacks all season, recorded six on Drew Brees, and the Saints were held without a touchdown. Although the Saints finished the season 13–3, the loss forced the Saints to play on Wild-Card Weekend, in which the Saints lost at home to the Minnesota Vikings in overtime. The two meetings in 2019 would be the last between Brees and Matt Ryan, as Brees would miss both games against the Falcons in 2020 due to a rib injury, and announced his retirement on March 14, 2021. Brees and Ryan currently hold the record for most matchups between two starting quarterbacks in the Super Bowl era, with 23.
- On January 9, 2022, the two teams met at Mercedes-Benz Stadium for a game that had major playoff implications for the Saints. Although the Falcons were eliminated from playoff contention the week prior to this game, a win would give them a season sweep over the Saints and spoil their rival's playoff hopes. The Saints, meanwhile, needed a win plus a 49ers loss to make the playoffs. Saints QB Taysom Hill set the tone for the game early when he threw a touchdown pass to tight end Adam Trautman on the game's opening drive. Behind strong defensive play that featured three sacks and three takeaways, the Saints went on to beat the Falcons 30–20. Despite the win, however, a 49ers win over the Rams meant the Saints would miss the playoffs for the first time since 2016. This would turn out to be the final game in the series for Sean Payton and Matt Ryan, as Payton retired from coaching after the season and Ryan was traded to the Indianapolis Colts on March 21, 2022.
- On September 11, 2022, the two teams met at Mercedes-Benz Stadium during the opening week of the 2022 NFL season. The Falcons, behind new starting quarterback Marcus Mariota, jumped out to a 26–10 lead with just over 11 minutes remaining in the game. However, the Saints, behind the efforts of starting quarterback Jameis Winston and star wide receiver Michael Thomas, stormed back to take a 27–26 lead with just 19 seconds remaining in the game. The Falcons attempted a game winning field goal following an unnecessary roughness penalty by Saints Pro-Bowl cornerback Marshon Lattimore, but the attempt was blocked by Saints defensive end Payton Turner. The 16-point 4th quarter comeback was the largest 4th quarter comeback in New Orleans Saints history. Prior to the game, the Saints had a win-loss record of 0–208 when facing a deficit of at least 16 points in the 4th quarter.
- On January 7, 2024, the final game of the 2023 season ended in controversy. With the team up 41–17 after a dominant second-half comeback, Saints head coach Dennis Allen called for a quarterback kneel to exhaust the final minute of the game. Instead, quarterback Jameis Winston handed the ball to running back Jamaal Williams who scored a one-yard touchdown. Williams had failed to record a rushing touchdown during the season up to that point. Allen and Falcons coach Arthur Smith would have a heated exchange on the field following the game's end over the perceived lack of sportsmanship.
- On January 4, 2026, the two teams entered the final game of the 2025 season eliminated from playoff contention, but the contest determined whether the Carolina Panthers or the Tampa Bay Buccaneers would win the NFC South based on tiebreakers: an Atlanta win would give the division title to Carolina, and a New Orleans victory would give the division to Tampa Bay. Rookie Saints quarterback Tyler Shough threw a 16-yard touchdown to Ronnie Bell with 1:11 remaining in the game to cut the Falcons' lead to 19-17, but New Orleans could not recover ensuing onside kick, giving Atlanta the win and the NFC South championship to Carolina.

== Season-by-season results ==
Atlanta Falcons vs. New Orleans Saints Season-by-Season Results
1960s (Tie, 1–1)

Season	Results	Location	Overall series	Notes
1967	Saints; 27–24	Tulane Stadium	Saints; 1–0	The Saints join the NFL as an expansion team. They are placed in the Eastern Conference and the Capitol Division. They alternated annually with the New York Giants between the Capitol and Century Divisions until the 1970 season. Saints overcame a 21–3 deficit.
1969	Falcons 45–17	Atlanta Stadium	Tie; 1–1	

1970s (Falcons, 14–6)

Season	Season series	at Atlanta Falcons	at New Orleans Saints	Overall series	Notes
1970	Falcons 2–0	Falcons; 32–14	Falcons; 14–3	Falcons; 3–1	As a result of the AFL–NFL merger, the Falcons and Saints were placed in the National Football Conference (NFC) and the NFC West, resulting in two meetings annually.
1971	Falcons 2–0	Falcons; 28–6	Falcons; 24–20	Falcons; 5–1	
1972	Falcons 2–0	Falcons; 36–20	Falcons; 21–14	Falcons; 7–1	
1973	Falcons 2–0	Falcons; 14–10	Falcons; 62–7	Falcons; 9–1	Falcons win 9 straight meetings (1969–1973). In New Orleans, Falcons set franchise records with their largest victory overall with a 55–point differential and their most points scored in a game. Meanwhile, the Saints set franchise records for their worst loss overall and their most points allowed in a game.
1974	Saints 2–0	Saints; 13–3	Saints; 14–13	Falcons; 9–3	Saints record their first road win against the Falcons. Last meeting at Tulane Stadium.
1975	Tie 1–1	Falcons; 14–7	Saints; 23–7	Falcons; 10–4	Saints open the Louisiana Superdome (now known as Caesars Superdome).
1976	Tie 1–1	Falcons; 23–20	Saints; 30–0	Falcons; 11–5	
1977	Tie 1–1	Falcons; 35–7	Saints; 21–20	Falcons; 12–6	
1978	Falcons 2–0	Falcons; 20–17	Falcons; 20–17	Falcons; 14–6	The Falcons win both games on last-minute touchdowns.
1979	Tie 1–1	Saints; 37–6	Falcons; 40–34 (OT)	Falcons; 15–7	

1980s (Saints, 10–9)

Season	Season series	at Atlanta Falcons	at New Orleans Saints	Overall series	Notes
1980	Falcons 2–0	Falcons; 31–13	Falcons; 41–14	Falcons; 17–7	
1981	Falcons 2–0	Falcons; 27–0	Falcons; 41–10	Falcons; 19–7	
1982	Tie 1–1	Falcons; 35–0	Saints; 35–6	Falcons; 20–8	Both games are played despite the 1982 NFL players strike reducing the season to 9 games.
1983	Saints 2–0	Saints; 19–17	Saints; 27–10	Falcons; 20–10	
1984	Tie 1–1	Saints; 17–13	Falcons; 36–28	Falcons; 21–11	
1985	Falcons 2–0	Falcons; 31–24	Falcons; 16–10	Falcons; 23–11	
1986	Tie 1–1	Saints; 14–9	Falcons; 31–10	Falcons; 24–12	
1987	Saints 1–0	Saints; 38–0	canceled	Falcons; 24–13	Due to the 1987 NFL players strike, the game scheduled in New Orleans was canceled. Saints record their largest victory against the Falcons with a 38–point differential.
1988	Saints 2–0	Saints; 29–21	Saints; 10–9	Falcons; 24–15	
1989	Saints 2–0	Saints; 26–17	Saints; 20–13	Falcons; 24–17	

1990s (Falcons, 14–7)

Season	Season series	at Atlanta Falcons	at New Orleans Saints	Overall series	Notes
1990	Tie 1–1	Falcons; 28–27	Saints; 10–7	Falcons; 25–18	
1991	Tie 1–1	Saints; 27–6	Falcons; 23–20 (OT)	Falcons; 26–19	Last meeting at Atlanta–Fulton County Stadium.
1991 Playoffs	Falcons 1–0		Falcons 27–20	Falcons 27–19	First postseason meeting. NFC Wild Card.
1992	Saints 2–0	Saints; 10–7	Saints; 22–14	Falcons; 27–21	Falcons open Georgia Dome.
1993	Tie 1–1	Saints; 34–31	Falcons; 26–15	Falcons; 28–22	
1994	Saints 2–0	Saints; 29–20	Saints; 33–32	Falcons; 28–24	In New Orleans, Saints overcame a 20–3 deficit.
1995	Falcons 2–0	Falcons; 19–14	Falcons; 27–24 (OT)	Falcons; 30–24	
1996	Falcons 2–0	Falcons; 17–15	Falcons; 31–15	Falcons; 32–24	
1997	Falcons 2–0	Falcons; 20–3	Falcons; 23–17	Falcons; 34–24	
1998	Falcons 2–0	Falcons; 31–23	Falcons; 27–17	Falcons; 36–24	Falcons lose Super Bowl XXXIII.
1999	Falcons 2–0	Falcons; 35–12	Falcons; 20–17	Falcons; 38–24	Falcons win 10 straight meetings (1995–1999).

2000s (Saints, 13–7)

Season	Season series	at Atlanta Falcons	at New Orleans Saints	Overall series	Notes
2000	Saints 2–0	Saints; 21–19	Saints; 23–7	Falcons; 38–26	
2001	Tie 1–1	Saints; 28–10	Falcons; 20–13	Falcons; 39–27	
2002	Falcons 2–0	Falcons; 24–17	Falcons; 37–35	Falcons; 41–27	During the NFL realignment, the Falcons and Saints are both moved to the newly formed NFC South.
2003	Saints 2–0	Saints; 45–17	Saints; 23–20 (OT)	Falcons; 41–29	In New Orleans, Saints overcame a 20–3 second-half deficit.
2004	Tie 1–1	Falcons; 24–21	Saints; 26–13	Falcons; 42–30	
2005	Falcons 2–0	Falcons; 36–17	Falcons; 34–31	Falcons; 44–30	Due to Hurricane Katrina forcing the Saints to relocate for the season, Saints' home game was played at Alamodome in San Antonio, Texas.
2006	Saints 2–0	Saints; 31–13	Saints; 23–3	Falcons; 44–32	Saints hire HC Sean Payton and sign QB Drew Brees. Game in New Orleans marked the Saints' first game back home since Hurricane Katrina, highlighted by Saints' safety Steve Gleason blocking a Falcons' punt for a touchdown on the game's fourth play.
2007	Saints 2–0	Saints; 34–14	Saints; 22–16	Falcons; 44–34	Following the game in Atlanta, Falcons' HC Bobby Petrino abruptly resigned to take the job as head coach of the Arkansas Razorbacks.
2008	Tie 1–1	Falcons; 34–20	Saints; 29–25	Falcons; 45–35	Falcons draft QB Matt Ryan.
2009	Saints 2–0	Saints; 26–23	Saints; 35–27	Falcons; 45–37	Saints win Super Bowl XLIV.

2010s (Saints, 12–8)

Season	Season series	at Atlanta Falcons	at New Orleans Saints	Overall series	Notes
2010	Tie 1–1	Saints; 17–14	Falcons; 27–24 (OT)	Falcons; 46–38	
2011	Saints 2–0	Saints; 26–23 (OT)	Saints; 45–16	Falcons; 46–40	
2012	Tie 1–1	Falcons; 23–13	Saints; 31–27	Falcons; 47–41	Saints’ win handed the Falcons their first loss of the season after an 8–0 start.
2013	Saints 2–0	Saints; 17–13	Saints; 23–17	Falcons; 47–43	
2014	Falcons 2–0	Falcons; 37–34 (OT)	Falcons; 30–14	Falcons; 49–43	
2015	Saints 2–0	Saints; 20–17	Saints; 31–21	Falcons; 49–45	
2016	Falcons 2–0	Falcons; 38–32	Falcons; 45–32	Falcons; 51–45	Falcons lose Super Bowl LI.
2017	Tie 1–1	Falcons; 20–17	Saints; 23–13	Falcons; 52–46	Falcons open Mercedes-Benz Stadium. Saints clinch a playoff berth with their win.
2018	Saints 2–0	Saints; 43–37 (OT)	Saints; 31–17	Falcons; 52–48	Game in New Orleans was played on Thanksgiving.
2019	Tie 1–1	Saints; 26–18	Falcons; 26–9	Falcons; 53–49	Game in Atlanta was played on Thanksgiving. Saints clinched the NFC South with their win. Last start in the series for Saints' QB Drew Brees, as he would miss both 2020 matchups with a rib injury and retire afterward.

2020s (Saints, 7–6)

Season	Season series	at Atlanta Falcons	at New Orleans Saints	Overall series	Notes
2020	Saints 2–0	Saints; 21–16	Saints; 24–9	Falcons; 53–51	Saints' QB Drew Brees missed both meetings due to a rib injury and retired after the season.
2021	Tie 1–1	Saints; 30–20	Falcons; 27–25	Falcons; 54–52	The game in Atlanta was Falcons' QB Matt Ryan's final game with the Falcons and Saints' HC Sean Payton's final game with the Saints.
2022	Saints 2–0	Saints; 27–26	Saints; 21–18	Tie; 54–54	In Atlanta, Saints overcame a 26–10 fourth-quarter deficit.
2023	Tie 1–1	Falcons; 24–15	Saints; 48–17	Tie; 55–55	In New Orleans, the Saints score their most points in a game against the Falcons.
2024	Tie 1–1	Falcons; 26–24	Saints; 20–17	Tie; 56–56	
2025	Falcons 2–0	Falcons; 19–17	Falcons; 24–10	Falcons; 58–56	
2026	Falcons 1–0	January 3	Falcons; 45–24	Falcons; 59–56	

Summary of Results

Season	Season series	at Atlanta Falcons	at New Orleans Saints	Notes
Regular season	Falcons 58–56	Falcons 30–27	Saints 29–28	Falcons are 1–0 in Alamodome, San Antonio (2005), accounted for as a New Orleans Saints home game.
Postseason	Falcons 1–0	no games	Falcons 1–0	NFC Wild Card: 1991
Regular and postseason	Falcons 59–56	Falcons 30–27	Tie 29–29	

== See also ==
- National Football League rivalries
- NFC South
