= Gleason (2016 film) =

American documentary film

- Directed by: Clay Tweel
- Produced by: Kimi Culp; Scott Fujita; Seth Gordon; Mary Rohlich; Kevin Lake
- Starring: Steve Gleason
- Cinematography: Sean Pamphilon; Ty Minton-Small; David Lee
- Edited by: Clay Tweel; Brian Palmer
- Music by: Saul Simon MacWilliams; Dan Romer
- Production companies: Dear Rivers Productions; Exhibit A; IMG Films
- Distributed by: Amazon Studios; Open Road Films
- Release dates: January 23, 2016 (Sundance); July 29, 2016 (US)
- Running time: 111 minutes
- Country: United States
- Language: English
- Box office: $583,664

Gleason is an American documentary film which premiered at the 2016 Sundance Film Festival. It covers five years in the life of the former New Orleans Saints football defensive back Steve Gleason, who has Amyotrophic lateral sclerosis (ALS), sometimes known as Lou Gehrig's disease, a rare incurable neurodegenerative condition associated with the former New York Yankees baseball star Lou Gehrig, who died from the disease in 1941.

== Background ==
Steve Gleason, who was a defensive back for the New Orleans Saints, is best known for his 2006 block of the opposing team's punt in a game on September 25 against the Atlanta Falcons broadcast on Monday Night Football, which, according to Robert Mays writing for the Ringer, was "...the play that sparked a magical season, inspired a statue, and revived a franchise ..." That game was the first time the Saints had played in their home stadium, the Superdome (now the Caesars Superdome) since before Hurricane Katrina. In the aftermath of the hurricane, much of New Orleans was left flooded and devastated, including the Superdome, which had incurred major damage. The team spent the whole season following the hurricane (2005) and the beginning of the 2006 season (over a year), on the road, even for designated home games, which were held in other venues outside of New Orleans, such as in San Antonio. The team had experienced a dismal 2005 season, which led to the post-season firing of head coach Jim Haslett and hiring of Sean Payton. The game was hosted by Monday Night Football primarily to mark the "welcoming home" ceremony for the previously displaced team, and the event was accompanied by a pre-game and halftime ceremonies featuring rock group Green Day who appeared together with Bono and the Edge of U2 to do a version of "The Saints Are Coming".

In 2011, Steve Gleason was diagnosed with Amyotrophic lateral sclerosis (ALS), often referred to as Lou Gehrig's Disease—a rare and incurable neurodegenerative disease that slowly robs the person afflicted of his or her motor functions, including eventually breathing—ultimately resulting in death.

== Production ==
Gleason and filmmaker Sean Pamphilon, who had directed Run Ricky Run, an ESPN profile of former Saints and Dolphins running back Ricky Williams, agreed to collaborate on a documentary profiling Gleason and his experiences with the illness. Shortly thereafter Gleason found out that his wife, Michel Rae Varisco, was pregnant with their son, Rivers, and she and their son factor heavily in the documentary as it depicts the life of their family and the role of his disease in shaping it. Pamphilon, who was biding time between New Orleans and his home in Seattle, followed the family around with a hand-held camera, and eventually, due to the logistical difficulty of proving adequate coverage, brought in Ty Minton-Small, a recent college graduate, as a second cameraman to help capture footage. Minton-Small and the Gleason family developed a strong rapport, with the Gleasons allowing Minton-Small to film the birth of their son, Rivers.

During production, the unit found themselves in the center of a controversy concerning former Saints defensive coordinator Gregg Williams, who was accused of offering players bounties as a reward for injuring players on opposing teams during games. Pamphilon recorded a team meeting in which Williams urged players to "kill the fucking head." Pamphilon, who became concerned about traumatic brain injuries in football, decided that the audio should be made public. In April 2012, a month after the NFL made the situation involving Williams and his staff public, Pamphilon released excerpts from the meeting without Gleason's permission, effectively ending their relationship and his role in the project. Ty Minton-Small and David Lee, who had been hired as Pamphilon's assistants earlier that year continued to follow the family for the remainder of the shooting. According to Gleason, the crew and his family became very close:

Ty and David more or less lived and traveled with us," Gleason wrote Gambit in an email interview "They did caretaking for me, and are like uncles to Rivers. ... Ultimately, they weren't outside filmmakers filming our family. We were a team, working together on a mutual project. Ty and David are family to us.

The film chronicles the progressive stages in Gleason's disease. As his disease advanced, Gleason lost control of most motor functions, including speaking, and he now relies on assistive technology, known as Augmentive/Alternative Communication (AAC), to communicate. Steve Gleason is a fan of rock group Pearl Jam and is friends with several members of the band, including Mike McCready, who wrote a song called "Hoping and Healing" that was included in the film.

== Release ==
The film had its world premiere at the 2016 Sundance Film Festival on January 23, 2016. Shortly after, Amazon Studios acquired distribution rights to the film. Open Road Films is co-distributing the film with Amazon. The film was released in the United States on July 29, 2016.

=== Critical reception ===
On review aggregator website Rotten Tomatoes, the film holds an approval rating of 96% based on 70 reviews, and an average rating of 8/10. The website's critical consensus reads, "Gleason stands out among sports-themed documentaries by offering a clear-eyed look at its subject's physical deterioration — and an intimate portrait of the family affected by his ordeal." On Metacritic, the film has a weighted average score of 80 out of 100, based on 29 critics, indicating "generally favorable" reviews.

== See also ==
- List of American football films
