= Rebirth =

Rebirth may refer to:

== Arts, entertainment, and media ==
=== Film ===
- Rebirth (2011 film), a 2011 Japanese drama film
- Rebirth (2016 film), a 2016 American thriller film
- Rebirth, a 2011 documentary film produced by Project Rebirth
- The Rebirth (film), a 2007 Japanese film directed by Masahiro Kobayashi
- Mortal Kombat: Rebirth, a 2010 short film
- Jurassic World Rebirth, a 2025 American science fiction film

=== Music ===
==== Bands and groups ====
- Rebirth Brass Band, a New Orleans brass band
- The Rebirth (band), a Los Angeles soul band
- Rebirth, a record label which The March Violets have recorded under

==== Albums and EPs ====
- Rebirth (Aka Moon album), 1994
- Rebirth (Angra album), 2001
- Rebirth (Billy Childs album), 2017
- Rebirth (Gackt album), 2001
- Rebirth (Jennifer Lopez album), 2005
- Rebirth (Jimmy Cliff album), 2012
- Rebirth (Keith Sweat album), 2002
- Rebirth (Lil Wayne album), 2010
- Rebirth (Masami Okui album), 2004
- Rebirth (Pain album), 1999
- ReBirth (album), a 2020 album by Young Stunners
- The Rebirth, a 2009 album by Bobby V
- The Rebirth (Eric Bellinger album), 2014
- Rebirth (EP), a 2009 EP by SS501
- R.ebirth, a 2016 mixtape by Ravi
- Re:birth, a 2007 tribute album to Luna Sea

==== Songs ====
- "Rebirth", a song by All Shall Perish on the album This Is Where It Ends, 2011
- "Rebirth", a song by Bone Thugs-n-Harmony on the album Uni5: The World's Enemy, 2010
- "Rebirth", a song by Born of Osiris on the album A Higher Place, 2009
- "Rebirth", a song by Caroline Rose on the album The Art of Forgetting, 2023
- "Rebirth", a song by Erra on the album Augment, 2013
- "Rebirth", a song by Fairyland on the album Of Wars in Osyrhia, 2003
- "Rebirth", a song by Galneryus on the album Beyond the End of Despair..., 2006
- "Rebirth", a song by Gorgoroth on the album Quantos Possunt ad Satanitatem Trahunt, 2009
- "Rebirth", a song by In Hearts Wake on the album Earthwalker, 2014
- "Rebirth", a song by Ithilien on the album From Ashes to the Frozen Land, 2013
- "Rebirth", a song by Mors Principium Est on the album Seven, 2020
- "Rebirth", a song by Orbit Culture on the album Nija, 2020
- "Rebirth", a song by Thunderstone on the album Dirt Metal, 2009
- "Rebirth", a 2011 song by Ran-D

=== Publications ===
- Rebirth (manhwa), a manhwa series by Lee Kang-woo
- Rebirth (newspaper), a short-lived hippie underground newspaper in Phoenix, Arizona
- DC Rebirth, a 2016 relaunch of DC Comics monthly ongoing series
- Green Lantern: Rebirth, a comic book series
- The Flash: Rebirth, a comic book series
- The Chrysalids, titled in the United States as Re-Birth, a 1955 novel by John Wyndham

=== Television ===
- "Rebirth" (Batman Beyond), 1999 television episodes
- "Rebirth" (Batwoman), a 2021 television episode
- "Rebirth" (Death Note), a 2006 television episode
- "Rebirth" (Futurama), a 2010 television episode
- "Rebirth" (Supergirl), a 2021 television episode
- "Rebirth" (The 4400), a 2005 television episode
- "Rebirth" (The Legend of Korra), a 2014 television episode
- The Transformers: The Rebirth, a television season
- Rebirth, an anime television series by Liden Films

=== Video games ===
- .hack//G.U. Volume 1: Rebirth, a 2006 video game
- Tales of Rebirth, a 2004 video game
- Amnesia: Rebirth, a 2020 video game
- Final Fantasy VII: Rebirth, a 2024 video game
- ReBirth, a title appended to video game titles to indicate a sequel or remake, such as:
  - Gradius ReBirth, a 2008 shoot 'em up video game
  - Castlevania: The Adventure ReBirth, a side-scrolling action platform game developed by M2
  - Contra ReBirth, a 2009 2D run and gun video game
  - Hyperdimension Neptunia Re;Birth 1
  - The Binding of Isaac: Rebirth, an independent roguelike video game

== Religion ==
- Regeneration (theology), a concept in Christian theology
  - Born again, a Christian term referring to a spiritually reborn person
- Reincarnation, the transmigration of a deceased person's spirit/soul, essence and consciousness into another body and other name
  - Rebirth (Buddhism), the teaching that the actions of a sentient being lead to a new existence after death
- Resurrection, the concept of coming back to life after death
  - Universal resurrection, a term referring to an event by which people are resurrected

== Other uses ==
- Rebirth (sculpture), a proposed outdoor sculpture by American artist Seyed Alavi
- ReBirth RB-338, a software synthesizer
- 2006 Atlanta Falcons–New Orleans Saints game, a game nicknamed "Rebirth" by New Orleans Saints fans.

== See also ==
- Born Again (disambiguation)
- New Birth (disambiguation)
- Palingenesis
- Past life (disambiguation)
- Past Lives (disambiguation)
- Rebirthing (disambiguation)
- Reborn (disambiguation)
- Reincarnation (disambiguation)
- Renaissance, the cultural phenomenon which literally translates as "rebirth" in French
