= Reborn =

Reborn may refer to:

== Film ==
- Reborn (1981 film), a Spanish thriller film
- Reborn, a 2015 video produced by the Augustine Institute
- Re:Born (film), a 2016 Japanese action film
- Reborn (2018 film), an American horror film

== Music ==
- Reborn (band), a Moroccan death metal band

=== Albums ===
- Reborn (Avalon album) or the title song, 2009
- Reborn (Diaura album) or the title song, 2013
- Reborn (Era album) or the title song, 2008
- Reborn (Finding Favour album) or the title song, 2015
- Reborn (Denny Laine album) or the title song, 1996
- Reborn (Kavinsky album), by Kavinsky, 2022
- Reborn (Living Sacrifice album), 1997
- Reborn (Manafest album) or the title song, 2015
- Reborn (Nate Sib album), 2026
- Reborn (Northern Kings album), 2007
- Reborn (Stryper album) or the title song, 2005
- Reborn (Trapt album), 2013
- Re:Born (album), by Gackt, 2009
- Re:Born (EP), by Soyou, 2017
- Reborn, by Infected Mushroom, 2024

=== Songs ===
- "Reborn" (song), by Kids See Ghosts, 2018
- "Reborn", by AKB48 from Kibōteki Refrain, 2014
- "Reborn", by As Blood Runs Black from Instinct, 2011
- "Reborn", by Biohazard from Reborn in Defiance, 2012
- "Reborn", by Damageplan from New Found Power, 2004
- "Reborn", by the Living End from State of Emergency, 2006
- "Reborn", by Rae Morris from Someone Out There, 2018
- "Reborn", by Rebecca St. James song from Transform, 2000
- "Reborn", by Scar Symmetry from Symmetric in Design, 2005
- "Reborn", by Slayer from Reign in Blood, 1986

== Fiction ==
=== Literature ===
- Reborn!, a Japanese manga, anime, and media franchise
- Reborn (novel), a 1990 Adversary Cycle novel by F. Paul Wilson

=== Characters ===
- Reborn (Arcobaleno), a fictional character in the manga and anime franchise Reborn!
- Reborn, a group of fictional characters in the video game Star Wars Jedi Knight II: Jedi Outcast

== Other uses ==
- Reborn doll, a type of art doll modified to resemble a living infant
- "Reborn", the first episode of the TV series Servant

== See also ==
- Born again (disambiguation)
- Rebirth (disambiguation)
- Reincarnation
- Resurrection
- Second Coming
