= Born Again =

Born Again may refer to:

== Religion ==
- Arhat, also or arahant, the Buddhist conception which succeeds the earlier Dvija concept in the Dharmic tradition
- Born again, a Christian term for spiritual rebirth and salvation
- Dvija, the concept of being "twice-born" prominent in Hinduism

== Film and television ==
- Born Again (film), a 1978 American film
- Born Again (TV series), a 2020 South Korean television series
- Daredevil: Born Again, a superhero television series set in the Marvel Cinematic Universe

=== Episodes ===
- "Born Again" (The Americans)
- "Born Again" (Doctor Who)
- "Born Again" (Doctors)
- "Born Again" (Vikings)
- "Born Again" (Wentworth)
- "Born Again" (The X-Files)

== Literature ==
- "Born Again" (comics), a 1986 Daredevil story arc
- Born Again, a 1976 book by Charles Colson
- "Born Again", a 2005 short story by K. D. Wentworth

== Music ==
=== Albums ===
- Born Again (Black Sabbath album), 1983
- Born Again (Mica Paris album), 2009
- Born Again (Newsboys album), 2010
- Born Again (The Notorious B.I.G. album), 1999
- Born Again (Randy Newman album), 1979
- Born Again (Red Flag album), 2007
- Born Again (Warrant album), 2006
- Born Again (Wumpscut album), 1998
- Born Again, by Blood Axis, 2011
- Born Again, by Farmer Boys, 2018
- Born Again, by Pat Boone, 1973

=== Songs ===
- "Born Again" (Lisa song), featuring Doja Cat and Raye, 2025
- "Born Again" (SHY & DRS song), 2014
- "Born Again" (Starsailor song), 2003
- "Born Again" (Third Day song), 2009
- "Born Again" (Tiffany Young song), 2019
- "Born Again", by Austin French from the album Wide Open, 2018
- "Born Again", by Badly Drawn Boy from Have You Fed the Fish?
- "Born Again", by Beast in Black from Berserker, 2017
- "Born Again", by Bebe Rexha from Bebe, 2023
- "Born Again", by Black Veil Brides from The Phantom Tomorrow, 2021
- "Born Again", by Blood Axis from the album Born Again, 2011
- "Born Again", by The Christians from The Christians
- "Born Again", by Cory Asbury from Reckless Love
- "Born Again", by Fast Boy and ClockClock, 2025
- "Born Again", by Kodaline from Politics of Living
- "Born Again", by Marilyn Manson from Holy Wood (In the Shadow of the Valley of Death)
- "Born Again", by Newsboys from their 2010 album of the same name (see above)
- "Born Again", by Primal Fear from Unbreakable
- "Born Again", by Rihanna from Black Panther: Wakanda Forever – Music from and Inspired By
- "Born Again", by Saint Motel from Saintmotelevision
- "Born Again", by Supergrass from Supergrass

== See also ==
- Born Again Movement
- Born Again Pagans, a 1994 album by Coil Vs. ELpH
- Born-again virgin
- Björn Again, an ABBA tribute band
- Bourne-again shell or bash, a Unix-like shell
- Renaissance
- Rebirth (disambiguation)
- Reborn (disambiguation)
