= Reincarnated =

Something reincarnated is the subject of reincarnation.

Reincarnated may also refer to:

- Reincarnated (TV series), a Hong-Kong TV series
- Reincarnated (album), a 2013 album by Snoop Dogg
- Reincarnated (film), a documentary film featuring Snoop Dogg
- "Reincarnated" (song), a song by Kendrick Lamar
- "Reincarnated", a song by X Ambassadors from their 2021 album The Beautiful Liar

== See also ==
- Reincarnation (disambiguation)
