= Reincarnation (disambiguation) =

Reincarnation is the concept that the soul, after biological death, begins a new life in a new body.

Reincarnation and variants may also refer to:

- Rebirth (Buddhism)
- Tulku, in Tibetan Buddhism

== Music ==
- Reincarnation (band), an Armenian reggae band

=== Albums ===
- Reincarnation (Exuma album), 1972
- Reincarnation (Galneryus album), 2008
- Reincarnation (William C. Woxlin album), 2006
- Reincarnation (Yumi Matsutoya album), 1983
- Reincarnation, or the title song, by VIXX, 2018
- Reincarnate (album), by Motionless in White, 2014

=== Songs ===
- "Reincarnation" (Ami Suzuki song), 2009
- "Reincarnation", by Artch from Another Return
- "Reincarnation", by Band-Maid from Conqueror
- "Reincarnation", by Booker T. & the MGs from Universal Language
- "Reincarnation", by The Equals from Baby, Come Back
- "Reincarnation", by John McLaughlin from Adventures in Radioland
- "Reincarnation", by Roger Miller from The Return of Roger Miller
- "Reincarnation", by Sodom from Tapping The Vein

== Other media ==
- Reincarnation (film), a 2005 Japanese horror film
- Reincarnation (novel), a 2008 fantasy novel by Suzanne Weyn
- "Reincarnation" (Futurama), a television episode
- Reincarnate, a tentatively titled sequel to the M. Night Shyamalan film Devil

== See also ==
- Reencarnación, a song by Thalía
- Reincarnated (disambiguation)
- Past life (disambiguation)
- Past lives (disambiguation)
- Rebirth (disambiguation)
