= Rebirthing =

Rebirthing may refer to:

- Attachment therapy (also called rebirthing), a pseudoscientific child mental health intervention
- "Rebirthing" (song), a song by the Christian rock band Skillet
- Rebirthing, a breathwork process described as releasing suppressed traumatic childhood memories

== See also ==
- Rebirth (disambiguation)
