= Past Lives =

Past lives is a reference to reincarnation.

Past Lives may also refer to:

== Music ==
- Past Lives (band), an American post-punk band

=== Albums ===
- Past Lives – The Best of the RCA Years, a compilation by the British musical group Level 42, 2007
- Past Lives (Saccharine Trust album), 1989
- Past Lives (Black Sabbath album), 2002
- Past Lives (Against the Current album), 2018
- Past Lives (L.S. Dunes album), 2022

=== Songs ===
- "Past Lives" (Kesha song), 2012
- "Past Lives" (Børns song), 2014
- "Past Lives" (Local Natives song), 2016

== Other uses ==
- Past Lives (comics), a comic book storyline based on the Buffy the Vampire Slayer television series
- Past Lives (film), 2023 film directed by Celine Song

== See also ==
- Past life (disambiguation)
- Past life regression
- Reincarnation (disambiguation)
- Rebirth (disambiguation)
