= Past life =

Past life, a concept found within reincarnation, may refer to:

== Film and television ==
- Past Life (film), a 2016 Israeli film by Avi Nesher
- Past Life (TV series), a 2010 American crime drama series
- "Past Life" (Agents of S.H.I.E.L.D.), a 2018 episode
- "Past Life" (Runaways), a 2018 episode

== Songs ==
- "Past Life" (Trevor Daniel song), 2020
- "Past Life", by Ariana Grande from Eternal Sunshine Deluxe: Brighter Days Ahead, 2025
- "Past Life", by Arkells, 2022
- "Past Life", by Maggie Rogers from Heard It in a Past Life, 2019
- "Past Life", by Tame Impala from Currents, 2015
- "Past Life", by Kid Cudi from Free, 2025

== See also ==
- Past Lives (disambiguation)
- Past life regression
- Rebirth (disambiguation)
- Reincarnation (disambiguation)
