= Sean Pamphilon =

American film director

Sean Pamphilon is an American sports television producer turned documentary filmmaker. He produced multiple television features on National Football League player Ricky Williams for Fox Sports and ESPN, and he later directed the Williams documentary, Run Ricky Run, for ESPN's award-winning documentary series 30 for 30 with film partner Royce Toni.

In April 2012, he released audio recordings of a pre-game team meeting related to the New Orleans Saints bounty scandal of former New Orleans Saints coach Gregg Williams instructing his players to inflict physical harm on their opponents and announcing bounties on offensive players before the team faced the 49ers in a 2012 NFC divisional round game the next day. Pamphilon had access to the Saints locker room while collaborating with former Saints player Steve Gleason on a documentary. Gleason said he and his family retain the rights to the recordings, and Pamphilon released them without permission. Pamphilon said he would not have released the recordings if the story regarding the bounties was not already public. He denied that their contract prohibited posting of the footage and said that he and Gleason had agreed to a third-party mediator, who advised publicly releasing the recordings. "I feel as strongly today as I have from the beginning that the audio speaks for itself and that the public had a right to hear it," Pamphilon said.
