= 2006 Atlanta Falcons–New Orleans Saints game =

American football game

"Rebirth"
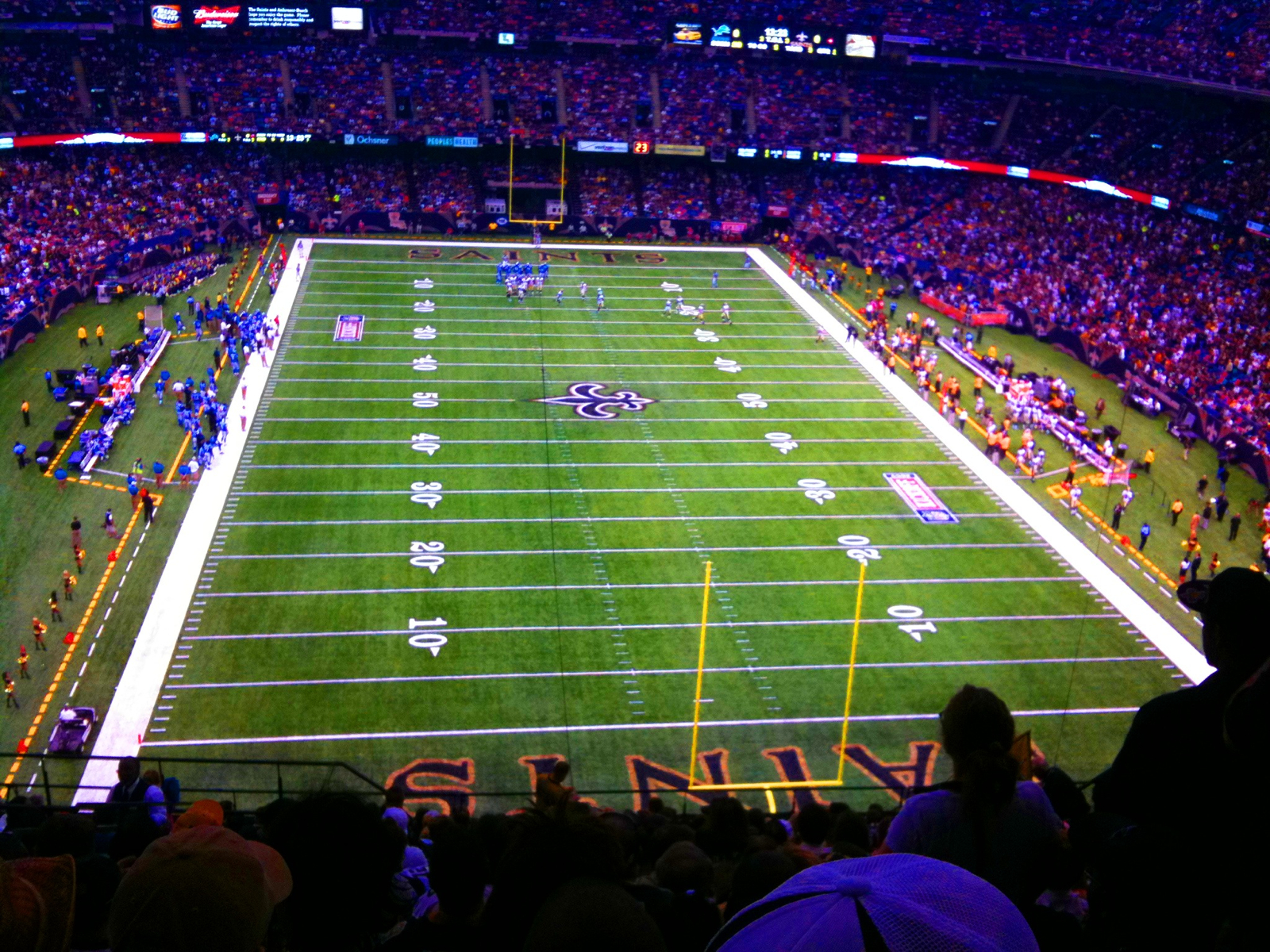
- The Louisiana Superdome (pictured in 2009), where the game was played
Atlanta Falcons (2–0)	New Orleans Saints (2–0)
3	23
Head coach: Jim Mora	Head coach: Sean Payton
	1	2	3	4	Total
ATL	3	0	0	0	3
NO	14	6	3	0	23
- Date: September 25, 2006
- Stadium: Louisiana Superdome; New Orleans, Louisiana
- Favorite: Falcons by 4
- Referee: Ed Hochuli
- Attendance: 70,003

Ceremonies
- National anthem: Irma Thomas, Allen Toussaint, Kermit Ruffins
- Coin toss: George H. W. Bush
- Halftime show: Human Jukebox

TV in the United States
- Network: ESPN
- Announcers: Mike Tirico, Joe Theismann, Tony Kornheiser, Suzy Kolber, and Michele Tafoya
- Nielsen ratings: 11.8; U.S. viewership: 14.9 million

The Atlanta Falcons and New Orleans Saints played a National Football League (NFL) regular season game on September 25, 2006, at the Louisiana Superdome in New Orleans, Louisiana. Part of the Falcons–Saints rivalry, the game took place in Week 3 of the 2006 NFL season.

The game was the first at the Superdome since 2004, after which the stadium was severely damaged by Hurricane Katrina. In a win regarded as symbolic of the city's recovery following the disaster, the Saints defeated the Falcons 23–3. The first touchdown of the game came on the first series when Saints safety Steve Gleason blocked Michael Koenen's punt, which was recovered by cornerback Curtis Deloatch in the end zone.

Due to the emotional circumstances and how it revitalized New Orleans, it is nicknamed the "Rebirth" game and "Domecoming". A statue of the blocked punt is on display outside the Superdome.

== Background ==
The Louisiana Superdome opened in 1975 as a multi-purpose stadium for a variety of tenants, chiefly the Saints.

In late August 2005, Hurricane Katrina struck the New Orleans area. It was one of the strongest and most destructive hurricanes in American history, resulting in 1,392 fatalities with the majority in the state of Louisiana. Approximately 100,000 people were trapped in the city due to a failed evacuation. The Superdome was designated as a "shelter of last resort", but the venue became overcrowded with evacuees. Once Katrina made landfall, the stadium sustained severe damage as 70% of the roof failed, while the air conditioning, water supply, and emergency generators were disabled. Severe flooding led to 3.8 million gallons of water having to be pumped out along with 4,000 tons of trash from sewage.

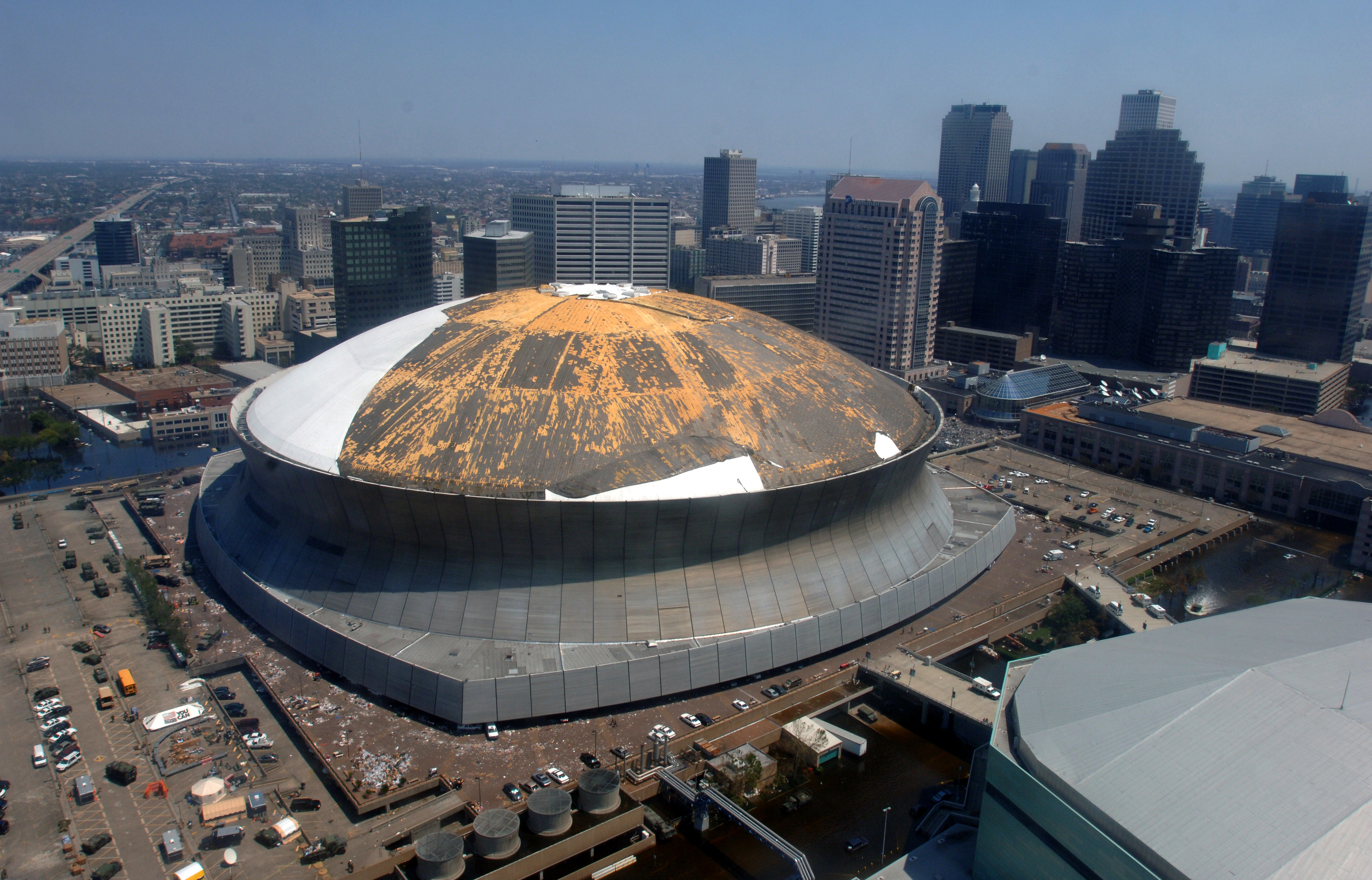
Damage to the Superdome in September 2005

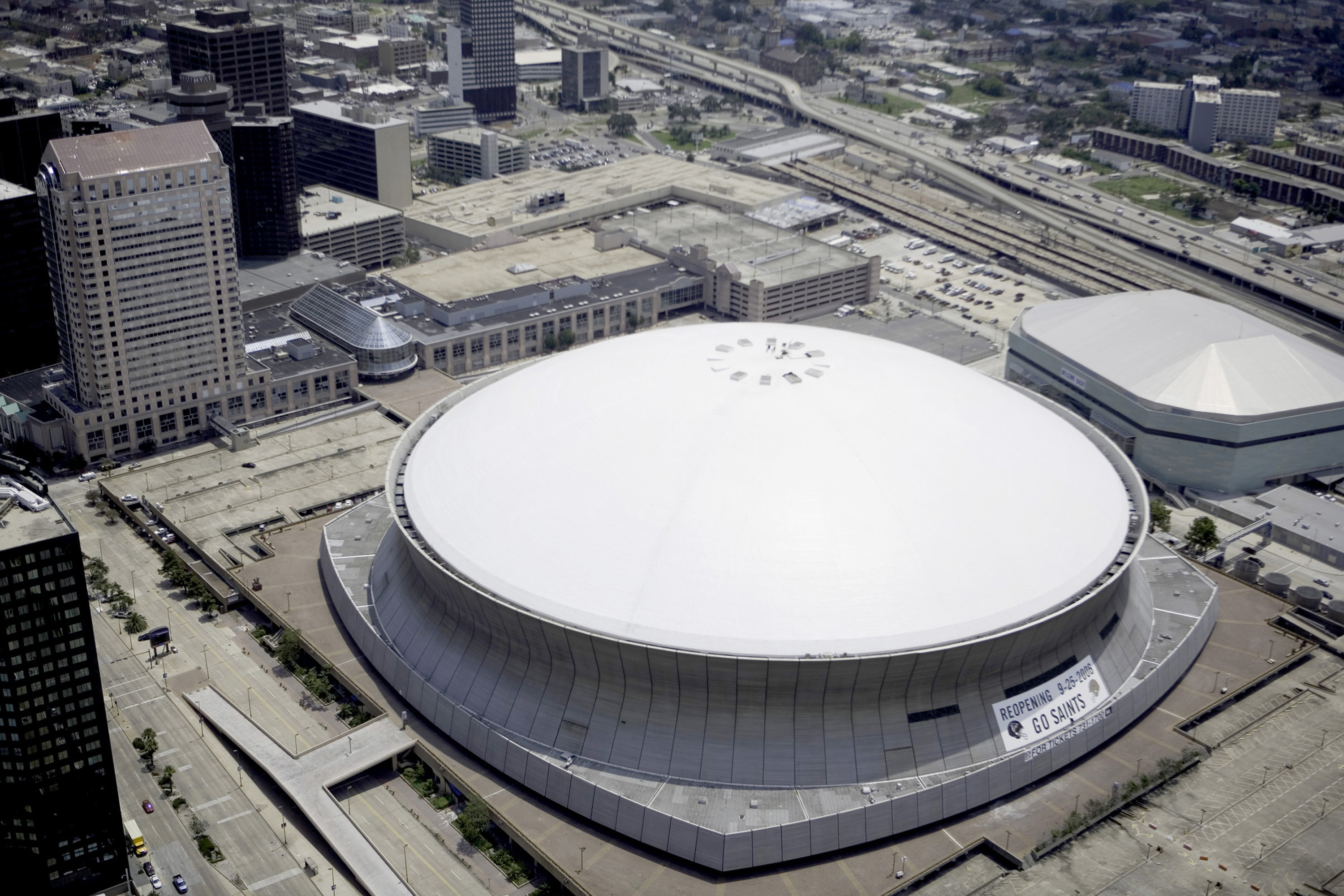
The Superdome in August 2006 after repairs

Living conditions, including poor sanitation and a lack of resources, deteriorated over the next two days. Three people also died in the stadium. Those staying at the Superdome were subsequently relocated elsewhere by the end of the month.

The final Saints regular season game played at the Superdome prior to the hurricane was a 26–13 win over the Falcons on December 26, 2004. Their last regardless of season implication was in the 2005 preseason on August 26, less than three days before Katrina made landfall, when they lost 21–6 to the Baltimore Ravens. Due to the damage, they were forced to play their 2005 campaign at the Alamodome in San Antonio, the New York Giants and Jets' Giants Stadium, and LSU's Tiger Stadium in Baton Rouge. In a season plagued by poor performance and frequent traveling, both of which contributed to poor morale, the Saints finished 3–13.

Throughout the 2005 season, reports suggested the Saints could permanently move to San Antonio in the wake of the disaster. Saints owner Tom Benson publicly refuted the claims, though speculation persisted since he was from San Antonio, had fired executive vice president Arnie Fielkow who opposed relocation, and long pushed for the state to build a replacement for the aging Superdome. San Antonio mayor Phil Hardberger also opined they would have relocated "had there never been a hurricane." New Orleans mayor Ray Nagin described the situation as disrespectful to the city and its fans. In private, NFL commissioner Paul Tagliabue negotiated with the Saints to keep them in Louisiana. Louisiana governor Kathleen Blanco signed an executive order in December 2005 that expedited the Superdome's repairs; Blanco recalled Tagliabue had told her, "If you can get that dome up for the first regular game of the 2006 season, next year's season, I will work with Tom Benson. Together we will make sure that the Saints will be there.'" Benson issued a memorandum to Saints staffers on December 30 confirming a return to New Orleans for the 2006 season.

An assessment of the hurricane's impact on the Superdome found its mechanical and electrical systems were still mostly in good shape, while the interior had to be replaced. The turf, scoreboard, and seats were changed out, while the temporary roof installed following Katrina and the underlying steel decking were replaced with a new roof and support structure that contractors assured was "guaranteed never to blow off." $184 million was procured to oversee the repair with $13 million from the state of Louisiana, $115 million from Federal Emergency Management Agency (FEMA), $41 million in bonds raised by the Louisiana Stadium & Expedition District, and a $15 million grant donated by the NFL. The governor received criticism for investing into fixing the stadium over crucial infrastructure, though the money was strictly intended for the Superdome.

Repairs were completed in less than 13 months. Blanco stated upon its reopening, "We know that the Superdome was symbolic of a lot of misery. It's now a symbol of our recovery. It stands as a symbol of all of our experiences over the past year."

== 2006 season ==
Both teams entered Week 3 with undefeated records after winning their first two games. The Saints defeated the Cleveland Browns 19–14 in their season opener followed by a 34–27 win over the Green Bay Packers. The Falcons began their 2006 campaign by playing all three of their NFC South rivals, beating the "Super Bowl favorite" Carolina Panthers 20–6 and the defending division champion Tampa Bay Buccaneers 14–3.

2006 was the first season for New Orleans head coach Sean Payton and quarterback Drew Brees. Payton came over from the Dallas Cowboys while Brees signed with the Saints as a free agent from the San Diego Chargers. Brees had been coming off surgery to fix a serious shoulder injury, and the uncertainty surrounding if his arm could recover led to hesitation from teams looking for a quarterback. Given the team's struggles and the city's post-Katrina recovery, few players were interested in joining the Saints. Linebacker Scott Fujita, who followed Payton to New Orleans, recalled team headquarters was still being used by FEMA just three weeks before his free agency visit and that "people thought we were nuts."

Brees was modest in his Saints debut, throwing a touchdown and an interception. He also committed three turnovers against the Packers, but rebounded with two touchdowns in the win. The Saints offense also featured running back Deuce McAllister, who returned from a knee injury that forced him to miss the final 11 games of 2005, and rookie Reggie Bush; a former Heisman Trophy winner who recorded 141 yards in the season opener, Bush was regarded by the Associated Press as having "given the city's football fans renewed optimism in the wake of Hurricane Katrina's devastation."

The Falcons featured one of the best rushing offenses in the league, led by quarterback Michael Vick and running backs Warrick Dunn and Jerious Norwood. The offense rushed for 252 yards against the Panthers and a franchise-record 306 yards versus the Bucs; the 558 combined rushing yards were the third most by a team after two games in league history. Dunn also led the league in rushing yards with 266. Although his 2005 season was hampered by knee injury, Vick was still considered an exciting dual-threat quarterback going into 2006: against Tampa Bay, he set an NFL record for the most 100-yard rushing games by a quarterback with his sixth. By the end of 2006, Vick would be the first quarterback in league history to rush for 1,000 yards in a season. Dunn also ran for 1,140 yards, making the 2006 Falcons the fourth team to have multiple thousand-yard rushers.

Entering Week 3, the Falcons led the all-time series against the Saints: they defeated their rival 42 times in the regular season against 30 defeats, and also won in the 1991–92 NFL playoffs. The Falcons swept the meetings in 2005, winning 34–31 at the Saints' "home" game in the Alamodome and 36–17 on Monday Night Football in Atlanta.

== Festivities ==
To celebrate the Superdome's reopening, special guests and festivities were arranged. Tourism into the city rose as fans came to attend the game, leading to hotel occupancy for the weekend being in the "high 80 percent range". Tickets went for as much as USD$2,000. Brian McCarthy, the NFL's director of communications, called it "certainly a lot bigger than the normal Week 3 Monday night game. In terms of production, scope, and interest, it resembles a Super Bowl production a lot." Saints fullback Mike Karney was approached by teammate Ernie Conwell, who played in two Super Bowls and told him, "'You wanna know what it's like to play in a Super Bowl? Look around. This is what it's like.'"

Hours before the game, the Goo Goo Dolls held a free concert on the Superdome's ramps, which were used as a helipad for rescue helicopters during the hurricane. A "Super Bowl-like pregame show" took place prior to kickoff as music groups Green Day and U2 performed. The bands performed a cover of the Skids song "The Saints Are Coming". The NFL had approached U2's guitarist Edge and producer Bob Ezrin, who created the foundation Music Rising to assist musicians impacted by Katrina, about performing. The former then reached out to Green Day frontman Billie Joe Armstrong to play alongside U2. The Edge selected "The Saints Are Coming" for the show since it was his favorite song as a teenager and the participating bands had punk rock roots.

New Orleans musical stars Irma Thomas and Allen Toussaint sang "The Star-Spangled Banner" with accompanying trumpet by Kermit Ruffins. It was the first time Thomas performed the anthem with accompaniment as she usually prefers to sing it a cappella. The Human Jukebox, the marching band of Southern University, played the halftime show.

Former president George H. W. Bush did the coin toss. Bush won the Republican Party's nomination for the 1988 United States presidential election at the Superdome, which hosted that year's Republican National Convention. He was accompanied by 150 Katrina first responders, who were the first to enter the stadium for the game.

Tagliabue and his successor Roger Goodell attended the game. Film director Spike Lee watched from the New Orleans sideline. Blanco described the gameday atmosphere as "electrifying" and quipped "we almost blew the dome's roof off again."

ESPN televised the game while Westwood One provided radio coverage. Pre-game show sponsor Rhapsody also streamed the broadcast online, which was sold for a limited time afterward. Although the Saints usually provided 200 media credentials per game, they granted 550 to ESPN and also fielded requests from non-sports networks like Al Jazeera Media Network, HSN, and The Weather Channel.

== Game ==
=== Start ===
The Falcons won the coin toss and elected to receive the opening kickoff. Allen Rossum returned the kickoff for 24 yards to his team's 29-yard line to begin the drive. After Warrick Dunn ran for a six-yard gain on first down, Vick's pass for Michael Jenkins was incomplete.

On third down and needing four yards for the first down, Vick ran a bootleg play but was sacked by Fujita. Vick fumbled in the process, though the ball was kicked out of bounds. Saints' vice president of communications Greg Bensel often made fun of Fujita for the play because he "would have prevented history from happening" had a Saints player recovered the fumble.

In total, the Falcons' drive lasted just one minute and 18 seconds.

=== Blocked punt ===
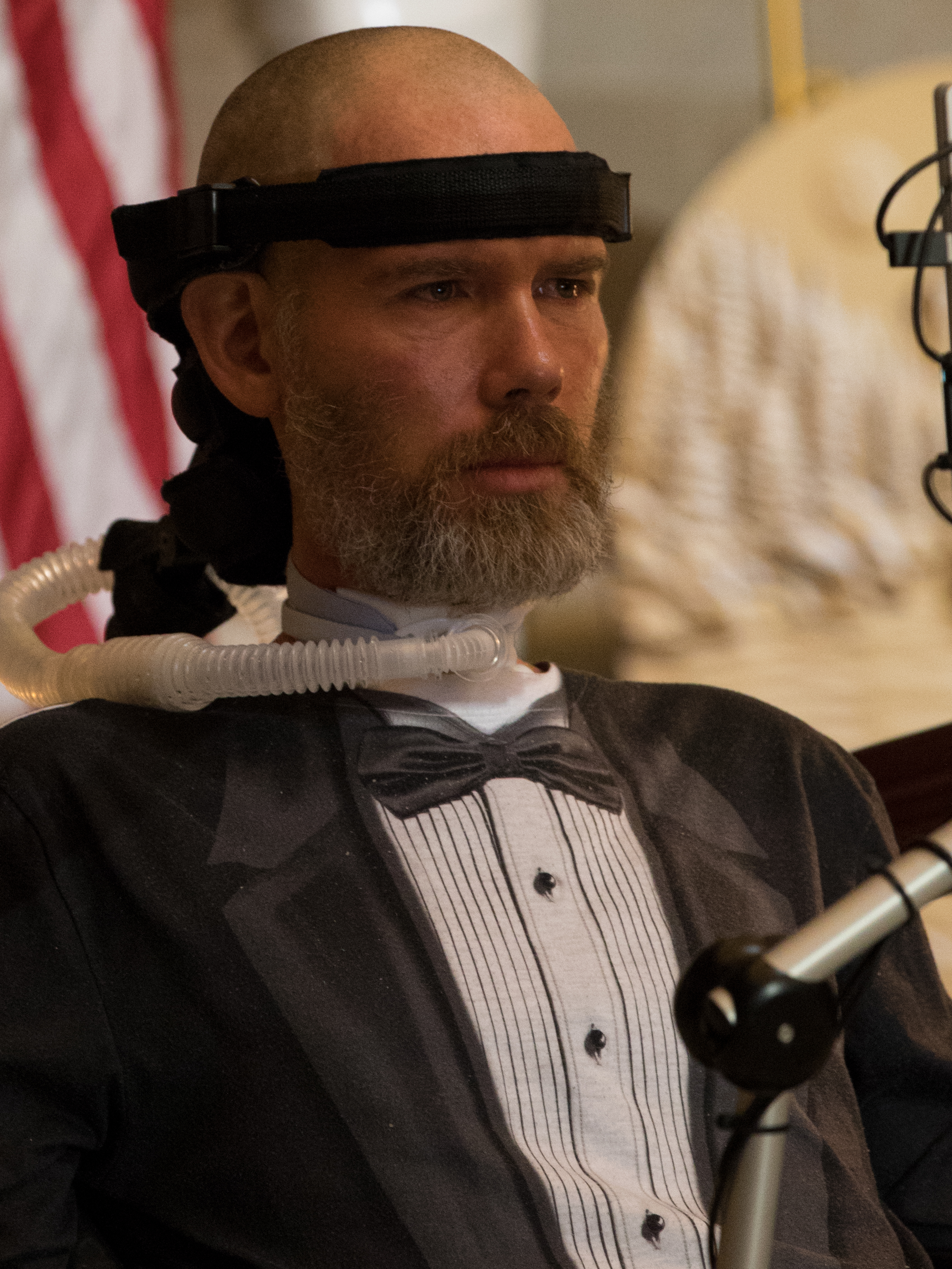
Steve Gleason (pictured in 2020), who blocked the punt

On fourth and 10 from their own 29-yard line, Falcons punter Michael Koenen was summoned to punt in what he called "kind of a regular punt situation, backed up a little bit. Trying to get the ball out of there a little quicker." Only ten Falcons were on the field, an error that prompted Saints special teams coordinator John Bonamego to suggest attempting to block the punt. Deloatch, a backup cornerback who was on the sideline before the play, was sent in by Bonamego to take advantage of the undermanned Falcons.

The Saints' punt return team lined up with eight players on the line of scrimmage to rush Koenen, four on each side of long snapper Boone Stutz, while Steve Gleason and Aaron Stecker were tasked with targeting Stutz and the upback. While studying the Falcons' punt unit at the start of the season, Bonamego noticed their long snapper and upback blocked in opposite directions, which gave away their assigned block depending on where the latter stood at the start of the play: when the upback lined up on the right side of the field, it suggested the long snapper would block leftward and vice versa. Gleason and Stecker were to charge at this hole, with one taking on the snapper while the other would use the opening to go for the punter. Assistant special teams coordinator Greg McMahon felt Gleason was the fitting candidate for the role since he knew how to identify openings and move around.

Gleason's assignment was a stunt in which he moved from the right A-gap (between the long snapper and the guard immediately to his side) to the left. After the snap, the Falcons attempted a "bizarre slide scheme" that Gleason had never seen in his career, wherein they blocked a different gap from what was expected. Stutz went to his left and encountered Stecker, while the sliding protection meant the B-gap (between the guard and tackle) was open. Without a blocker to face, Gleason ran through the line untouched.

Koenen received the ball and prepared to punt. He felt his "timing was good" since he took less than two seconds to drop the ball and kick. However, Gleason raised his hands in front of Koenen as the latter kicked, blocking the punt. The live ball bounced backward toward the Falcons' goal line, where Deloatch dived onto it. Deloatch fell into the end zone to score the touchdown, which he celebrated by slam dunking the ball over the goal post. He commented the touchdown felt "like I just gave New Orleans a brand-new city."

The stadium erupted into celebration; Deloatch mentioned in 2016 the realization he had scored did not sink in until he saw the reaction in the stands. Falcons head coach Jim L. Mora recalled it was the loudest stadium he had been in. ESPN's broadcast went silent for 35 seconds as the network focused on the reaction from the stands and field, which play-by-play commentator Mike Tirico explained in 2020 was because "no words from the most revered wordsmith walking the planet could have equaled the message of the cheers of that crowd."

Tirico called the play: "Look out! Right through! Kick blocked by Steve Gleason! It is scooped and scored by Curtis Deloatch! Touchdown, New Orleans!" Emphasis was placed on describing the score as being by the city rather than the team since Tirico wanted to credit New Orleans as a whole. He considered it one of his favorite calls in his career.

The score was also the first touchdown surrendered by the Falcons in 2006.

=== Rest of game ===
After the touchdown, the Saints kicked off again. This time, the Falcons advanced to the opposing seven-yard line, aided by Vick's 48-yard pass to Ashley Lelie, before Morten Andersen made the 26-yard field goal. Despite the big gain, Vick struggled early on as he completed just two of his first 12 passes.

Both teams traded punts after Andersen's kick. On their final drive of the first quarter, the Saints scored a second touchdown with a play nicknamed the "Superdome Special": Brees faked a handoff to McAllister before handing off to Reggie Bush on an end-around; Bush then lateraled to Devery Henderson on the reverse who ran for the 11-yard touchdown.

The next three series of the game ended with punts. Carney converted a 37-yard field goal halfway through the second quarter. With less than two minutes in the first half, Andersen's 25-yard kick was blocked by Saints safety Josh Bullocks. Another Carney field goal, from 51 yards, gave New Orleans a 20–3 lead at halftime.

The second half began with the Saints receiving the kickoff. Brees led the offense as far as Atlanta's one-yard line, where three rushing attempts failed and Carney made a 20-yard kick. It was New Orleans' final score of the game as they punted on every drive afterward. Down by 20, the Falcons began to throw the ball more. Consequently, Dunn went from having ten carries in the first half to just three in the second. They were unable to cross into Saints territory on their next three possessions. Atlanta finally crossed midfield with eight minutes remaining in the game, but the drive ended with a turnover on downs after Vick's fourth-down pass for Jenkins failed. The Falcons' last series came with 2:33 to go. Vick was sacked by Will Smith following the two-minute warning, and the Falcons ran two more plays—both rushing by Justin Griffith for 12 total yards—to end the game.

Brees concluded the game with 20 of 28 passes completed for 191 yards and a passer rating of 90. McAllister led the Saints in rushing with 81 yards ahead of Reggie Bush's 53, while Marques Colston caught seven passes. The Falcons were limited to 117 rushing yards, most of which came on quarterback scrambles by Vick while Dunn had just 44 of them. Vick was also sacked five times and completed only 12 of 31 passes for 137 yards with a rating of 52.8. Fujita recorded eight tackles along with the sack and forced fumble on Vick.

Saints head coach Sean Payton dedicated the game ball to the city of New Orleans, which was accepted by Dallas Mavericks head coach and New Orleans native Avery Johnson. Johnson had spoken with the Saints during training camp, and the team placed a locker for him in the locker room.

The game averaged 14.9 million viewers on ESPN across 10.85 million households for an 11.8 rating. It was the most watched event of the night and ESPN's largest audience up to this point. ESPN president George Bodenheimer described it as an "honor to document a truly spectacular evening."

=== Box score ===
Week 3: Atlanta Falcons at New Orleans Saints – Game summary

Quarter	1	2	3	4	Total
Falcons	3	0	0	0	3
Saints	14	6	3	0	23

at Louisiana Superdome, New Orleans, Louisiana

- Date: September 25
- Game time: 8:48 p.m. CDT
- Game weather: None (indoor stadium)
- Game attendance: 70,003
- Referee: Ed Hochuli
- TV announcers (ESPN): Mike Tirico, Joe Theismann, Tony Kornheiser, Suzy Kolber, and Michele Tafoya
- Pro Football Reference

Game information

First quarter

- NO – Curtis Deloatch 0-yard blocked punt return (John Carney kick), 13:30. Saints 7–0.
- ATL – Morten Andersen 26-yard field goal, 9:41. Saints 7–3. Drive: 9 plays, 65 yards, 3:49.
- NO – Devery Henderson 11-yard run (John Carney kick), 2:54. Saints 14–3. Drive: 8 plays, 52 yards, 4:05.

Second quarter

- NO – John Carney 37-yard field goal, 6:44. Saints 17–3. Drive: 10 plays, 71 yards, 5:05.
- NO – John Carney 51-yard field goal, 0:00. Saints 20–3. Drive: 10 plays, 53 yards, 1:49.

Third quarter

- NO – John Carney 20-yard field goal, 7:14. Saints 23–3. Drive: 12 plays, 73 yards, 7:46.

Fourth quarter

- No scoring plays

Top passers

- ATL – Michael Vick – 12/31, 137 yards
- NO – Drew Brees – 20/28, 191 yards

Top rushers

- ATL – Michael Vick – 6 rushes, 57 yards
- NO – Deuce McAllister – 13 rushes, 81 yards

Top receivers

- ATL – Alge Crumpler – 5 receptions, 49 yards
- NO – Marques Colston – 7 receptions, 97 yards

== Aftermath ==
With the win, the Saints improved to 3–0 to match their 2005 record and take the lead in the NFC South. Conversely, the Falcons fell to 2–1.

Both teams met again on November 26 at the Georgia Dome in Atlanta, where the Saints blew out the Falcons 31–13. Vick led all players with 166 rushing yards, but threw for just 32 yards and was sacked three times; his receivers also dropped five of his passes. Brees recorded two touchdown passes while his offense committed zero turnovers, an improvement from when they had seven across their last two games entering Week 12. The victory pushed the Saints up to 7–4 and sole possession of the division lead after the Panthers lost that day, while the Falcons dropped to 5–6 and third.

New Orleans would finish the regular season with a 10–6 record, their most successful season up to that point, and made the playoffs for the first time since 2000 with the league's top ranked offense. In the 2006–07 NFL playoffs, they defeated the Philadelphia Eagles at the Superdome in the divisional round, just the second postseason win in team history, before falling to the Chicago Bears in the NFC Championship Game. Despite not reaching Super Bowl XLI, the season was regarded as a success for how it reinvigorated a recovering New Orleans. ESPN writer Wayne Drehs wrote the Saints gave "their fans something they never thought they'd feel about a professional football team they call their own. Hope."

The Falcons, who started the season 5–2, won just two more games after that. The collapse, described as going from "angling for home-field advantage in the playoffs to showing all the telltale signs of a team in disarray," ended with a final record of 7–9. Mora was fired at season's end. He quipped in 2016 about Week 3 that "we didn't stand a chance. The whole world was against us that night. And for some reason, at the end of the day, that seemed okay with me."

Gleason retired from football after becoming a free agent following the 2007 season. Despite not being on the roster when the Saints won Super Bowl XLIV in 2009, he received a Super Bowl ring two years later in recognition of his long-term impact on the team. 2006 was Deloatch's only season with the Saints due to injury.

== Legacy ==
The victory was nicknamed the "'Rebirth' game" in Saints lore since it "symbolized the rebirth of the city of New Orleans." It received an ESPY Award in 2007 for the "Best Moment" in sports of 2006.

Gleason adopted the phrase "Never punt" as a personal motto and teasing remark, which he tweeted in 2019 after the Saints' Michael Mauti (who attended the 2006 game) blocked a Falcons punt and returned it for a touchdown. In 2024, New York Jets punter and ex-Saint Thomas Morstead launched the "Punt for ALS" campaign, a reference to Gleason's slogan, to raise funds for the Team Gleason Foundation to support those with ALS; Gleason was diagnosed with the disease in 2011. In addition to contributions from fans, Morstead donated $1,000 for every punt he placed within the opposing 20-yard line during the 2024 NFL season, and the campaign raised $101,022.

"Rebirth", a nine-foot statue sculpted by Brian Hanlon of Gleason's blocked punt, was erected outside the Superdome on July 27, 2012. Although Koenen is depicted as well, Falcons logos are absent on his uniform as the team did not grant the Saints rights to use their branding; Atlanta president Rich McKay stressed the decision was unrelated to the rivalry and was because they deemed it inappropriate to have their logos for a moment specifically honoring the Saints. On Twitter, Koenen called the statue's commemoration an "awesome day for an inspirational man" and quipped at Gleason, "Half of me likes your statue".

Ten years and a day after the game, the Saints hosted the Falcons again in 2016. Thomas returned to perform the national anthem while Gleason was an honorary captain. The Falcons, who went on to reach Super Bowl LI, won 45–32. Ironically, the game also saw a Falcons punt end in a fumble, albeit due to Saints players De'Vante Harris and Tommylee Lewis colliding as they tried to return it before being recovered by Atlanta's LaRoy Reynolds. Falcons defensive tackle Jonathan Babineaux, who was on the 2006 and 2016 teams, drew parallels between Gleason's block and Reynolds' recovery as both plays "pretty much electrified the whole dome" and swung momentum within the recovering teams' favor.

On April 6, 2020, with live sports on hold due to the COVID-19 pandemic, ESPN aired the full replay of the game as part of its "Monday Night Football Classics" series. The re-run was watched by over 70 thousand households in New Orleans for a peak rating of 11.7.
