= Effect of Hurricane Katrina on the New Orleans Saints =

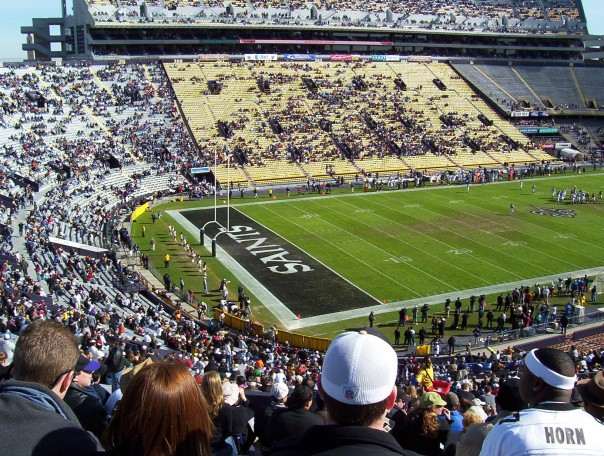
Tiger Stadium in Baton Rouge, Louisiana in 2005 during one of the Saints' four home games there. They also played three home games at the Alamodome in San Antonio, Texas and one at the now demolished Giants Stadium in East Rutherford, New Jersey

Hurricane Katrina devastated the city of New Orleans, Louisiana on August 29, 2005 and caused extensive damage to the Louisiana Superdome. As a result, the National Football League (NFL)'s New Orleans Saints were unable to play any home games at the Superdome for the entire 2005 NFL regular season. The dome was also used as a storm shelter for people who were unable to evacuate the city before the storm.

The Saints practice facility was not flooded and suffered minimal damage during the hurricane but was unable to be used by the Saints because it was being occupied by FEMA and by evacuees.

== Before Hurricane Katrina ==
In April 2005, Tom Benson, owner of the Saints, halted lease negotiations with the state of Louisiana until after the completion of the 2005 NFL season, due to a stadium dispute. Rumors quickly began to spread that San Antonio, Texas, Albuquerque, New Mexico and Los Angeles, California were being considered as possible destinations for the team. In May, it was reported that Benson had strong interest in relocating to San Antonio due to owning a substantial amount of property in the region and having strong business interests within the city, specifically related to his car dealership empire.

== After Hurricane Katrina ==
After practicing for approximately a week in San Jose, California, where they had evacuated in conjunction with a pre-season game against the Oakland Raiders, the team set up temporary headquarters at the San Antonio Marriott Riverwalk and Henry B. González Convention Center. Practice facilities were arranged at a sports complex adjacent to Luther Burbank High School in San Antonio, Texas.

The league then announced that although the Saints' first home game on September 18 against the New York Giants would be played at Giants Stadium at 7:30 p.m. EDT on September 19, other home games would be split between Tiger Stadium (the stadium of the LSU Tigers football) at LSU in Baton Rouge (80 miles/130 km from New Orleans), and the Alamodome in San Antonio (540 miles/869 km from New Orleans); offices and practice would remain in San Antonio throughout the season.

== Prospective relocation controversy ==
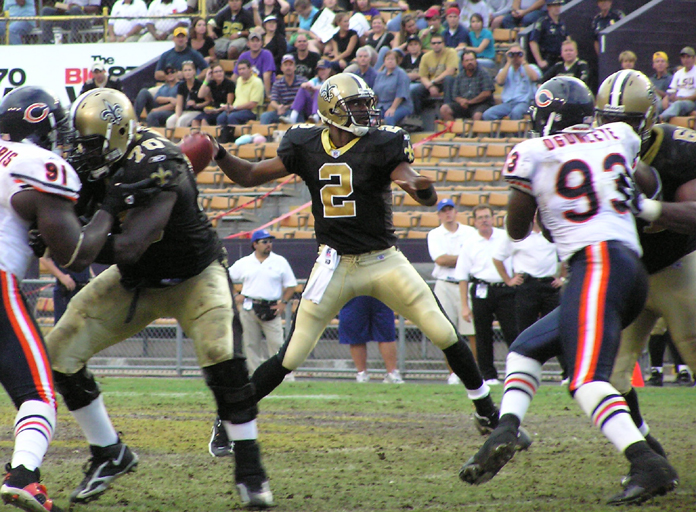
Saints quarterback Aaron Brooks during a home game at Tiger Stadium against the Chicago Bears in November 2005.

Various media reports in the San Antonio Express-News indicated the owner and government officials in San Antonio were working behind the scenes concerning a possible permanent relocation to San Antonio. San Antonio Mayor Phil Hardberger had pushed a strong verbal campaign to pursue the Saints. Other officials, including Texas Governor Rick Perry, had indicated that they would also support a relocation to San Antonio, including using funding to upgrade the Alamodome, or possibly build a new stadium. Dallas Cowboys owner Jerry Jones, whose team currently has San Antonio as part of its territorial rights, also supported an NFL team moving to San Antonio. However, the NFL and commissioner Paul Tagliabue were both in favor of keeping the franchise in New Orleans or at least delaying a decision on a potential relocation. Other rumors of the period said that the NFL preferred to move the team to Los Angeles, or even to expand to Toronto instead, as both cities are over twice the size of San Antonio.

Fans in Louisiana were angered and felt that Hardberger and Perry were taking advantage of New Orleans' misfortunes to try to steal the Saints. Benson's actions also drew the anger of New Orleans Mayor Ray Nagin, who called Benson's actions "shameful and disrespectful" to New Orleans fans who have supported the team for nearly four decades of mostly losing seasons. San Antonio officials, on the other hand, countered that Benson may have no choice—at the time, it was thought by some that New Orleans might never fully recover as a viable location for an NFL franchise, and that they were simply giving the franchise an option to relocate and remain economically viable, in this case to a city in which Benson already lives and has business interests. Benson indicated in his open letter to the Gulf Coast that San Antonio officials were only doing what any city seeking a franchise would do—recruit the franchise.

CNN reported on September 7, 2005 that the hurricane had so badly damaged the Louisiana Superdome that it would likely have to be demolished. On October 21, Benson issued a statement saying that he had not made any decision about the future of the Saints. However, the San Antonio Express-News reported that sources close to the Saints organization said that Benson planned to void his lease agreement with New Orleans by declaring the Superdome unusable.

On October 17, Benson faced further criticism after dismissing vice president Arnold Fielkow. Reports say Fielkow was called into Benson's office, and when Fielkow refused an offer to keep information between them confidential in exchange for payment, he was fired. NFL Commissioner Paul Tagliabue met with Benson and Louisiana governor Kathleen Blanco at the Saints's first home game in Baton Rouge on October 30 against the Miami Dolphins. After the meeting, he stopped just short of making a formal commitment to keep the Saints in New Orleans. Said Tagliabue: "The Saints are Louisiana's team and have been since the late '60s when my predecessor Pete Rozelle welcomed them to the league as New Orleans' team and Louisiana's team. Our focus continues to be on having the Saints in Louisiana." He dispelled rumors that had the Saints relocating to Los Angeles. Tagliabue appointed an eight-owner advisory committee to help decide the team's future. Benson left the game with five minutes left in the fourth quarter, with the Saints losing to the Miami Dolphins. A WWL-TV camera crew recorded him leaving the stadium, and Benson angrily pushed the camera away, causing a microphone to fall off, and then got into an argument with a fan. Three days later, Benson issued a statement to NFL Commissioner Tagliabue stating that he would no longer go to Baton Rouge for Saints home games because he felt he and his family were in danger from abuse at the game, adding that security at Tiger Stadium was "inadequate to nonexistent."

The following day, Benson agreed with Louisiana state officials to extend his opt out clause with the Superdome and Louisiana because of the disaster until January 2007.

In the midst of the Katrina relocation controversy, several groups of investors approached Benson with offers to buy the team and keep them in Louisiana, the most notable group being one led by Fox Sports analyst and former Pittsburgh Steelers quarterback Terry Bradshaw, who is a Louisiana native. However, Benson expressed that he had no intention of selling the team and planned to eventually hand down ownership to his granddaughter, Saints owner/executive Rita Benson LeBlanc. Benson spoke to press following an NFL owners' meeting on November 15, during which he reiterated that the team was not for sale, but also stated that other NFL owners, along with Tagliabue, were working with him to keep the team in New Orleans.

On December 5, Tagliabue met with Benson and New Orleans officials to tour the city and to assess the viability of playing in New Orleans in 2006. Tagliabue stated, "Our goal is to play some games in the Superdome in 2006."

On January 11, 2006, at a press conference in New Orleans, Tagliabue announced that the Saints would likely play all eight home games at the Superdome. The NFL announced on February 5, 2006, that the Superdome would reopen on September 24 when the Saints were to host the Atlanta Falcons.

== Return to the Superdome ==
Starting in the fall of 2006, the Saints returned to playing all of their regular home games of the 2006 season in New Orleans at the Superdome. Their first game back in New Orleans, on September 25, 2006, was marked by a dramatic blocked punt early in the first quarter, with Steve Gleason blocking the punt and Curtis Deloatch recovering the ball in the Falcons' end zone for a touchdown. It was the first score in the Saints' first game in New Orleans in nearly 21 months. The Saints won the game and, unexpectedly, went on to have the most successful season in their history up to that time, reaching the NFC Championship Game for the first time in franchise history.

In April 2009, the franchise reached a deal that would keep the Saints in New Orleans until at least 2025, and a deal with the NFL that awarded them the Super Bowl after defeating the Minnesota Vikings. In the 2009 season, the Saints finished 13–3 and defeated the Indianapolis Colts in Super Bowl XLIV. In July 2012, Rebirth, a statue depicting Gleason blocking the punt, was erected outside the Superdome; a news report commented that the blocked punt "etched Steve Gleason into Saints lore and became symbolic of New Orleans' resilience in the face of disaster".

== See also ==
- Effect of Hurricane Katrina on the New Orleans Hornets
- Effect of Hurricane Katrina on the Louisiana Superdome
