= Steve Gleason =

American football player and activist (born 1977)

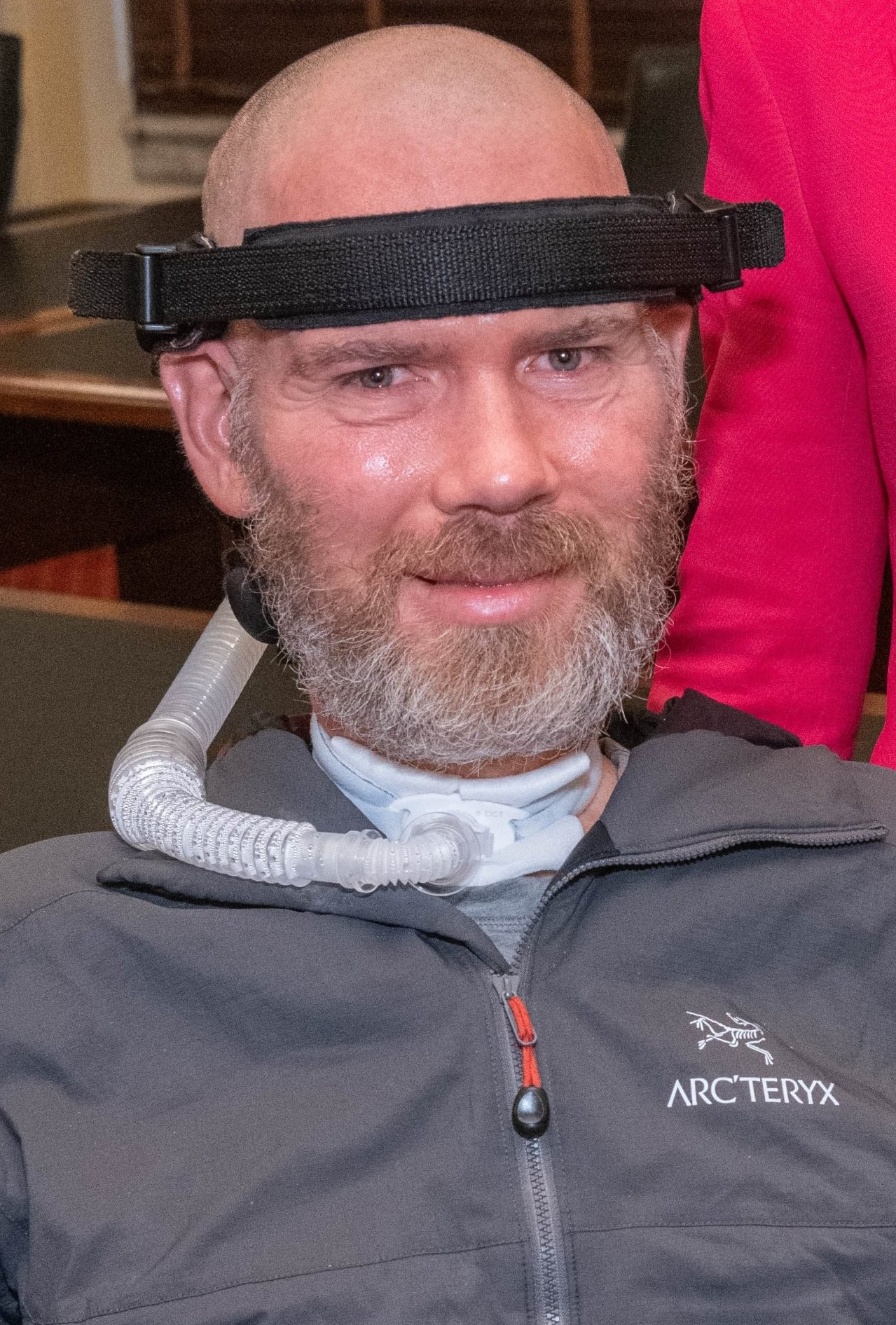
- Gleason in 2020

No. 37
- Position: Safety

Personal information
- Born: March 19, 1977 (age 49); Spokane, Washington, U.S.
- Listed height: 5 ft 11 in (1.80 m)
- Listed weight: 212 lb (96 kg)

Career information
- High school: Gonzaga Prep (Spokane, Washington)
- College: Washington State (1995–1999)
- NFL draft: 2000: undrafted

Career history
- Indianapolis Colts (2000)*; New Orleans Saints (2000–2007); → Rhein Fire (2001)
- * Offseason or practice squad member only

Awards and highlights
- Second-team All-Pac-10 (1999); George Halas Award (2015); NCAA Inspiration Award (2022); Arthur Ashe Courage Award (2024)

Career NFL statistics
- Total tackles: 71
- Fumble recoveries: 2
- Stats at Pro Football Reference

Stephen Michael Gleason (born March 19, 1977) is an American former professional football player who played as a safety with the New Orleans Saints of the National Football League (NFL). He played college football for the Washington State Cougars. Originally signed by the Indianapolis Colts as an undrafted free agent in 2000, he played for the Saints through the 2006 season. As a free agent in 2008, Gleason retired from the NFL after eight seasons.

Gleason is particularly known for his block of a punt early in a 2006 game, which became a symbol of recovery in New Orleans in the team's first home game after Hurricane Katrina.

In 2011, Gleason revealed that he was battling amyotrophic lateral sclerosis (ALS). His experiences while living with the disease were captured on video over the course of a five-year period and featured in the 2016 documentary Gleason.

Gleason was awarded a Congressional Gold Medal in 2019 and the Arthur Ashe Courage Award in 2024 for his contributions to ALS awareness.

== Early life and education ==
Born and raised in Spokane, Washington, Gleason attended high school at Gonzaga Prep, where he earned consecutive defensive MVP awards as a linebacker in the Greater Spokane League (GSL). He was also a fullback on offense.

=== College years ===
Gleason then played college football for the Washington State Cougars. He was a starting linebacker for the 1997 team that lost in the Rose Bowl. He was a four-year starter for the Cougars baseball team in center field and holds the school record for triples.

== Professional football career ==
The Indianapolis Colts signed Gleason as an undrafted free agent in 2000. He was released by the team after the preseason and was signed to the New Orleans Saints' practice squad in November. He was chosen by the Birmingham Thunderbolts with the 191st pick of the 2001 XFL draft.

On September 25, 2006, Gleason was responsible for one of the most dramatic and memorable moments in Saints history when he blocked a punt by Atlanta Falcons punter Michael Koenen early in the first quarter of a game at the Superdome. Curtis Deloatch recovered the ball in the Falcons' end zone for a touchdown. It was the first score in the Saints' first game in New Orleans in nearly 21 months, during which time Hurricane Katrina had devastated the city and the team.

The Saints won the game and went on to have the most successful season in their history up to that time, going to the NFC Championship that year.

=== NFL career statistics ===
Legend
**Bold**	Career high

==== Regular season ====
Year	Team	Games		Tackles					Interceptions					Fumbles				Blocks
Year	Team	GP	GS	Cmb	Solo	Ast	Sck	TFL	Int	Yds	TD	Lng	PD	FF	FR	Yds	TD	Blk
2000	NO	3	0	3	2	1	0.0	0	0	0	0	0	0	0	0	0	0	0
2001	NO	7	0	3	3	0	0.0	0	0	0	0	0	0	0	**1**	0	0	0
2002	NO	14	0	16	15	1	0.0	0	0	0	0	0	0	0	0	0	0	0
2003	NO	**16**	0	8	8	0	0.0	0	0	0	0	0	0	0	**1**	0	0	0
2004	NO	15	0	9	7	**2**	0.0	0	0	0	0	0	0	0	0	0	0	0
2005	NO	13	**1**	14	12	**2**	0.0	0	0	0	0	0	0	0	0	0	0	0
2006	NO	15	0	**18**	**17**	1	0.0	0	0	0	0	0	0	0	0	0	0	**1**
		83	1	71	64	7	0.0	0	0	0	0	0	0	0	2	0	0	1

==== Playoffs ====
Year	Team	Games		Tackles					Interceptions					Fumbles			
Year	Team	GP	GS	Cmb	Solo	Ast	Sck	TFL	Int	Yds	TD	Lng	PD	FF	FR	Yds	TD
2000	NO	1	0	0	0	0	0.0	0	0	0	0	0	0	0	0	0	0
2006	NO	**2**	0	**1**	**1**	0	0.0	0	0	0	0	0	0	0	0	0	0
		3	0	1	1	0	0.0	0	0	0	0	0	0	0	0	0	0

== Personal life ==
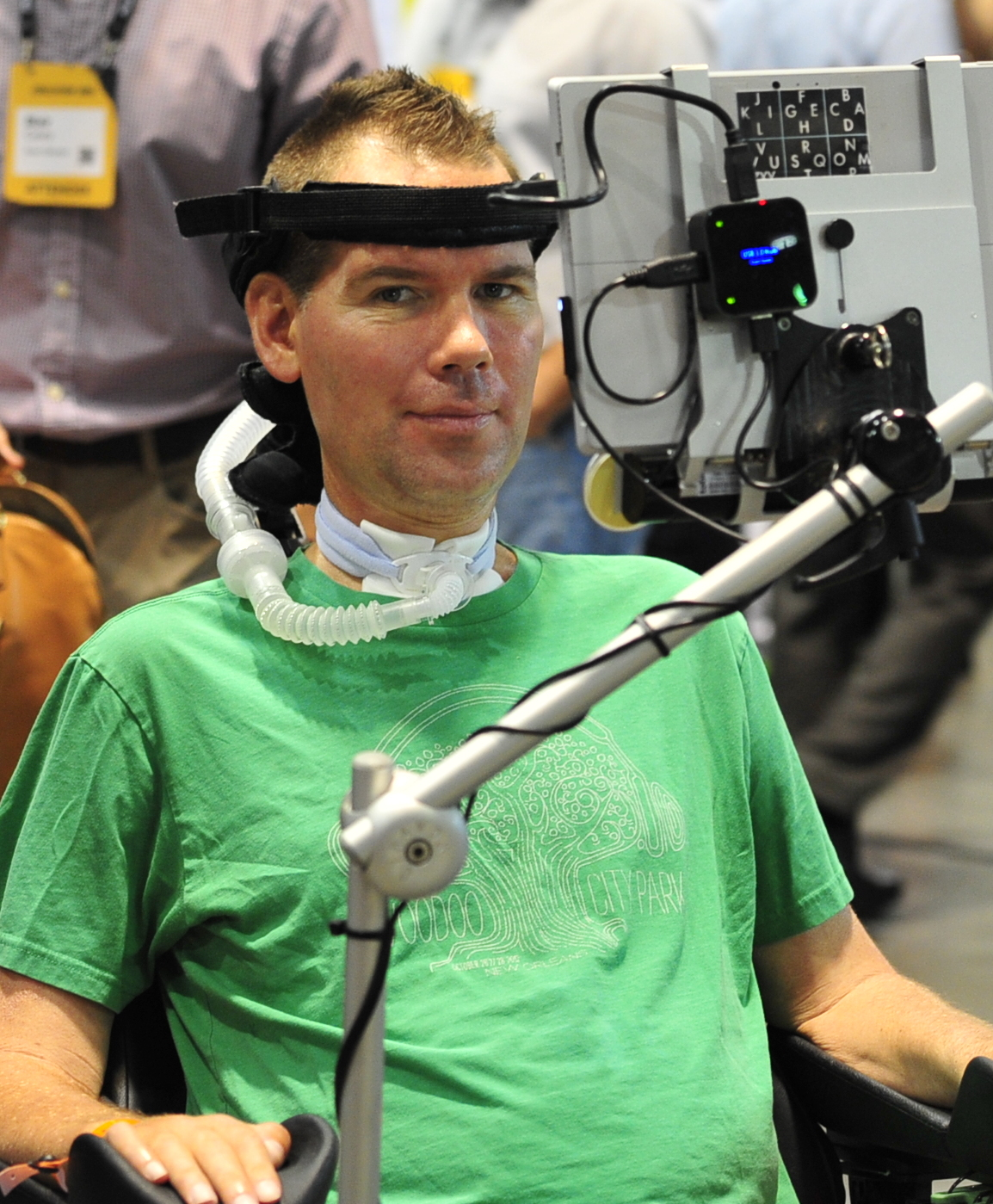
Gleason in 2016

Gleason and his wife, Michel Rae Varisco, have a son, Rivers, and a daughter, Gray. Six weeks after receiving a diagnosis of ALS, the couple discovered they were expecting their first child.

Gleason, who lost his voice to ALS, had his voice cloned by CereProc, a Scottish speech synthesis company.

== Awards and honors ==
In September 2011, the Saints awarded Gleason a Super Bowl ring. At the same ceremony, he was awarded the key to the city of New Orleans by mayor Mitch Landrieu. In July 2012, Rebirth, a statue depicting Gleason blocking the punt, was raised outside the Superdome.

In 2015, Gleason was chosen to receive the 2015 George Halas Award from the Pro Football Writers Association. He was presented the award at the Thursday Night Football game between the Saints and Falcons on October 15, 2015. Near the end of the first quarter, he watched as Saints linebacker Michael Mauti blocked a punt by Falcons punter Matt Bosher and returned it for a touchdown to give the Saints a 14–0 lead. Mauti, a New Orleans native and the son of former Saints player Rich Mauti, had attended the 2006 game where Gleason made his famous block. The Saints went on to beat the Falcons, 31–21. After the blocked punt, Gleason tweeted: "Hey, Falcons. #NeverPunt -SG".

In 2019, Gleason was awarded with a Congressional Gold Medal for his contributions to ALS awareness, and became the first NFL player to ever receive the award. Gleason was presented with the award at a ceremony in Washington, D.C., on January 15, 2020. In 2024, he was awarded the Arthur Ashe Courage Award for his contributions to ALS awareness.

== In popular culture ==
Gleason originally collaborated with filmmaker Sean Pamphilon to produce a documentary on his battle with ALS that would double as a video journal for his infant son, Rivers. Ultimately, the film was produced by Kimi Culp, Scott Fujita, Seth Gordon, Mary Rohlich, and Kevin Lake. The documentary film Gleason was shown during the 2016 Sundance Film Festival.

Gleason was featured in an episode of the documentary series A Football Life that detailed his career in the NFL and battle with ALS. NFL Network aired the episode in late November 2013.

== Works ==
In April 2024, Knopf released Gleason's memoir A Life Impossible: Living with ALS: Finding Peace and Wisdom Within a Fragile Existence. On October 5, 2026, Gleason appeared on ESPN's ManningCast during the Falcons vs Saints matchup. In the broadcast, Gleason shared the story of his famous "Rebirth" punt block, as well as sharing some humorous moments with the Manning brothers.
