= Michael Koenen =

American football player (born 1982)

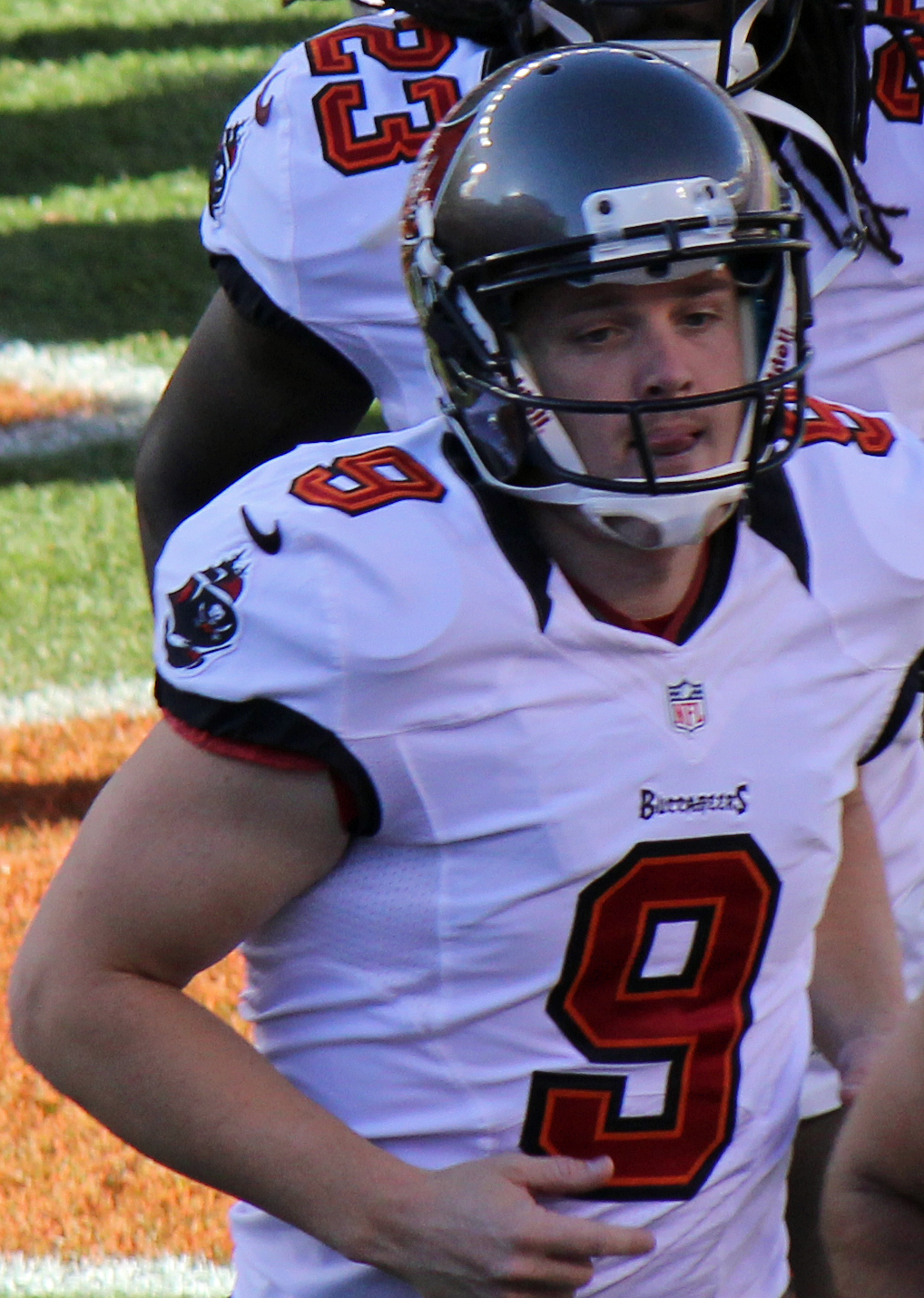
- Koenen in 2012

No. 9
- Position: Punter

Personal information
- Born: July 13, 1982 (age 44); Ferndale, Washington, U.S.
- Listed height: 5 ft 11 in (1.80 m)
- Listed weight: 198 lb (90 kg)

Career information
- High school: Ferndale
- College: Western Washington (2000–2004)
- NFL draft: 2005: undrafted

Career history
- Atlanta Falcons (2005−2010); Tampa Bay Buccaneers (2011−2014)

Career NFL statistics
- Punts: 748
- Punt yards: 31,964
- Punting yard average: 42.7
- Stats at Pro Football Reference

Michael J. Koenen (born July 13, 1982) is an American former professional football player who was a punter in the National Football League (NFL). He was signed by the Atlanta Falcons as an undrafted free agent in 2005. He played college football for the Western Washington Vikings. He also played for the Tampa Bay Buccaneers.

== Early life ==
Koenen attended Ferndale High School in Ferndale, Washington, and was a letterman in football, basketball, and soccer. In football, he won All-Northwest League honors as a senior.

== College career ==
Koenen played college football for Western Washington University in Bellingham, Washington, and is one of only three NFL players to have played football for that school. While there, he received numerous Division II All-American honors from sources such as Street & Smith, Lindy's Football Annuals, Don Hanen's Football Gazette, Daktronics, Inc., and D2football.com, as well as being recognized by the NCAA. He was also named a Great Northwest Athletic Conference (GNAC) all-star four times as a placekicker and twice as a punter. He ended his college career as the Western Washington University, GNAC, and Northwest small college all-time leader in kicking scoring with 272 points, including 43 field goals and 143 PATs. He participated in the 2005 Cactus Bowl.

== Professional career ==
=== Atlanta Falcons ===
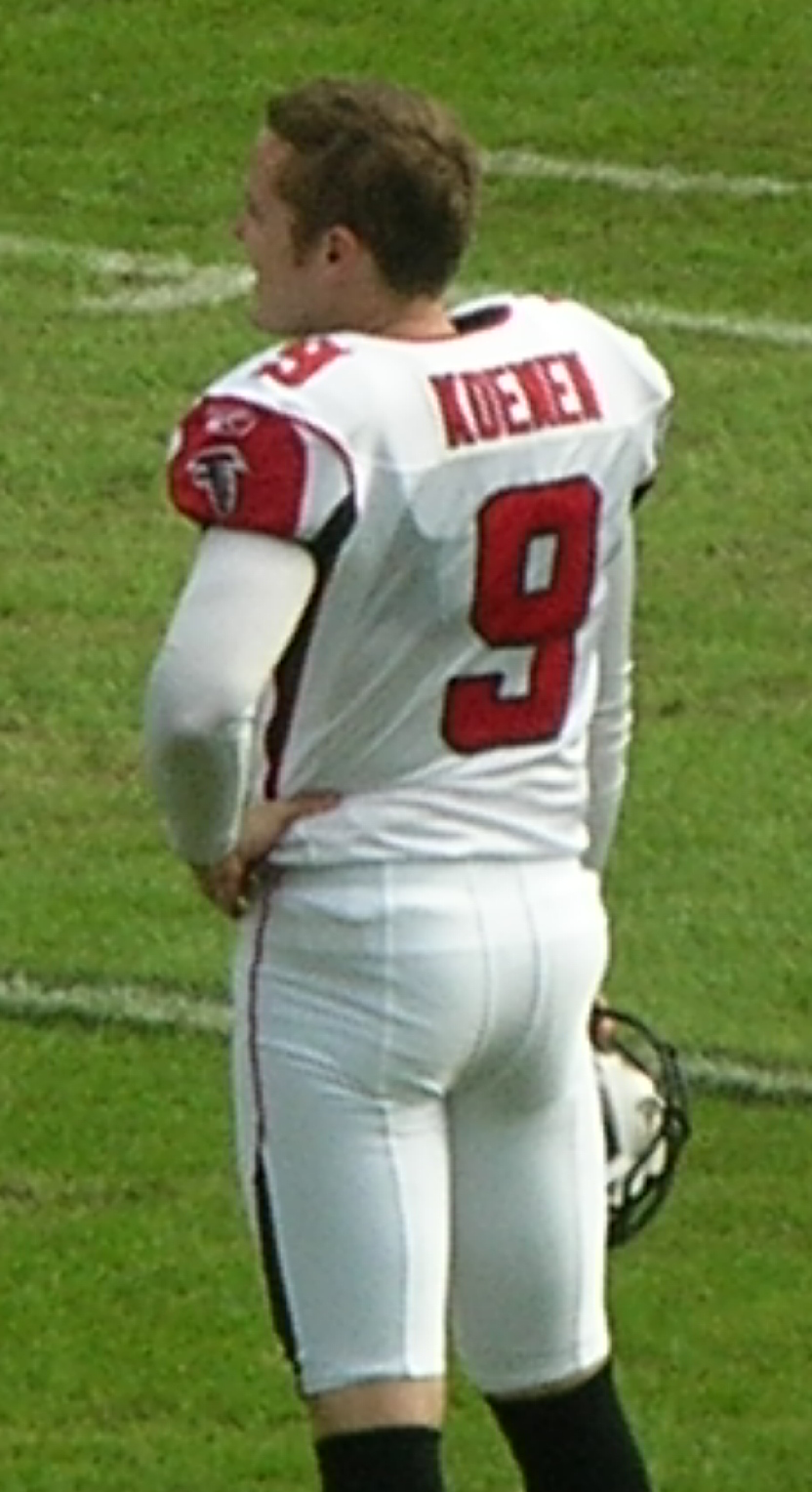
Koenen in 2008

Koenen signed a two-year free agent contract with the Atlanta Falcons on April 26, 2005. He went on to edge out veteran punter Toby Gowin, who had also signed a free agent deal that offseason, for the starting job with the Falcons. He appeared in all sixteen regular season games for the Falcons, punting 78 times for 3,300 yards, which was good for a 42.3 yards per punt average and ninth in the NFC. He also served as the team's kickoff specialist and was seventh in the NFC in yards per kickoff. His 14 touchbacks put him behind only Pro Bowler Neil Rackers.

In the Falcons' October 9, 2005 game against the New England Patriots, they had the ball on New England's 41 yard line with six seconds remaining in the first half. Since regular placekicker Todd Peterson's range was insufficient to attempt a field goal from that distance, Falcons head coach Jim Mora turned to Koenen. Koenen actually attempted the kick, the first field goal attempt in his pro career, twice. Prior to the initial snap, Patriots linebacker Mike Vrabel called a timeout. Koenen heard the referee's whistle but still kicked the field goal. It landed right of the goalpost. A few moments later, Koenen attempted the kick again, and this time made an official 58-yard field goal. It was the longest field goal of Koenen's career at any level, tied for the ninth longest in NFL history (as well as the single longest in the 2005 season), and was the third longest in history by an undrafted kicker.

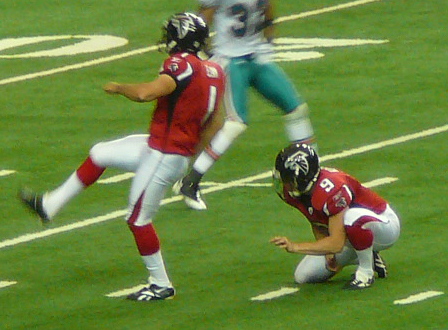
Koenen (right) holding for placekicker Jason Elam with the Falcons in 2009.

In the Falcons' first preseason game of 2006, Koenen made four field goals, from 53, 50, 40, and 45 yards, along with doing the punting and kickoff duties. Koenen was slated to do the placekicking, punting, and kickoffs for the Falcons, something that is rarely done in the NFL by one player; however after he converted only two of eight field goal attempts to start the regular season, the Falcons brought back Morten Andersen, who had kicked in Super Bowl XXXIII for Atlanta eight years earlier, to take over field goal duties. Koenen retained his duties on punts and kickoffs.

During the first game after this change, Koenen was involved in an iconic play. The Falcons visited the New Orleans Saints on Monday Night Football in the first home game for the Saints at the Louisiana Superdome since Hurricane Katrina had devastated the city and the stadium. Koenen's first punt of the game was blocked by Saints safety Steve Gleason. Gleason's block bounced into the end zone and was recovered for a touchdown by Curtis Deloatch. The score put New Orleans up 7–0, a game Atlanta would lose 23–3. The moment was widely considered a moment of revitalization for the city of New Orleans after the hurricane, and a statue of the play was later dedicated outside the Superdome in 2012. Gleason, who was diagnosed with ALS in 2011, and Koenen are both depicted in full on the sculpture. Koenen's name and Falcons logos are absent from the statue, due to the Falcons view that including these marks would be inappropriate, though Koenen later stated that he would not have been opposed to his name being included on the statue if he been approached about it. Koenen also reached out to Gleason on Twitter congratulating him.

For the 2007 season, Koenen returned solely as the Falcons' punter; the club signed Billy Cundiff to handle the other kicking duties. Cundiff was released before the season; Matt Prater was signed but also released after a short while, and the placekicking was again done by Andersen.

A restricted free agent in the 2008 offseason, Koenen was tendered a one-year, $1.417 million contract by the Falcons. He re-signed on April 14.

A free agent in the 2009 offseason, the Falcons placed the franchise tag on Koenen on February 9. He signed the one-year, $2.48 million tender offer on February 13.

=== Tampa Bay Buccaneers ===
Koenen was signed by the Tampa Bay Buccaneers to a six-year, $19.5-million contract on July 29, 2011. He was released at the end of the preseason in September 2015.

An attempt to return to the NFL in 2016 was aborted due to complications from colitis that he claims was contracted after drinking contaminated water in Tampa. At one point, he lost 44 pounds following a clostridioides difficile infection.

== NFL career statistics ==
Legend
	Led the league
**Bold**	Career high

=== Regular season ===
Year	Team	Punting									
Year	Team	GP	Punts	Yds	Net Yds	Lng	Avg	Net Avg	Blk	Ins20	TB
2005	ATL	16	78	3,300	2,882	67	42.3	36.9	0	23	**9**
2006	ATL	16	76	3,199	2,800	65	42.1	35.9	**2**	25	6
2007	ATL	16	**88**	3,824	**3,417**	63	43.5	38.8	0	**30**	5
2008	ATL	16	63	2,566	2,437	60	40.7	37.5	**2**	25	4
2009	ATL	16	61	2,598	2,249	**70**	42.6	36.3	1	18	3
2010	ATL	16	74	3,014	2,673	61	40.7	35.6	1	29	5
2011	TB	16	67	3,023	2,697	65	45.1	**40.3**	0	24	3
2012	TB	16	76	3,440	2,880	64	**45.3**	37.4	1	22	6
2013	TB	16	87	**3,846**	3,333	62	44.2	38.3	0	19	6
2014	TB	16	78	3,154	2,929	56	40.4	37.1	1	17	2
Career		160	748	31,964	28,297	70	42.7	37.4	8	232	49

=== Playoffs ===
Year	Team	Punting									
Year	Team	GP	Punts	Yds	Net Yds	Lng	Avg	Net Avg	Blk	Ins20	TB
2008	ATL	**1**	**5**	**212**	**213**	49	**42.4**	**42.6**	0	0	0
2010	ATL	**1**	3	111	111	**57**	37.0	37.0	0	**1**	0
Career		2	8	323	324	57	40.4	40.5	0	1	0

== Personal life ==
Koenen, who majored in general studies, has been married to Devin Koenen since July 14, 2006.
