= New Birth =

New Birth may refer to:

- New Birth (band), an American musical group
  - The New Birth (album), their 1970 debut album
- Born again, a spiritual rebirth in some forms of Christianity
  - Regeneration (theology), a Christian theological concept
- Dvija, a Hindu theological concept
- New Birth Missionary Baptist Church, a megachurch in Georgia, United States
