= Curtis Deloatch =

American football player (born 1981)

No. 39, 41
- Position: Cornerback

Personal information
- Born: October 4, 1981 (age 45); Murfreesboro, North Carolina, U.S.
- Listed height: 6 ft 3 in (1.91 m)
- Listed weight: 214 lb (97 kg)

Career information
- College: North Carolina A&T (1999–2003)
- NFL draft: 2004: undrafted

Career history
- New York Giants (2004–2005); New Orleans Saints (2006); Carolina Panthers (2007); Florida Tuskers (2009)*
- * Offseason or practice squad member only

Awards and highlights
- Consensus FCS All-American (2001); First-team All-MEAC (2001); Second-team All-MEAC (2003)

Career NFL statistics
- Total tackles: 99
- Forced fumbles: 1
- Pass deflections: 14
- Interceptions: 1
- Touchdowns: 1
- Stats at Pro Football Reference

Curtis Lee Deloatch (born October 4, 1981) is an American former professional football player who was a cornerback in the National Football League (NFL). He was signed by the New York Giants as an undrafted free agent in 2004. He played college football for the North Carolina A&T Aggies.

Deloatch was also a member of the New Orleans Saints, Carolina Panthers, and Florida Tuskers.

== Early life ==
Deloatch played high school football at Hertford County High School in Ahoskie, North Carolina.

== College career ==
Deloatch attended North Carolina Agricultural and Technical State University. As a redshirt freshman, he played in the team's final eight games as a reserve free safety. He recorded seven tackles (four solo) with nine pass deflections and an interception. He also returned 12 punts for 143 yards (11.9-yard avg.) and five kickoffs for 104 yards (20.8-yard avg.)

As a sophomore in 2001, Deloatch was a consensus All-American and first-team All-Mid-Eastern Athletic Conference choice. He lined up at free safety and recorded 26 tackles (18 solo) with a stop for a 3-yard loss. Deloatch set school and conference season-records, as he gained 248 yards with a pair of touchdowns on four interceptions. He deflected six passes and returned eight kickoffs for 392 yards (34.0 avg). He set NCAA Division I-AA season-records as he scored five times on 20 punts for a school season-record 530 yards, leading the nation with a 26.5-yard average.

As a junior, Deloatch appeared in ten games at strong-side cornerback, recording 14 tackles (ten solo) with an assisted stop for a 3-yard loss. He intercepted a pass, deflected six others and returned 28 punts for 193 yards (6.9 avg).

As a senior, Deloatch was an All-MEAC second-team selection as a defensive back. He played in every game and had 21 tackles (15 solo) with an assisted stop for a 3-yard loss. He intercepted four passes for 44 yards and a touchdown. He deflected eight passes and blocked a kick. Deloatch also returned 28 punts for 269 yards (9.6-yard avg.) and three kickoffs for 38 yards.

== Professional career ==
=== New York Giants ===
Deloatch played for the New York Giants in 2004 and 2005, having been acquired as an undrafted free agent.

In 2004, he was one of only two members of the Giants 2004 rookie class to play in all 16 regular season games (the other was linebacker Reggie Torbor.) The majority of action came on special teams and in nickel and dime packages. He finished with 17 tackles (15 solo) and 12 special teams tackles.

The following year, he played in all 16 regular season games with 13 starts at right cornerback, plus the NFC Wild Card Game. Finished the season with 54 tackles (45 solo), one interception, a team-high 12 passes defensed, one fumble recovery and four special teams tackles.

He was waived by the Giants before the 2006 regular season.

=== New Orleans Saints ===
Deloatch was claimed by the New Orleans Saints on September 3, 2006.

Less than three weeks later, he scored one of the most dramatic touchdowns in Saints history, when he recovered a Michael Koenen punt blocked by Steve Gleason against the Atlanta Falcons. Deloatch was a late substitution on the play, told to run onto the field at the last second when Saints special teams coordinator John Bonamego noticed that only 10 men were on the field. He had no preparation for the play, was told to "just go rush the kick." It was the first touchdown in the Saints' first home game in nearly 21 months, since Hurricane Katrina devastated the city.

=== Carolina Panthers ===
In 2007, Deloatch signed with the Carolina Panthers but tore his ACL in October against the Colts ending his season. He was placed on injured reserve by the Carolina Panthers on October 31, 2007.

On May 27, 2008, Deloatch was re-signed by the Panthers. He was later released after the Panthers had to cut down their roster size.

=== Florida Tuskers ===
Deloatch was signed by the Florida Tuskers of the United Football League on August 25, 2009. He was released by the Tuskers on September 22.
