= Marlin N. Gusman =

American attorney and former sheriff of Orleans Parish, Louisiana

- Gusman on WWL-TV in June 2017

Sheriff of Orleans Parish
- In office 2010 – May 2, 2022
- Preceded by: Office established (consolidated sheriff)
- Succeeded by: Susan Hutson

Orleans Parish Criminal Sheriff
- In office 2004–2010
- Preceded by: Charles Foti
- Succeeded by: Office abolished (consolidated into Orleans Parish Sheriff)

Member of the New Orleans City Council from District D
- In office 2000–2004
- Preceded by: Roy Glapion
- Succeeded by: Cynthia Willard-Lewis

Chief Administrative Officer of New Orleans
- In office 1994–2000
- Appointed by: Marc Morial
- Succeeded by: Cedric Grant

Personal details
- Born: c. 1955 New Orleans, Louisiana, U.S.
- Party: Democratic
- Spouse: Renee Gusman
- Children: 2
- Education: University of Pennsylvania, Wharton School (BA, BS); Loyola University New Orleans (JD)
- Occupation: Attorney, politician

Marlin Noel Gusman (born c. 1955) is an American attorney and Democratic politician who served as the first black sheriff of Orleans Parish, Louisiana, from 2004 to 2022. He was first elected Orleans Parish Criminal Sheriff in a 2004 special election to succeed Charles Foti, and in 2010 he became the first sheriff of the consolidated Orleans Parish Sheriff's Office after the Louisiana Legislature merged the parish's separate civil and criminal sheriff offices. Before becoming sheriff he served as Chief Administrative Officer of New Orleans under Mayor Marc Morial from 1994 to 2000 and as a member of the New Orleans City Council for District D from 2000 to 2004.

Gusman took office as criminal sheriff about ten months before Hurricane Katrina struck New Orleans in August 2005, and much of his tenure was defined by the storm's aftermath: the flooding of Orleans Parish Prison and the emergency evacuation of thousands of inmates, human-rights findings that hundreds of prisoners had been abandoned, and a multi-year effort to rebuild the jail with Federal Emergency Management Agency (FEMA) funds. In 2009 the United States Department of Justice found conditions at the jail unconstitutional, and in 2013 U.S. District Judge Lance Africk approved a sweeping consent decree in the class action Jones v. Gusman. After federal monitors documented continuing violence, suicides and understaffing, Gusman agreed in 2016 to cede day-to-day control of the jail to an independent compliance director; he did not regain full authority until 2020.

Gusman also oversaw a reduction of the jail population from nearly 6,300 before Katrina to under 900, the opening of the Orleans Justice Center in 2015, and the expansion of inmate education and re-entry programs, developments that he and other officials credited to reforms undertaken with the city, courts and advocacy groups. He won re-election in 2006, 2010, 2014 and 2017, defeating his predecessor Foti in a 2014 runoff, but was defeated in the December 11, 2021, runoff by Susan Hutson, leaving office in May 2022. After the May 2025 escape of ten inmates from the Orleans Justice Center, Gusman publicly criticized his successor's management while defending the jail he had built.

== Early life and education ==
Gusman was born in New Orleans around 1955 and grew up in Gretna on the West Bank of the Mississippi River, commuting to attend Jesuit High School in New Orleans, from which he graduated in the class of 1973. He later recalled that his family made sacrifices to enable his attendance and that "Jesuit always made me feel that I could do whatever I set my mind to."

In 1977 he received both a Bachelor of Arts and a Bachelor of Science from the University of Pennsylvania's Wharton School of Finance and Commerce. He earned his Juris Doctor from Loyola University and was admitted to the Louisiana State Bar in 1984. He later completed the Program for Senior Executives in State and Local Government at Harvard University's John F. Kennedy School of Government. Gusman worked in the insurance industry with the United States Fidelity and Guaranty Company and the Laurance Eustis Insurance Company, practiced law in association with the firm of Ernest N. Morial, and served as a regional attorney for the Louisiana Department of Revenue and Taxation.

== Early career ==
=== Morial administration ===
During the mayoralty of Ernest "Dutch" Morial, the city's first Black mayor, Gusman served as the city's first Minority Business Counselor and as Director of Property Management. In 1994 Mayor Marc Morial—Dutch Morial's son—appointed Gusman chief administrative officer, described in city records as the highest appointed city official and the city's chief financial officer. He held the position until July 2000, when he resigned to run for the City Council, and was succeeded by Deputy CAO Cedric Grant. Gusman also served on the Orleans Levee District board of commissioners and received the Mayor's Medal of Honor. When he later ran for sheriff, he sought to distance himself from the Morials amid federal investigations into contracts issued under Marc Morial's administration.

=== City Council ===
In his first bid for elective office, Gusman won the District D seat on the New Orleans City Council in 2000, filling the vacancy left by the death of Councilman Roy Glapion, and was re-elected in 2002. On the council he chaired the Budget, Audit and Board of Review Committee and the Governmental Affairs Committee and served as the council's representative to the Sewerage & Water Board.

== Orleans Parish Sheriff ==
=== 2004 special election and consolidation of the office ===
When Charles Foti—who had served as Orleans Parish Criminal Sheriff for about thirty years—was elected Attorney General of Louisiana and took office in January 2004, a special election was called to fill the remainder of his term. Gusman won the 2004 special election and became Orleans Parish Criminal Sheriff, taking over a jail complex that then held more than 6,000 people. The field included interim sheriff William Hunter, whom Gusman faced in the runoff, and Ira Thomas, who finished fourth and then supported Gusman. Gusman was re-elected to a full four-year term in 2006, when businessman Gerald DeSalvo also qualified for the criminal sheriff's race; the election was the first Orleans Parish cycle after Hurricane Katrina.

The parish's separate offices of civil sheriff and criminal sheriff were subsequently abolished and consolidated into a single Orleans Parish sheriff. Because of the timing of the change and its implementing legislation, the merger took effect with the election of a single sheriff at the February 6, 2010, municipal elections; Gusman won that election and became the first sheriff of the unified Orleans Parish Sheriff's Office.

=== Hurricane Katrina and the evacuation of Orleans Parish Prison ===
When Hurricane Katrina made landfall on August 29, 2005, Orleans Parish Prison was one of the largest jails in the United States, holding roughly 6,500 people across a complex of buildings; the sheriff's office rented many of its beds to the state and to federal authorities. As the city ordered its first mandatory evacuation, Gusman kept the inmates in place, publicly stating that "we're going to keep our prisoners where they belong," and the jail even accepted inmates from other facilities. After the storm, the jail's generators failed, the buildings lost power and water, toilets backed up, and inmates were left for days in flooded cells—some standing in sewage-tainted water up to their chests—while some deputies left their posts. Inmates were evacuated by boat to the Broad Street overpass before being bused to state facilities, among them the Elayn Hunt Correctional Center in St. Gabriel, where the American Civil Liberties Union documented allegations of assaults and abuse.

In a statement dated September 21, 2005, Human Rights Watch concluded that "the sheriff's department abandoned hundreds of inmates" and reported that inmates in the Templeman III building, which "held more than 600 inmates," said there were no correctional officers present as of August 29 and that they were not evacuated until Thursday, September 1, "four days after flood waters in the jail had reached chest-level." Researcher Corinne Carey said, "Prisoners were abandoned in their cells without food or water for days as floodwaters rose toward the ceiling." Human Rights Watch reported that Gusman "did not call for help in evacuating the prison until midnight on Monday, August 29," that the evacuation was not completed until Friday, September 2, and that 517 inmates—including 130 from Templeman III—were missing from the state's list of evacuated prisoners. A spokeswoman for the sheriff's department told Human Rights Watch that "nobody drowned, nobody was left behind."

In August 2006, the ACLU National Prison Project released a report titled Abandoned and Abused: Orleans Parish Prisoners in the Wake of Hurricane Katrina, based on more than 1,000 testimonials. An ACLU official said, "The Louisiana Society for the Prevention of Cruelty to Animals did more for its 263 stray pets than the sheriff did for the more than 6,500 men, women and children left in his care." Gusman disputed the report; he acknowledged the loss of electricity and non-functioning toilets but denied that inmates went unfed, saying they had food from the prison and military MREs. He repeatedly rejected inmate accounts, at one point telling a reporter, "Don't rely on crackheads, cowards and criminals to say what the story is." Gusman maintained that the evacuation of more than 6,000 inmates, deputies and their families was accomplished without loss of life or major injury, and a later Justice Department findings letter commended him for the Katrina evacuation.

=== Rebuilding the jail and FEMA funding ===
Rebuilding the flood-damaged jail with Federal Emergency Management Agency money became a central and contentious project of Gusman's tenure. The initial post-Katrina plan was to rebuild the complex at roughly its former size—about 5,832 beds—using FEMA funds; a set of plans Gusman sent to an architect in 2007 envisioned an 8,000-bed facility, and by 2010 he was pushing for a 4,300-bed jail. Facing opposition from the Orleans Parish Prison Reform Coalition and other reformers, the New Orleans City Council voted on February 3, 2011, to cap the new jail at 1,438 beds.

Prison Legal News reported in September 2012 that FEMA had "committed approximately $114 million" to the new jail complex, comprising $50.4 million toward construction of the 1,438-bed jail and $63.6 million for a 163,000-square-foot kitchen and warehouse building. The kitchen and warehouse building opened first, followed by the Orleans Justice Center, a 1,438-bed "direct supervision" jail with an intake and processing center that opened in September 2015 at a cost of roughly $145 million. The office also operated a Temporary Detention Center.

=== Phase III and the FEMA money held up by the city ===
The most protracted dispute concerned a "Phase III" special-needs and mental-health facility. Gusman first proposed Phase III in 2014 as a roughly 160,000-square-foot building with a capacity variously described as 380 to 764 beds; critics viewed it as a backdoor expansion of the jail, while the other parties to the consent decree—the Justice Department and lawyers for the inmate class—supported a facility to house detainees with acute mental illness, which neither the 2011 zoning ordinance nor the design of the Orleans Justice Center had accommodated. The design was ultimately scaled down to an 89-bed mental-health annex with an infirmary, laundry and visitation area, to stand between the Orleans Justice Center and the kitchen–warehouse building.

The city, which funds and would build the facility, shifted position repeatedly. Mayor Mitch Landrieu's administration agreed to build Phase III in 2017, but Mayor LaToya Cantrell's administration came out against it, arguing that it was unnecessary and too expensive given a declining jail population and pandemic-era revenue shortfalls, and instead proposed retrofitting a floor of the existing jail; the City Planning Commission approved that retrofit alternative in November 2021. The other parties to the consent decree, along with U.S. District Judge Lance Africk and U.S. Magistrate Judge Michael North, rejected the city's arguments; Africk first ordered the city and sheriff to proceed with the facility in 2019, and the Fifth Circuit heard the city's appeal in March 2022, where Judge Carl Stewart questioned the city's cost claims.

The facility's projected cost rose sharply, and the parties disputed the causes. For several years the city estimated Phase III at $51 million, of which FEMA was expected to cover between $36 million and $40 million—money originally pledged to replace the jail's Templeman II building, which had been damaged by Katrina. Attorneys for the Cantrell administration argued the FEMA funds fell about $15 million short of the $51 million cost; the DOJ and the compliance director countered that the money came from a roughly $70 million pot of federal funds, of which nearly $50 million remained. A key risk was that the city's projected completion date of January 2024 would fall past a FEMA deadline requiring Katrina-related projects to be "substantially completed"—a deadline reported to fall in the summer of 2023, the eighteenth anniversary of the storm—which, if missed, could cost New Orleans taxpayers the FEMA share. Judge North warned the city "in the strongest possible terms" against any further delays, "including ... any suggested delays the City might later suggest are warranted by its inability (or unwillingness) to allocate funding to cover the 'gap' between the FEMA funds ... and the actual cost of construction," and in April 2022 he and the other parties rejected the city's claim that FEMA itself was responsible for the delays.

By January 2023 the city had raised its estimate to $71 million, but the single bid received came in at $89 million, forcing a rebid because FEMA rules require at least two bids. By early 2024 the total was reported at about $109 million. To close the gap, the Cantrell administration reallocated more than $26 million in 2023 from other planned capital projects—including an emergency operations center, public libraries and a recreation center—and later reallocated roughly $32 million, bypassing City Council approval; an Orleans Parish Civil District Court judge, Kern Reese, upheld that action in November 2023, finding the city had been placed "on the horns of a dilemma." Construction, by the contractor McDonnel, was repeatedly stalled after Gusman left office, including by Sheriff Susan Hutson's refusal to sign a cooperative-endeavor agreement and by a 2023 legal challenge from the sheriff's office; both Hutson and Cantrell opposed the project. In September 2026, Sheriff Michelle Woodfork said the 89-bed Phase III wing was expected to open by late November 2026.

=== Justice Department investigation and consent decree ===
The United States Department of Justice Civil Rights Division notified Gusman on February 12, 2008, that it would investigate conditions at Orleans Parish Prison under the Civil Rights of Institutionalized Persons Act. In a findings letter dated September 11, 2009, acting assistant attorney general Loretta King concluded that inmates were "not adequately protected from harm," did "not receive adequate mental health care, including proper suicide prevention," and faced "serious risks posed by inadequate environmental and sanitation conditions"; the letter nonetheless commended Gusman for structurally rebuilding the facilities and for the Katrina evacuation. The Justice Department issued a second findings letter in April 2012.

In April 2012 the Southern Poverty Law Center filed a class action, Jones v. Gusman, on behalf of prisoners, alleging pervasive violence, sexual assaults and neglect and citing several deaths, including that of Cayne Miceli in 2009. During fairness hearings that began April 1, 2013, evidence included amateur videos—shot in 2009 in the now-closed House of Detention—showing inmates using drugs, drinking beer, gambling and handling a loaded handgun inside the jail, and one inmate filmed walking on Bourbon Street; the videos, released during the hearing, drew national coverage. Gusman, in a statement, called the House of Detention "a city-owned building in a state of disrepair and abhorrent lack of proper security measures."

On June 6, 2013, Judge Africk approved the consent decree, writing that it was "the only way to overcome the years of stagnation that have permitted OPP to remain an indelible stain on the community." The decree required wholesale operational changes and an independent monitor, and the parties agreed to redesign the jail then under construction to accommodate prisoners with mental-health needs; the City of New Orleans objected that the decree would cost it as much as $22 million to $35 million while it was also funding a separate consent decree over the New Orleans Police Department, but Africk rejected the city's arguments.

=== Compliance director period ===
The plaintiffs and the Justice Department moved on April 25, 2016, to hold Gusman in contempt and appoint a receiver. Rather than accept full receivership, Gusman entered a stipulated agreement in June 2016 ceding broad authority to an independent compliance director who would control hiring, firing, budget and operations and report to the court. Gary Maynard served as the first compliance director from October 2016 until he resigned in early 2018 after monitors called the facility "critically unsafe"; Darnley R. Hodge Sr. then led the jail from February 19, 2018. On August 5, 2020, after none of the other parties objected, Judge Africk granted Gusman's motion to terminate the compliance-director position and restore his day-to-day control, though the court cautioned that "significant incidents of violence" remained and that federal supervision would continue. The jail remained under the consent decree when Gusman left office in 2022.

=== Deaths, violence and litigation ===
The jail's problems generated repeated wrongful-death and civil-rights litigation. Cayne Miceli, a woman with a history of panic attacks and depression, died in 2009 after being placed in five-point restraints; her death was among those cited in the Jones complaint. After the Orleans Justice Center opened, deaths continued: Cleveland Tumblin, a 63-year-old man with bipolar disorder and schizophrenia, hanged himself in a shower stall in March 2016, and his family sued Gusman, jail warden Chaz Ruiz and the medical contractor Correct Care Solutions, alleging "an inexcusable disregard" for inmates' medical needs. In October 2016, 15-year-old Jaquin Thomas—held in the adult jail while charged as an adult with second-degree murder—died by suicide; a deputy had not checked on him as required, and Judge Africk remarked that "15-year-olds should not be hanging themselves in the jail." Thomas's death intensified scrutiny of the practice of holding juveniles in the adult jail, which the city later curtailed. Six people died in custody in 2017, including Colby Crawford, 23, who overdosed in February after being recorded injecting cocaine; Jermaine Johnson, 23, who hanged himself in May; and Terry Smith, 71, a former Marine who died in August, years after a beating at the old jail that Africk had cited in the 2013 consent decree. The Lens reported that 22 people died in the city's custody between 2014 and early 2024, many by suicide or overdose.

=== Legal conflict with the City of New Orleans ===
The Metairie law firm Usry, Weeks & Matthews, also styled Usry & Weeks, had represented the sheriff's office for decades before Gusman took office and kept the work under him. Its lawyers, among them name partner T. Allen Usry, Freeman R. Matthews, Craig Frosch and Blake J. Arcuri, handled inmate suits, employment matters and the federal jail litigation. An investigation by WVUE Fox 8 reporter Lee Zurik found that Gusman was paying the firm about $1.7 million a year, invoiced as $65,000 twice a month, with no written contract and no itemized bills. Tulane law professor Joel Friedman told the station, "Something isn't exactly kosher here," and said the people of the city "should be shocked." Gusman said in a statement that the capped fee saved the office at least half of what hourly billing would cost. Fox 8 reported that in 2011 the office had paid outside attorneys, including Usry, Weeks & Matthews, almost $1.9 million, while the neighboring Jefferson Parish sheriff, billed at $120 an hour, spent $700,000. A new contract later required the firm to bill by the hour and itemize its work; Jed Horne of The Lens wrote in 2015 that it "capped the monthly fee at $65,000, cutting the firm's annual take in half."

The office's discretionary spending and its auditor also came under scrutiny. The Lens reported in 2011 that deputies paid $1 into a Sheriff's Detail Fund for every hour they worked on private security details, and that Gusman used the fund to write checks to "cash" and to pay for alcohol and gifts, spending the Louisiana Attorney General's office had said in an opinion was an illegal use of public money. In July 2013 New Orleans Inspector General Ed Quatrevaux filed an ethics complaint over a conflict of interest involving the office's auditor, Albert J. "Joey" Richard III of Postlethwaite & Netterville, who was also Gusman's campaign treasurer. Legislative Auditor Daryl Purpera reviewed the 2012 audit and said nothing in it indicated a departure from government auditing standards.

The largest case of his tenure was Jones v. Gusman (No. 2:12-cv-00859, E.D. La.), filed by jail detainees in 2012. The United States Department of Justice intervened, and the case produced the 2013 consent decree on conditions at Orleans Parish Prison that U.S. District Judge Lance Africk approved. For that case and for his disputes with Mayor Mitch Landrieu's administration, Gusman hired James M. Williams of the Metairie firm Chehardy, Sherman, Williams as private counsel. The firm's website says Williams represented the sheriff against the Justice Department in 2016 and "averted a federal takeover" of the jail. Court filings list Williams, Usry, Matthews, Arcuri and Inemesit U. O'Boyle among Gusman's counsel. The monitoring team appointed under the decree, approved in September 2013, was led by Susan W. McCampbell, with monitors for corrections, medical care, sanitation and mental health.

Under state law the city pays for the jail, and the two sides fought over how much. The city, represented by City Attorney Sharonda R. Williams, opposed approval of the consent decree, arguing that it could not afford the cost, which Gusman's lawyers put at up to $23 million a year. In April 2013, after the release of a video shot by inmates inside the jail, Landrieu asked the court to appoint a federal receiver; the motion was dismissed without prejudice. Williams also argued that Gusman had negotiated his $83 million medical-care contract with Correct Care Solutions illegally, but Africk declined to void it in May 2015.

Until 2014 the city paid for the jail through a per-diem rate set under Hamilton v. Schiro, a class action filed in 1969; the rate, $22.39 per inmate per day, had last been raised in 2003. Gusman knew the system from the other side. While working for the mayor's office before he became sheriff, he had accused Sheriff Charles Foti of releasing inmates just after midnight so that the office could bill the city for an extra day. In October 2005, with City Hall laying off thousands of workers after Hurricane Katrina, Gusman filed a motion in federal court to collect more than $3 million in jail bills the city owed for July and August. Mayor Ray Nagin called the move "incredibly insensitive and mean-spirited." Gusman answered that with his inmates evacuated and the per-diem payments gone with them, he still had fixed costs to cover. He moved in 2012 to reopen Hamilton and raise the rate, dropped the effort in 2013, and the per-diem system gave way to a fixed appropriation in the 2014 budget. In 2015 he sued the city over funding in Gusman v. New Orleans City (Nos. 15-5235 and 15-5236, E.D. La.), and the city sought to keep the cases in state court. A notice to the class in the consent-decree case pointed out that, while the plaintiffs and the Justice Department had not sued the city, "Sheriff Gusman has sued the City, asserting that the City must provide additional funds for the jail."

After the Justice Department again asked for a receiver in April 2016, Gusman, the city and the plaintiffs agreed in June 2016 to a court-appointed compliance director with "final authority" over jail operations, at a salary of $150,000 to $200,000 a year. Gusman signed the stipulated order and, in 2017, the plan for the mental-health building known as Phase III. The city later tried to get out of building Phase III. The United States Court of Appeals for the Fifth Circuit ruled against it in June 2022, and a second city appeal was dismissed for lack of jurisdiction in 2024.

Wrongful-death and civil-rights suits were a constant. In 2010 a federal jury awarded two men $650,000 over their detention after Hurricane Katrina; Matthews defended the sheriff. The mother of Colby Crawford, who died of an overdose in the jail in 2017, sued in Crawford v. Gusman (No. 17-13397, E.D. La.), and in 2018 a Correct Care Solutions nurse filed a whistleblower suit saying she had been fired after raising concerns about the care of a detainee who died. The FEMA-funded rebuild brought its own bills. The Lens reported in 2011 that the kitchen and warehouse project, at "in excess of $80 million," had run "50 percent over budget," leaving the office "on the hook for $17.8 million in optional extras" that FEMA would not pay for. At a City Council budget hearing in November 2021 the office reported that it was "named in more than a dozen open federal lawsuits"; reporters had earlier found that it "paid out nearly $2 million for legal services with outside firms" in 2015.

=== Programs and initiatives ===
Gusman promoted himself as an advocate of rehabilitation and education. His office established a Day Reporting Center for probation and parole violators, a regional re-entry program aimed at reducing recidivism, and education dorms and learning centers. In August 2016 the Travis Hill School—named for the New Orleans musician Travis "Trumpet Black" Hill, who had been incarcerated as a teenager—opened inside the city's juvenile detention center, and a second campus opened inside the Orleans Justice Center in 2017; the schools are operated under a contract between the Orleans Parish School Board and the Center for Educational Excellence in Alternative Settings and offer full high-school credits and diplomas. The Louisiana Department of Education later recognized Travis Hill as a "Louisiana Comeback Campus" for gains in reading and math. The Orleans Justice Center was designed on a "direct supervision" model, although chronic staffing shortages limited its implementation.

Over Gusman's tenure the number of people incarcerated fell dramatically. Gusman said he had "reduced our population of incarcerated persons from nearly 6,300 to under 900 by ending the agreement to house state prisoners," a downsizing that critics attributed largely to reforms by police, courts and city leaders—including the 1,438-bed cap set by the mayor's jail-size task force, on which Gusman sat—and, later, to the COVID-19 pandemic, rather than to the sheriff alone. New Orleans joined the first cohort of the MacArthur Foundation's Safety and Justice Challenge in 2015.

=== Hurricanes and the COVID-19 pandemic ===
After Katrina, Gusman purchased backup generators and adopted a policy of busing inmates out of the jail before major storms, a change widely presented as a contrast to 2005. Ahead of Hurricane Ida in 2021, the sheriff's office relocated 835 people from the jail to prisons on higher ground, with many sent to the Louisiana State Penitentiary at Angola.

During the COVID-19 pandemic, the jail population fell to about 818 by late April 2020, from more than 1,000 in early March, aided by Gusman's March 26, 2020, letter asking the Orleans Parish Criminal District Court to release non-violent detainees. Because the jail was then under the compliance director, day-to-day pandemic decisions rested with Darnley Hodge; the jail's medical provider, Wellpath, developed a screening protocol, and the facility began mass testing in April 2020. Four OPSO deputies died of COVID-19, and no inmate deaths were directly attributed to the virus.

=== Relations with city government ===
Because the sheriff runs the jail while the city funds it, Gusman's relationships with successive mayors were often strained. He clashed with Mayor Mitch Landrieu for years over the jail's budget and the cost of the consent decree; Landrieu called the reform bill a "blank check" and criticized Gusman's stewardship, though the two later settled aspects of the budget dispute. He also served under mayors Ray Nagin and LaToya Cantrell, whose administration opposed the Phase III facility.

=== Later terms and 2021 defeat ===
In the February 1, 2014, primary Gusman nearly won outright with 40,557 votes (48.9 percent), against 23,676 (28.6 percent) for former sheriff Charles Foti, who attempted a comeback; in the March 15, 2014, runoff Gusman prevailed with 40,068 votes (66.7 percent) to Foti's 19,996 (33.3 percent). He was re-elected without opposition in 2017 after qualifying closed on July 14, 2017.

In 2021 Gusman sought a fifth full term against former New Orleans Independent Police Monitor Susan Hutson, who ran as a criminal-justice reformer opposed to expanding the jail. In the November 13, 2021, primary Gusman led a five-candidate field with 35,903 votes (47.7 percent) to Hutson's 26,666 (35.4 percent), followed by Christopher Williams (6,651), Janet Hays (3,230) and Quentin Brown (2,791), but fell short of a majority. Hutson was endorsed by District Attorney Jason Williams and progressive groups and received a $200,000 contribution from Mark Zuckerberg. In the December 11, 2021, runoff Hutson defeated Gusman with 31,975 votes (53.3 percent) to his 27,987 (46.7 percent), becoming the first woman and first Black woman elected sheriff in Louisiana. Gusman left office when Hutson was sworn in on May 2, 2022.

== Post-sheriff career ==
After leaving office, Gusman returned to the private practice of law. He returned to public attention after the escape of ten inmates from the Orleans Justice Center in May 2025. In interviews he called the security failure alarming and defended the design and construction of the jail he had built, disputing Sheriff Hutson's characterization that the facility had been inadequately built, and he said he was considering a run to regain the office in the 2025 election. Hutson was defeated in the October 11, 2025, election by former interim police chief Michelle Woodfork, who took office in 2026.

== Electoral history ==
Complete official vote totals for the 2004, 2006 and 2010 Orleans Parish sheriff's elections were not available at the time of writing; the candidates in those contests are listed below.

2004 Orleans Parish Criminal Sheriff, special election (primary November 2, 2004; runoff December 4, 2004): Marlin Gusman (elected); William Hunter (interim sheriff, runoff opponent); Ira Thomas (fourth in the primary); and others.

2006 Orleans Parish criminal sheriff (primary April 22, 2006): Marlin Gusman (re-elected); Gerald DeSalvo; and others.

2010 Orleans Parish sheriff (February 6, 2010): Marlin Gusman elected as the first sheriff of the consolidated office.

2014 Orleans Parish sheriff: Primary (February 1, 2014)—Marlin Gusman 40,557 (48.9%); Charles Foti 23,676 (28.6%); with Ira Thomas and Quentin Brown also on the ballot. Runoff (March 15, 2014)—Gusman 40,068 (66.7%); Foti 19,996 (33.3%).

2017 Orleans Parish sheriff: Gusman re-elected without opposition.

2021 Orleans Parish sheriff: Primary (November 13, 2021)—Marlin Gusman 35,903 (47.7%); Susan Hutson 26,666 (35.4%); Christopher Williams 6,651 (8.8%); Janet Hays 3,230 (4.3%); Quentin Brown 2,791 (3.7%). Runoff (December 11, 2021)—Hutson 31,975 (53.3%); Gusman 27,987 (46.7%).

== Personal life ==
Gusman is married to Renee Gusman; as of 2023 the couple had been married 45 years and had two children. He is a practicing Catholic and has received the Order of St. Louis from the Archdiocese of New Orleans. He has served on the Allstate Sugar Bowl Committee and on the boards of Boys Town of Louisiana, Longue Vue House & Gardens, the Health Education Alliance of Louisiana and the YMCA of Greater New Orleans.

== Honors ==
In 2023 Gusman was named Jesuit High School's Alumnus of the Year.

== See also ==
- Orleans Parish Prison
- Orleans Justice Center
- Jones v. Gusman
- 2025 New Orleans jailbreak

Political offices
Preceded by Charles Foti	Orleans Parish Criminal Sheriff; 2004–2010	Office abolished (consolidated into Orleans Parish Sheriff)
New office	Sheriff of Orleans Parish; 2010–2022	Succeeded by Susan Hutson
