= 2025 New Orleans elections =

Local elections in Louisiana

- October 11, 2025 (first round); November 15, 2025 (runoff)

Elections were held in New Orleans, Louisiana, and the Orleans Parish on October 11, 2025. In elections where no candidate received 50% of the vote, runoff elections will be held on November 15.

== Parish Assessor ==
=== Candidates ===
==== Declared ====
- Coreygerard Dowden, advisor (Independent)
- Casius Pealer, architect and professor (Democratic)
- Earl Schmitt, attorney (Republican)
- Erroll Williams, incumbent assessor (Democratic)

=== Results ===
2025 Orleans Parish Assessor election
Party	Candidate	Votes	%
Democratic	Erroll Williams (incumbent)	61,631	61.30
Democratic	Casius Pealer	28,256	28.11
Republican	Earl Schmitt	8,422	8.38
Independent	Coreygerard Dowden	2,227	2.22
Total votes		100,536	100.00

== Parish Coroner ==
Incumbent Democratic coroner Dwight McKenna was re-elected unopposed.

== Parish Sheriff ==
=== Candidates ===
==== Declared ====
- Susan Hutson, incumbent sheriff (Democratic)
- Ernest Lee, former deputy (Republican)
- Bob Murray, businessman (Democratic)
- Julian Parker, retired criminal district court judge (Democratic)
- Edwin Shorty Jr., constable of the 2nd City Court (Democratic)
- Michelle Woodfork, New Orleans Police Department employee and interim superintendent (2022–2023) (Democratic)

=== Polling ===
Poll source	Date(s) administered	Sample size (Note: Key: A – all adults RV – registered voters LV – likely voters V – unclear)	Margin of error	Susan Hutson	Ernest Lee	Bob Murray	Julian Parker	Edwin Shorty	Michelle Woodfork	Undecided
University of New Orleans	September 20–24, 2025	409 (LV)	± 4.8%	13%	1%	1%	1%	9%	43%	33%
Mason Dixon (Note: Poll commissioned by WVUE-TV)	September 8–10, 2025	625 (RV)	± 4.0%	10%	9%	2%	1%	8%	45%	25%
Faucheux Strategies (Note: Poll commissioned by the New Orleans Crime Coalition)	May 27 – June 4, 2025	638 (RV)	± 3.78%	13%	–	–	–	9%	32%	46%
JMC Analytics (R) (Note: Poll commissioned by a PAC not affiliated with any candidate)	May 27–28, 2025	500 (LV)	± 4.4%	12%	–	–	3%	9%	35%	42%

=== Results ===
2025 Orleans Sheriff election
Party	Candidate	Votes	%
Democratic	Michelle Woodfork	54,019	52.91
Democratic	Edwin Shorty Jr.	21,199	20.76
Democratic	Susan Hutson (incumbent)	17,469	17.11
Republican	Ernesteayo Lee	4,614	4.52
Democratic	Julian Parker	2,431	2.38
Democratic	Robert Murray	2,369	2.32
Total votes		102,101	100.00

== City Council ==
=== At-large position 1 ===
==== Candidates ====
===== Declared =====
- Delisha Boyd, state representative from the 102nd district (Democratic)
- Matthew Hill, perennial candidate (Republican)
- Matthew Willard, state representative from the 97th district (Democratic)

==== Results ====
2025 New Orleans City Council election, at-large position 1
Party	Candidate	Votes	%
Democratic	Matthew Willard	58,903	59.35
Democratic	Delisha Boyd	30,957	31.19
Republican	Matthew Hill	9,388	9.46
Total votes		99,248	100.00

=== At-large position 2 ===
==== Candidates ====
===== Declared =====
- Kenneth Cutno, candidate for city council in 2017 and 2021 (Democratic)
- Gregory Manning, pastor (Democratic)
- Jean-Paul Morrell, incumbent councilor (Democratic)

==== Results ====
2025 New Orleans City Council election, at-large position 2
Party	Candidate	Votes	%
Democratic	Jean-Paul J. Morrell (incumbent)	65,198	65.78
Democratic	Gregory Manning	23,305	23.51
Democratic	Kenneth Cutno	10,618	10.71
Total votes		99,121	100.00

=== District A ===
==== Candidates ====
===== Declared =====
- Holly Friedman, Orleans Parish New Orleans District Attorney's Office director of open-source intelligence (Democratic)
- Aimee McCarron, budget and policy director for outgoing councilor Joe Giarrusso (Democratic)
- Alex Mossing, teacher (Democratic)
- Bob Murrell, software developer (Independent)
- Bridget Neal, businesswoman (Republican)

===== Declined =====
- Joe Giarrusso, incumbent councilor

==== Results ====
2025 New Orleans City Council election, district A
Party	Candidate	Votes	%
Democratic	Holly Friedman	8,589	38.73
Democratic	Aimee McCarron	7,170	32.33
Independent	Robert Murrell	3,002	13.54
Republican	Bridget Neal	2,048	9.23
Democratic	Alex Mossing	1,369	6.17
Total votes		22,178	100.00

==== Runoff ====
===== Results =====
2025 New Orleans City Council runoff election, district A
Party	Candidate	Votes	%
Democratic	Aimee McCarron	8,068	57.73
Democratic	Holly Friedman	5,907	42.27
Total votes		13,975	100.00

=== District B ===
Incumbent Democratic councilor Lesli Harris was re-elected unopposed.

=== District C ===
==== Candidates ====
===== Declared =====
- Eliot Barron (Green)
- Kelsey Foster, businesswoman (Democratic)
- Jackson Kimbrell, construction project manager (Independent)
- Freddie King III, incumbent councilor (Democratic)

==== Results ====
2025 New Orleans City Council election, district C
Party	Candidate	Votes	%
Democratic	Freddie King III (incumbent)	12,195	63.78
Democratic	Kelsey Foster	5,715	29.89
Independent	Jackson Kimbrell	757	3.96
Green	Eliot Barron	454	2.37
Total votes		19,121	100.00

=== District D ===
==== Candidates ====
===== Declared =====
- Belden Batiste, community activist (Democratic)
- Eugene Green, incumbent councilor (Democratic)
- Leilani Heno, small business owner (Independent)

==== Results ====
2025 New Orleans City Council election, district D
Party	Candidate	Votes	%
Democratic	Eugene Green	14,872	66.90
Democratic	Belden Batiste	4,609	20.73
Independent	Leilani Heno	2,748	12.36
Total votes		22,229	100.00

=== District E ===
==== Candidates ====
===== Declared =====
- Richard Bell Sr., reverend (Democratic)
- Kimberly Burbank (Democratic) (unofficially withdrawn)
- Danyelle Christmas, activist (Democratic)
- Jason Hughes, state representative from the 100th district (Democratic)
- Nathaniel Jones (Independent)
- Willie Morgan (Democratic)
- Cyndi Nguyen, former councilor (Democratic)
- Gavin Richard (Independent)
- Jonathan Roberts, educator (Independent)

==== Results ====
2025 New Orleans City Council election, district E
Party	Candidate	Votes	%
Democratic	Cyndi Nguyen	8,709	45.67
Democratic	Jason Hughes	6,910	36.24
Democratic	Kimberly Burbank	790	4.14
Democratic	Willie Morgan	778	4.08
Democratic	Richard Bell Sr.	767	4.02
Democratic	Danyelle Christmas	605	3.17
Independent	Gavin Richard	177	0.93
Independent	Jonathan Roberts	172	0.90
Independent	Nathaniel Jones	160	0.84
Total votes		19,068	100.00

==== Runoff ====
===== Results =====
2025 New Orleans City Council runoff election, district E
Party	Candidate	Votes	%
Democratic	Jason Hughes	7,725	61.47
Democratic	Cyndi Nguyen	4,843	38.53
Total votes		12,568	100.00

== Notes ==
Partisan clients
