= Thornton Butler =

American politician

Thornton Butler was an American state legislator in Louisiana. He lived in New Orleans and served in the Louisiana House of Representatives.

Butler represented the fourth district of the Orleans Parish. He took office on January 22, 1874 after a protracted election dispute. He served until 1880.

== See also ==
- African American officeholders from the end of the Civil War until before 1900
