= Africk =

Africk is a surname. Notable people with the surname include:

- Lance Africk (born 1951), American judge
- Michael Africk (born 1975), American singer-songwriter, record producer, and entrepreneur
