= 2025 New Orleans jailbreak =

Jail escape in New Orleans, Louisiana, U.S.

- CCTV footage of the inmates escaping
- Date: May 16, 2025, manhunt has ended after the capture of Groves
- Time: 12:23 – 1:01 a.m. (CDT)
- Location: Orleans Parish Prison, New Orleans, Louisiana
- Type: Jail escape, manhunt
- Participants: At least 10 (escapees potentially had help from jail employees)
- Outcome: All escapees captured
- Accused: 16 (1 jail employee, 1 jail inmate, 14 acquaintances) (Note: Attributed to multiple sources:)

On May 16, 2025, ten inmates of the Orleans Parish Prison, located in New Orleans, Louisiana, escaped through a hole in the wall behind a toilet. Six of the ten inmates were charged with murder or attempted murder, and all inmates have since been recaptured as of October 8. Nine of the inmates are pre-trial.

== Escape ==
At 12:23 a.m., inmates at the Orleans Parish Prison, who managed to escape their cells due to some faulty locks, began tampering with a locked sliding cell door for about 20 minutes before pulling it off its tracks and gaining entry into the cell. Once inside, the group ripped off a toilet and sink unit in the cell, and cut off horizontal bars from a hole behind the toilet that was used to connect pipes. By doing this, they were successfully able to escape. Above the hole where the inmates escaped from, the inmates scribbled graffiti and various obscene messages, among them "To Easy LoL" and "We Innocent." Authorities stated the guard assigned with watching their cell pod was away getting food at the time of the escape.

After squeezing through the hole, the group fled through a loading dock, scaled a wall, and then ran across the Interstate 10 highway. By 1:30 a.m., the group was outside the jail. At 8:30 a.m., roughly seven hours after the escape, the inmates were discovered missing during a routine head count.

Orleans Parish Sheriff Susan Hutson noted that there was a chance that someone who worked at the jail had helped the men escape, saying “It’s almost impossible, not completely, but almost impossible for anybody to get out of this facility without help". A jail employee who was monitoring surveillance had reportedly witnessed the escape but did not report it to deputies. Three employees at the jail have been suspended without pay while officials investigate.

Prison officials early on suspected the escapees had inside help to escape. On May 20, 2025, a jail maintenance worker was arrested and accused of turning off the water in certain cells in order to aid the escapees in removing the toilet. Three additional jail employees were suspended without pay pending the outcome of the investigation. On May 21, 2025, two women were arrested for aiding the escapees and charged with being accessories after the fact. At least one of the women was in communication with an escapee prior to the escape. Late on May 22, 2025, another woman was arrested for being an accomplice. As of Friday, May 23, 2025, seven people had been arrested for aiding the escapees: one jail employee, one jail inmate, and five acquaintances. On the weekend of May 24–25, 2025, four people who were family or acquaintances of escapee Lenton Vanburen were arrested for assisting him.

== Capture ==
Three of the men were captured on May 16, 2025, and were taken to the Louisiana State Penitentiary via helicopter. Gary Price was captured on May 19, 2025, and Cory Boyd was captured a day later. Lenton Vanburen was captured on May 26, 2025, in Baton Rouge. Leo Tate and Jermaine Donald were also captured on May 26 in Walker County, Texas.

Louisiana State Police said in a statement that one of the inmates, Kendall Myles, was found under a car at a hotel garage in the French Quarter. This was the third time inmate Antoine Massey had escaped from a jail since 2007, and he was also ineligible for electronic ankle monitoring due to a history of cutting the devices off. Massey was captured on June 27, 2025. During his time on the run, Massey published media on Instagram in which he claimed innocence. Though police were able to locate and raid the home that Massey was shown in, the convict was gone on arrival.

The final inmate, Derrick Groves, was captured on October 8, nearly five months after the escape, in Atlanta, Georgia.

== Perpetrators ==
In total, 26 individuals were charged with crimes related to the escape. In addition to the 10 inmates, 16 accessories were charged with assisting the escapees. Many of the accessories were either employees of the prison or relatives of the inmates.

=== Escapees ===
The escapees' ages ranged from 20 to 43. Several have been charged with murder. Others were charged with aggravated assault with a firearm, false imprisonment with a weapon, armed robbery with a firearm, and domestic abuse.

The apprehended escapees are: (Note: Attributed to multiple sources:)

Name (age)	Date apprehended	Notes
Derrick Groves (28)	October 8, 2025	Convicted of second-degree murder
Antoine Massey (33)	June 27, 2025	Charged with domestic abuse involving strangulation, along with automotive theft
Jermaine Donald (43)	May 26, 2025	Charged with second-degree murder, aggravated battery, and illegal possession of a firearm
Leo Tate (32)	May 26, 2025	Charged with second-degree murder
Lenton Vanburen (27)	May 26, 2025	Charged with second-degree murder
Corey Boyd (20)	May 20, 2025	Charged with second-degree murder
Gary Price (21)	May 19, 2025	Charged with attempted first-degree murder, simple assault, criminal damage, domestic abuse, battery, and assault with a weapon
Dkenan Dennis (24)	May 16, 2025	Charged with armed robbery with a firearm and illegal carrying of a weapon during a crime of violence
Robert Moody (22)	May 16, 2025	Charged with attempted second-degree battery and obstruction
Kendall Myles (21)	May 16, 2025	Charged with intention to conceal a weapon, introducing contraband into a prison, and possession of contraband

=== Accessories ===
People charged with assisting the escapees (before or after):

Name (age)	Date apprehended	Notes
Darriana Burton	June 9, 2025	Accused of assisting her boyfriend, Derrick Groves
James Randolph	May 28, 2025	Accused of assisting his cousin, Lenton Vanburen, acquire a hotel room
Vi Duc Nguyen	May 28, 2025	Accused of paying for the Baton Rouge hotel room where Lenton Vanburen was arrested in
Lenton Vanburen Sr. (48)	May 27, 2025	Father of Lenton Vanburen
Lenika Vanburen (28)	May 27, 2025	Relative of Lenton Vanburen
Patricia Vanburen (18)	May 27, 2025	Relative of Lenton Vanburen
Tyshanea Randolph (27)	May 27, 2025	Charged with assisting Lenton Vanburen
Angel McKay (41)	May 27, 2025	Charged with assisting Lenton Vanburen
Diamond White (21)	May 27, 2025	Charged with "principal to aggravated escape" for the assistance of Antoine Massey
Trevon Williams	Already in custody (Charged May 24, 2025)	Charged with ten counts of simple escape
Emmitt Weber	May 23, 2025	Charged with assisting two unnamed escapees
Casey Smith (30)	May 22, 2025	Admitted her involvement to the arresting officers
Cortnie Harris (32)	May 21, 2025	Accused of being in phone contact with one of the escapees and driving two others around the city to various locations
Corvanntay Baptiste (38)	May 21, 2025	Charged with accessory after the fact to simple escape
Connie Weeden (59)	May 20, 2025	Charged with assisting grandson Jermaine Donald
Sterling Williams (33)	May 19, 2025	Jail plumber, charged with turning off water to the cell toilet which was used by the ten inmates to escape
