= SS Joe Webre =

Wooden steamship lost in 1893

Coordinates: 29.202°N 90.036°W

SS Joe Webre. was a 100' long, 40 ton, wooden steamship owned by the New Orleans and Timbalier Transportation Company, of Gretna, Louisiana that foundered at her wharf while docked at Grand Isle, Louisiana, United States in the 1893 Cheniere Caminada hurricane. The steamer was constructed in New Orleans in 1878 and lost on October 2, 1893 while under the command of Captain Michael McSweeney, the ship's engineer, George Rolf, Jr. and a skeleton crew of six onboard.

== History ==
The SS Joe Webre was a wooden commercial steamer engaged in transiting mail, cargo, vacationers and gamblers from wharves along the French Quarter of New Orleans to the gambling and beach resorts on the barrier island of Grand Isle on the Gulf of Mexico. The vessel and her destruction were mentioned by the author Kate Chopin in her novel The Awakening.

== Sinking ==
The SS Joe Webre lay at anchor at a wharf on Grand Isle when the hurricane made landfall. Heavily secured, she broke free of her lines and foundered on raised railroad tracks servicing the gambling resorts and hotels. All of the crew survived by clinging to the upper limbs of an oak tree.
