= Fisherman's Castle =

Castle in New Orleans, USA

Coordinates: 30.13727°N 89.86571°W

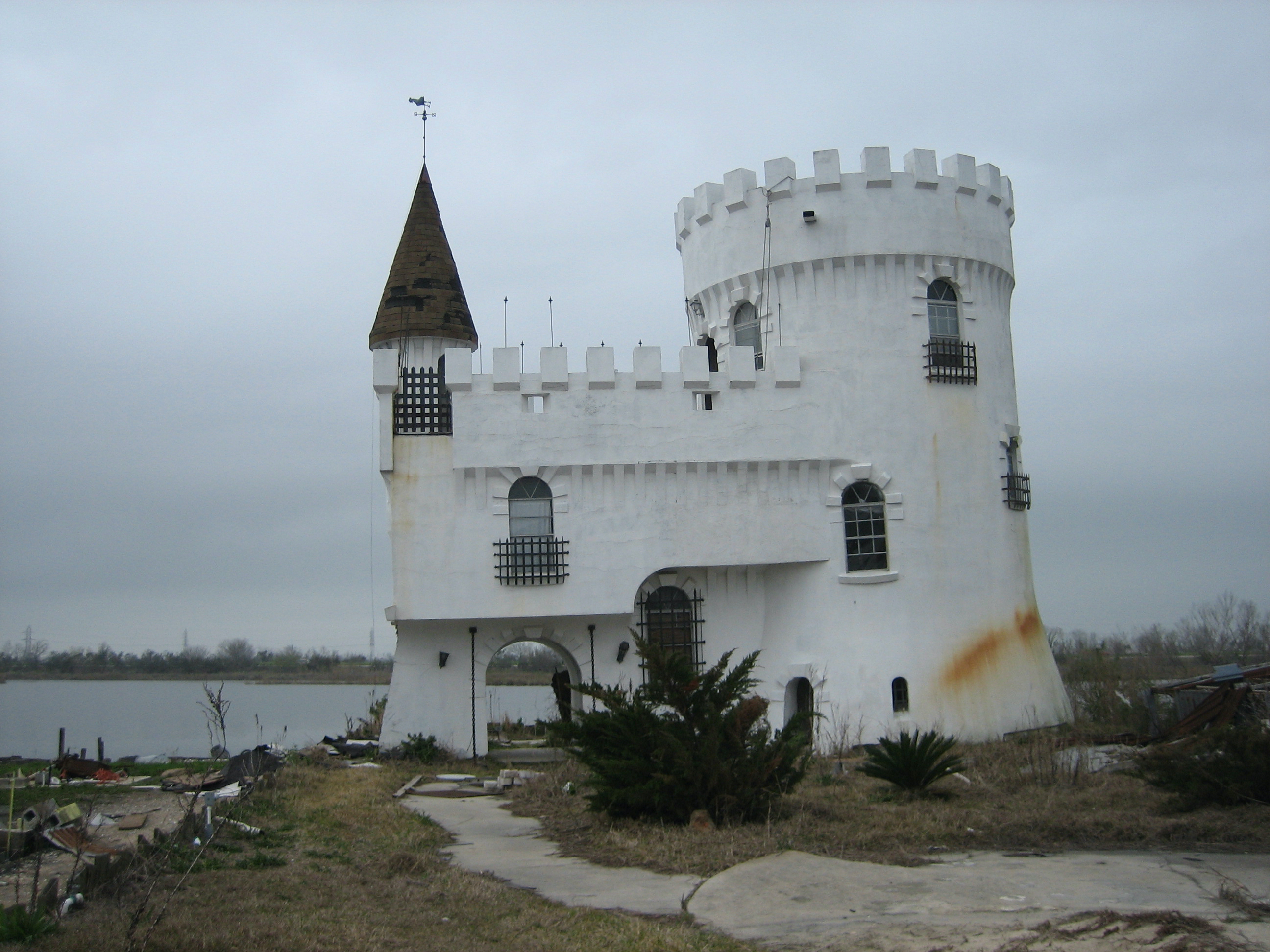
Irish Bayou Castle

Fisherman's Castle, sometimes known as Irish Bayou Castle is a 942 square-foot castle built on Irish Bayou in New Orleans near Slidell, Louisiana. Simon Villemarette built the castle in the style of a 14th-century chateau in 1981 in anticipation of the 1984 World's Fair, and it was strong enough to survive hurricanes Katrina, Isaac, and Ida, although it required repairs following Katrina. Charles and Jean Kuhl bought the castle in 1995 and sold it in 2014 being renovated the same year.
