= SS Alice McGuigin =

Coordinates: 30.057°N 89.695°W

SS Alice McGuigin was a two-masted schooner that sank in Lake Borgne off Pearlington, Mississippi, United States in the 1893 Cheniere Caminada hurricane. Under the command of Captain Wm. Delavier with five crewmembers, the schooner was owned by the Poitevent & Favre Lumber Company before lost at sea on October 2, 1893.

== History ==
The SS Alice McGuigin was a wooden commercial schooner engaged in delivering lumber and other goods to New Orleans from the ports of Pearlington and Pascagoula, Mississippi, United States. Owned by the Poitevent & Favre Lumber Company, the schooner was used to train rookie sailors employed by the company. On two occasions, the schooner was boarded by Union navy vessels assigned to the West Gulf Blockading Squadron during the Civil War and then released.

== Sinking ==
The SS Alice McGuigin sailed from the lumber yards of coastal Mississippi on Sunday October 2nd headed through the Rigolets pass between Lake Borgne and Lake Pontchartrain. During their transit, the vessel was caught in the hurricane and foundered with all lives aboard lost. The Alice McGuigan was eventually discovered by a mail boat, mast-downward in Lake Borgne, only three miles from the pier she left in Pearlington, Mississippi. Several bodies were eventually recovered including that of Captain Delavier.
