= Sea, Lake, and Overland Surge from Hurricanes =

Example of a SLOSH run

A summary of strengths and limitations of SLOSH

Sea, Lake, and Overland Surge from Hurricanes (SLOSH) is a computerized model developed by the Federal Emergency Management Agency (FEMA), United States Army Corps of Engineers (USACE), and the National Weather Service (NWS), to estimate storm surge depths resulting from historical, hypothetical, or predicted hurricanes. The model functions by taking into account a storm's pressure, size, forward speed, forecast track, wind speeds, and topographical data.

SLOSH is used to evaluate the threat from storm surge, and emergency managers use this data to determine which areas must be evacuated. SLOSH output is used by the National Hurricane Program (NHP) when conducting Hurricane Evacuation Studies as a hazard analysis tool for assisting with the creation of state and local hurricane evacuation plans or zones. SLOSH model results are combined with roadway network and traffic flow information, rainfall amounts, river flow, or wind-driven waves to determine a final analysis of at-risk areas.
