= Lake Borgne Light =

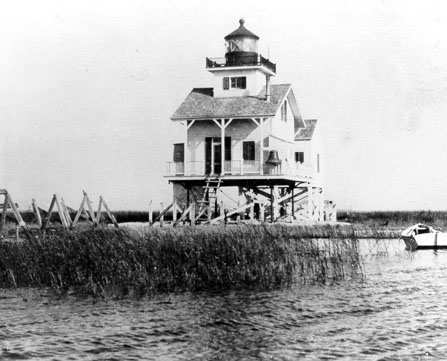
- Lake Borgne Light (USCG)
- Location: N side of entrance to Lake Borgne from the Mississippi Sound
- Coordinates: 30.175°N 89.454°W

Tower
- Height: 43 ft (13 m)
- Shape: house

Light
- First lit: 1889
- Deactivated: 1937
- Lens: fifth order Fresnel lens
- Characteristic: fixed white

The Lake Borgne Light was a lighthouse in Mississippi at the entrance to Lake Borgne on what is now Lighthouse Point, east of Heron Bay. It was built in 1889 to replace an earlier light on St. Joseph's Island further east, which was shrinking and is now completely gone. The new light sat on a screwpile foundation in the marsh and was reached by a boardwalk; it was equipped with a fifth order Fresnel lens. The house was destroyed by the 1906 Mississippi hurricane but was rebuilt; it was deactivated in 1937 and abandoned. The foundation of the light is marked as a hazard on present day charts, as the point of land has eroded further.
