= Irish Bayou =

Community in eastern New Orleans, Louisiana, USA

- Community
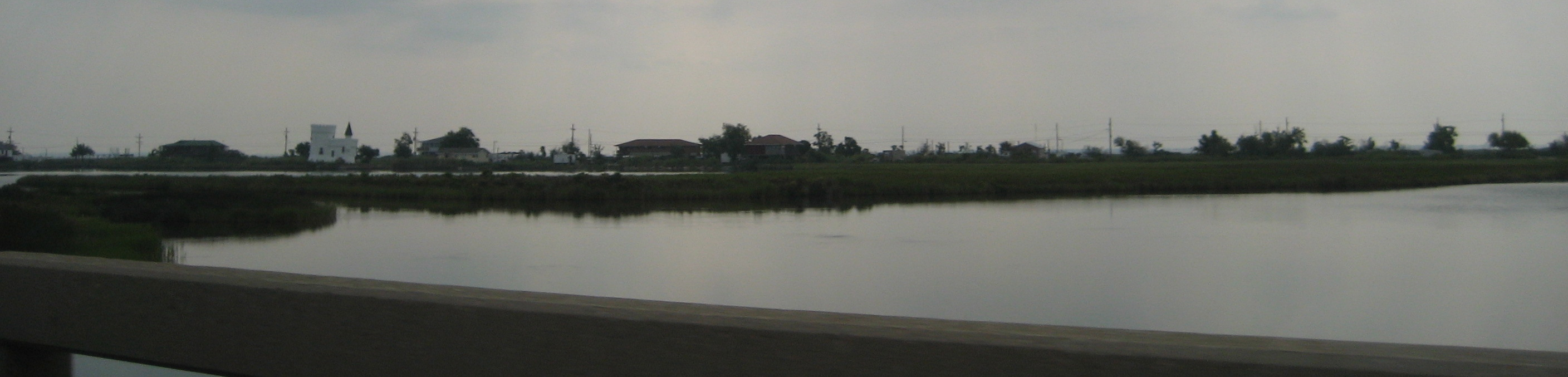
- The community of Irish Bayou as seen from Interstate 10

- Location in Louisiana Irish Bayou (the United States)
- Country: United States
- State: Louisiana
- City: New Orleans
- Elevation: 1 ft (0.30 m)
- Time zone: UTC-6 (Central (CST))
  - Summer (DST): UTC-5 (CDT)
- Area code: 504

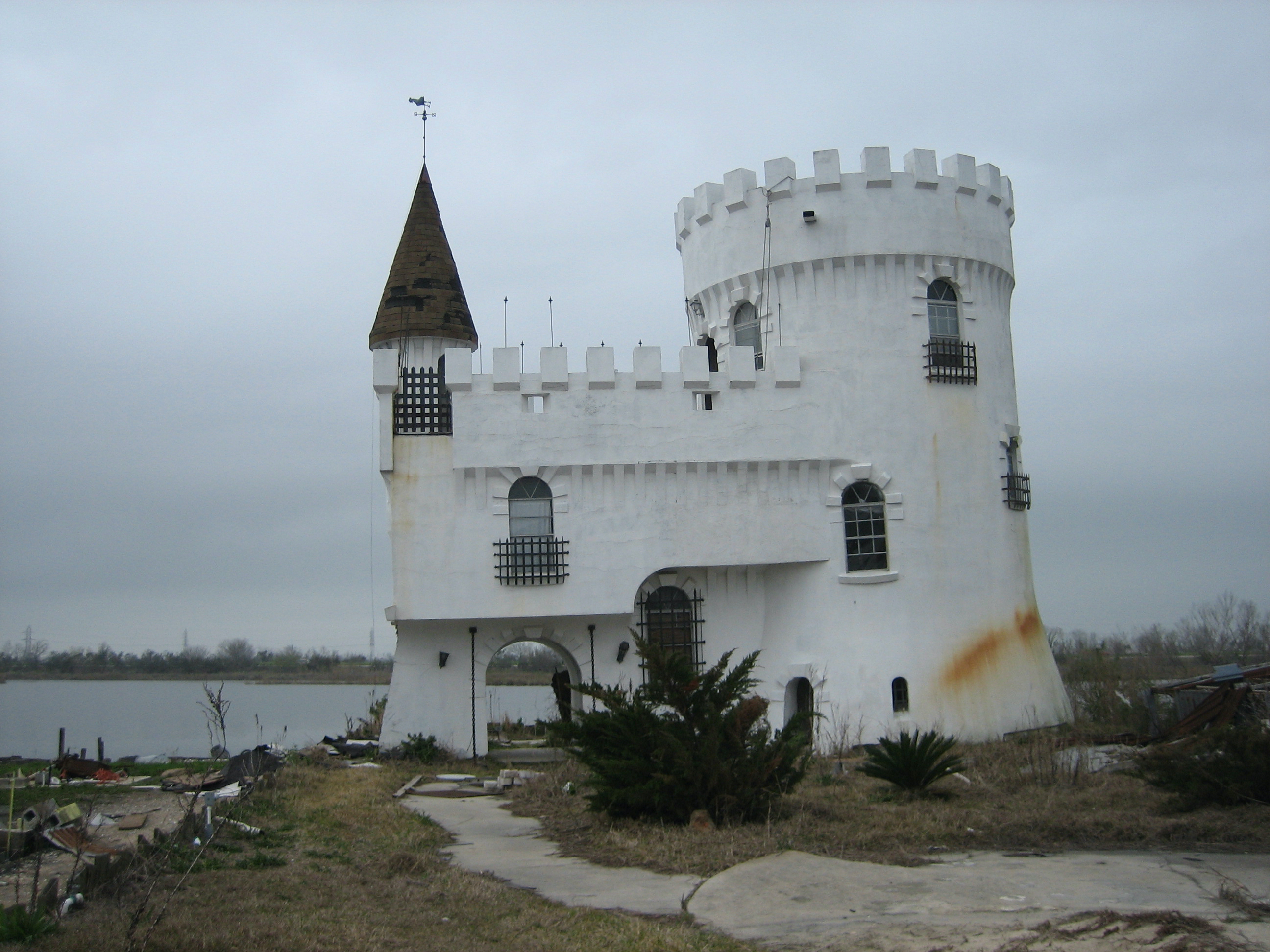
Irish Bayou Castle

Irish Bayou is a community along a body of water of the same name within the legal boundaries of the city of New Orleans, Louisiana, but separated from the rest of the city by undeveloped wetlands. It falls within a group of communities collectively known as Eastern New Orleans. It is located at latitude 30°08'30", longitude 89°51'50", with an average elevation of 1 meter. It is primarily a sport fishing community with few permanent residents.

The Irish Bayou Castle, also known as Fisherman's Castle, was built in 1981 in preparation for the 1984 Louisiana world exposition. The castle is now owned and used by Charles and Jean Khul as a hunting and fishing camp.

The origin of the community of Irish Bayou is obscure.

== In popular culture ==
The area is briefly mentioned in the 1973 James Bond film Live and Let Die during a boat chase.
