= Cheniere Caminada, Louisiana =

Ghost town in Louisiana, United States

Cheniere Caminada
- Ghost Town
- Nicknames: "Caminadaville" and "Oak ridge Cheniere"
- Location within the state of Louisiana
- Coordinates: 29°12′38.826″N 90°3′1.2636″W 29.2107845, -90.0503512
- Country: United States
- State: Louisiana
- Parish: Jefferson Parish
- Time zone: UTC-6 (Central (CST))
  - Summer (DST): UTC-5 (CDT)

Cheniere Caminada was a fishing community located in Jefferson Parish, Louisiana, that was destroyed by what is considered one of the deadliest United States hurricanes, that was unnamed but referred to as the 1893 Cheniere Caminada hurricane. The community was located west of Grand Isle, which was almost destroyed by the same hurricane.

The geographically isolated multi-ethnic fishing village of between 1,500 and 1,600 inhabitants provided seafood to restaurants in New Orleans. In the aftermath of the hurricane 779 lost their lives and over 2,000 were killed by the time the hurricane dissipated. Some residents decided to rebuild but later hurricanes took their toll on the community and there is not much remaining of the once thriving village.

== Community ==
By 1893 the geographically isolated and predominantly French speaking community had between 1,500 and 1,600 men, women, and children that included Creoles from New Orleans, Acadians from Lafourche Parish, Italian immigrants, displaced Germans and Prussians, non-Acadian French, and some of Spanish descent. The religion was predominantly Catholic and the missionary priest, Fr. Gaston d’Espinosa, served from 1883 until 1889 had established the Notre Dame du Lourdes, Our Lady of Lourdes and his successor was Fr. Ferdinand Grimeau. The community, mainly fishermen, supplied seafood and mainly oysters to New Orleans. Some fishing camps, a few residents, and some bait shops is mainly all that can be seen as the Grand Isle bridge is approached.

The island is situated west of Grand Isle, protruding into the Gulf of Mexico as the Caminada Headland, approximately 55 miles from New Orleans by boat, at the southern tip of Jefferson Parish. Aside from oysters the island also supplied sugar cane and oranges for market but the main industry was supplying oysters, shrimp and crabs to New Orleans restaurants.

== Hurricanes ==
The hurricane of 1893 devastated the community. The official count was 779 dead or almost half the population leaving very little evidence and even the grave yard was decimated. Anyone that decided to remain would have had to relocate after subsequent hurricanes.

== Books ==
- The Cheniere Caminada Story: A Commemorative of the Hurricane of 1893, by Robert B. Looper, 1993 ISBN 978-0962172489
- Cheniere Caminada, Or, The Wind Of Death: The Story Of The Storm In Louisiana, ISBN 978-1-331-28396-6
