= Michelle Woodfork =

New Orleans Sheriff

Sheriff of Orleans Parish
- Incumbent
- Assumed office May 4, 2026
- Preceded by: Susan Hutson

Personal details
- Born: c. 1970 New Orleans, Louisiana, U.S.
- Children: 1
- Relatives: Warren Woodfork (uncle); Richard Woodfork (father)
- Education: Southern University at New Orleans (BS, MA)

Michelle M. Woodfork is an American law enforcement official and the Sheriff of Orleans Parish, Louisiana. She was sworn in on May 4, 2026. Woodfork defeated incumbent Susan Hutson in the October 11, 2025 election with 53% of the vote, avoiding a runoff. She is the second Black woman, after Hutson, to be elected sheriff in Louisiana.

Woodfork served as the first woman to lead the New Orleans Police Department when she was appointed interim superintendent in December 2022, making her the first woman of any ethnicity to hold that position. She spent over 33 years with the NOPD before retiring in March 2024.

== Early life and education ==
Woodfork is a lifelong resident of New Orleans East, where she was raised. Her uncle, Warren Woodfork, was the first African American superintendent of the New Orleans Police Department, serving from 1985 to 1991. Her father, Richard Woodfork, also served with the NOPD from 1968 to 1974 before joining the Drug Enforcement Administration.

Woodfork graduated from St. Mary's Academy High School. She earned a Bachelor of Science degree in Criminal Justice with a minor in Political Science and a Master of Arts degree in Criminal Justice with a concentration in Law Enforcement, both from Southern University at New Orleans. She is a member of Alpha Kappa Alpha Sorority, Inc., joining in 1994.

== Law enforcement career ==
=== New Orleans Police Department ===
==== Early career (1991–2016) ====
Woodfork joined the New Orleans Police Department on January 27, 1991. She began her career in the 7th District, which covers New Orleans East, where she served for eight years. During this period, she was honored along with two other officers for helping save the life of a man who was threatening to jump off the Paris Road Bridge.

Woodfork was then assigned to the department's Sex Crimes and Child Abuse Unit, where she worked for 12 years as both a detective and sergeant. In 2012, she was selected by then-Superintendent Ronal Serpas to launch and command the Alternative Police Response Unit, where officers handle low-priority 911 calls.

In 2016, Woodfork was promoted to lieutenant and initially assigned to the 7th District before moving to the 2nd District.

==== 2017 Endymion parade incident ====
On February 25, 2017, while working as a lieutenant on parade duty during the Krewe of Endymion parade, Woodfork was struck by a drunk driver who plowed his vehicle into a crowd at the intersection of North Carrollton Avenue and Orleans Avenue. She was one of approximately 30 people injured in the incident, suffering a broken leg and other injuries. She received the Purple Heart Letter Award in 2017 for her injuries sustained in the line of duty.

After an extended recovery that sidelined her until approximately 2019, Woodfork returned to active duty. She was subsequently assigned to the 1st District before being promoted to captain in November 2021. She then served as Captain of the NOPD Management Services Bureau.

==== Interim Superintendent (2022–2023) ====
On December 20, 2022, New Orleans Mayor LaToya Cantrell appointed Woodfork as interim superintendent of the New Orleans Police Department, succeeding Shaun Ferguson who retired from the position. Woodfork was sworn in on December 22, 2022, becoming the first woman to lead the department.

During her 10-month tenure as interim superintendent, Woodfork oversaw a decline in violent crime in New Orleans. By mid-2023, the city reported a 19% decrease in homicides, and by year's end, homicides had declined by 27%. She also oversaw recruitment efforts that added 104 police recruits and 107 civilian employees to the department.

Woodfork was one of three finalists for the permanent superintendent position and was widely viewed as Mayor Cantrell's preferred candidate. However, in September 2023, Cantrell selected Anne Kirkpatrick as the permanent superintendent after a national search. After Kirkpatrick's appointment, Woodfork served as deputy superintendent from October 2023 until her retirement.

==== Retirement from NOPD ====
On February 29, 2024, Woodfork announced her retirement from the New Orleans Police Department, effective March 1, 2024, ending a 33-year career with the department. At the time of her retirement announcement, she stated her intention to focus on spending time with her teenage son and parents.

=== Orleans Parish District Attorney's Office ===
In April 2024, approximately two months after retiring from the NOPD, Woodfork joined the Orleans Parish District Attorney's Office as Director of Forensics and Intelligence. In this role, she led the Open Source Intelligence Taskforce, a unit established in partnership with Bancroft Global Development, an artificial intelligence firm that helps the district attorney's office use digital data from social media and other sources to build cases. District Attorney Jason Williams stated that Woodfork's role involved working closely with the NOPD's homicide unit and coordinating cases as they move through the court system to strengthen prosecutions of homicides and violent crimes.

== 2025 Orleans Parish Sheriff election ==
=== Campaign ===
On February 14, 2025, Woodfork announced her candidacy for Orleans Parish Sheriff. She was supported by Orleans Parish District Attorney Jason Williams, who endorsed her shortly after the May 16, 2025 escape of 10 inmates from the Orleans Justice Center.

Woodfork's campaign focused on restoring public confidence in the sheriff's office, increasing transparency in jail operations, and implementing a strategic staffing plan to address chronic understaffing at the Orleans Parish Sheriff's Office. She criticized incumbent Sheriff Susan Hutson for lack of transparency in managing the sheriff's finances and for what she termed "poor leadership" and "incompetence" following the jailbreak.

According to campaign finance reports filed in July 2025, Woodfork had raised approximately $128,000, the most of any candidate in the race. By early October, her campaign had raised approximately $367,000.

In a June 2025 poll by the University of New Orleans, Woodfork led the race with 43% support among likely voters. A late September poll showed her maintaining a commanding lead over her opponents.

=== Election results ===
In the October 11, 2025 election, Woodfork defeated five other candidates, including incumbent Sheriff Susan Hutson and 2nd City Court Constable Edwin Shorty. Woodfork received 53% of the vote, avoiding a runoff election. Shorty finished second with 21% of the vote, while Hutson placed third with 17%.

Woodfork was sworn in as Orleans Parish Sheriff on May 4, 2026.

== Electoral History ==
=== Orleans Parish Sheriff, 2025 ===
Nonpartisan primary election, October 11, 2025

Candidate	Affiliation	Support	Outcome
Michelle Woodfork	Democratic	54,019 (52.9%)	Elected
Edwin M. Shorty, Jr.	Democratic	21,199 (20.8%)	Defeated
Susan Hutson (incumbent)	Democratic	17,469 (17.1%)	Defeated
Ernest Lee, Sr.	Republican	4,614 (4.5%)	Defeated
Julian Parker	Democratic	2,431 (2.4%)	Defeated
Bob Murray	Democratic	2,369 (2.3%)	Defeated
