= Orleans Parish Prison =

Prison in New Orleans, Louisiana, United States

New Orleans City Prison
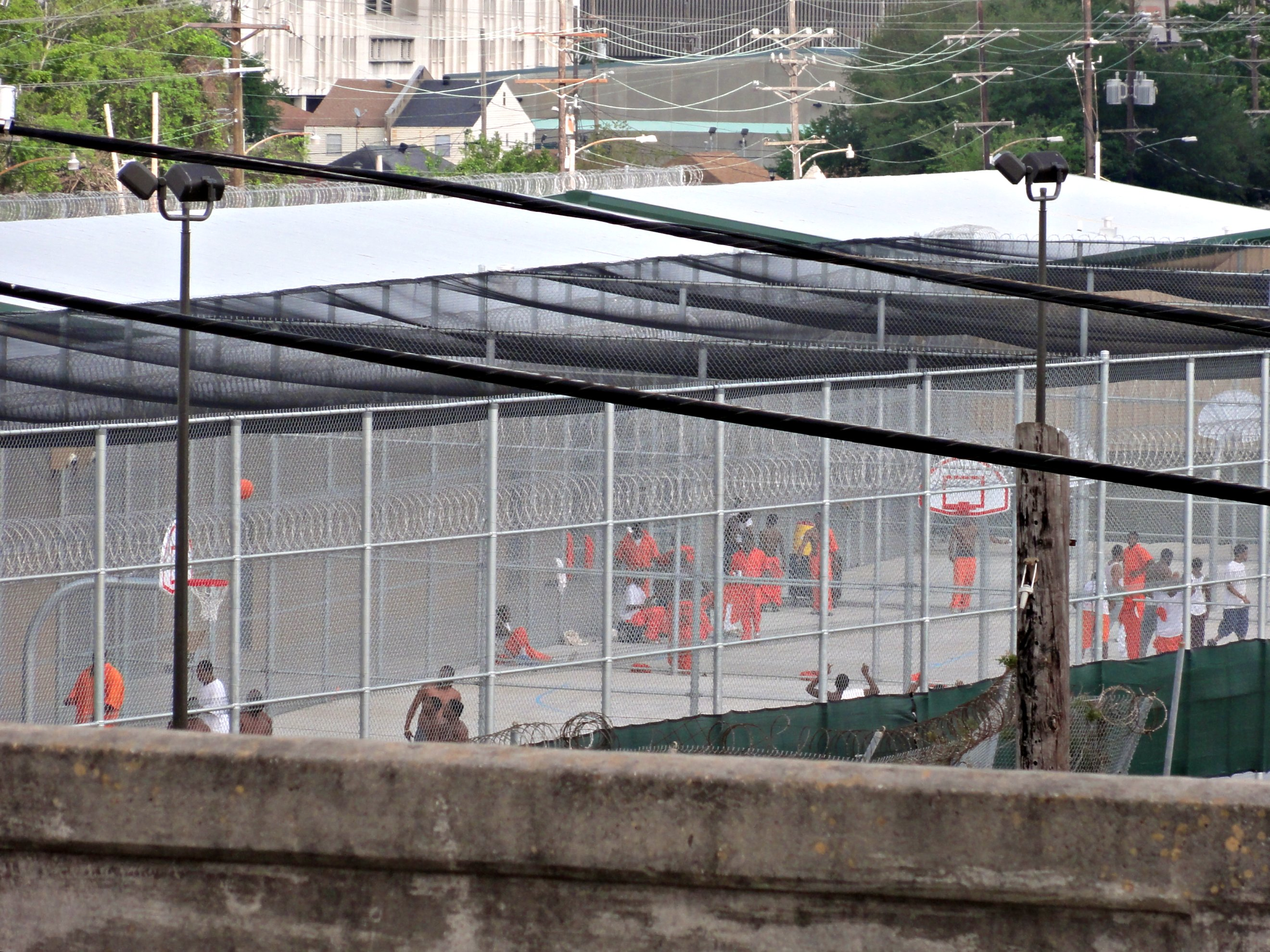
- Inmates in an Orleans Parish Prison yard in 2012
- Interactive map of New Orleans City Prison
- Location: New Orleans, Louisiana; 29.9612046°N 90.0952397°W
- Status: Operational
- Capacity: 1,438
- Population: 1,003 (September 2022)
- Opened: 1837
- Managed by: Orleans Parish Sheriff's Office
- Warden: Captain Chaz Ruiz
- Website: Orleans Parish Sheriff’s Office

Notable prisoners
- Troy E. Brown

Orleans Parish Prison is the city jail for New Orleans, Louisiana. First opened in 1837, it is operated by the Orleans Parish Sheriff's Office. Most of the prisoners—1,300 of the 1,500 or so as of June 2016—are awaiting trial.

In May 2013, Orleans Parish Prison ranked as one of the ten worst prisons in the United States, based on reporting in Mother Jones magazine.

== Early history ==
=== First location ===
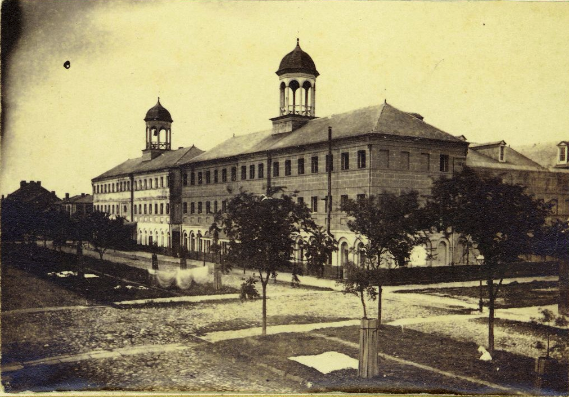
The first Orleans Parish Prison in 1864

The old Parish Prison opened in 1837 on the square bound by Orleans, Tremé, St. Ann, and Marais. Architects Joseph Pilié and A. Voilquin designed it in an austere Franco-Spanish style with two cupolas, and it was built during 1831–1836. It was progressively organized, with sections for different offenders and offenses.

During the day, prisoners were kept outside in the segregated courtyards. At night, most prisoners slept on the floor of crowded cells with only two blankets each.

In 1895, The Times-Picayune described Orleans Parish Prison as:

"the place where refractory slaves were sent to receive a dose of cat o'nine tails, or to be confined in the dungeons in extreme cases the rebellious blacks were kept dark cells on a diet of bread and water. Jailors subjected enslaved people to degrading and torturous prison conditions as a punishment for running away."

In 1891, an angry mob breached the prison and lynched 11 Italian men who had been acquitted of the murder of Police Chief David C. Hennessy, hastening plans to replace the prison. The prison closed in early 1895. The location was later used to construct a building for the Sewerage and Water Board that is today just behind Municipal Auditorium.

=== Second location ===
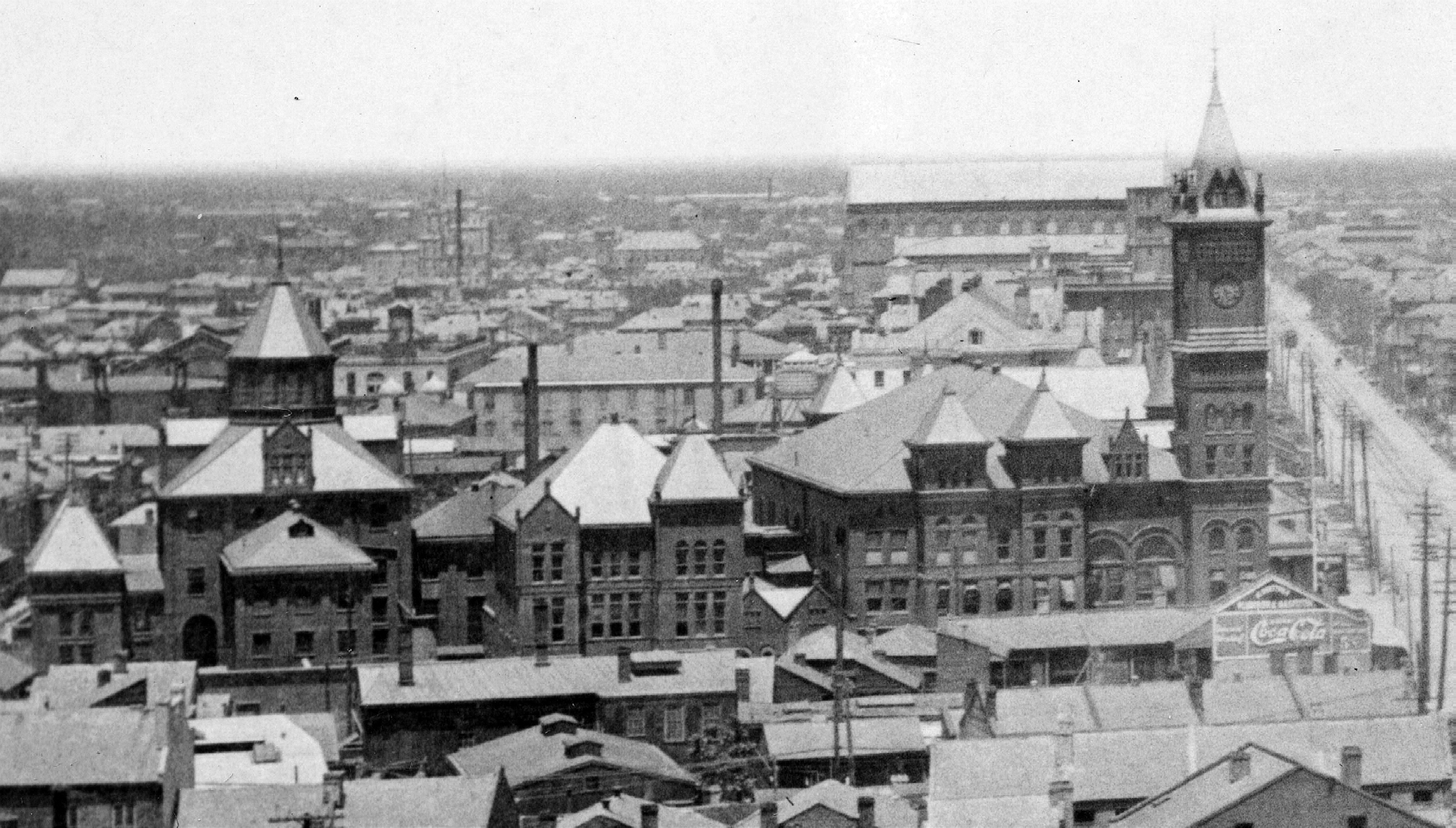
The second Orleans Parish Prison at left, next to the contemporary Criminal Courts Building, around 1900

The new parish prison was behind the Criminal Courts Building at Elks Place on Tulane and Saratoga. It was designed by Max A. Orlopp Jr., who specialized in Richardson Romanesque courthouses in Southern cities. The location was considered at the time to be a tough neighborhood, and the large judicial, police, and prison complex was intended to convey judicial power and order.

=== Third location ===
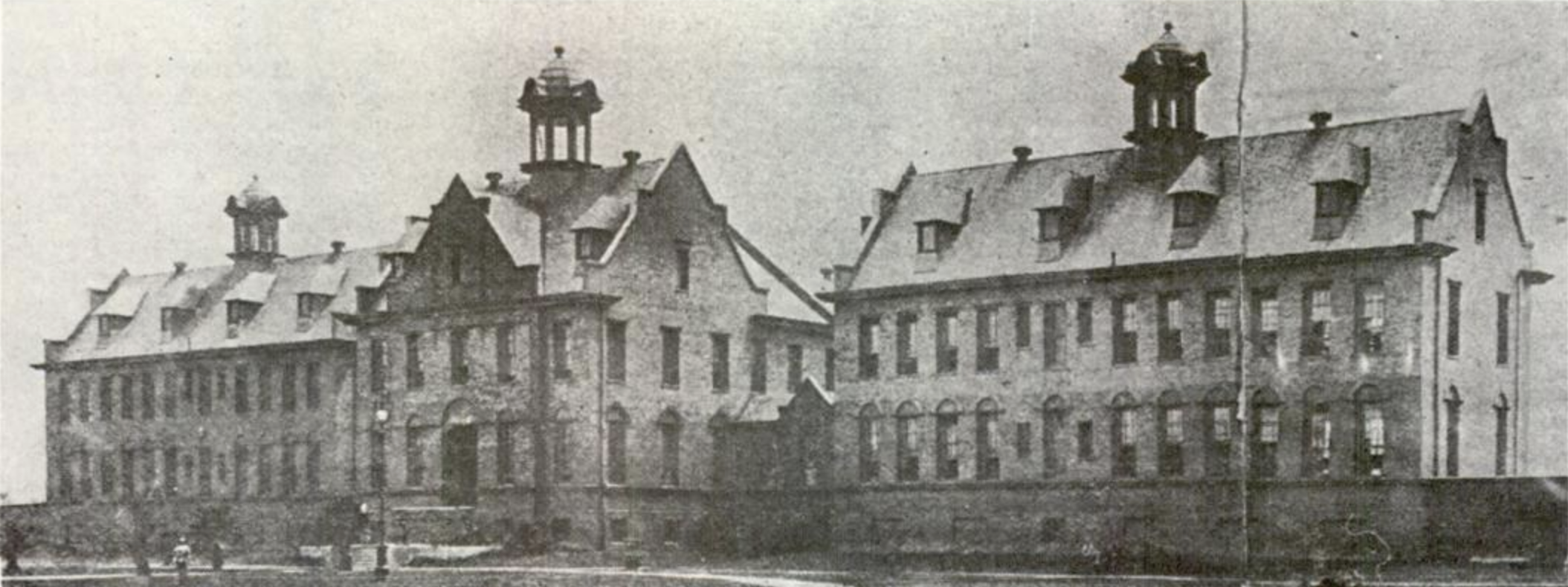
The third Orleans Parish Prison, in operation 1901–1929

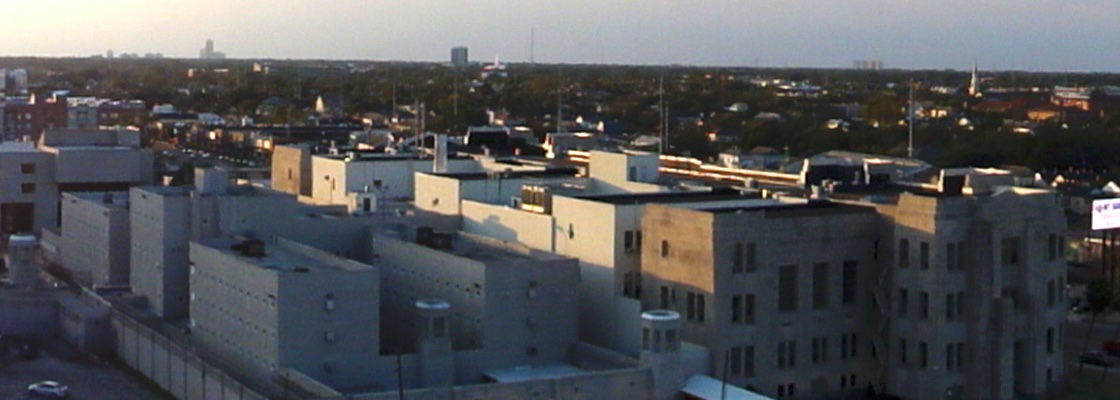
Rear of the current Orleans Parish Criminal Courts Building, showing its original prison facilities in 2012

The House of Detention on Tulane Avenue and Broad Street opened in 1901, which had formerly been the site of the second New Orleans U.S. Marine Hospital. The prison was demolished in 1929 to construct the current Orleans Parish Criminal Courts Building, which had its own prison facilities at its rear. In 1931, prison and court functions were relocated to these new facilities at Tulane and Broad.

== House of Detention and Community Corrections Center ==
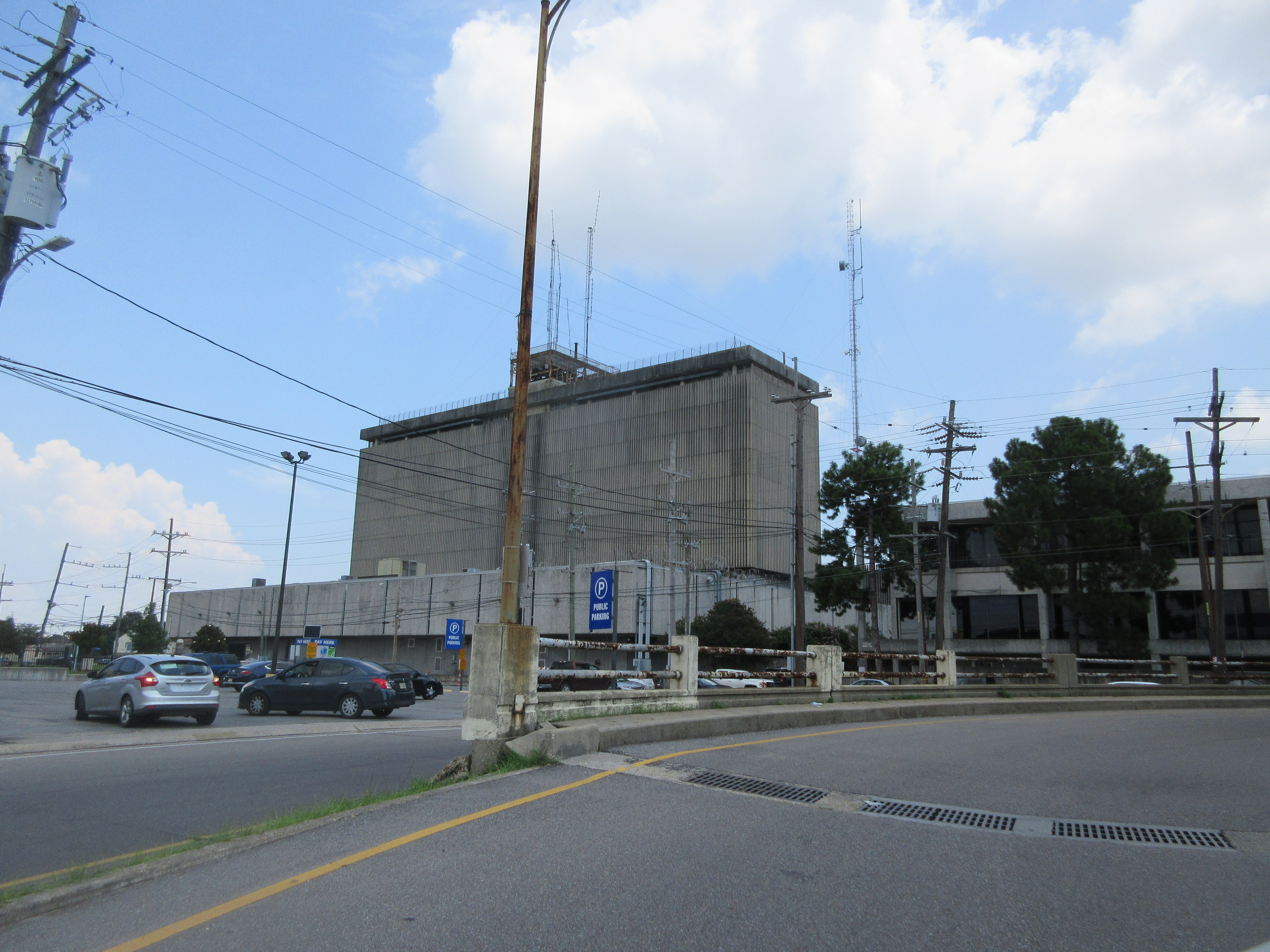
The 1967 House of Detention photographed in 2021 after its closure

In 1967, the House of Detention complex opened at 2735 Perdido St, followed by the Community Corrections Center (CCC) complex across the street in 1976.

The Orleans Parish Prison has had tremendous problems for a long time, mostly caused by lack of monitoring of the inmates by deputies. Several fights, stabbings and deaths have occurred in the prison, mostly in the 13-story high-rise House of Detention which has become infamous. A group of inmates filed a class-action lawsuit against the jail in 1969 but problems still went unaddressed. Statistics researchers considered Orleans Parish Prison to be probably the worst jail in the country. The prison was described as too large, understaffed, and filthy. Prisoners lived in fear of being beaten or raped. In 2012 there were 600 ambulance runs to the emergency room, with more than half of them related to violence. Guards rarely patrolled the House of Detention, one of several buildings comprising the Orleans Parish Prison complex. Prisoners had access to drugs and weapons such as kitchen knives and handguns by way of guards.

=== Abandonment during Hurricane Katrina ===
On August 29, 2005, when Hurricane Katrina–an extremely destructive and deadly category 5 hurricane–struck the Gulf Coast, the staff of Orleans Parish Sheriff's Office abandoned the jail, leaving roughly 650 prisoners in their cells with no access to food, water, or ventilation for days. Deputies returned to the Orleans Parish Prison days later and began evacuating inmates to surrounding areas which included the Elayn Hunt Correctional Center, the I-10 overpass, and the Broad Avenue overpass.

In over 400 testimonials conducted by the American Civil Liberties Union, prisoners described their experiences during the abandonment which included exposure to floodwater and other elements, hunger, beatings by jail staff and other inmates, and other racially-charged abuse by jail staff. While there is no official death count for prisoners that were left behind, 517 prisoners were later registered as "unaccounted for" by Humans Rights Watch.

CCC has since been abandoned since 2005, and HOD closed in 2012.

Between April 2006 and April 2014, The Times-Picayune reports 44 inmate deaths, including seven "uncounted" deaths, referring to inmates released shortly before their deaths. Since the report, there have been five additional fatalities, bringing the total to 49 since April 2006.

== Current facility ==
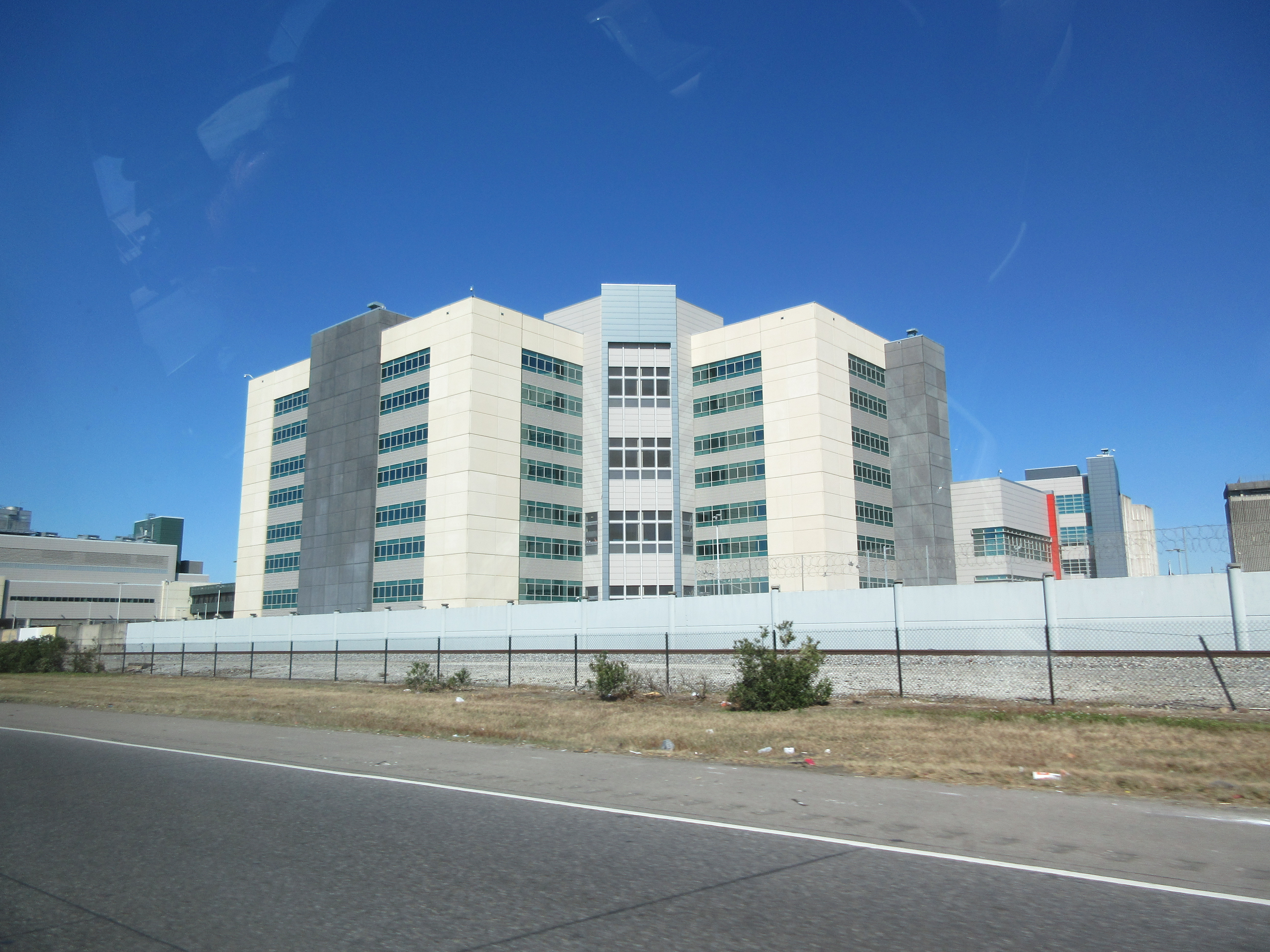
The current prison facility in 2019

The Federal Emergency Management Agency dedicated $223 million to the Orleans Parish Sheriff's Office for restoration of its facilities following Hurricane Katrina in 2005. The Sheriff's Office has outlined three phases of construction that would utilize these funds.

The Phase I facility is a three-story, 163,885 square foot (15,225.4 m^{2}) building consisting of a kitchen and warehouse. Opened in 2015, Phase II contains 1,438 beds and cost $146 million to construct.

The Sheriff’s Office plans to build an additional 750-bed facility as Phase III. The Orleans Parish Prison Reform Coalition opposes the plan, calling on former Democratic Mayor Mitch Landrieu's office to "oppose any options involving the expansion of the jail," and instead support "retrofitting of the current jail to better care for incarcerated special populations." In 2021, Susan Hutson defeated longtime incumbent Marlin N. Gusman to become the city's next sheriff. Her campaign was centered on opposition to the Phase III planned jail expansion. Nonetheless, it was ultimately unsuccessful; in 2023, a federal judge ordered the city to begin construction.

Just after midnight on May 16, 2025, ten inmates (including six charged with murder or attempted murder) escaped from Orleans Parish Prison through a hole behind a toilet; eight of the ten would be recaptured by May 26. One of the two final inmates at large, Antoine Massey, would be recaptured on June 27, 2025. The final escapee, Derrick Groves, was recaptured on October 8, 2025, nearly five months after the jailbreak.

== Notable inmates ==
The 10 to 12 adult women onboard the Golden Venture vessel from China that washed ashore in the Rockaways in New York City in June 1993 were kept at Orleans Parish Prison for a few years.

On November 29, 2015, state Senator Troy E. Brown of Ascension Parish was booked in the Orleans Parish Prison for domestic abuse battery, a misdemeanor stemming from an incident with his alleged long-term paramour, a woman from Labadieville, at the Hyatt Regency Hotel near the Superdome in New Orleans.
