= Orleans Parish, Louisiana =

Orleans Parish
- Parish
- Parish of Orleans; Paroisse d'Orléans (French); Parroquia de Orleans (Spanish)
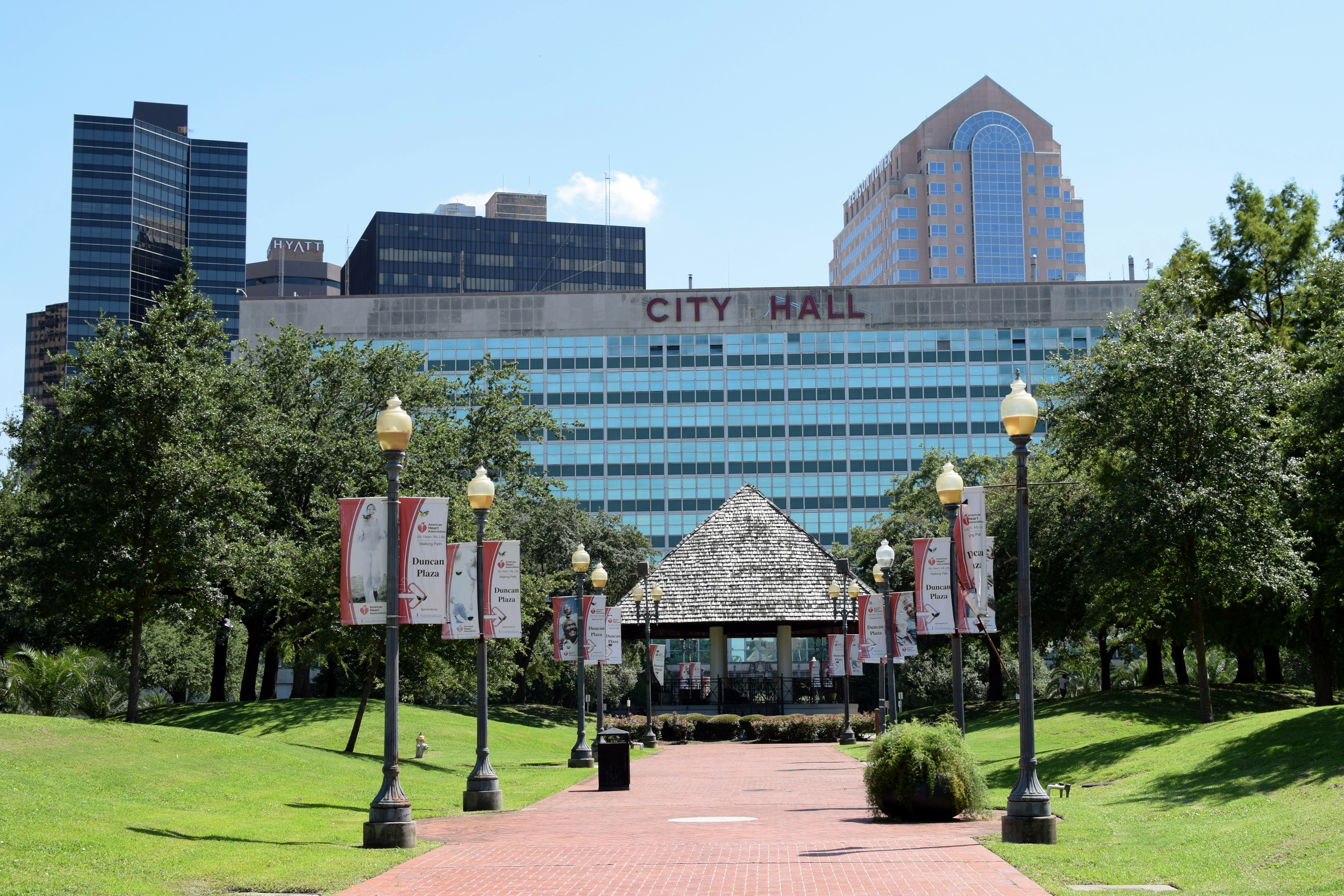
- Duncan Plaza and City Hall, New Orleans (2014); The city of New Orleans and the parish of Orleans are largely governed as a single consolidated city.

- Location within the U.S. state of Louisiana
- Coordinates: 29°58′N 90°03′W
- Country: United States
- State: Louisiana
- Founded: April 14, 1807
- Named for: Philippe II, Duke of Orléans (1674–1723)
- Seat: New Orleans
- Largest city: New Orleans

Area
  - Total: 349.85 sq mi (906.1 km^{2})
  - Land: 169.42 sq mi (438.8 km^{2})
  - Water: 180.43 sq mi (467.3 km^{2})

Population (2020)
  - Total: 383,997
  - Estimate (2025): 362,184 ▼
  - Density: 2,266.5/sq mi (875.12/km^{2})
- Time zone: UTC−6 (Central)
  - Summer (DST): UTC−5 (CDT)
- Congressional districts: 1st, 2nd

Orleans Parish (French: Paroisse d'Orléans; Spanish: Parroquia de Orleans) is a parish of the U.S. state of Louisiana. Since 1870, the parish has been coterminous with the city of New Orleans, and the parish and city are largely governed as a single consolidated city.

== History ==
On April 10, 1805, the Territory of Orleans was divided into 12 counties, including Orleans County. On April 14, 1807, the territory was also divided into 19 civil parishes while keeping the previous system of counties intact. Based on the boundaries and names of earlier ecclesiastical parishes, Orleans County was divided into Orleans, St. Bernard, and Plaquemines parishes, with New Orleans inside the Orleans Parish limits. The county remained responsible for elections and taxation, while the parishes took over responsibility for civil, criminal, probate, and other judicial matters. The system of counties was never explicitly abolished, but the Louisiana Constitution of 1845 dropped any reference to counties and gave their powers to the parishes.

At its establishment, the Orleans Parish government was led by a police jury, which had only limited authority within the city of New Orleans. In 1822, when the police jury began to be elected popularly, the New Orleans City Council was granted a veto over fiscal matters. In 1840, the parish was divided in two along the Mississippi River. A second police jury was established and given authority over Algiers. It was formally named the Police Jury of the Parish of Orleans on the right bank of the River Mississippi. By 1846, the original police jury had become inactive and was abolished, resulting in the consolidation of the left bank with New Orleans. In 1870, the remainder of Orleans Parish was consolidated when the city became coextensive with the parish.

The completion of Chef Menteur Highway in the 1850s connected far-flung communities such as Irish Bayou.

== Geography ==
Orleans Parish is coextensive with New Orleans. Both are bounded by St. Tammany Parish and Lake Pontchartrain to the north, St. Bernard Parish and Lake Borgne to the east, Plaquemines Parish to the south, and Jefferson Parish to the south and west. The parish is part of the New Orleans–Metairie metropolitan statistical area.

Orleans Parish originally extended as far west as present-day Kenner and as far south as Grand Isle. In 1824, uncertainty over the relative locations of Grand Isle and Cheniere Caminada resulted in a territorial dispute between Orleans Parish and Lafourche Interior Parish (now Lafourche). The dispute was resolved in 1825 with the creation of Jefferson Parish, which included these areas.

In 1852, New Orleans annexed the city of LaFayette (now Faubourg Lafayette) while keeping the parish boundaries unchanged, causing the city to extend into Jefferson Parish. However, subsequent annexations of Jefferson in 1870 and Carrollton in 1874 included the redrawing of both city and parish boundaries. Since 1870, Orleans Parish has been coextensive with New Orleans. In 1979, parish boundaries through Lake Pontchartrain were defined, resulting in a gain of territory for the parish.

== Demographics ==
Historical population
Year	Pop.	±%
1810	24,552	—
1820	41,351	+68.4%
1830	49,826	+20.5%
1840	102,193	+105.1%
1850	119,460	+16.9%
1860	174,491	+46.1%
1870	191,418	+9.7%
Population given for Orleans Parish, including the city of New Orleans, before New Orleans absorbed suburbs and rural areas of Orleans Parish in 1874, since which time the city and parish have been coextensive. For more recent population figures, see New Orleans § Demographics. Source: U.S. Decennial Census

=== 2020 census ===
As of the 2020 census, the parish had a population of 383,997, a median age of 36.2 years, 20.3% of residents under the age of 18, and 14.7% of residents 65 years of age or older; for every 100 females there were 89.3 males, and for every 100 females age 18 and over there were 86.2 males age 18 and over.

The racial makeup of the parish was 32.9% White, 54.2% Black or African American, 0.3% American Indian and Alaska Native, 2.8% Asian, <0.1% Native Hawaiian and Pacific Islander, 3.2% from some other race, and 6.4% from two or more races; Hispanic or Latino residents of any race comprised 8.1% of the population.

99.6% of residents lived in urban areas, while 0.4% lived in rural areas.

There were 165,125 households in the parish, of which 25.5% had children under the age of 18 living in them. Of all households, 26.4% were married-couple households, 24.9% were households with a male householder and no spouse or partner present, and 40.7% were households with a female householder and no spouse or partner present. About 38.3% of all households were made up of individuals and 11.5% had someone living alone who was 65 years of age or older.

There were 193,840 housing units, of which 14.8% were vacant. Among occupied housing units, 45.5% were owner-occupied and 54.5% were renter-occupied. The homeowner vacancy rate was 2.4% and the rental vacancy rate was 9.5%.

=== Racial and ethnic composition ===
Orleans Parish, Louisiana – Racial and ethnic composition Note: the US Census treats Hispanic/Latino as an ethnic category. This table excludes Latinos from the racial categories and assigns them to a separate category. Hispanics/Latinos may be of any race.
Race / Ethnicity (NH = Non-Hispanic)	Pop 1980	Pop 1990	Pop 2000	Pop 2010	Pop 2020	% 1980	% 1990	% 2000	% 2010	% 2020
White alone (NH)	224,694	164,526	128,871	104,770	121,385	40.30%	33.11%	26.59%	30.47%	31.61%
Black or African American alone (NH)	304,673	305,047	323,392	204,866	205,876	54.65%	61.39%	66.72%	59.58%	53.61%
Native American or Alaska Native alone (NH)	524	660	852	827	761	0.09%	0.13%	0.18%	0.24%	0.20%
Asian alone (NH)	7,332	8,955	10,919	9,883	10,573	1.32%	1.80%	2.25%	2.87%	2.75%
Native Hawaiian or Pacific Islander alone (NH)	x	x	88	105	125	x	x	0.02%	0.03%	0.03%
Other race alone (NH)	1,066	512	961	967	2,075	0.19%	0.10%	0.20%	0.28%	0.54%
Mixed race or Multiracial (NH)	x	x	4,765	4,360	12,185	x	x	0.98%	1.27%	3.17%
Hispanic or Latino (any race)	19,226	17,238	14,826	18,051	31,017	3.45%	3.47%	3.06%	5.25%	8.08%
Total	557,515	496,938	484,674	343,829	383,997	100.00%	100.00%	100.00%	100.00%	100.00%

=== Population estimates ===
As of 2017, Orleans Parish is the third most populous parish in Louisiana, behind East Baton Rouge Parish and neighboring Jefferson Parish.

== Government ==
Since consolidation, Orleans Parish has retained a nominal, sui generis status under Louisiana state law that guarantees the city's home rule. It has been effectively abolished as a distinct governmental unit, and the United States Census Bureau considers New Orleans and Orleans Parish to be a single consolidated city. However, various parish offices remain with a degree of independence from the city government, while in other matters, the city represents the parish. Examples of parish entities include the Orleans Parish School Board, the Orleans Parish Sheriff's Office, and formerly the Orleans Levee Board.

United States presidential election results for Orleans Parish, Louisiana
Year	Republican		Democratic		Third party(ies)	
Year	No.	%	No.	%	No.	%
1912	904	2.74%	26,433	80.03%	5,692	17.23%
1916	2,531	7.45%	30,936	91.03%	516	1.52%
1920	17,819	35.26%	32,724	64.74%	0	0.00%
1924	7,865	16.46%	37,785	79.06%	2,141	4.48%
1928	14,424	20.51%	55,919	79.49%	0	0.00%
1932	5,407	5.95%	85,288	93.87%	165	0.18%
1936	10,254	8.67%	108,012	91.32%	16	0.01%
1940	16,406	14.35%	97,930	85.63%	28	0.02%
1944	20,190	18.25%	90,411	81.74%	7	0.01%
1948	29,442	23.78%	41,900	33.85%	52,443	42.37%
1952	85,572	48.74%	89,999	51.26%	0	0.00%
1956	93,082	56.54%	64,958	39.46%	6,594	4.01%
1960	47,111	26.80%	87,242	49.64%	41,414	23.56%
1964	81,049	49.69%	82,045	50.31%	0	0.00%
1968	47,728	26.71%	72,451	40.55%	58,489	32.74%
1972	88,075	54.55%	60,790	37.65%	12,581	7.79%
1976	70,925	42.14%	93,130	55.33%	4,249	2.52%
1980	74,302	39.54%	106,858	56.87%	6,744	3.59%
1984	86,316	41.71%	119,478	57.73%	1,162	0.56%
1988	64,763	35.24%	116,851	63.58%	2,186	1.19%
1992	52,019	26.36%	133,261	67.53%	12,069	6.12%
1996	39,576	20.84%	144,720	76.20%	5,615	2.96%
2000	39,404	21.74%	137,630	75.95%	4,187	2.31%
2004	42,847	21.74%	152,610	77.43%	1,646	0.84%
2008	28,130	19.08%	117,102	79.42%	2,207	1.50%
2012	28,003	17.74%	126,722	80.30%	3,088	1.96%
2016	24,292	14.65%	133,996	80.81%	7,524	4.54%
2020	26,664	15.00%	147,854	83.15%	3,301	1.86%
2024	24,119	15.16%	130,749	82.16%	4,262	2.68%

Orleans Parish and the city of New Orleans operate as a merged city-parish government. The original city was composed of what are now the 1st to 9th wards. In 1852, the city of Lafayette, including the Garden District, was added as the 10th and 11th wards. In 1870, Jefferson City, including Faubourg Bouligny and much of the Audubon and University areas, was annexed as the 12th, 13th, and 14th wards. Algiers, on the west bank of the Mississippi, was also annexed in 1870, becoming the 15th ward.

The Orleans Parish Civil Sheriff's Office serves papers involving lawsuits, provides court security, and operates the city's correctional facilities, including Orleans Parish Prison. The sheriff's office shares legal jurisdiction with the New Orleans Police Department and provides it with backup on an as-needed basis. Before 2010, New Orleans (and all other parishes in Louisiana) had separate criminal and civil sheriff's offices, corresponding to the separate criminal and civil courts: these were merged in 2010. As of 2024 the sheriff is Susan Hutson, who defeated 17-year incumbent Marlin Gusman in the 2021 New Orleans City Election.

== Transportation ==
=== Major highways ===
- I-10
  - I-510
  - I-610
- US 11
- US 61
- US 90
  - US 90 Bus.
    - I-49 (future) / I-910 (unsigned)
- LA 39
- LA 46
- LA 47
- LA 406
- LA 407
- LA 428
- LA 611-9
- LA 1253
- LA 1264
- LA 3019
- LA 3021
- LA 3139

=== Public transit ===
- The New Orleans Regional Transit Authority (RTA) serves the entire parish providing bus lines, ferry and streetcar lines.
- Jefferson Parish Transit provides some express service between downtown New Orleans and nearby Jefferson Parish, including service to Louis Armstrong New Orleans International Airport in Kenner.

=== Rail ===
Amtrak serves New Orleans at the New Orleans Union Passenger Terminal. Four Amtrak lines connect here: City of New Orleans, Crescent, Mardi Gras Service and Sunset Limited. The UPT also serves the RTA's Rampart–Loyola Streetcar Line and Greyhound Lines.

== Communities ==
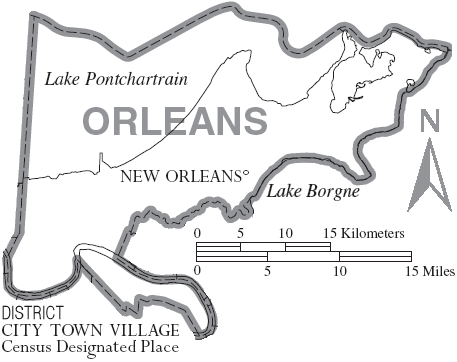
Map of Orleans Parish, with municipal labels

Prior to the consolidation of Orleans Parish and New Orleans, the parish had several distinct communities and municipalities, including:

- Algiers
- Carrollton
- Irish Bayou
- McDonoghville
- Michoud
- New Orleans

Some additional communities were at one point part of Orleans Parish but were later included in other parishes, such as:

- Grand Isle (to Lafourche Interior Parish in 1824, but disputed; to Jefferson Parish in 1825)
- Cheniere Caminada (to Lafourche Interior Parish in 1824, but disputed; to Jefferson Parish in 1825)

== Sources ==
- Richardson, Richard J. (1961). Orleans Parish Offices: Notes on a City-Parish Consolidation. Edgar B. Stern Memorial Honors Fellowship Series. Vol. 1. New Orleans: Bureau of Governmental Research – via HathiTrust.
