= Susan Hutson =

New Orleans Sheriff

Sheriff of Orleans Parish
- In office May 2, 2022 – May 4, 2026
- Preceded by: Marlin Gusman
- Succeeded by: Michelle Woodfork

Personal details
- Born: January 19, 1967 (age 59)
- Party: Democratic
- Education: University of Pennsylvania, Tulane Law School
- Website: Official website

Susan Amele Hutson (born January 19, 1967) is an American lawyer who was the sheriff of Orleans Parish, Louisiana, from May 2, 2022 to May 4, 2026. A member of the Democratic party, Hutson was the first woman to hold the office. Before becoming sheriff, she worked in criminal justice reform and police oversight.

Hutson was elected sheriff of Orleans Parish in 2021 and defeated the four-term incumbent, Marlin Gusman. She lost reelection in 2025 to former interim police chief Michelle Woodfork and received the third most votes in the election after a troubled tenure.

In April 2026, Hutson was indicted by a special grand jury on 30 felony counts, including malfeasance, obstruction of justice and fraud-related charges.

== Early life and education ==
Hutson was born in Philadelphia, Pennsylvania, and raised in Houston, Texas. She graduated from the University of Pennsylvania in 1989 and Tulane Law School in 1992.

== Career ==
=== Police oversight ===
For much of her career, Hutson worked in police oversight in Los Angeles, California, and Austin, Texas. This culminated in her becoming the assistant inspector general for the Los Angeles Police Department from 2007 to 2010. In 2010, she became the independent police monitor for the New Orleans Police Department, a position established after a successful referendum in 2008. She resigned from that position in 2021 after announcing her run for sheriff.

Hutson was also the president of the National Association for Civilian Oversight of Law Enforcement, a citizen police oversight organization created in 2016. She also resigned from this position after announcing her run for sheriff.

=== 2021 election ===
In April 2021, Hutson announced she would run for sheriff of Orleans Parish against the longtime incumbent sheriff Marlin Gusman, who had held the position since 2004, in the elections to be held that November. Her campaign was focused on criminal justice reform and advocated against plans to expand Orleans Parish Prison. She was endorsed by New Orleans District Attorney Jason Williams. Hutson also received a donation of $200,000 from Meta CEO Mark Zuckerberg, which was more than all of her other donations combined.

On November 13, 2021, Hutson placed second in the nonpartisan primary election, 13 points behind Gusman. Because Gusman failed to earn 50% of the vote, he and Hutson advanced to the general election. On December 11, 2021, Hutson won with 53% of the vote.

=== Tenure ===
Hutson was sworn in on May 2, 2022, becoming the first female sheriff of New Orleans and the first Black female sheriff in Louisiana.

In August 2022, inmates at the Orleans Parish jail barricaded themselves inside a pod and demanded better conditions, including better food and medicine, more adequate entertainment, and a washer and dryer. After multiple days, a sprinkler system was activated inside the pod, and Hutson instructed personnel to break in, ending the standoff. None of the prisoners’ demands was considered.

In April 2023, Hutson proposed a ballot measure that would have generated $11.7 million a year for the sheriff’s office by increasing property taxes. The measure failed with 91% of voters rejecting it.

In July 2023, federal jail monitors found that jail conditions, which started falling in 2020 under Gusman, had continued to decline under Hutson. The report stated that despite cooperation from Hutson, conditions did not improve, with drug smuggling and frequent violence among inmates. It attributed this decline to a lack of resources and staff.

Hutson's opposition to the expansion of the Orleans Parish Prison, on which she centered her campaign, was ultimately unsuccessful after U.S. district judge Lance Africk denied Hutson’s motion in 2023 and ordered the city to begin construction. Hutson denounced the decision but nonetheless vowed to follow it.

=== 2025 election ===
Hutson ran for reelection as sheriff of Orleans Parish in 2025 and received the third most votes in the election held on October 11, 2025, won by Michelle Woodfork.

=== Controversies ===
In March 2023, Hutson fired four high-ranking officials from the sheriff's office, saying the office was going through "organizational restructuring". One of the officials, CFO David Trautenberg, claimed in a lawsuit that he was fired for opening an internal financial investigation into alleged "misuse of public funds". It was reported that the funds Trautenberg referred to, nearly $20,000 of taxpayer money, were spent for senior staff to stay in high-end hotel rooms during Mardi Gras season, most of which reportedly remained unoccupied. Hutson said there was nothing irregular about the expenditure, saying it was "money well spent".

After the 2023 Mardi Gras season, it was reported that Hutson overpaid deputies who took on additional duties during the celebrations. According to the inspector general of New Orleans, the payments violated state and federal law.

On May 16, 2025, ten inmates with violent charges, including homicide, escaped overnight by moving a toilet fixture and went unnoticed and unreported to partner agencies for over ten hours. Shortly thereafter, Hutson suspended her campaign. At the time of qualifying for re-election on July 9, 2025, one inmate remained at large. In April 2026, Hutson was indicted by a grand jury on 30 felony counts, including malfeasance, obstruction of justice and fraud-related charges.

== Electoral history ==
=== Orleans Parish Sheriff, 2021 ===
Nonpartisan primary election, November 13, 2021

| Candidate | Affiliation | Support | Outcome |
|---|---|---|---|
| Marlin Gusman (incumbent) | Democratic | 35,903 (47.7%) | Runoff |
| Susan Hutson | Democratic | 26,666 (35.4%) | Runoff |
| Christopher Williams | Democratic | 6,651 (8.8%) | Defeated |
| Janet Hayes | No party | 3,230 (4.3%) | Defeated |
| Quentin Brown | Independent | 2,791 (3.7%) | Defeated |

General election, December 11, 2021

| Candidate | Affiliation | Support | Outcome |
|---|---|---|---|
| Susan Hutson | Democratic | 31,975 (53.3%) | Elected |
| Marlin Gusman (incumbent) | Democratic | 27,987 (46.7%) | Defeated |

=== Orleans Parish Sheriff, 2025 ===
Nonpartisan primary election, October 11, 2025

| Candidate | Affiliation | Support | Outcome |
|---|---|---|---|
| Michelle Woodfork | Democratic | 54,019 (52.9%) | Elected |
| Edwin M. Shorty Jr. | Democratic | 21,199 (20.8%) | Defeated |
| Susan Hutson (incumbent) | Democratic | 17,469 (17.1%) | Defeated |
| Ernest Lee | Republican | 4,614 (4.5%) | Defeated |
| Julian Parker | Democratic | 2,431 (2.4%) | Defeated |
| Bob Murray | Democratic | 2,369 (2.3%) | Defeated |
