= Calvin Duncan (legal advocate) =

American prisoner rights activist

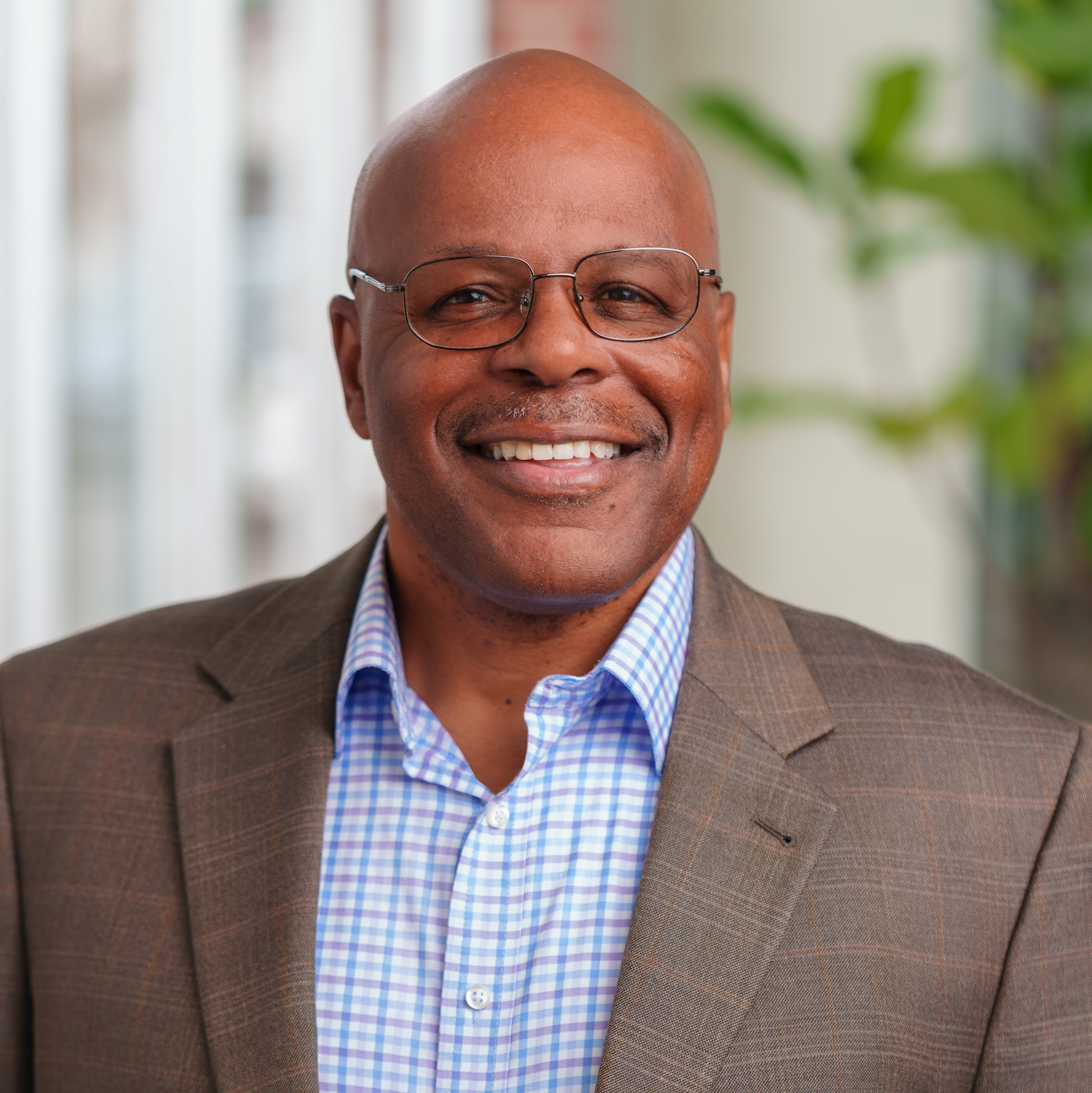
- Duncan in 2025
- Born: 1962 or 1963 (age 62–63); New Orleans, Louisiana, US
- Education: Tulane University (AA, BA); Lewis & Clark Law School (JD)
- Occupations: Activist, law instructor, court clerk
- Known for: Jailhouse lawyer, prisoner rights activist, legal advocate, memoirist, political candidate
- Notable work: The Jailhouse Lawyer
- Office: Clerk of Criminal Court for Orleans Parish, Louisiana
- Term: May 2026
- Predecessor: Darren Lombard
- Political party: Democratic
- Criminal charges: Murder, attempted armed robbery
- Criminal penalty: Life without parole
- Criminal status: Vacated
- Awards: Soros Justice Fellowship, Echoing Green Fellowship
- Website: calvinduncan.com

Calvin F. Duncan (born 1962 or 1963) is an American legal advocate and prisoner rights activist. As a teenager, in 1982, he was arrested for murder, then convicted and imprisoned at Louisiana State Penitentiary for most of 28 and a half years. While imprisoned, and with only a ninth-grade education, Duncan taught himself criminal law, and served as a jailhouse lawyer, helping other convicts get their release.

Following his release after a plea bargain, Duncan founded and co-founded multiple foundations to protect prisoners' legal rights, was instrumental in successfully bringing a case to the United States Supreme Court, was exonerated of the murder, earned a Juris Doctor degree from Lewis & Clark Law School at the age of 60, and co-wrote his memoir, The Jailhouse Lawyer, which became a best-seller.

In 2025, he was elected clerk of the same criminal court that had earlier convicted him for murder. In a move condemned as racist, the state legislature passed a bill that abolished the clerk position before he could take office.

== Early life ==
Calvin F. Duncan was born in New Orleans, in 1962 or 1963 (age 62–63), and grew up in the area around the Desire Projects, known as the poorest and most dangerous neighborhood in New Orleans. After their mother died, he and his younger sister lived with a series of different relatives and transferred between different schools. At the age of 14, Duncan was arrested for shoplifting clothes to wear to school. Duncan left school after ninth grade, and joined the Job Corps to get out of New Orleans.

== Murder arrest and trial ==
On the night of August 7, 1981, in New Orleans Tremé neighborhood, 23-year-old David Yeager was fatally shot in a robbery. His 15-year-old girlfriend said the killers were two young black men, and the shooter was light skinned, heavy-set, 5 feet 10 inches (1.78 m) tall, and wearing a sun visor. A week later she said the shooter was 5 feet 8 inches (1.73 m) tall, wearing a knit cap. In February 1982, a man called in to the Crime Stoppers program in response to a $1000 reward, and accused a black man named Calvin Duncan. (Note: New Orleans police had earlier interviewed a man named Henry Duncan.) Yeager's girlfriend was shown a photo array, and picked out Duncan's mugshot from age 14, but said she was not sure. Later she said she was sure. (Note: In grand jury testimony she said it could have been a week or so after.) The police issued an arrest warrant for Duncan, and named him in a television broadcast. In July, another tip to Crime Stoppers said Duncan was working in Clackamas County, Oregon.

On August 6, 1982, at age 19, while working on a Job Corps project in Mount Hood National Forest, Oregon, Duncan was arrested and charged with Yeager's murder. Oregon arresting officers wrote that in questioning, Duncan said that the eyewitness was white, which only an involved person would have known; Duncan said she must have been white or they would not have tried so hard.

When Duncan's attorney filed a request with the Orleans Parish District Attorney's office for any exculpatory evidence, he was told there was none. In 1983, the lead Oregon arresting officer pled guilty to illegally wiretapping a county official. In 1984, a New Orleans assistant prosecutor wrote a memo pointing out the problems with the case against Duncan – the tentativeness of the identification, the felony conviction of the lead questioning officer – and recommending a plea bargain. There was no plea bargain and these issues were not shared with the defense.

Without other resources, and with only a ninth-grade education, Duncan tried to prepare his own defense. He wrote a 1984 motion titled "Motion for a Law Book" and sent it to the Louisiana Supreme Court, which redirected it to the New Orleans Fourth Circuit, which in turn redirected it to the trial court, which gave him a Louisiana Code of Criminal Procedure. His girlfriend would copy case law from the Louisiana Supreme Court Law Library for him. Unexpectedly, Duncan says, while working on his own case, he "fell in love with the law". One of his first legal victories was filing an emergency lawsuit in Orleans Parish Prison under the cruel and unusual punishment clause of the Eighth Amendment to the United States Constitution on behalf of older prisoners without teeth to chew the tough meat they were given; the sheriff agreed to give the men dentures. He was called the Snickers lawyer, for the candy fee prisoners gave him for his help.

Duncan's wait for a trial lasted three years; the trial, in Orleans Parish Criminal District Court, took one day. Duncan was neither light-skinned nor heavyset as the eyewitness had described, and had prominent gold teeth that she had not noticed; in her testimony she said he appeared to have lost a lot of weight. The prosecution's arguments stressed how he had revealed facts about the murder that only someone involved could have known, and that the eyewitness was always certain in her identification. On January 29, 1985, Duncan was convicted of first-degree murder and sentenced to life without parole.

== Imprisonment in Angola ==
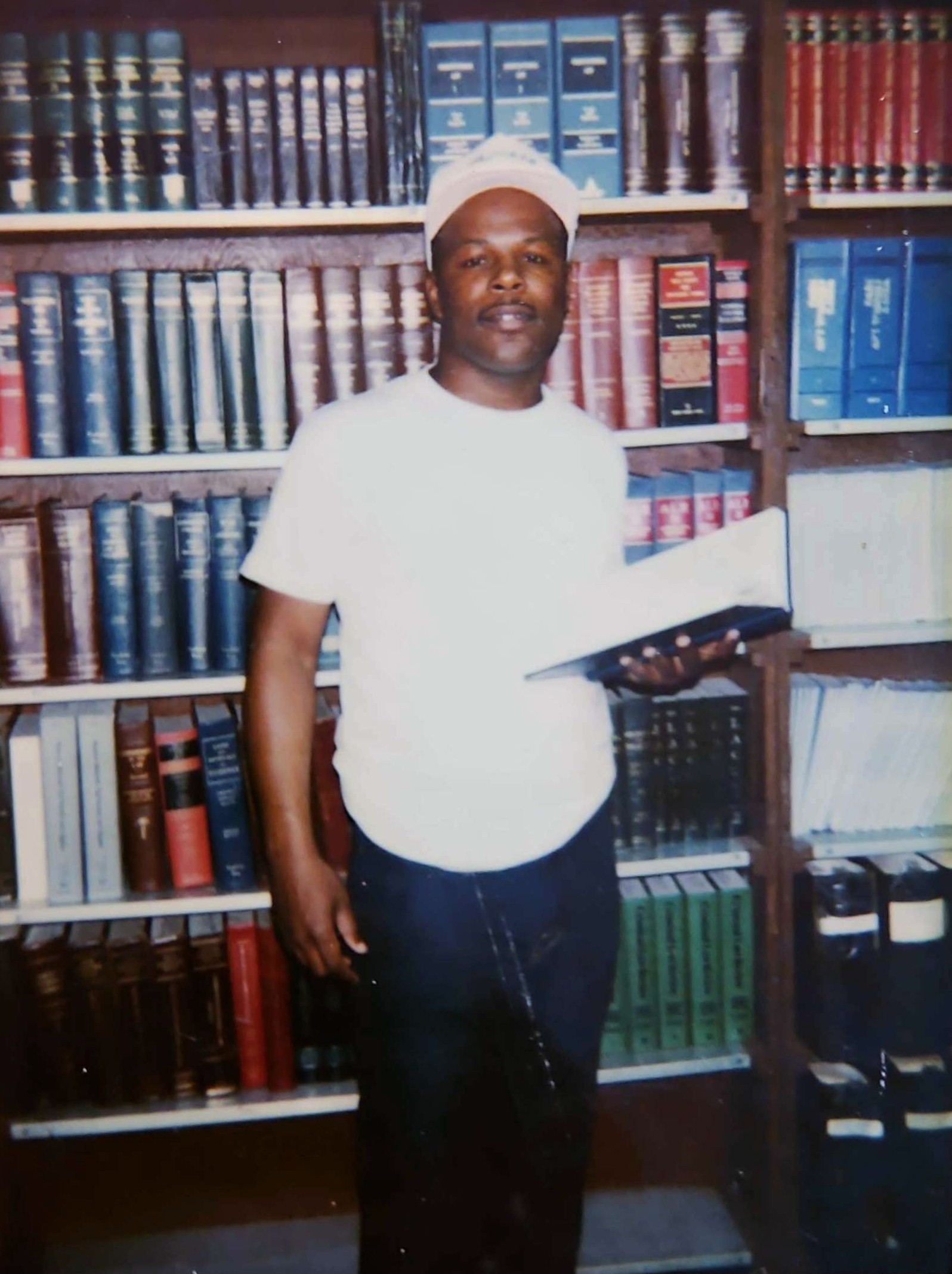
Duncan at the Angola Louisiana State Penitentiary Law Library, circa 1986

In 1986, after spending four years in Orleans Parish Prison, Duncan was sent to Louisiana State Penitentiary, known as "Angola" for the slave plantation that used to be the site of its land. The first task Duncan was given on arriving at Angola was clearing the cotton stalks left after the harvest, much like at the plantation 120 years before: prisoners, mostly black men, working the land, while white men with guns looked on. Duncan said going to Angola was "like going from hell to paradise" for him, because there he was able to study what he loved. He continued studying the law, after one year earned his GED, and became an "inmate counsel substitute" or jailhouse lawyer, a prisoner who gave legal assistance to other prisoners. He helped several of them challenge their convictions, including author and journalist Wilbert Rideau, who was freed in 2005 with Duncan's help, and called him "the most brilliant legal mind in Angola". He taught a two-hour law class to 35 inmates every Saturday morning for 15 years. (Note: Duncan's memoir says the law class started in 1994, which would mean 17 years, and was on Saturday afternoons.) Professional lawyers, including Katherine Mattes, later a law professor at Tulane University, would go to him for advice.

Duncan could not help his own case though, and like many inmates could not even afford access to his own case documents; each page of legal document cost $1–3, and sometimes records could be thousands of pages. Duncan's only source of money was a prison wage of 20 cents per hour and payment for selling his blood plasma. With that money he hired an investigator, who took the money but did not do the work. Over the years imprisoned, Duncan filed multiple petitions for a new trial and writs of habeas corpus. All were denied.

Duncan's work inside the prison inspired the 2001 creation of the Innocence Project New Orleans, a nonprofit law firm focusing on supporting convicted inmates; Tulane law student Emily Bolton was gathering records for Duncan and fellow Angola inmates, and formalized the project after she graduated. In 2003, the Project took up Duncan's own case, finding evidence that he was not guilty of the crime. They found that the eyewitness's description of the gunman differed from Duncan, that one of the Oregon interviewing detectives was convicted of a felony, and that he had told Duncan the incriminating facts that they later testified he told them. It took almost eight more years before he was released from Angola, on January 7, 2011. While still maintaining his innocence of the murder, Duncan pled guilty to manslaughter and attempted armed robbery in exchange for being released after time served. He had been imprisoned for 28 and a half years, had been a paralegal for 23 of them, worked with prisoners on death row for 19, and taught law classes for 15 and GED classes for seven. When he left the prison, he was given a check for $10, and his prison clothes, the shoes of which were so rotted that he walked carrying one in his hand. Duncan still had the $10 check in 2025.

== Post-release activism ==
After his 2011 release from prison, Duncan worked as a paralegal at the Louisiana Capital Appeals Project, a nonprofit representing prisoners sentenced to capital punishment. In 2013, Duncan was named a Soros Justice Fellow for his work helping prisoners get access to legal records. Duncan used the award to create and direct the Light of Justice program, working to protect prisoners' rights, based first at The Promise of Justice Initiative, then at the Jesuit Social Research Institute at Loyola University.

For the first two years after his release Duncan lived in transitional housing, until in 2013 a childhood friend bought him an abandoned and mostly gutted 120-year-old house, which he renovated with help from Common Ground Relief. Every year he would offer a spare room in that house to a different exoneree to live in for free. In 2014, Duncan co-founded The First 72+, a transition program for former prisoners, named for the most critical stage of reentry, the first 72 hours after release. In 2015, he co-founded Rising Foundations, an organization to help former prisoners receive housing and employment. For this and other work he received the 2015 Echoing Green Black Male Achievement Fellowship.

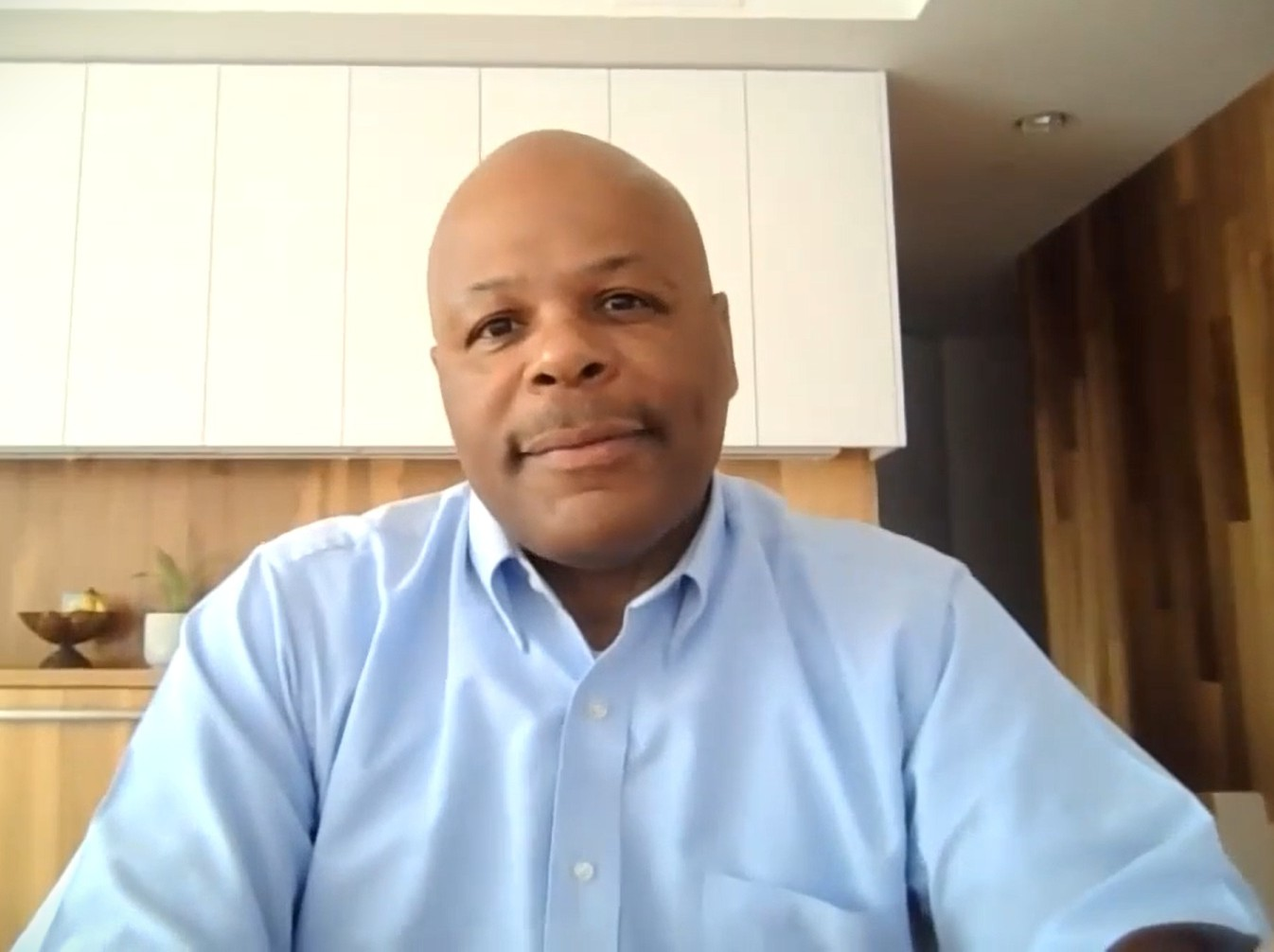
Duncan speaks to Yale Law School in 2021

In 2022, Duncan and Marcus Kondkar, professor of sociology at Loyola University New Orleans, co-founded The Visiting Room Project, of video interviews with inmates in Angola serving life without parole sentences. More than 70% of the prisoners in Angola are serving such sentences, and more than 70% are black. This is the largest such collection of interviews in the world. Over 100 interviews were conducted over two years, initially by both Duncan and Kondkar, then only by Kondkar, since Duncan knew so many of the inmates personally that they were reluctant to show weakness in front of him.

=== Split-verdict criminal juries ===
In 1898, in reaction to the Supreme Court of the United States ruling in Strauder v. West Virginia forbidding black people to be excluded from juries, Louisiana held a constitutional convention, changing the law to only requiring nine out of 12 jurors to convict defendants of serious felonies. This was unique in America at the time. This would allow the votes of that minority which could not be excluded altogether to at least be ignored. Thomas Jenkins Semmes, former Confederate Senator and head of the convention judiciary committee, stated the goal of the change was "to establish the supremacy of the white race in this State to the extent to which it could be legally and Constitutionally done." Oregon adopted a similar law in the 1930s under the influence of the local Ku Klux Klan, after a Jewish man accused of murdering a local Protestant was only convicted of manslaughter when one juror dissented.

In 1972, Louisiana and Oregon were still the only states that allowed non-unanimous verdicts in criminal cases, and their practice was upheld by the Supreme Court in two cases, Apodaca v. Oregon and Johnson v. Louisiana. In 1974, the Louisiana constitution was changed to require 10 out of 12 jury votes.

While working for his fellow prisoners at the Angola law library, Duncan found that often the ones he thought were innocent were convicted despite the votes of one or two of their jurors. While this did not affect Duncan's case, since he was convicted unanimously, he still thought this law was unfair, and could be challenged. Both while imprisoned and after release, Duncan worked on multiple Supreme Court appeals of the law, 22 petitions between 2013 and 2019, each appeal refused. Others joined him; The Advocate newspaper won a 2019 Pulitzer Prize for their 2018 series on the subject, including Duncan's contributions.

In November 2018, Louisiana voters passed a state constitutional amendment to change the law and require unanimous verdicts starting in 2019. In March 2019, on Duncan's 23rd petition, the Supreme Court finally agreed to hear the case Ramos v. Louisiana questioning this law. The state argued against the Ramos petition, saying that the November voter decision made Supreme Court review less important; advocates instead said the November decision may have been what persuaded the Court to finally accept the petition. On April 12, 2020, the Supreme Court decided that non-unanimous criminal trial jury verdicts were unconstitutional.

== Exoneration ==
A 2021 Louisiana law allowed persons who had pled guilty to still challenge their convictions if they had evidence of innocence. On August 3, 2021, two days after the law took effect, Duncan's conviction was vacated given the state's suppression of evidence, and the state dismissed the charges. Duncan says that was the second-best day of his life, the very best being the day he was released in 2011.

== Law school ==
Within a week of his 2011 release from prison, Duncan was at the Tulane University campus, trying to enroll for a degree that would allow him to formally study law. He missed the deadline for the spring term, but enrolled for the fall. He continued his legal studies while working full time, pursuing a formal 4 year paralegal degree at Tulane University, with the eventual goal of law school. He earned an Associate of Arts from Tulane in June 2017, then graduated from Tulane University School of Professional Advancement with a Bachelor of Arts in General Legal Studies in 2019.

In 2020, Duncan entered Lewis & Clark Law School in Oregon, and graduated on May 20, 2023, with a Juris Doctor degree at the age of 60. In 2024, Duncan was an adjunct instructor at Tulane School of Professional Advancement teaching Criminal Law (and in 2025 also Legal Research).

== The Jailhouse Lawyer ==
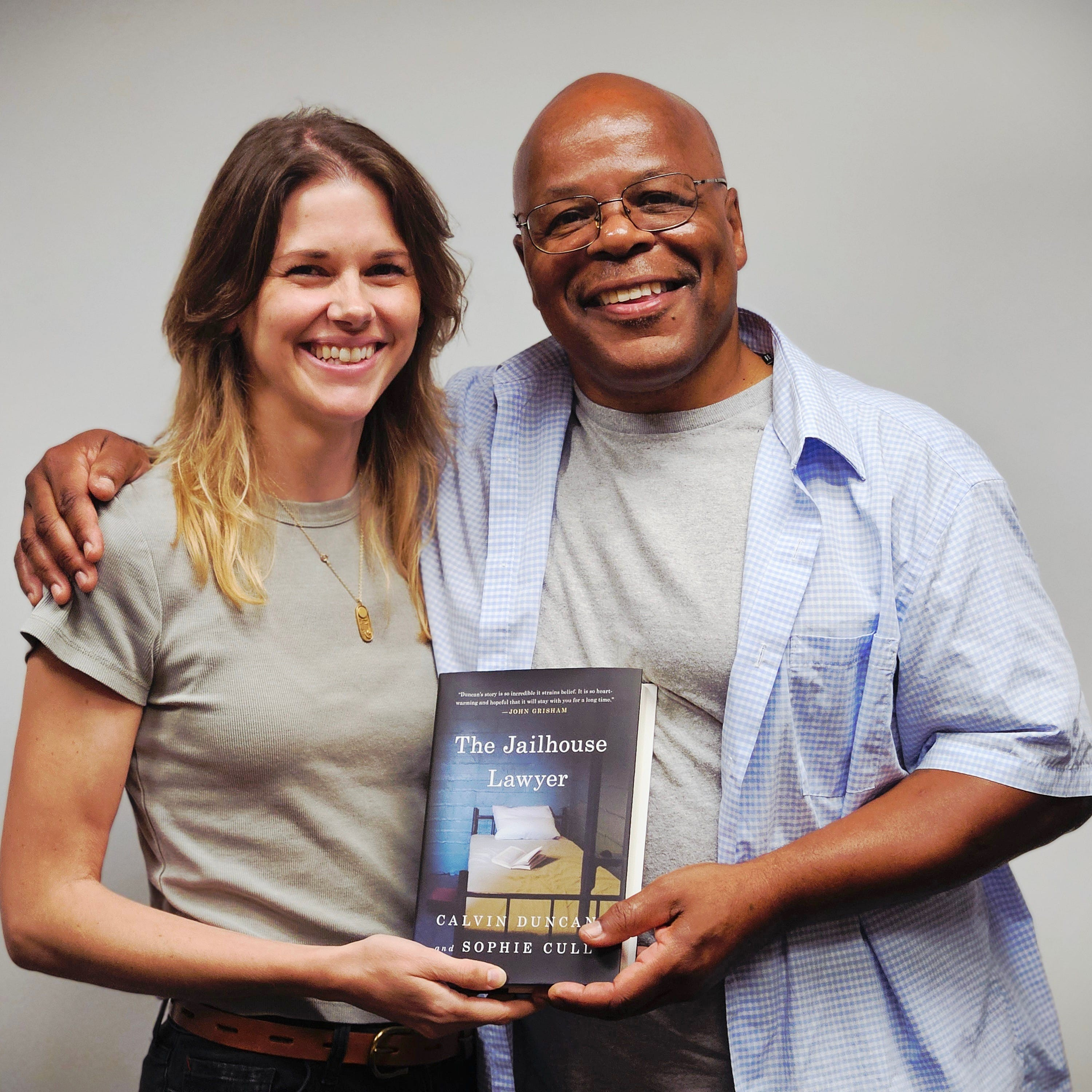
Cull and Duncan with The Jailhouse Lawyer in 2025

Duncan's memoir, The Jailhouse Lawyer, co-authored with Sophie Cull, was published on July 8, 2025 (Penguin Random House, ISBN 978-0593834305). Cull is an activist from Australia who relocated to the United States inspired by Sister Helen Prejean's book Dead Man Walking. She met Duncan through the Capital Appeals Project, listened to his stories on long car rides to Shreveport, Louisiana, where they went to protest a Confederate monument that stood in front of the courthouse, and co-founded the Visiting Room Project with Duncan and Kondkar. Legal author John Grisham said about the book: "If I created a fictional character like Calvin Duncan, no one would believe him". The book made the USA Today bestseller list.

== Clerk of Criminal Court ==
In the 2025 New Orleans elections, Duncan ran for Clerk of the Orleans Parish Criminal District Court, the office that, he says, had denied him access to the trial records of his own conviction that he needed to prove his innocence. New Orleans/Orleans Parish was the only parish in Louisiana that had not digitized its court records from paper form, and in August court records were discarded into a landfill, leading to calls for an investigation.

The election was Duncan's first political race. His main opponent was incumbent Darren Lombard; both were African American Democrats. Lombard was endorsed by New Orleans mayor Helena Moreno, US representative Troy Carter, and The Times-Picayune newspaper, and seemed likely to win easily. Lombard – backed by a letter from Louisiana Attorney General Liz Murrill, a white Republican – claimed in debates, advertisements, and media appearances that Duncan was guilty of the 1981 murder, despite being exonerated by a judge, listed on the National Registry of Exonerations, and having a letter endorsing the exoneration signed by 160 lawyers and legal experts; this claim backfired. It turned a race for a bureaucratic, technical office into one of the most-watched races in the city. Duncan led the three-person October 11 primary with 47% to Lombard's 46%; then won the November 15 runoff against Lombard with 68% of the vote. Duncan was scheduled to be sworn in as clerk in May 2026.

=== Efforts to eliminate the position ===
In the 2026 Regular Legislative Session, Republican State Senator Jay Morris introduced Senate Bill 256 which would eliminate the position of the Criminal District Clerk of Court, effective August 1, 2026, with its duties to be absorbed by the Civil District Clerk of Court. Senator Morris represented Louisiana's 35th State Senate district, 200 to 300 miles from Orleans Parish, and introduced the bill under instruction from Governor Jeff Landry. Senator Morris did not speak to Duncan or any legislators who represented Orleans Parish prior to filing the bill. The current Civil District Clerk of Court, Chelsey Richard Napoleon, spoke in the legislative committee meetings to express her concerns and opposition to this bill, and the effects it would have on her office. After learning that this would shorten Duncan's term, which is not allowed under the Louisiana Constitution, Senator Morris amended his bill on the Senate floor to become effective upon the Governor's signature, and pushed the bill through the legislature to get it to the Governor prior to Duncan beginning his term on May 4, 2026.

On April 21, 2026, Duncan took his ceremonial oath of office on the Orleans Parish Criminal District Court steps. On May 3, U.S. District Court for the Middle District of Louisiana Judge John deGravelles ruled SB256 unconstitutional and blocked the state from eliminating Duncan's elected position. Prompted by the request of Louisiana Attorney General Murrill, the order was then stayed by the U.S. Fifth Circuit Court of Appeals. Duncan arrived to take office on Monday May 4, but left later that day, upon being informed of the appeals decision. The appeals court decision was upheld by a split Louisiana Supreme Court, in a 4–3 decision on June 1.

On May 11, New Orleans city council moved to interpret SB256 as merging two existing positions into a new office of Clerk of Court, requiring an interim appointment and special election, with both Duncan and Napoleon displaced from the positions to which they had been elected, and eligible to run again in the interim election. Murrill disputed that interpretation, and sent the mayor and city councillors letters warning them not to do anything that would remove Napoleon from office, at risk of losing their own jobs. On July 2, a New Orleans jury indicted Murrill for intimidation of public officials, a move stayed by the Louisiana Supreme Court.
