= Unanimity =

Agreement by all people in a situation

Unanimity is agreement by all people in a given situation. Groups may consider unanimous decisions as a sign of social, political or procedural agreement, solidarity, and unity. Unanimity may be assumed explicitly after a unanimous vote or implicitly by a lack of objections.

== Voting ==
Practice varies as to whether a vote can be considered unanimous if some voter abstains. In Robert's Rules of Order, a "unanimous vote" is not specifically defined, although an abstention is not counted as a vote regardless of the voting threshold. Also in this book, action could be taken by "unanimous consent", or "general consent", if there are no objections raised. However, unanimous consent may not necessarily be the same as a unanimous vote (see Not the same as unanimous vote). In either case, it does not take into account the members who were not present.

In contrast, a United Nations Security Council resolution is not considered "unanimous" if a member abstains. In the European Union, the Treaty of Amsterdam introduced the concept of "constructive abstention", where a member can abstain in a vote where unanimity is required without thereby blocking the success of the vote. This is intended to allow states to symbolically withhold support while not paralysing decision-making.

=== Democracies ===
The occurrence of unanimity in a representative democracy can be elusive with the diversity and variety of opinions in a participatory democracy. Unanimity is often a political endeavor. Although governments and international organizations may occasionally achieve unanimous decisions, popular consent is most often a more achievable aspiration for elected officials.

=== Dictatorships ===
The legitimacy supposedly established by unanimity has been used by dictatorial regimes in an attempt to gain support for their position. Participants in a legislature may be coerced or intimidated into supporting the position of a dictator, with the legislature becoming little more than a rubber stamp for a more powerful authority.

One-party states can restrict nominees to one per seat in elections and use compulsory voting or electoral fraud to create an impression of popular unanimity. The 1962 North Korean parliamentary election reported a 100% turnout and a 100% vote for the Workers' Party of Korea. 100% votes have also been claimed by Ahmed Sékou Touré in Guinea in 1974 and 1982, Félix Houphouët-Boigny in Côte d'Ivoire in 1985, and Saddam Hussein in Iraq in 2002.

=== Juries ===
In criminal law jury trials, many jurisdictions require a guilty verdict by a jury to be unanimous. This is not so in civil law jury trials.

The United States Supreme Court ruled in Ramos v. Louisiana (2020) that the Sixth Amendment to the Constitution mandates unanimity in all federal and state criminal jury trials. This overturned Apodaca v. Oregon, which held that the Due Process Clause of the Fourteenth Amendment did not require jury unanimity in state courts, with a concurring opinion that the Sixth Amendment to the Constitution mandates unanimity for a guilty verdict in a federal court jury trial. Many U.S. state constitutions have their own provisions requiring jury unanimity for a finding of guilty; for example, article 21 of the Maryland Constitution's Declaration of Rights states:

That in all criminal prosecutions, every man hath a right to be informed of the accusation against him; to have a copy of the Indictment, or charge, in due time (if required) to prepare for his defence; to be allowed counsel; to be confronted with the witnesses against him; to have process for his witnesses; to examine the witnesses for and against him on oath; and to a speedy trial by an impartial jury, without whose unanimous consent he ought not to be found guilty.

In England and Wales, since the Juries Act 1974, a guilty verdict may be returned where not more than 2 jurors dissent.

== See also ==
- Consensus decision-making
- Liberum veto
- Unanimous consent
- Unanimous fairness
