= Kirby v. Illinois =

- Supreme Court of the United States

Argued November 11, 1971 Decided June 7, 1972
- Full case name: Thomas Kirby v. State of Illinois
- Citations: 406 U.S. 682 (more) 92 S.Ct. 1877; 32 L. Ed. 2d 411

Case history
- Prior: Defendants convicted, Cook County, Illinois Circuit Court; affirmed, Appellate Court of Illinois, First District, 121 Ill. App. 2d 323 (1971); cert. granted, 402 U.S. 995 (1971).

Holding
- Pre-indictment showup without counsel was not a violation of the Sixth Amendment right to counsel because the criminal prosecution had not yet begun.

Court membership
- Chief Justice Warren E. Burger Associate Justices William O. Douglas · William J. Brennan Jr. Potter Stewart · Byron White; Thurgood Marshall · Harry Blackmun; Lewis F. Powell Jr. · William Rehnquist

Case opinions
- Plurality: Stewart, joined by Burger, Blackmun, Rehnquist
- Concurrence: Burger
- Concurrence: Powell (in result)
- Dissent: Brennan, joined by Douglas, Marshall
- Dissent: White

Laws applied
- U.S. Const. amend. VI

Kirby v. Illinois, 406 U.S. 682 (1972), was a case decided by the Supreme Court of the United States that held that the Sixth Amendment right to counsel did not attach during a pre-indictment identification.

== Factual background ==
On February 21, 1968, in Chicago, Willie Shard reported to police that he was robbed by two men that had taken his wallet. The wallet contained his Social Security card and traveler's checks. On February 22, 1968, police stopped Thomas Kirby and Ralph Bean and asked for identification. Kirby produced a Social Security card bearing the name Willie Shard, and police noticed he also carried traveler's checks. Kirby said he won them in a game, but he and Bean were arrested and taken to the police station.

Shard was brought to the police station, and upon seeing Kirby and Bean seated at a table identified them as the men who robbed him. Kirby and Bean did not have counsel present, and they had not been advised of their rights. Kirby and Bean were indicted six weeks later for the robbery of Shard, where they were appointed counsel. A pretrial motion by Kirby to exclude the police station identification was denied. A jury convicted both defendants of robbery. Kirby's conviction was affirmed on appeal, where the Illinois appellate court held that the Supreme Court precedents United States v. Wade and Gilbert v. California did not require exclusion of the identification because it was made before the indictment. The Supreme Court granted certiorari to determine if Kirby had a right to counsel at that pre-indictment showup identification.

== Judgment of the Court ==
=== Plurality opinion ===
In a plurality opinion joined by Chief Justice Burger and Justices Blackmun and Rehnquist, Justice Stewart held that Kirby did not have a Sixth Amendment right to counsel at the showup because it occurred before the beginning of the criminal prosecution. The Court observed that Powell v. Alabama, 287 U.S. 45, held that the Sixth Amendment right to counsel only attaches during the criminal prosecution. A pre-indictment showup, however, could not be considered within the formal realm of the criminal proceeding, because it was a routine police procedure and not a situation where the suspect is faced with "the prosecutorial forces of organized society."

The plurality observed that other protections were available to criminal suspects at the pre-indictment identification stage, and that identifications could be excluded on a case-by-case basis if they were overly suggestive according to Stovall v. Denno.

=== Burger's concurrence ===
Chief Justice Burger's concurrence asserted that a criminal prosecution only begins once charges are formally filed against a defendant, and because that had not yet happened by the time of the identification here, Kirby had no constitutional right to counsel.

=== Powell's concurrence ===
Justice Powell concurred because he did not want to extend the exclusionary rule of the Gilbert-Wade doctrine.

=== Brennan's dissent ===
In a dissent joined by Justices Douglas and Marshall, Justice Brennan argued that Gilbert and Wade compelled a right to counsel during the pre-indictment lineup. Brennan focused on the reasoning of Wade, noting that a pre-indictment identification without counsel seriously compromised a defendant's ability to effectively defend himself. For the same reasons that a post-indictment lineup presented risks of suggestivity and unfairness, so too did a pre-indictment showup. A pre-indictment showup was also as difficult for a defendant to reconstruct at trial as a post-indictment lineup.

Brennan criticized the plurality's reliance on the abstract concept of the beginning of a criminal prosecution instead of examining the realities of the prejudice faced by an uncounseled criminal defendant. Brennan also rejected the idea that Stovall provided a different standard of protection - the events in Stovall occurred before Wade and Gilbert were decided, so Wade and Gilbert were simply not applied to the facts of Stovall retroactively.

=== White's dissent ===
Justice White wrote a separate dissent, asserting that Wade and Gilbert controlled, and that the lower court should be reversed.

== See also ==
- List of United States Supreme Court cases, volume 406
