= Total immunity =

Total immunity is a form of legal immunity that is all encompassing and may refer to:

- Absolute immunity, immunity for government officials that confers total immunity from criminal prosecution and lawsuits
- Witness immunity, immunity conferred upon a witness, can be transactional (total) or use and derivative use immunity (partial)
