= Stovall v. Denno =

- Supreme Court of the United States

Argued February 16, 1967 Decided June 12, 1967
- Full case name: Theodore Stovall v. Wilfred Denno, Warden
- Citations: 388 U.S. 293 (more) 87 S. Ct. 1967; 18 L. Ed. 2d 1199

Case history
- Prior: Defendant convicted; affirmed, New York Court of Appeals, 13 N.Y.2d 1094 (1963); habeas corpus petition denied, 355 F.2d 731 (2d Cir. 1966); cert granted, 384 U.S. 1000 (1966).

Holding
- A pre-trial identification made in the absence of counsel but not violating the Sixth Amendment should be excluded if it is so unnecessarily suggestive as to violate due process.

Court membership
- Chief Justice Earl Warren Associate Justices Hugo Black · William O. Douglas; Tom C. Clark · John M. Harlan II; William J. Brennan Jr. · Potter Stewart; Byron White · Abe Fortas

Case opinions
- Majority: Brennan, joined by Warren, Clark, Harlan, Stewart, White
- Concurrence: White, joined by Harlan, Stewart
- Dissent: Douglas
- Dissent: Fortas
- Dissent: Black

Laws applied
- U.S. Const. amend. VI, U.S. Const. amend. XIV

Stovall v. Denno, 388 U.S. 293 (1967), was a case decided by the Supreme Court of the United States that held that a pretrial identification not covered by the Sixth Amendment right to counsel should be excluded if it was so unnecessarily suggestive as to violate due process.

== Factual background ==
Dr. Paul Behrendt was stabbed to death on August 23, 1961, at his home in Garden City, New York. Dr. Behrendt's wife was injured in the attack. A shirt and keys left at the scene led to Theodore Stovall's arrest on August 24, 1961. After Mrs. Behrendt underwent surgery, Stovall was brought to her hospital room on the afternoon of August 25, 1961. Stovall had not yet been appointed counsel. Mrs. Behrendt identified Stovall as her attacker. Stovall was convicted and sentenced to death. The New York Court of Appeals affirmed Stovall's conviction.

Stovall filed a petition of habeas corpus, alleging that his Fifth, Sixth, and Fourteenth Amendment rights were violated. The Southern District of New York dismissed his petition, and Stovall appealed to the Second Circuit. A three judge panel reversed Stovall's conviction on the basis that Mrs. Behrendt's identification was made in violation of Stovall's Sixth Amendment right to counsel. The Second Circuit reheard the case en banc and affirmed the district court's dismissal of Stovall's petition. The Supreme Court granted certiorari.

== Decision ==
=== Majority opinion ===
Stovall was decided on the same day as United States v. Wade and Gilbert v. California, two cases dealing with the Sixth Amendment right to counsel in pretrial stages. The Court observed that the rule of Wade, where the absence of counsel at a post-indictment lineup was held to be a violation of the Sixth Amendment, would dictate the finding of a Sixth Amendment violation in the present case. The Court, however, held that the rule of Wade should not be applied retroactively. The Court noted that police departments had relied on Sixth Amendment jurisprudence as it was before Wade, and that the absence of counsel at the identification did not jeopardize Stovall's right to a fair trial seriously enough to justify retroactive application.

Even without application of the Wade rule, Stovall could prevail if he could show that his due process rights under the Fourteenth Amendment were violated. The due process test as described by the Court was that Stovall could prevail if the identification procedure was "so unnecessarily suggestive and conducive to irreparable mistaken identification that he was denied due process of law." The Court held that the identification procedure, though suggestive, was necessary because of Mrs. Behrendt's injured state and affirmed Stovall's conviction.

=== Douglas' dissent in part ===
Justice Douglas dissented from the Court's refusal to retroactively apply the rule of Wade to find a Sixth Amendment violation.

=== Fortas' dissent ===
Justice Fortas asserted that the identification of Stovall was a violation of due process rights and that the case should be reversed and remanded. Fortas would not have reached the issue of the retroactive application of Wade.

=== White's concurrence in part ===
Justice White, joined by Justices Harlan and Stewart, wrote separately to emphasize that there was no Sixth Amendment violation.

=== Black's dissent ===
Justice Black dissented from the Court's refusal to retroactively apply Wade. Black also dissented from the Court's holding that a defendant can mount a due process challenge to their conviction in the absence of a violation of a specific Amendment. Black would reverse and remand to determine if the admission of the lineup without counsel was harmless error.

== Subsequent history ==
The holding of Stovall that refused to apply the rule of Wade retroactively was overruled in Griffith v. Kentucky.

== Impact ==
Until its overruling in Griffith, Stovall, along with the case Linkletter v. Walker, established a three factor test for determining if a law should be applied retroactively that examined purpose, reliance, and effect. Lawyers, judges, and academics fashioned rules based on the Linkletter/Stovall test to encourage predictability and fairness in the retroactive application of new precedents.

== See also ==
- United States v. Wade
- Gilbert v. California
- List of United States Supreme Court cases, volume 388
