= Anthony Snaer =

American sugar grower and politician

Anthony L. Snaer was a sugar grower and a state legislator in Louisiana. He represented Iberia Parish in the Louisiana House of Representatives from 1872 to 1879. He also served as tax collector and assessor.

He served in the United States Colored Infantry and was an appointed official with the Bureau of Refugees, Freedmen, and Abandoned Lands in Louisiana.

Snaer represented Saint Martin Parish at the Louisiana Constitutional Convention of 1868.
