= Aikens v. California =

- Supreme Court of the United States

Argued January 17, 1972 Decided June 7, 1972
- Full case name: Earnest James Aikens, Jr. v. People of the State of California
- Citations: 406 U.S. 813 (more) 92 S. Ct. 1931; 32 L. Ed. 2d 511; 1972 U.S. LEXIS 52

Case history
- Prior: Crim. No. 10118 February 18, 1969: 70 Cal. 2d 369, 450 P.2d 258; Certiorari dismissed (406 U.S. 813)
- Subsequent: Death sentence converted to Life in Prison

Holding
- Since petitioner no longer faces execution, his appeal is moot.

Court membership
- Chief Justice Warren E. Burger Associate Justices William O. Douglas · William J. Brennan Jr. Potter Stewart · Byron White; Thurgood Marshall · Harry Blackmun; Lewis F. Powell Jr. · William Rehnquist

Case opinion
- Per curiam

Aikens v. California, 406 U.S. 813 (1972), was a decision of the United States Supreme Court where a petitioner (in the U.S. Supreme Court, the plaintiff (Aikens) is called the petitioner and the defendant (the State of California) is called the respondent) was appealing his conviction and death sentence. After oral argument had been made on the case, but before the court decided on it, the Supreme Court of California in People v. Anderson, declared the death penalty unconstitutional under the state constitution. This made his appeal unnecessary because the decision in Anderson

declared capital punishment in California unconstitutional under Art. 1, 6, of the state constitution... The California Supreme Court declared in the Anderson case that its decision was fully retroactive and stated that any prisoner currently under sentence of death could petition a superior court to modify its judgment. [Aikens] thus no longer faces a realistic threat of execution... [emphasis added]

The Supreme Court would decide later that year, in Furman v. Georgia, that the Death Penalty was under certain circumstances unconstitutional. Aikens was originally one of four cases that were selected along with Furman, but when the Anderson case was decided by the California Supreme Court, Aikens became moot.

== See also ==
- List of United States Supreme Court cases, volume 406
