= United States v. Wade =

- Supreme Court of the United States

Argued February 16, 1967 Decided June 12, 1967
- Full case name: United States v. Billy Joe Wade
- Citations: 388 U.S. 218 (more) 87 S. Ct. 1926; 18 L. Ed. 2d 1149; 1967 U.S. LEXIS 1085

Case history
- Prior: Defendant convicted, United States District Court for the Eastern District of Texas; reversed, 358 F.2d 557 (5th Cir. 1966); cert granted, 87 S.Ct. 81 (1966)

Holding
- A post-indictment lineup in the absence of counsel was a violation of the Sixth Amendment.

Court membership
- Chief Justice Earl Warren Associate Justices Hugo Black · William O. Douglas; Tom C. Clark · John M. Harlan II; William J. Brennan Jr. · Potter Stewart; Byron White · Abe Fortas

Case opinions
- Majority: Brennan, joined by Clark (in full); Warren, Douglas, Fortas (all but Part I); Harlan, Stewart, White (Parts I and III)
- Concurrence: Clark
- Concur/dissent: Warren
- Concur/dissent: Black
- Concur/dissent: Douglas
- Concur/dissent: White, joined by Harlan, Stewart
- Concur/dissent: Fortas, joined by Warren, Douglas

Laws applied
- U.S. Const. amend. VI

United States v. Wade, 388 U.S. 218 (1967), was a case decided by the Supreme Court of the United States that held that a criminal defendant has a Sixth Amendment right to counsel at a lineup held after indictment.

== Factual background ==
On September 21, 1964, a bank in Eustace, Texas was robbed while two employees were inside. On March 23, 1965, Billy Joe Wade and two others were indicted for robbing the bank. Wade was arrested on April 2, 1965, and counsel was appointed to represent him on April 26. Two weeks later an FBI agent arranged a lineup at the county courthouse that consisted of Wade and five or six other prisoners. Wade did not have counsel present, and the two bank employees identified Wade as the robber.

At trial the bank employees identified Wade as the robber. The employees were cross-examined about the nature of the previous lineup. The defense moved for acquittal, arguing that the lineup was a violation of the Fifth and Sixth Amendments. The trial court denied the motion, and Wade was convicted. The Fifth Circuit reversed Wade's conviction, holding that the lineup in the absence of counsel was a violation of the Sixth Amendment. The Supreme Court granted certiorari.

== Decision ==
=== Majority opinion ===
In Part I, not a part of the opinion because of the limited concurrence of Chief Justice Warren and Justice Douglas, Justice Brennan held that the lineup was not a violation of Wade's Fifth Amendment right against self incrimination.

The majority, however, observed that the Sixth Amendment right to counsel could be violated even in the absence of a Fifth Amendment violation. To safeguard a criminal defendant's right to a fair trial, counsel must be present at the critical stages of the prosecution. The Court disputed the Government's characterization of the lineup as a preliminary stage, like the analysis of fingerprints, where counsel is not required.

The Court noted that the lack of counsel at the lineup posed a risk of substantial prejudice to the defendant. Lineups could be very suggestive, and the uncounseled defendant would face serious difficulty in addressing any problems through cross-examination at trial because he would be unable to observe police action during the lineup. The Court also dismissed the contention that the presence of defense counsel would disrupt the activities of prosecutors. Instead, the presence of defense counsel would remove any taint of unfairness associated with the evidence. The Court noted that future regulation of pretrial stages with the adoption of police codes and other safeguards of fairness might render a stage not critical and vitiate the constitutional need for counsel.

Regarding the case at hand, the Court held that violation of the counsel requirement did not necessitate reversal of the conviction. The conviction could be upheld if the prosecution could show by clear and convincing evidence that the in court identification of Wade as the robber was based on the witnesses' observations of him during the crime. The Court vacated the decision of the Fifth Circuit and remanded to the trial court for further proceedings.

=== Clark's concurrence ===
Justice Clark observed that the conclusion that the post-indictment lineup was a critical stage of the prosecution was inevitable given precedents like Miranda v. Arizona.

=== Black's concurrence in part and dissent in part ===
Justice Black dissented from the holding that dismissed Wade's Fifth Amendment claim. Black asserted that being compelled to stand in a lineup is testimonial in the same sense as being called as a witness at trial. Black agreed that the absence of counsel at the lineup was a violation of the Sixth Amendment. Black, however, thought such a violation demanded automatic reversal of Wade's conviction, and that the prosecution should not be given the chance to show that the in court identification was based on other evidence.

=== White's concurrence in part and dissent in part ===
Justice White agreed that there was no Fifth Amendment violation, but criticized the Court's Sixth Amendment analysis. White feared that the rigid rule of the majority would limit more nuanced, effective, and practical solutions at the state level.

=== Fortas' concurrence in part and dissent in part ===
Justice Fortas agreed that it was not a Fifth Amendment violation for Wade to stand in the lineup, but that having each person in the lineup repeat words spoken by the robber during the robbery was a violation. Fortas agreed that the absence of counsel at the lineup was a Sixth Amendment violation.

== Impact ==
In response to Wade, police departments began to enact regulations to ensure the presence of defense counsel during lineups. Hearings regarding the validity of police lineups are called "Wade hearings".

In Kirby v. Illinois, the Supreme Court held that the absence of counsel at a pre-indictment lineup was not a violation of the Sixth Amendment. Because most lineups occur before indictment, Kirby has been seen as an effective overruling of Wade.

== See also ==
- Gilbert v. California
- List of United States Supreme Court cases, volume 388
