= List of United States Supreme Court cases, volume 406 =

This is a list of all United States Supreme Court cases from volume 406 of the United States Reports:

Case name	Citation	Date decided
S&E Contractors, Inc. v. United States	406 U.S. 1	1972
Illinois v. City of Milwaukee	406 U.S. 91	1972
Washington v. Gen. Motors Corp.	406 U.S. 109	1972
Nebraska v. Iowa	406 U.S. 117	1972
Affiliated Ute Citizens v. United States	406 U.S. 128	1972
Weber v. Aetna Cas. & Sur. Co.	406 U.S. 164	1972
Vermont v. New York	406 U.S. 186	1972
Minn. State Senate v. Beens	406 U.S. 187	1972
Wisconsin v. Yoder	406 U.S. 205	1972
Dukes v. Warden	406 U.S. 250	1972
NLRB v. Burns Int'l Security Services, Inc.	406 U.S. 272	1972
United States v. Biswell	406 U.S. 311	1972
Andrews v. Louisville & N.R.R. Co.	406 U.S. 320	1972
Huffman v. Boersen	406 U.S. 337	1972
Atl. Coast Line R.R. Co. v. Erie Lackawanna R.R. Co.	406 U.S. 340	1972
Strait v. Laird	406 U.S. 341	1972
Johnson v. Louisiana	406 U.S. 356	1972
Apodaca v. Oregon	406 U.S. 404	1972
Caplin v. Marine Midland Grace Tr. Co.	406 U.S. 416	1972
Kastigar v. United States	406 U.S. 441	1972
Zicarelli v. N.J. Comm'n of Investigation	406 U.S. 472	1972
Sarno v. Ill. Crime Investigating Comm'n	406 U.S. 482	1972
Utah v. United States	406 U.S. 484	1972
Operating Engineers v. Flair Builders, Inc.	406 U.S. 487	1972
Lake Carriers' Ass'n v. MacMullan	406 U.S. 498	1972
Deepsouth Packing Co. v. Laitram Corp.	406 U.S. 518	1972
Jefferson v. Hackney	406 U.S. 535	1972
Socialist Labor Party v. Gilligan	406 U.S. 583	1972
Carleson v. Remillard	406 U.S. 598	1972
Brooks v. Tennessee	406 U.S. 605	1972
FPC v. La. Power & Light Co.	406 U.S. 621	1972
United States v. Midwest Video Corp.	406 U.S. 649	1972
Kirby v. Illinois	406 U.S. 682	1972
Brunette Machine Works, Ltd. v. Kockum Industries, Inc.	406 U.S. 706	1972
Jackson v. Indiana	406 U.S. 715	1972
United States v. Allegheny-Ludlum Steel Corp.	406 U.S. 742	1972
First Nat'l City Bank v. Banco Nacional	406 U.S. 759	1972
Laird v. Nelms	406 U.S. 797	1972
Aikens v. California	406 U.S. 813	1972
