= Johnson v. Louisiana =

- Supreme Court of the United States

Argued March 1, 1971 Reargued January 10, 1972 Decided May 22, 1972
- Full case name: Frank Johnson, Petitioner v. Louisiana
- Docket no.: 69-5035
- Citations: 406 U.S. 356 (more) 92 S.Ct. 1620, 32 L.Ed.2d 152
- Argument: Oral argument
- Reargument: Reargument
- Opinion announcement: Opinion announcement

Case history
- Prior: The defendant, Frank Johnson, convicted of armed robbery by a 9-3 jury and sentenced.; 255 La. 314, 230 So.2d 825, affirmed.

Questions presented
- Do less-than-unanimous jury verdicts in certain cases violate the Due Process and Equal Protection Clauses of the Fourteenth Amendment?

Holding
- The Louisiana law that allowed a defendant to be convicted of a felon without a unanimous jury does not violate the equal protection clause and the Due Process Clause of the Fourteenth Amendment to the United States Constitution for failure to satisfy the reasonable doubt standard.

Court membership
- Chief Justice Warren E. Burger Associate Justices William O. Douglas · William J. Brennan Jr. Potter Stewart · Byron White; Thurgood Marshall · Harry Blackmun; Lewis F. Powell Jr. · William Rehnquist

Case opinions
- Majority: White, joined by Burger, Blackmun, Powell, Rehnquist
- Concurrence: Blackmun
- Concurrence: Powell
- Dissent: Douglas, joined by Brennan, Marshall
- Dissent: Brennan, joined by Marshall
- Dissent: Stewart, joined by Brennan, Marshall
- Dissent: Marshall, joined by Brennan

Laws applied
- U.S. Const. amends. XIV
- Overruled by
- Ramos v. Louisiana

Johnson v. Louisiana, 406 U. S. 356 (1972), was a court case in the U.S. Supreme Court involving the Due Process Clause and Equal Protection Clause of the Fourteenth Amendment to the United States Constitution. The U.S. Supreme Court ruled that the Louisiana law that allowed less-than unanimous jury verdicts (9 to 12 jurors) to convict persons charged with a felony, does not violate the Due Process clause. This case was argued on a similar basis as Apodaca v. Oregon.

== Background ==
The Fourteenth Amendment to the United States Constitution includes the Due Process Clause and the Equal Protection Clause. These clauses are part of the procedural due process right afforded to United States citizens when the government seeks to limit, restrict or deny a citizen of their "Life, liberty and property".

Despite the Sixth Amendment and the Seventh Amendment to the United States Constitution assuring the right to a jury trial, the states are able to decide the requirements for a conviction of a defendant. At that time, the Louisiana State Constitution and Code of Criminal Procedure allowed for a less-than-unanimous jury to convict a defendant of a crime where hard labor is available as punishment. Under those laws, nine members of a twelve-juror panel were enough to secure the conviction of the accused.

The petitioner for this case, Frank Johnson, was convicted of armed robbery by nine members of a jury of twelve. He sought to overturn his conviction under the Due Process Clause, arguing that the majority of the jury voting for the conviction was unable to do so beyond a reasonable doubt when the minority is arguing for acquittal, that 3 members of the 12 member jury refused to convict him of the crime, and that therefore, there was a reasonable doubt of the conviction. He petitioned the U.S. Supreme Court for review.

== Decision ==
=== Opinion of the court ===
In a 5–4 decision, the court ruled that a non-unanimous jury verdict does not violate the Due Process Clause or the Equal Protection Clause of the Fourteenth Amendment. Authored by Justice Byron White, the opinion was joined by justices Warren E. Burger, Harry Blackmun, Lewis F. Powell Jr. and William Rehnquist. The majority rejected the arguments by the petitioner, reaffirming the preceding ruling by the Supreme Court of Louisiana.

The court rejected the first argument made by the appellant, stating that all juror would have independently excessed the guilt of a defendant and would not have excused the minority's argument while making their decision in the case. Instead, they would have considered their argument and their decision to convict is enhanced due to there being no "reasonable doubt" for them to have reach such a conclusion, therefore such an argument is not excepted by the court.

Justice Byron White stated:

At that juncture there is no basis for denigrating the vote of so large a majority of the jury or for refusing to accept their decision as being, at least in their minds, beyond a reasonable doubt...Appellant offers no evidence that majority jurors simply ignore the reasonable doubts of their colleagues or otherwise act irresponsibly in casting their votes in favor of conviction, and before we alter our own longstanding perceptions about jury behavior and overturn a considered legislative judgment that unanimity is not essential to reasoned jury verdicts, we must have some basis for doing so other than unsupported assumptions.

— Justice Byron White, Johnson v. Louisiana, 406 U. S. 356, 361-362

The court also rejected the second argument made by the appellant, that there having a less-than-unanimous jury verdict insinuates the fact that the jury has a reasonable doubt towards the conviction. The court expressed the respondent's case could have a greater standing if there were more people on the jury to affirm the conviction. However, the vast majority of the jury agreeing to convict the man was sufficient and their decision is not merely invalidated by the dissenting minority, thereby quashing the "reasonable doubt approach" to this case.

Justice Byron White stated:

Of course, the State's proof could perhaps be regarded as more certain if it had convinced all 12 jurors instead of only nine; it would have been even more compelling if it had been required to convince and had, in fact, convinced 24 or 36 jurors. But the fact remains that nine jurors— a substantial majority of the jury—were convinced by the evidence. In our view disagreement of three jurors does not alone establish reasonable doubt, particularly when such a heavy majority of the jury, after having considered the dissenters' views, remains convinced of guilt. That rational men disagree is not in itself equivalent to a failure of proof by the State, nor does it indicate infidelity to the reasonable-doubt standard.

— Justice Bryon White, Johnson v. Louisiana, 406 U. S. 356, 362

Additionally, the appellant also appealed against his conviction under the equal protection clause, pointing towards other capital cases and five-jury verdicts needing a unanimous verdict to convict, unlike his case.

The court similarly reject this, with Justice Bryon White stating:

We conclude, however, that the Louisiana statutory scheme serves a rational purpose and is not subject to constitutional challenge.

— Justice Bryon White, Johnson v. Louisiana, 406 U.S. 356, 363 (1972)

Lastly, the appellant argued that his nighttime, warrantless arrest was unconstitutional under the Fourth Amendment to the United States Constitution, the court rejected the claim as that was not the question presented to the court.

=== Concurrences ===
==== Justice Blackmun's concurrence ====
Justice Blackmun's concurrence highlights him affirming the court decision that the verdict given by the jury is valid, however, he clarifies that he is not in favor of a split-verdict system.

==== Justice Powell's concurrence ====
Justice Powell concurred with the majority that the less-than-unanimous ruling "undercuts the applicable standard of proof in criminal prosecutions in that State." He also rejected the equal protection clause argument based on the fact the state did not discriminate different tiers of defendant as they have a rational basis to do so.

However, justice Powell disagreed on the crux of the argument. He emphasized on the difference between the 6th amendment and 14th amendment right to jury trial.

He wrote:

It therefore seems to me, in accord both with history and precedent, that the Sixth Amendment requires a unanimous jury verdict to convict in a federal criminal trial. But it is the Fourteenth Amendment, rather than the Sixth, that imposes upon the States the requirement that they provide jury trials to those accused of serious crimes. This Court has said, in cases decided when the intendment of that Amendment was not as clouded by the passage of time, that due process does not require that the States apply the federal jury-trial right with all its gloss.

— Justice Lewis Powell, Johnson v. Louisiana, 406 US 356, 371 (1972)

=== Dissents ===
==== Justice Douglas's dissent ====
Justice Douglas dissent that is joined by both justice Brennan and Marshall regards the majority opinion as a "radical departure from American traditions". Justice Douglas dissent acknowledges that the constitution does not specifically mention about the need for juries to be unanimous. However, he relied on past cases such as American Publishing Co. v. Fishers, in which the precedent for all jury verdicts to be unanimous for trial was set and in Andres v. United States where the court held that the bill of rights assured a jury trial.

Justice Douglas signified his disagreement towards the disparities towards civil and criminal juries, questioning:

After today's decisions, a man's property may only be taken away by a unanimous jury vote, yet he can be stripped of his liberty by a lesser standard. How can that result be squared with the law of the land as expressed in the settled and traditional requirements of procedural due process?

— Justice William O. Douglas, Johnson v. Louisiana 406 US 356, 383 (1972)

Justice Douglas also dissented stating that the majority opinion "diminishes the reliability of a jury" as it prevents the minority of jurors to convince the majority to convict/acquit or to urge the majority to convict on a smaller offense, and it disproportionally allows prosecutors in jurisdictions with laws that allow the conviction under a less-than-unanimous charge to have a greater odds of convicting a defendant.

==== Justice Brennan's dissent ====
Justice Brennan dissent which is joined by Justice Marshall, highlighted his view that all members of the jury shall have their voice be heard and a unanimous jury assures such and does not disregard the viewpoints of any juror.

==== Justice Steward's dissent ====
Justice Steward dissent joined by both Justice Brennan and Marshall viewed that it is necessary for a unanimous jury trial as it ensures a fair trial and is the best way of having a jury trial due to its history.

He wrote:

The requirement that the verdict of the jury be unanimous, surely as important as these other constitutional requisites, preserves the jury's function in linking law with contemporary society. It provides the simple and effective method endorsed by centuries of experience and history to combat the injuries to the fair administration of justice that can be inflicted by community passion and prejudice.

— Justice Potter Steward, Johnson v. Louisiana, 406 US 356, 399 (1972)

==== Justice Marshall's dissent ====
Justice Marshall dissent that is joined by Justice Brennan, states that the very fact that a minority of 3 juror not agreeing with the others in regard to the case meant that they were unsuccessfully persuaded by the state, which showed a reasonable doubt. He argued that the state could very well hold a retrial in the case where there is an impasse and that would not violate the double jeopardy clause of the fifth amendment to the United States Constitution. He added his disagreement with the majority that a single juror could be "irrational" when making their decision by stating that the court would have already analyzed the jurors' rationality during voir dire.

== Subsequent cases ==
This law remained on the books until 2018, where the citizens of Louisiana voted for and passed Louisiana Amendment 2 (the Unanimous Jury Verdict for Felony Trial Amendment). This amended Section 17(A) of Article I of the Constitution of Louisiana. This made Louisiana the second last state to have a unanimous jury for conviction in the United States of America.

Louisiana Amendment 2 (2018)
YES votes	NO votes	% of YES Votes	% of NO votes	Outcome
938,182	519,731	64.35%	35.65%	PASSED

The United States Supreme Court eventually overturned this case in 2020. In the case, Ramos v. Louisiana, the court ruled that all criminal conviction needed a unanimous jury.
