= Public figure =

Legal concept relating to fame, prominence, or notoriety of an individual

A public figure is a person who has achieved fame, prominence or notoriety within a society, whether through achievement, luck, action, or in some cases through no purposeful action of their own.

In the context of defamation actions (libel and slander) as well as invasion of privacy, a public figure cannot succeed in a lawsuit on incorrect harmful statements in the United States unless there is proof that the writer or publisher acted with actual malice by knowing the falsity or by reckless disregard for the truth. The legal burden of proof in defamation actions is thus higher in the case of a public figure than in the case of an ordinary person.

The tort of defamation depends on jurisdiction: for example, the law of defamation in England and Wales differs from Scotland or the State of Florida.

== United States ==
The controlling precedent in the United States was set in 1964 by the United States Supreme Court in New York Times Co. v. Sullivan, which is considered a key decision in supporting the First Amendment and freedom of the press.

A fairly high threshold of public activity is necessary to elevate people to a public figure status. They may be:

- A public official or any other person pervasively involved in public affairs
- A limited purpose public figure, which according to Gertz v. Robert Welch, Inc. is a person who has "thrust themselves to the forefront of particular public controversies in order to influence the resolution of the issues involved", or engaged in actions to generate publicity within a narrow area of interest (Note: According to ExpertLaw, activist Terry Rakolta became the target of jokes in a variety of media after urging an advertiser boycott of the TV series Married... with Children. The jokes were "protected by Ms. Rakolta's status as a 'limited public figure'" and considered fair comments "within the confines of her public conduct".)
- An involuntary public figure, an individual who has become a public figure as a result of publicity, although they may or may not have voluntarily sought it out; this can include victims of crime, as well as those who commit crimes or are accused of committing crimes.

Discussion of a person on the Internet may at times rise to the level that it causes the subject of discussion to be treated as an involuntary public figure.

Corporations are not automatically treated as public figures, and defamation claims made by corporations are evaluated under the same standard as those made by individuals.

== See also ==
- Curtis Publishing Co. v. Butts (1967)
- Hustler Magazine v. Falwell (1988)
