= Berger v. New York =

- Supreme Court of the United States

Argued April 13, 1967 Decided June 12, 1967
- Full case name: Ralph Berger v. State of New York
- Citations: 388 U.S. 41 (more) 87 S. Ct. 1873; 18 L. Ed. 2d 1040

Case history
- Prior: Certiorari to the Court of Appeals of New York

Holding
- The Court facially invalidated a New York statute (N.Y. Code of Crim. Proc. § 813-a) which allowed for electronic eavesdropping without the procedural safeguards required by the Fourth Amendment.

Court membership
- Chief Justice Earl Warren Associate Justices Hugo Black · William O. Douglas; Tom C. Clark · John M. Harlan II; William J. Brennan Jr. · Potter Stewart; Byron White · Abe Fortas

Case opinions
- Majority: Clark, joined by Warren, Douglas, Brennan, Fortas
- Concurrence: Douglas
- Concurrence: Stewart
- Dissent: Black
- Dissent: Harlan
- Dissent: White

Laws applied
- U.S. Const. amend. IV

Berger v. New York, 388 U.S. 41 (1967), was a United States Supreme Court decision invalidating a New York law under the Fourth Amendment, because the statute authorized electronic eavesdropping without required procedural safeguards.

== Background ==
Under New York Code of Criminal Procedure § 813-a, police obtained an ex parte order to bug the office of attorney Ralph Berger. Based on evidence obtained by the surveillance, Berger was convicted of conspiracy to bribe a public official. The statute allowed electronic eavesdropping for up to two months upon a standard of "a reasonable ground to believe that evidence of a crime may be thus obtained." Further two-month extensions of the original order could be granted if investigators made a showing that such surveillance would be in the public interest. The statute required neither notice to the person surveilled nor any justification of such secrecy. The communications sought did not have to be described with any particularity; surveillance requests had to identify only the person targeted and the phone number to be tapped. Finally, the statute did not require a return on the warrant, so law enforcement officers did not have to account to a judge for their use of evidence gathered.

== Opinion of the Court ==
In an opinion written by Justice Tom C. Clark, the Supreme Court of the United States ruled that section 813-a violated the Fourth Amendment, made enforceable against the states by the Fourteenth Amendment, because it lacked "adequate judicial supervision [and] protective procedures." Notably, the Court invalidated the law on its face rather than as applied to the petitioner. The Court likened such an indiscriminate grant of authority to search for any evidence of any crime to a general warrant, a tool used by British authorities in colonial America that the Fourth Amendment was enacted to outlaw. The Court held that conversations are protected by the Fourth Amendment, and that the use of electronic devices to capture conversations thus constituted a "search." This holding predates by several months the more famous case of Katz v. United States, which extended Fourth Amendment protection to a conversation in a public phone booth based on the speaker's reasonable expectation of privacy.

== Legacy ==
Academic Colin Agur argues that Berger, along with Katz v. United States, were responses by the Court to police and government abuse of telephone surveillance. Berger, specifically, limited police wiretapping when it struck down the New York statute for being overly broad.

== See also ==
- List of United States Supreme Court cases, volume 388
