= List of United States Supreme Court cases, volume 388 =

This is a list of all the United States Supreme Court cases from volume 388 of the United States Reports:

Case name	Citation	Date decided
Loving v. Virginia	388 U.S. 1	1967
Washington v. Texas	388 U.S. 14	1967
NLRB v. Great Dane Trailers, Inc.	388 U.S. 26	1967
Berger v. New York	388 U.S. 41	1967
Curtis Publishing Co. v. Butts	388 U.S. 130	1967
NLRB v. Allis-Chalmers Mfg. Co.	388 U.S. 175	1967
United States v. Wade	388 U.S. 218	1967
Gilbert v. California	388 U.S. 263	1967
Stovall v. Denno	388 U.S. 293	1967
Walker v. Birmingham	388 U.S. 307	1967
United States v. Sealy, Inc.	388 U.S. 350	1967
Exclusive territorial trademark licenses can still run afoul of antitrust laws if they are a part of unlawful price-fixing and policing.
United States v. Arnold, Schwinn & Co.	388 U.S. 365	1967
Prima Paint Corp. v. Flood & Conklin Mfg. Co.	388 U.S. 395	1967
Wisconsin v. Illinois (1967)	388 U.S. 426	1967
Jacobs v. New York	388 U.S. 431	1967
Tannenbaum v. New York	388 U.S. 439	1967
Keney v. New York	388 U.S. 440	1967
Friedman v. New York	388 U.S. 441	1967
Ratner v. California	388 U.S. 442	1967
Cobert v. New York	388 U.S. 443	1967
Sheperd v. New York	388 U.S. 444	1967
N.Y. Cent. R.R. Co. v. United States	388 U.S. 445	1967
Avansino v. New York	388 U.S. 446	1967
Aday v. United States	388 U.S. 447	1967
Corinth Publ'ns, Inc. v. Wesberry	388 U.S. 448	1967
Books, Inc. v. United States	388 U.S. 449	1967
Rosenbloom v. Virginia	388 U.S. 450	1967
Burkard v. New York	388 U.S. 451	1967
A Quantity of Copies of Books v. Kansas	388 U.S. 452	1967
Whitehouse Trucking, Inc. v. United States	388 U.S. 453	1967
Mazes v. Ohio	388 U.S. 453	1967
Schackman v. California	388 U.S. 454	1967
Order of Ry. Conductors v. United States	388 U.S. 455	1967
Landau v. Fording	388 U.S. 456	1967
Bell Tel. Lab's, Inc. v. Bureau of Revenue	388 U.S. 457	1967
Lupton Mfg. Co. v. United States	388 U.S. 457	1967
Canton Poultry, Inc. v. Conner	388 U.S. 458	1967
Parks v. Simpson Timber Co.	388 U.S. 459	1967
Savio v. California	388 U.S. 460	1967
Pierrel v. Ct. App. D.C. Cir.	388 U.S. 460	1967
Sanchez v. Cox	388 U.S. 461	1967
Balles v. New Jersey	388 U.S. 461	1967
Stellas v. Esperdy	388 U.S. 462	1967
Sandoval v. Utah	388 U.S. 463	1967
Hadley v. Massachusetts	388 U.S. 464	1967
Hemphill v. Illinois	388 U.S. 465	1967
Fox v. Oregon	388 U.S. 466	1967
