= Witness immunity =

Condition that may be offered to legal witnesses

Witness immunity from prosecution occurs when a prosecutor agrees not to prosecute a witness in exchange for testimony or production of other evidence.

In the United States, the prosecution may grant immunity in one of two forms. Transactional immunity, colloquially known as "blanket" or "total" immunity, completely protects the witness from future prosecution for crimes related to his or her testimony. Use and derivative use immunity prevents the prosecution only from using the witness's own testimony or any evidence derived from the testimony against the witness. However, if the prosecutor acquires evidence substantiating the crime independently of the witness's testimony, the witness may then be prosecuted.

Prosecutors at the state level may offer a witness either transactional or use and derivative use immunity, but at the federal level, use and derivative use immunity is much more common.

In the United States, Congress can also grant criminal immunity (at the Federal level) to witnesses in exchange for testifying.

== Grand jury testimony in the United States ==
Witnesses compelled by subpoena to appear before a grand jury are entitled to receive immunity in exchange for their testimony. The grant of immunity impairs the witness's right to invoke the Fifth Amendment protection against self-incrimination as a legal basis for refusing to testify.

Per 18 U.S.C. § 6002, a witness who has been granted immunity but refuses to offer testimony to a federal grand jury may be held in contempt. In addition, grand jury witnesses may be prosecuted for perjury or making false statements in their testimony.

In Kastigar v. United States, 406 U.S. 441 (1972), the US Supreme Court confronted the issue of the type of immunity, use or transactional, constitutionally required to compel testimony. The Court ruled that the grant of use and derivative use immunity is sufficient.

Despite Kastigar, the type of immunity required to compel testimony depends on the law of the applicable jurisdiction. Many states, such as New York, exceed the requirements of the US Constitution by requiring transactional immunity to be accorded to compelled witnesses.

In states in which defendants have a right to testify on their own behalf at a grand jury proceeding, waiver of immunity is a condition of that right.

== See also ==
- Immunity from prosecution (international law)
- Actual statute for federal and congressional use in the US
- Federal crime
- Immigration and Customs Enforcement (ICE)
- Informant
- Parliamentary immunity
- Plea bargain
- Proffer agreement
- Telephone tapping
- Turn state's evidence
- Undercover
- United States Federal Witness Protection Program
- Witness intimidation
