= Curtis Publishing Co. v. Butts =

- Supreme Court of the United States

Argued February 23, 1967 Decided June 12, 1967
- Full case name: Curtis Publishing Company v. Wally Butts
- Citations: 388 U.S. 130 (more) 94 S. Ct. 2997; 41 L. Ed. 2d 789; 1974 U.S. LEXIS 88; 1 Media L. Rep. 1633

Case history
- Prior: Cert. to the United States Court of Appeals for the Fifth Circuit
- Subsequent: No. 37, 351 F.2d 702, affirmed; No. 150, 393 S.W.2d 671, reversed and remanded

Holding
- Libel damages may be recoverable against a news organization if the injured party is not a public official, but a claimant must demonstrate a reckless lack of professional standards, on the part of the organization, in examining allegations for reasonable credibility.

Court membership
- Chief Justice Earl Warren Associate Justices Hugo Black · William O. Douglas; Tom C. Clark · John M. Harlan II; William J. Brennan Jr. · Potter Stewart; Byron White · Abe Fortas

Case opinions
- Plurality: Harlan, joined by Clark, Stewart, Fortas
- Concurrence: Warren
- Concur/dissent: Black, joined by Douglas
- Concur/dissent: Brennan, joined by White

Laws applied
- U.S. Const. amend. I

Curtis Publishing Co. v. Butts, 388 U.S. 130 (1967), is a landmark decision of the US Supreme Court establishing the standard of First Amendment protection against defamation claims brought by private individuals.

== Background ==
The case involved a libel lawsuit filed by the former Georgia Bulldogs football coach Wally Butts against The Saturday Evening Post. The lawsuit arose from an article in the magazine, which alleged that Butts, still Georgia's athletic director following his resignation as coach after the 1960 season, and the Alabama head coach Bear Bryant had conspired to fix games, specifically the 1962 season opener between the Bulldogs and Crimson Tide, which Alabama won 35-0. The Butts suit was consolidated with another case, Associated Press v. Walker, and both cases were decided in one opinion.

In finding for Butts but against Walker, the Supreme Court gave some indications of when a "public figure" could sue for libel.

== Decision ==
In a plurality opinion, written by Justice John Marshall Harlan II, the Supreme Court held that news organizations were protected from liability when they print allegations about public officials. However, New York Times Co. v. Sullivan (1964), the Supreme Court decided that news organizations are still liable to public figures if the published information is created with actual malice.

The Court ultimately ruled in favor of Butts, and The Saturday Evening Post was ordered to pay $3.06 million to Butts in damages, which was later reduced on appeal to $460,000.

The settlement was seen as a contributing factor in the demise of The Saturday Evening Post and its parent corporation, the Curtis Publishing Company, two years later. Butts and Bryant had sued for $10 million each. Bryant settled for $360,000.

== See also ==
- List of United States Supreme Court cases, volume 388
