= Kastigar v. United States =

- Supreme Court of the United States

Argued January 11, 1972 Decided May 22, 1972
- Full case name: Charles Joseph Kastigar and Michael Gorean Stewart v. United States
- Citations: 406 U.S. 441 (more) 92 S. Ct. 1653; 32 L. Ed. 2d 212; 1972 U.S. LEXIS 57

Holding
- The government may compel testimony from an unwilling witness who invokes the Fifth Amendment privilege against compulsory self-incrimination by conferring immunity from use of the compelled testimony and evidence derived therefrom in subsequent criminal proceedings.

Court membership
- Chief Justice Warren E. Burger Associate Justices William O. Douglas · William J. Brennan Jr. Potter Stewart · Byron White; Thurgood Marshall · Harry Blackmun; Lewis F. Powell Jr. · William Rehnquist

Case opinions
- Majority: Powell, joined by Burger, Stewart, White, Blackmun
- Dissent: Douglas
- Dissent: Marshall
- Rehnquist, Brennan took no part in the consideration or decision of the case.

Laws applied
- U.S. Const. amend. V

Kastigar v. United States, 406 U.S. 441 (1972), was a United States Supreme Court decision that ruled on the issue of whether the government's grant of immunity from prosecution can compel a witness to testify over an assertion of the Fifth Amendment privilege against self-incrimination. In a 5-2 decision (Justices Brennan and Rehnquist took no part in the consideration of the case), the Court held that the government can overcome a claim of Fifth Amendment privilege by granting a witness "use and derivative use" immunity in exchange for his testimony.

== Background ==
Petitioners were subpoenaed to appear before a federal grand jury in the United States District Court for the Central District of California on February 4, 1971. The Government believed that petitioners were likely to assert their Fifth Amendment privilege. Prior to the scheduled appearances, the government applied to the District Court for an order directing petitioners to answer questions and produce evidence before the grand jury under a grant of immunity conferred pursuant to 18 U.S.C. § 6003(a). Petitioners opposed issuance of the order, contending primarily that the scope of the immunity provided by the statute was not coextensive with the scope of the privilege against self-incrimination and so was not sufficient to supplant the privilege and compel their testimony. The District Court rejected their brief and ordered petitioners to appear before the grand jury and answer its questions, under the grant of immunity.

Petitioners appeared but refused to answer questions, asserting their privilege against compulsory self-incrimination. They were brought before the District Court, and all persisted in refusing to answer the grand jury's questions, notwithstanding the grant of immunity. The court found both in contempt and committed them to the custody of the Attorney General until either they answered the grand jury's questions or the term of the grand jury expired. The United States Court of Appeals for the Ninth Circuit affirmed. The Supreme Court granted certiorari to resolve the question of whether testimony may be compelled by granting immunity from the use of compelled testimony and evidence derived therefrom ("use and derivative use" immunity) or if it is necessary to grant immunity from prosecution for offenses to which compelled testimony relates ("transactional" immunity).

== Decision ==
The United States can compel testimony from an unwilling witness who invokes the Fifth Amendment privilege against compulsory self-incrimination by conferring immunity, as provided by 18 U.S.C. § 6002, from use of the compelled testimony and evidence derived therefrom in subsequent criminal proceedings, as such immunity from use and derivative use is coextensive with the scope of the privilege and sufficient to compel testimony over a claim of the privilege.

Transactional immunity would afford broader protection than the Fifth Amendment privilege and is not constitutionally required. In a subsequent criminal prosecution, the prosecution has the burden of proving affirmatively that evidence proposed to be used is derived from a legitimate source, wholly independent of the compelled testimony.
