= Handwriting exemplar =

Handwritten piece that can be used as an example in forensic examinations

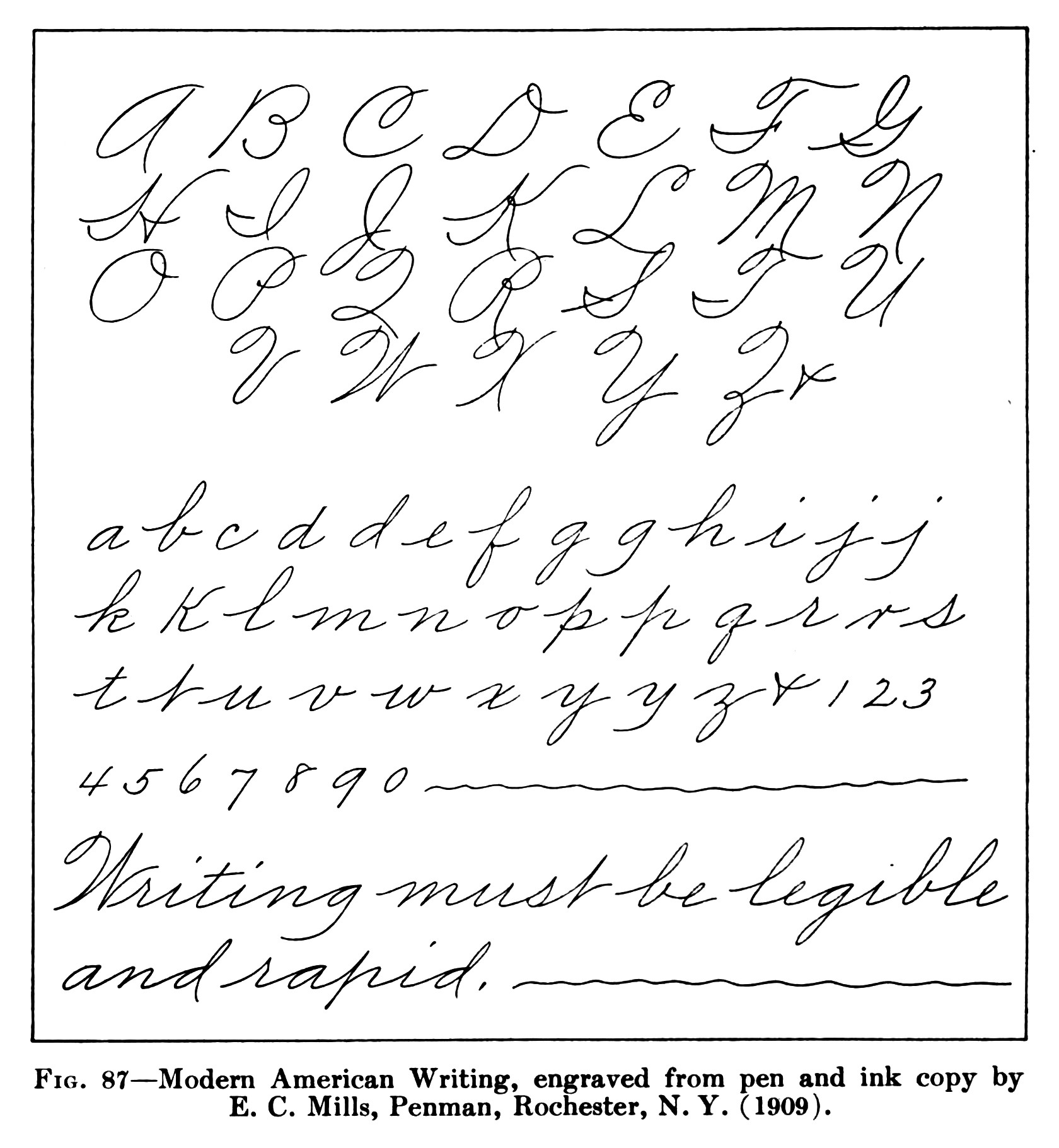

A handwriting exemplar is a piece of writing that can be examined forensically, as in a handwriting comparison. The use of an exemplar is especially important to questioned document examination.

== Use ==
Handwriting exemplars are used by a document examiner to determine the writing habits of an individual. Ideally, the exemplars will provide an adequate picture of the writer's habits such that a meaningful comparison can be conducted with the questioned material.

There are two types of handwriting exemplars that may be used; request writings and collected writings. Request writings are obtained from an individual specifically for the purposes of conducting a handwriting comparison whereas collected writings are samples the individual produced for some other, unrelated reason generally in the course of their day-to-day activities.

The two types of exemplars are complementary to one another. Request writings can be controlled to some degree by whoever obtains them. That is, it is possible to exercise some control over the writing to ensure that it is written in a comparable manner using a similar writing instrument, similar paper, etc. Most important, the text to be written is dictated to the writer so that it can either match the questioned text exactly or be modified to ensure comparability without exactly matching the text if, for example, the text itself should remain unknown. The primary concerns with request writing is that the writer might attempt to intentionally alter (disguise) their writing habits or the sample might not display the full range of the writer's natural variation. Collected writings are less likely to be affected by intentional alteration (disguise) and, if sufficient quantities can be obtained, should cover the writer's range of natural variation. As a result, the limitations of either type can be overcome by the other.

== Example Paragraphs ==
The following are a few examples of pre-determined text passages that have been used to obtain request exemplars. The text may be used exactly as shown here or modified to incorporate specific words or letter combinations that match the text of the questioned document.

The London Letter
Our London business is good, but Vienna and Berlin are quiet. Mr. D. Lloyd has gone to Switzerland and I hope for good news. He will be there for a week at 1496 Zermott Street and then goes to Turin and Rome and will join Colonel Parry and arrive at Athens, Greece, November 27 or December 2. Letters there should be addressed King James Blvd. 3580. We expect Charles E. Fuller Tuesday. Dr. L. McQuaid and Robert Unger, Esq., left on the 'Y. X.' Express tonight.

The Egyptian Letter
Dear Sam:
From Egypt we went to Italy, and then took a trip to Germany, Holland and England. We enjoyed it all but Rome and London most. In Berlin we met Mr. John O. Young of Messrs. Tackico & Co., on his way to Vienna. His address there is 147 upper Zeiss Street, care of Dr. Quincy W. Long. Friday the 18th, we join C. N. Dazet, Esquire and Mrs. Dazet, and leave at 6:30 A.M. for Paris on the 'Q. X.' Express and early on the morning on the 25th of June start for home on the S. S. King.
Very sincerely yours,
Signature of writer

The Class of "16" Letter
Dear Zach,
Well, the old class of "16" is through at last. You ask where the boys are to be. Val Brown goes on the 24th to Harvard for law. Don't forget to address him as "Esquire." Ted @!$#@$ takes a position with the N. Y. W. H. & H. R. R., 892 Ladd Ave., Fall River, Massachusetts, and Jack McQuade with the D. L. & W. at Jersey City, N. J. 400 E. 6th Street. William Fellows just left for a department position in Washington; his address is 735 South G. St. At last account, Dr. Max King was to go to John Hopkins for a Ph.D. degree. Think of that! Elliott goes to Xenia, Ohio, to be a Y. M. C. A. secretary. I stay here for the present. What do you do next? How about Idaho?
Yours truly, and Goodbye,
Signature of writer

National Park Tour Letter
A tour through our national parks would be enjoyable to you, I know. We left Los Angeles at 7:45 A.M., September 20, via Valley Boulevard, and motored to the Grand Canyon in Arizona. From there we drove to Zion National Park in Utah; next a jump to Yellowstone. Then we drove to the coast, into California, and through the Redwood Forest to San Francisco, the commercial Hub, arriving at 9:30 P.M., October 21. Here Mr. and Mrs. John X. Dix of 685 East Queen St., Topeka, Kansas joined us. I found the roads good, some quite equal to the best.

== See also ==
- Questioned document examination
