= Gilbert v. California =

- Supreme Court of the United States

Argued February 15–16, 1967 Decided June 12, 1967
- Full case name: Gilbert v. California
- Citations: 388 U.S. 263 (more) 87 S. Ct. 1951; 18 L. Ed. 2d 1178; 1967 U.S. LEXIS 1086

Case history
- Prior: People v. Gilbert, 63 Cal. 2d 690, 408 P.2d 365 (1965); cert. granted, 384 U.S. 985 (1966).

Holding
- A mere handwriting exemplar, in contrast with the content of what is written, is an identifying physical characteristic outside the Fifth Amendment protection against self-incrimination.

Court membership
- Chief Justice Earl Warren Associate Justices Hugo Black · William O. Douglas; Tom C. Clark · John M. Harlan II; William J. Brennan Jr. · Potter Stewart; Byron White · Abe Fortas

Case opinions
- Majority: Brennan, joined by Clark (in full); Warren, Douglas (Parts II and IV); Harlan, Stewart, White (all but Part IV); Fortas (all but Part I)
- Concur/dissent: Warren
- Concur/dissent: Black
- Concur/dissent: Douglas
- Concur/dissent: White, joined by Harlan, Stewart
- Concur/dissent: Fortas, joined by Warren

Gilbert v. California, 388 U.S. 263 (1967), was an important decision of the Supreme Court of the United States, which was argued February 15–16, 1967, and decided June 12, 1967.

The case involved Fourth Amendment and Fifth Amendment rights, the taking of handwriting exemplars, in-court identifications and warrantless searches.

== History ==
Petitioner was convicted of armed robbery and the murder of a police officer. There were separate guilt and penalty stages of the trial before the same jury, which rendered a guilty verdict and imposed the death penalty. Petitioner alleges constitutional errors in the admission of testimony of some of the witnesses that they had also identified him at a lineup, which occurred 16 days after his indictment and after appointment of counsel, who was not notified, and in in-court identifications of other witnesses present at that lineup; in the admission of handwriting exemplars taken from him after arrest; and in the admission of a co-defendant's out-of-court statements mentioning petitioner's part in the crimes, which statements were held to have been improperly admitted against the co-defendant on the latter's appeal. Additionally, he alleges violation of his Fourth Amendment rights by police seizure of photographs of him from his locked apartment after a warrantless entry, and the admission of testimony identifying him from these photographs.

== Ruling ==
1. The taking of handwriting exemplars did not violate petitioner's constitutional rights. pp. 265–267.

(a) The Fifth Amendment privilege against self-incrimination reaches compulsory communications, but a mere handwriting exemplar, in contrast with the content of what is written, is an identifying physical characteristic outside its protection.

(b) The taking of the exemplars was not a "critical" stage of the criminal proceedings entitling petitioner to the assistance of counsel; there is minimal risk that the absence of counsel might derogate from his right to a fair trial.

2. Petitioner's request for reconsideration of Delli Paoli v. United States, (where the Court held that appropriate instructions to the jury would suffice to prevent prejudice to a defendant from references to him in a co-defendant's statement) in connection with his co-defendant's statements, need not be considered in view of the California Supreme Court's holding rejecting the Delli Paoli rationale but finding that any error to petitioner by the admission of the statements was harmless.

3. A closer examination of the record than was possible when certiorari was granted reveals that the facts with respect to the search and seizure claim are not sufficiently clear to permit resolution of that question, and certiorari on this issue is vacated as improvidently granted.

4. The admission of the in-court identifications of petitioner without first determining that they were not tainted by the illegal lineup procedure but were of independent origin was constitutional error.

(a) Since the record does not permit an informed judgment whether the in-court identifications at the two stages of the trial had an independent source, petitioner is entitled only to a vacation of his conviction, pending proceedings in California courts allowing the State to establish that the in-court identifications had an independent source or that their introduction in evidence was harmless error.

(b) With respect to testimony of witnesses that they identified petitioner at the lineup, which is a direct result of an illegal procedure, the State is not entitled to show that such testimony had an independent source but the California courts must, unless "able to declare a belief that it was harmless beyond a reasonable doubt", grant petitioner a new trial if such testimony was at the guilt stage, or grant appropriate relief if it was at the penalty stage.
