= Constitution of Louisiana =

American state constitution

The Louisiana Constitution is legally named the Constitution of the State of Louisiana and commonly called the Louisiana Constitution of 1974, and the Constitution of 1974. The constitution is the cornerstone of the law of Louisiana ensuring the rights of individuals, describing the distribution and power of state officials and local government, establishes the state and city civil service systems, creates and defines the operation of a state lottery, and the manner of revising the constitution.

Louisiana's constitution was adopted (adopted in Convention) during the Constitutional Convention in 1974, ratified by the voters of the state on April 20, 1974, and became effective on January 1, 1975.

== History ==
The beginning of statehood for Louisiana began with the Louisiana Purchase in 1803. In 1804, the land the United States purchased from France was divided in two territories: 1) the Louisiana Territory (upper territory) and 2) the area below the 33rd parallel (current Louisiana-Arkansas state line), the Orleans Territory each as an organized incorporated territory of the United States. The Territory of Orleans formed the bulk of what today is the State of Louisiana. From the beginning there were border disputes. In 1795, the Treaty of Friendship, Limits, and Navigation Between Spain and the United States, known as Pinckney's Treaty, had set the stage for long nonviolent negotiations. An area between the Mississippi River and Perdido River (excluding New Orleans) was claimed by Spain as part of the West Florida Controversy. Also at issue was the area that became known as the neutral ground on the western border, meaning the territory had undefined borders. These disputes led to an end to diplomatic relations in 1805. Plantation owners proclaimed independence from Spain, establishing the short lived nation of the Republic of West Florida on Sept. 23, 1810, but President James Madison ordered U.S. forces into the area and incorporated it into the Orleans territory.

Senator William Giles of Virginia had already submitted a petition for statehood, in March 1810, based on the ordinance of 1787. The senate passed the petition on April 27, 1810, by a vote of 15 to 8, and ordered the territory to assemble a convention to draft a constitutional amendment. Because the president incorporated the area of West Florida into the Orleans Territory, Representative Julien Poydras (Orleans Territory) on December 17, 1810, petitioned for statehood based on Article III of the Louisiana Purchase. On Dec. 27, U.S. Representative Nathaniel Macon submitted a petition based on the inclusion of the territory of West Florida.

Confrontations were heated in the house that ranged from; the West Florida territory belonged to the Mississippi Territory (U.S. Representative William Bibb of Georgia), that the entire idea of expansion was unconstitutional without the vote of the people (U.S. Representative Richard Johnson of Kentucky), the undetermined borders (U.S. Representative Timothy Pitkin of Connecticut), and U.S. Representative Josiah Quincy's (Massachusetts) strong opposition;

"I address you, Mr. Speaker, with an anxiety and distress of mind with me wholly unprecedented. To me it appears that this measure would justify a revolution in this country. I am compelled to declare it as my deliberate opinion that, if this bill passes, the bonds of this Union are virtually dissolved.", and "The constitution is a political compact from which the original parties would be released if the assumed principle of this bill became law."

As a reaction to these comments House of Representative territorial delegate George Poindexter of Mississippi accused Quincy of treason. This resulted in a vote that Quincy won by a narrow margin of 56-53. With vindication Quincy continued;

Louisiana statehood would produce states that were free "from their moral obligation, and that, as it will be the right of all, so it will be the duty of some, to prepare, definitely, for a separation: amicably if they can, violently if they must!

After much heated debate, the bill being passed back and forth between the House and Senate over seven times, an agreement was reached, a resolution signed, and a joint conference committee passed an identical bill April 6, 1812. The ninth anniversary of the Louisiana Purchase of April 30, 1812, was chosen to be the date of admittance. The name of the first new state west of the Mississippi was to be called "Louisiana". The issue of West Florida was solved with statehood but the western border dispute remained unresolved until the Adams–Onís Treaty of 1819.

== Constitutions ==
=== Louisiana Constitution of 1812 ===
The first constitution was made after the Constitution of Kentucky with three stark differences. A Bill of Rights was not included, the system of law was (and still is) based on Civil law instead of English Common law, and the use of parishes instead of counties. The first constitution was drafted on January 22, 1812, and Louisiana became a U.S. State on April 30, 1812.

==== Antebellum period ====
In Louisiana, the period of time from 1812 until the start of the American Civil War is considered to be the antebellum period, although some use 1789 as the beginning. The period gave renewed fever to abolitionists and in 1814 the founding of the Manumission Society of Tennessee furthered anti-slavery sentiment.

According to the Constitution of 1812, originally called the Constitution or Form of Government of the State of Louisiana, that while the candidates for governor would be voted upon, the constitution provided that the legislature chose from the two who received the most votes.

=== Louisiana Constitution of 1845 ===
An act entitled, "An act to provide for the calling of a Convention for the purpose of re-adopting, amending or changing the Constitution of the State", was approved March 18, 1845, and the senatorial and representative delegates met August 5, 1844 to update or replace what had been considered to be an outdated constitution of 1812.

The Constitutional Convention of 1845 included senatorial delegates from the "counties" of Acadia, Lafourche, Attakapas, Opelousas, Rapides, Ouachita, Pointe Coupee, and Iberville, as well as representative delegates from parishes.

Some notable articles in the constitution:

- Only free white male citizens allowed to vote and persons eligible to vote under the constitution of 1812 retained (Title II: article 10)
- Eligibility for representative must be a free white male (Title III article 6)
- Members of active military ineligible to vote in any election (Title II; article 12)
- No active clergy, teacher of any religious persuasion are eligible as members of the general assembly (Title II; article 29)
- Four year successive term limits on the Governor (Title III; article 41); Minister ineligible as member of Congress (Title III; article 42)
- Felons under sentence where "death or hard labor may be inflicted" could appeal to the state Supreme Court (Title IV article 63)
- Created the office of Superintendent of Public Education (Title VII; article 133)
- Establishment of public schools (Title VII; article 134)
- Establishment of the University of Louisiana, which included the Medical College of Louisiana, which had been founded in 1834; in 1884, it became Tulane University, the only state public institution in America to be converted to a private one (Title VII; article 137 and 138).

=== Louisiana Constitution of 1852 ===
The Constitution of 1852 included an increase in the number of Louisiana Supreme Court justices to five, restricted the governor's powers, and created a public works. The fourth district included Imperial Calcasieu Parish, before the separation of Cameron, Beauregard, Jefferson Davis and Allen Parishes.

=== Louisiana Constitution of 1861 ===
The convention of 1861, convened to address concerns arising from the current political conflict, modified the constitution of 1852 to reflect Louisiana's secession (January 26, 1861) from the union. Ordinances included secession from the Union and the adoption of the constitution of the Confederate States of America,

=== Louisiana Constitution of 1864 ===
The Louisiana Constitution of 1864 abolished slavery throughout the state, but was effective only in the thirteen Louisiana parishes under Union control during the war. Voting rights to black men who fought for the Union, owned property, or were literate, were allowed to be authorized (but not given) by the state legislature. Other persons of color were excluded. A free public school system was allowed for all children aged six to eighteen, but the legislature established schools for whites only.

The failed Wade–Davis Bill included the Ironclad oath that was implemented by the Radical Republicans and used until repealed by President Arthur in May, 1884. The oath excluded ex-Confederate soldiers, anyone holding office in a state that seceded from the Union, or supporters of the Confederacy. This created further tension between persons of color and ex-Confederate soldiers. The lack of voting rights, Black codes, and a recall on the Constitutional Convention ultimately resulted in the New Orleans Riot.

=== Louisiana Constitution of 1868 ===
In 1867, Louisiana and Texas were placed in the Fifth Military District under General Philip Sheridan. A Third Reconstruction Act (1867) allowed district commanders authority to remove state officials from office. "Carpetbaggers" were appointed to many offices to assure loyalty to the Union.

A requirement for state Congressional representation, added by Congress as part of the Reconstruction Acts, was ratifying the Fourteenth Amendment to the United States Constitution. The constitution, adopted in conference March 7, 1868, was the first one in Louisiana to provide a formal bill of rights. It eradicated the Black Codes of 1865, removed property qualifications for holding office, and former Confederates were still disfranchised. Black men secured full citizenship with equal civil and political rights, state funded public education that prohibited segregated schools (Title VII; article 135) funded by one-half of the income from a poll tax (article 141), and equal treatment on public transportation. Title VI; article 75 provided a Supreme Court that consisted of a Chief Justice and four Associate Justices appointed by the Governor, with the advice and consent of the state Senate, for eight year terms. The Fourteenth Amendment to the United States Constitution was adopted on July 9, 1868, and the Louisiana was readmitted to the Union.

Considered the best constitution in Louisiana history, it did not solve racial discrimination. For the next eight years, political fighting and corruption continued in Louisiana. The Reconstruction era finally came to a close in Louisiana and the rest of the South with the trading of votes at the national level that led to the election of Rutherford B. Hayes as President. Federal troops were withdrawn on April 29, 1877, and mostly white, conservative Democrats regained control of Louisiana.

=== Louisiana Constitution of 1879 ===
The Constitution of 1879 was adopted in conference July 23, and was ratified December 8, 1879 returning Louisiana to home rule. The new constitution placed more limits on the voting rights of freedmen. The state capital was moved from New Orleans to Baton Rouge. The state Supreme Court retained five members, who were appointed by the governor for twelve-year terms, and for the first time were given supervisory power over inferior courts. A lottery was authorized (article 167) but gambling (article 172) was considered a vice to be suppressed.

From 1872 to 1877 there had been essentially a dual government, as Democrats rejected the election of Republicans. During this period election cycle violence continued to increase as white Democrats sought to suppress the black Republican vote. Louisiana was torn, not unlike during the Civil war, with battles between the Radical Republicans and the Southern Democrats. With the Democrats resumption of power in 1877, the Solid South coalition was formed. The period of time from 1868 to 1879 was marked with violence against freedmen, as seen in the First Battle of the Cabildo (March 5, 1873) and the Colfax massacre April 13, 1873), both events that arose from the disputed gubernatorial election of 1872. Charges related to the Colfax events reached the US Supreme Court. In United States v. Cruikshank (1876), it supported federal restrictions on the civil freedoms supposedly guaranteed by the Bill of Rights of the Constitution of the United States and the Louisiana Constitution. It denied African-American citizens the constitutional rights of the Fourteenth Amendment and the right to bear arms.

The Coushatta Massacre (1874), the Battle of Liberty Place (September 14, 1874), and the Second Battle of the Cabildo (January 1877), are instances of whites attacking blacks that involved the Redeemers and the White League, an insurgent paramilitary group.

The Freedmen's Bureau had reported a multitude of physical attacks on freedmen and their supporters in Louisiana from 1865 to 1868, when the Bureau was closed and no authority recorded this data. After the Bureau closed in 1872, atrocities were largely buried by local communities and seldom taken to court. Federal courts, as well as the Louisiana Supreme Court and the U.S. Supreme Court, did not generally hear charges at the state level. Following the end of Reconstruction, the rate of lynchings of blacks increased, reaching a peak at the end of the 19th century, when Louisiana and other southern states passed new constitutions and laws to effectively disenfranchise African Americans.

=== Louisiana Constitution of 1898 ===
The Louisiana Constitution of 1898, was adopted in Convention May 12, 1898. Article 197 provided restrictions, directed primarily at black voters. An annual poll tax of one dollar was levied (Article 198) on all males, ages twenty-one to sixty to be eligible to vote, with receipt of the two previous years being paid. The money to be used in the parish where the tax is levied and collected for education. For the first time women tax payers were allowed to vote (Article 199). An annual poll tax of one dollar was levied on every male between the ages of twenty-one and sixty to be used for public school maintenance (article 231). Parish road districts were created (Article 291) and taxes were authorized to include, an annual road maintenance poll tax of not more than one dollar for each able-bodied male (eighteen to fifty-five years old) authorized, with compulsory road service to be waved on those that paid the tax, and an annual road tax from twenty-five cents to one dollar for each vehicle, including bicycles, was levied. The state would support the old soldiers home (Article 302) known as Camp Nichols. Loyal, honorably discharged or paroled, indigent Confederate soldiers, referred to as inmates, were provided a pension of eight dollars a month. The home housed confederate soldiers into the 1940s.

==== Non-unanimous jury ====
The 1898 constitution provided for conviction in "cases in which the punishment is necessarily at hard labor" by a verdict of nine out of twelve jurors. This provision survived into the 1974 constitution, but with the change to require a verdict of ten out of twelve. Research by Louisiana’s newspaper of record, The Advocate, shows how this provision has been used to drive incarceration, especially of black people. The series, entitled “Tilting the Scales,” debuted Easter Sunday 2018, and would later win The Advocate its first Pulitzer Prize, as well as a George Polk Award. Praised by state lawmakers, the series had an impact on public opinion; Louisiana voters overwhelmingly voted to amend the Constitution of 1974 in November of 2018, requiring all future felony convictions to be unanimous. In the 2020 case Ramos v. Louisiana, the U.S. Supreme Court incorporated the Sixth Amendment right of a unanimous verdict against all the states.

==== White supremacy ====
The proceedings of the convention at which the 1898 constitution was developed and adopted contains the word "supremacy" at least eight times, including:

- Page 10, opening remarks by Ernest Kruttschnitt, president of the convention, final paragraph: "May this hall, where. thirty-two years ago, the negro first entered upon the unequal contest for supremacy, and which has been reddened with his blood, now witness the evolution of our organic law which will establish the relations between the races upon an everlasting foundation of right and justice. (Applause)."
- Page 374..5, concluding remarks by Thomas Semmes, Chairman of the Committee on the Judiciary: "... We met here to establish the supremacy of the white race, and the white race constitutes the Democratic party of this State."
- Page 375, Now then, what have we done? is the question. Our mission was, in the first place, to establish the supremacy of the white race in this State to the extent to which it could be legally and constitutionally done, and what has our ordinance on suffrage, the constitutional means by which we propose to maintain that ascendency, done? We have established throughout the State white manhood suffrage." "We, therefore, have in this State a large white population whose right to vote would have been stricken down but for the operation of section 5. And all of these men had aided the white people of the State to wrest from the hands of the Republican party, composed almost exclusively of negroes, the power which, backed by the Federal bayonets, they had exercised for many years."
- Page 381, concluding remarks by Ernest Kruttschnitt, president of the convention: "We have placed it within the power of the people of this State to have elections as fair and as pure as those in the State of Massachusetts herself; and I say to you that we can appeal to the conscience of the nation, both judicial and legislative, and I don't believe that they will take the responsibility of striking down the system which we have reared in order to protect the purity of the ballot box, and to perpetuate the supremacy of the Anglo-Saxon race in Louisiana."

=== Louisiana Constitution of 1913 ===
A constitutional convention was called to re-fund the state debt and enlarge the powers of the New Orleans Sewer and Water Board. Concerns over possible Supreme Court constitutionality decisions led to a longer constitution with all sixty-six amendments to the Constitution of 1898 being included. Supreme Court Justices to be elected, more funding for education was provided, and six amendments to the Confederate Pension Plan.

=== Louisiana Constitution of 1921 ===
The Louisiana Constitution of 1921, was adopted in convention June 18, 1921. A major concern was validity of some provisions of the Constitution of 1913. Article IV: section 7; Authority to set minimum wage, regulate hours and working conditions for women and girls, with exceptions for agriculture and domestic service. Article IV: section 16; No law abolishing forced "heirship". Article VII: section 4; The Supreme Court justices increased to seven. Section 5; Supreme Court may sit in divisions of three, and two judges from the Court of Appeals may be called in for a third division to reduce backlogs. Section 6; Justices to be elected for a period of fourteen years. The constitution, the longest in Louisiana history (as of 2020), lasted fifty-three years. It removed all references to the French language and mandated that "the general exercises in the public schools... be conducted in the English language".

== Articles of the Louisiana Constitution of 1974 ==
=== Preamble ===
We, the people of Louisiana, grateful to Almighty God for the civil, political, economic, and religious liberties we enjoy, and desiring to protect individual rights to life, liberty, and property; afford opportunity for the fullest development of the individual; assure equality of rights; promote the health, safety, education, and welfare of the people; maintain a representative and orderly government; ensure domestic tranquility; provide for the common defense; and secure the blessings of freedom and justice to ourselves and our posterity, do ordain and establish this constitution.

=== Article I. Declaration of Rights ===
Contains provisions similar to the Bill of Rights in the United States Constitution, plus additional provisions unique to the State, such as Article I.27, which protects the freedom of the people to engage in traditional pastimes of hunting, trapping, and fishing, subject only to laws and regulations designed to "protect, conserve, and replenish the natural resources" of the State

=== Article II. Distribution of Powers ===
Arranges the state government into the traditional three branches: legislative, executive, and judicial, and prohibits any branch from exercising the powers of any other branch.

=== Article III. Legislative Branch ===
Organizes the Louisiana Legislature into a bicameral one, consisting of the Louisiana House of Representatives (having no more than 105 members) and the Louisiana Senate (having no more than 39 members).

Sets qualifications for office, term limits (no more than three consecutive terms), and for filling vacancies.

This section also discusses when the Legislature shall meet in regular session and how "Extraordinary Sessions" (special sessions) can be convened (either by the Governor or by the leaders of both the House and Senate upon petition of the majority of the members of both houses). The regular session times and lengths, as well as what can be enacted, depend on the year:

- In even-numbered years, the Legislature meets at noon on the last Monday in March, for a period limited to 60 legislative days over 85 calendar days with the session required to end on or before 6PM on the 85th calendar day. The Legislature is prohibited from enacting legislation which would enact or increase a statewide tax, or in regards to tax exemptions, exclusions, deductions, or credits, during these sessions.
- In odd-numbered years, the Legislature meets at noon on the last Monday in April, for a period limited to 45 legislative days over 60 calendar days with the session required to end on or before 6PM on the 60th calendar day. The subject matter of any bills is limited to specified items involving taxes, fees, bonds, the budget, or appropriations, unless the bill is prefiled no later than 10 days before the session begins.

It also contains prohibitions against certain "local and special laws" (i.e., laws which make an act legal or illegal in one portion of the state, but not in another), requires appropriations bills to originate in the House, and sets rules for passage of bills and laws. Furthermore, it contains a provision for the "Legislative Auditor", who is responsible for auditing the fiscal records of the State, its agencies and political subdivisions.

=== Article IV. Executive Branch ===
Organizes the composition of the executive branch. Except for the offices of the Governor of Louisiana and Lieutenant Governor of Louisiana, the branch is limited to no more than 20 departments comprising all functions.

Sets forth the qualifications for each branch member, term limits (two terms for the Governor, and three terms for members of certain appointed boards), determination of inability to serve and how.

=== Article V. Judicial Branch of Government ===
Sets forth the organization of the Louisiana Supreme Court and the various lower courts, as well as the provisions for qualifications of jurors and, under Section V.29, parish coroners. There are currently no known public commissions from the United Kingdom to assist the State of Louisiana with the foundation of a civil - common "hybrid" Court of cassassion, although attempts have been made following the cohesion difficulties identified (justice system of the state) following on from the Katrina disaster.

=== Article VI. Local Government ===
Unusual among state Constitutions, several Articles of the Louisiana Constitution contain Parts which are further organized into sections.

==== Part I. General Provisions ====
Defines the composition of parishes (as counties are called in Louisiana) and municipalities, provisions for home rule charters, and other allowances and limitations.

==== Part II. Finance ====
Places limitations on taxation and issuance of bonds for parishes, municipalities, and local school boards

==== Part III. Levee Districts ====
Allows for the creation of special levee districts in coastal parishes.

==== Part IV. Port Commissions and Districts ====
Allows the Legislature to create new port commissions and districts, and grandfathers existing ones at the time of the 1974 Constitution adoption.

==== Part V. Definitions ====
Defines certain terms for purposes of this Article only.

=== Article VII. Revenue and Finance ===
==== Part I. General Provisions ====
Provides for the authority to assess and collect various taxes, subject to limitations, as well as for various dedicated funds.

==== Part II. Property Taxation ====
Provides for taxation of real and personal property, including sale of property for nonpayment (Louisiana is a tax deed sale state with a 3-year right of redemption in most cases) and qualifications for the parish tax assessor.

==== Part III. Revenue Sharing ====
Provides for the creation of the Revenue Sharing Fund.

==== Part IV. Transportation ====
Provides for the creation of the Transportation Trust Fund.

=== Article VIII. Education ===
Provides that the Legislature shall provide for the education of the people of Louisiana. Provides for the State Superintendent, the State Board of Elementary and Secondary Education, the Louisiana Board of Regents and the Boards of Supervisors of the LSU System, the University of Louisiana System, and the community and technical colleges, and the parish school boards. It also provides for school funding and for public hospitals.

=== Article IX. Natural Resources ===
Includes various provisions involving mineral rights, regulation of natural gas and pipelines, the Wildlife and Fisheries and Forestry commissions, and certain dedicated funds.

=== Article X. Public Officials and Employees ===
==== Part I. State and City Civil Service ====
Provides for the creation of the State and various city civil service commissions (excluding the State Police Service, covered under Part IV, and paid firefighters and police in certain instances (mainly covered under Part II).

==== Part II. Fire and Police Civil Service ====
Provides for the creation of classified fire and police civil service systems in certain larger municipalities and in parishes.

==== Part III. Other Provisions ====
Miscellaneous provisions dealing with removal of public officials and teachers' retirement systems, among others.

==== Part IV. State Police Service ====
Provides for the creation of the classified State Police civil service system.

=== Article XI. Elections ===
Provides that the secret ballot shall be used in all elections, prohibits the use of public funds to urge passage for or against any candidate or proposition, and provides for the Registrar of voters for each parish.

=== Article XII. General Provisions ===
Contains miscellaneous provisions such as the state capital (Baton Rouge), creation of a state lottery, and prohibition of same-sex unions. This was ruled unconstitutional by the U.S. Supreme Court in 2015 with Obergefell v. Hodges. The U.S. Fifth Circuit Court of Appeals reversed its ruling in Robicheaux v. Caldwell and there have been unsuccessful attempts to call a limited constitutional convention in an attempt to remove the wording. There is no actual "limited constitutional amendment convention" in Louisiana. If approved the committee has no hamstrings on what can be attempted to be changed. As of now the law, as written, is considered a trigger law. There is presently no mention of the changing of same-sex union wording in the upcoming March 29, 2025, statewide constitutional referendum election.

=== Article XIV. Transitional Provisions ===
Contains provisions to transition between the prior 1921 Constitution and the current 1974 version.
