= Apodaca v. Oregon =

- Supreme Court of the United States

Argued March 1, 1971 Reargued January 10, 1972 Decided May 22, 1972
- Full case name: Robert Apodaca et al. v. State of Oregon
- Citations: 406 U.S. 404 (more) 92 S. Ct. 1628; 32 L. Ed. 2d 184
- Argument: Oral argument
- Reargument: Reargument
- Opinion announcement: Opinion announcement

Case history
- Prior: State v. Plumes, 1 Or. App. 483; 462 P.2d 691 (1969); cert. granted, 400 U.S. 901 (1970).

Holding
- There is no constitutional right to a unanimous jury verdict in non-federal criminal cases. Thus Oregon's law did not violate due process.

Court membership
- Chief Justice Warren E. Burger Associate Justices William O. Douglas · William J. Brennan Jr. Potter Stewart · Byron White; Thurgood Marshall · Harry Blackmun; Lewis F. Powell Jr. · William Rehnquist

Case opinions
- Plurality: White, joined by Burger, Blackmun, Rehnquist
- Concurrence: Blackmun
- Concurrence: Powell (in judgment)
- Dissent: Douglas, joined by Brennan, Marshall
- Dissent: Brennan, joined by Marshall
- Dissent: Stewart, joined by Brennan, Marshall
- Dissent: Marshall, joined by Brennan

Laws applied
- U.S. Const. amend. VI
- Overruled by
- Ramos v. Louisiana (2020)

Apodaca v. Oregon - 406 U.S. 404 (1972) - is a United States Supreme Court case in which the Court held that state juries may convict a defendant by a less-than-unanimous verdict in a felony criminal case. The four-justice plurality opinion of the court, written by Justice White, affirmed the judgment of the Oregon Court of Appeals and held that there was no constitutional right to a unanimous verdict. Although federal law requires federal juries to reach criminal verdicts unanimously, the Court held Oregon's practice did not violate the Sixth Amendment right to trial by jury and so allowed it to continue. In Johnson v. Louisiana, a case decided on the same day, the Court held that Louisiana's similar practice of allowing criminal convictions by a jury vote of 9–3 did not violate due process or equal protection under the Fourteenth Amendment.

Justice Powell, in his concurring opinion, argued that there was a constitutional right to a unanimous jury in the Sixth Amendment, but that the Fourteenth Amendment's Due Process Clause does not incorporate that right as applied to the states. This case is part of a line of cases interpreting if and how the Sixth Amendment is applied against the states through the Fourteenth Amendment for the purposes of incorporation doctrine, although the division of opinions prevented a clear-cut answer to that question in this case.

Apodaca v. Oregon was overruled by Ramos v. Louisiana (2020).

== Background on non-unanimous jury verdicts ==
Federal law requires that juries return a unanimous verdict—one that all members of the jury agree upon—in criminal trials. While most states follow the same requirement for felony convictions, at the time when Apodaca reached the U.S. Supreme Court, neither Oregon nor Louisiana required state court juries to return unanimous verdicts.

Oregon created its rule in 1934 by state constitutional amendment. Specifically, as long as at least 10 jurors on a 12-member jury agreed, the jury could render a verdict of guilty or not guilty. The Louisiana Legislature passed a similar "Majority Rule" law in 1880, allowing for jury verdicts of 9–3, which was later ratified at its 1898 constitutional convention.

In 2018, Louisiana voters passed a constitutional amendment that ended their practice of non-unanimous juries. When Apodaca was overruled by Ramos v. Louisiana in April 2020, Oregon was the only state that still allowed non-unanimous jury verdicts for felonies (although first-degree murder convictions require a unanimous jury verdict).

== Facts and procedural posture ==
Robert Apodaca, Henry Morgan Cooper Jr., and James Arnold Madden, were convicted of assault with a deadly weapon, burglary in a dwelling, and grand larceny, respectively, in separate trials in Oregon state court. All three juries returned non-unanimous verdicts: Apodaca and Madden's juries voted 11–1 to convict, and Cooper's jury voted 10–2. They appealed their convictions to the Court of Appeals of Oregon, arguing that they were entitled to have the jury instructed that jurors must unanimously agree to convict. The Court of Appeals of Oregon, sitting en banc, affirmed their convictions. In doing so, the court relied on a previous Oregon Supreme Court case, State v. Gann, 254 Or. 549 (1969), that had upheld the provision of the Oregon Constitution allowing the 10–2 jury practice as not a violation of the Fourteenth Amendment. The Oregon Supreme Court denied review, and the three sought review in the U.S. Supreme Court.

In Johnson v. Louisiana (a case decided by the Supreme Court on the same day as Apodaca), a criminal defendant in Louisiana raised the same issue: whether a less-than-unanimous jury verdict in state court criminal cases violates a defendant's constitutional rights. Frank Johnson was convicted of armed robbery by a Louisiana state court jury verdict of 9–3, which was permissible under Louisiana law. However, unlike in Apodaca, where petitioners argued that this practice violated their Sixth Amendment right to a jury trial (as incorporated by the Fourteenth Amendment), the petitioner in Johnson raised Fourteenth Amendment equal protection and due process claims. The Supreme Court of Louisiana affirmed his conviction, holding that a 9–3 jury verdict did not violate his equal protection or due process rights. Johnson petitioned the U.S. Supreme Court for review.

Both Apodaca and Johnson were argued before the U.S. Supreme Court on March 1, 1971, and reargued on January 10, 1972. Arguing the case for the state of Oregon were Jacob Tanzer and Lee Johnson; both would later serve on the Oregon Court of Appeals. The Court decided both cases on May 22, 1972, and upheld the Oregon and Louisiana non-unanimous jury convictions.

== U.S. Supreme Court decision and reasoning ==
First, the Supreme Court held that the constitutional right to trial by jury found in the Sixth Amendment (made applicable to the states by the Fourteenth Amendment) was not violated by a less-than-unanimous jury verdict in state criminal court.

The Court likened jury unanimity to the 12-person requirement for juries. In Williams v. Florida, decided just four years before Apodaca, the Court held that Florida's refusal to impanel more than six members for a jury trial did not violate the defendant's Sixth Amendment rights. Although the Court in Williams recognized a long common law tradition of having 12-member juries, it stated, "[w]e conclude, in short, as we began: the fact that the jury at common law was composed of precisely 12 is a historical accident." The Court in Apodaca drew parallels between the 12-member requirement and the unanimous requirement: both "arose during the Middle Ages and had become an accepted feature of the common-law jury by the 18th century." And yet neither a 12-member jury nor jury unanimity, the Court held, were constitutional requirements.

In its reasoning, the Court recognized, as it did in Duncan and Williams, that the purposes of a jury included to "safeguard against the corrupt or overzealous prosecutor and against the compliant, biased, or eccentric judge," and to inject into the trial "commonsense judgment of a group of laymen". But the Court found that these purposes could still be accomplished even if a jury returned a less-than-unanimous verdict. Moreover, the Court reasoned, requiring unanimity would simply produce more hung juries. The Court also rejected the argument that unanimity would protect the reasonable-doubt standard. If some jurors voted to acquit, the petitioners argued, they could not have been found guilty beyond a reasonable doubt. But the Court rejected the idea that this requirement is found in the Sixth Amendment, because the reasonable-doubt standard arose after the Constitution was written and is instead rooted in due process.

Second, the Court also held that jury unanimity is not mandated by the Fourteenth Amendment's requirement that racial minorities not be systemically excluded during voir dire, the process by which jurors are chosen for a trial. Petitioners had argued that allowing non-unanimous jury verdicts skirts the requirement to not exclude minorities because the majority could simply out-vote minority members of the jury by 10–2 or 11–1. In rejecting this argument, the Court first said that defendants do not have a right to have members of their community on their particular jury, but rather that minority members simply cannot be systematically excluded from juries. Next, the Court said that even if racial minorities found themselves in a jury minority, the rest of the jury would hear their voices and that there is "no proof for the notion that a majority will disregard its instructions and cast its votes for guilt or innocence based on prejudice rather than the evidence".

== Concurrences and dissents ==
The four-justice plurality decided that federal and state juries should operate in the same way—and that the constitution does not require jury unanimity in either court system. The four dissenting justices agreed that federal and state juries should abide by the same rules—but argued that the constitution does require jury unanimity. Justice Powell concurred with the plurality opinion, determining that the Sixth Amendment mandated jury unanimity in federal trials but not in state trials, because he found that the Fourteenth Amendment did not incorporate that right as applied to the states. Because the Court's decision garnered support from only four justices—a plurality, rather than a majority—Justice Powell's narrower concurrence controls, and is what must be followed by state courts.

Because Apodaca and Johnson presented the same question, the Court decided both cases on the same day and some of the justices' opinions apply to both cases. In Apodaca, Justice White wrote the plurality opinion of the court, which was joined by Chief Justice Burger, Justice Blackmun, and Justice Rehnquist. Justice Stewart dissented, and Justice Brennan and Justice Marshall joined that dissent. Similarly, in Johnson, Justice White wrote the opinion of the Court, and Justice Stewart filed a dissenting opinion, which Justice Brennan and Justice Marshall joined. There were five other written opinions that applied to both Apodaca and Johnson. Justice Blackmun and Justice Powell each wrote a concurring opinion; and Justices Douglas, Brennan, and Marshall each wrote a dissent (Justice Douglas's dissent was joined by Justice Brennan and Justice Marshall; Justices Brennan and Marshall joined each other's dissents).

== Controversial history ==
Recent scholarly debate has focused on the historical origins of Oregon and Louisiana's less-than-unanimous jury practices.

Oregon's constitutional amendment was put on the ballot a year after a lone holdout juror prevented a Jewish man from being found guilty of murdering a Protestant one. On Nov. 25, 1933, the day after the jury convicted on the lesser offense of manslaughter (resulting in a three-year sentence), The Morning Oregonian "railed against the juror in an editorial tinged with racist undertones and nativist fervor," in which the editors wrote that "the vast immigration into America from southern and eastern Europe, of people untrained in the jury system, have combined to make the jury of twelve increasingly unwieldy and unsatisfactory." Previous editorials around the same time "bemoaned 'mixed-blood' jurors and lamented the role that some immigrants played on juries, questioning their 'sense of responsibility' and 'views on crime and punishment.'" The Oregon constitutional amendment passed on May 18, 1934.

In the 1990s, an Oregon study found that too few minorities were called for jury duty, even fewer served on juries, and preemptory challenges were being used based on race. Furthermore, other studies show that non-unanimous juries make it more likely that minority members on a jury can be out-voted. The Supreme Court in Apodaca had considered this issue, but hypothesized that the majority would still carefully consider the objections of minority jurors before overruling them. The Court lent further support to the states' non-unanimous jury verdict systems by saying that they helped prevent hung juries with holdouts who refuse to convict–or acquit. Because this rule can go either way, it could benefit some defendants who will be acquitted of a crime instead of having to go through another trial.

Louisiana's legislature changed its Code of Practice to allow for non-unanimous jury verdicts in 1880, during the Jim Crow era. Louisiana's white land owners struggled to replace free slave labor, and the state began leasing convicts to plantation owners. During the 1898 Louisiana constitutional convention, the Louisiana legislature ratified the split verdict law, making it possible to convict defendants on a jury verdict of 9–3. This, in turn, created more convicts (especially freed blacks), and thus increased the numbers available for for-profit convict leasing.

Louisiana officially ended its non-unanimous jury verdict system by constitutional amendment in 2018.

Scholars and politicians had argued that Oregon should also end its practice.

On April 20, 2020, the Supreme Court overruled Apodaca v. Oregon in Ramos v. Louisiana.

== See also ==
- List of United States Supreme Court cases, volume 406
