= Ramos v. Louisiana =

- Supreme Court of the United States

Argued October 7, 2019 Decided April 20, 2020
- Full case name: Evangelisto Ramos, Petitioner v. Louisiana
- Docket no.: 18-5924
- Citations: 590 U.S. 83 (more) 140 S. Ct. 1390, 206 L.Ed.2d 583
- Argument: Oral argument
- Decision: Opinion

Case history
- Prior: Defendant convicted of second-degree murder based on 10-to-2 jury verdict, sentenced to life in prison without possibility of parole.; Affirmed, State v. Ramos, 231 So. 3d 44 (La. Ct. App. 2017); writs denied, 257 So. 3d 679, 253 So. 3d 1300 (La. 2018).; Cert. granted, 139 S. Ct. 1318 (2019).

Questions presented
- Whether the Fourteenth Amendment fully incorporates the Sixth Amendment guarantee of a unanimous verdict.

Holding
- The Sixth Amendment right to a jury trial—as incorporated against the States by way of the Fourteenth Amendment—requires a unanimous verdict to convict a defendant of a serious offense.

Court membership
- Chief Justice John Roberts Associate Justices Clarence Thomas · Ruth Bader Ginsburg; Stephen Breyer · Samuel Alito; Sonia Sotomayor · Elena Kagan; Neil Gorsuch · Brett Kavanaugh

Case opinions
- Majority: Gorsuch (Parts I, II–A, III, and IV–B–1), joined by Ginsburg, Breyer, Sotomayor, Kavanaugh
- Plurality: Gorsuch (Parts II–B, IV–B–2, and V), joined by Ginsburg, Breyer, Sotomayor
- Plurality: Gorsuch (Part IV–A), joined by Ginsburg, Breyer
- Concurrence: Sotomayor (all but Part IV–A)
- Concurrence: Kavanaugh (in part)
- Concurrence: Thomas (in judgment)
- Dissent: Alito, joined by Roberts; Kagan (all but Part III–D)

Laws applied
- U.S. Const. amends. VI, XIV
- This case overturned a previous ruling or rulings
- Apodaca v. Oregon (1972) (plurality opinion), Johnson v. Louisiana (1972) (Powell, J., concurring)

Ramos v. Louisiana, 590 U.S. 83 (2020), is a U.S. Supreme Court decision in which the Court ruled that the Sixth Amendment to the U.S. Constitution requires that guilty verdicts be unanimous in criminal trials. The decision also incorporated the Sixth Amendment requirement for unanimous jury criminal convictions against the states, and thereby overturned the Court's previous decision from the 1972 cases Apodaca v. Oregon and Johnson v. Louisiana. At the time of the decision, only Oregon and Louisiana allowed non-unanimous jury convictions, while all other states had incorporated the unanimous requirement.

== Background ==
The Sixth Amendment to the United States Constitution defines procedures for prosecution of criminal cases against individuals and assures a jury trial for a person charged on a criminal offense, but does not specify the process around that trial, leaving it for states to define within their own constitutions. In 1972 the Supreme Court held in Apodaca v. Oregon that the Sixth Amendment right to a unanimous verdict should not be incorporated to apply to state trials, and that same year Louisiana's law survived a separate due process challenge in Johnson v. Louisiana

Oregon became the only state to allow split-jury verdicts after Louisiana amended its state constitution in 2019. The present case's petitioner, Evangelisto Ramos, had been convicted of murder in Louisiana on a 10–2 vote in 2016, before the change to Louisiana's state constitution. Ramos appealed the conviction on the issue around the non-unanimous jury factor, arguing that the law, established in 1898, was a Jim Crow law that allowed for racial discrimination within juries. The Louisiana Court of Appeal, Fourth Circuit upheld his sentence in a November 2017 opinion.

Ramos petitioned to the U.S. Supreme Court on the question "Whether the Fourteenth Amendment fully incorporates the Sixth Amendment guarantee of a unanimous verdict". The Court accepted the case in March 2019. Oral argument for the case was held on October 7, 2019.

== Decision ==
In a 6–3 decision, the Court ruled that the unanimity of a jury vote for conviction mandated by the Sixth Amendment for serious crimes must also be an incorporated right against the states, overturning Apodaca v. Oregon.

=== Majority opinion ===
Justice Neil Gorsuch wrote the majority opinion, joined in parts by justices Ruth Bader Ginsburg, Sonia Sotomayor, Stephen Breyer, and Brett Kavanaugh, which holds that the guarantee is incorporated by the Due Process Clause of the Fourteenth Amendment. Justice Clarence Thomas joined in the judgment only.

The Court said the Louisiana and Oregon non-unanimous verdict laws had racist origins: "Courts in both Louisiana and Oregon have frankly acknowledged that race was a motivating factor in the adoption of their states' respective non-unanimity rules".

Then it analyzed the history of the Sixth Amendment right to "trial by an impartial jury", finding that "the common law, state practices in the founding era, [and] opinions and treatises written soon afterward" all required unanimous jury verdicts.

The decision splintered on how to apply stare decisis, with Justices Sotomayor and Kavanaugh writing separately on stare decisis. A minority of justices disputed the precedential value of Apodaca. Applying the doctrine of stare decisis, the court concluded that Apodaca should be overruled as it had been undermined by other Supreme Court decisions that have rejected "dual-track incorporation". While the Court did acknowledge some potential reliance interests, it was not enough to convince them that Apodaca should remain a precedent.

=== Concurring opinion ===
Justice Sotomayor wrote separately to say that stare decisis was weakest "in cases concerning criminal procedure that implicate fundamental constitutional protections." Justice Kavanaugh wrote separately about stare decisis. Justice Thomas concurred in the judgment, writing separately his view that rights should apply to states via the Privileges or Immunities Clause, and not the Due Process Clause of the 14th amendment.

=== Dissenting opinion ===
Justice Samuel Alito wrote the dissent joined by Chief Justice John Roberts and in part by Justice Elena Kagan. Alito wrote that the Court should uphold the principle of stare decisis since both Oregon and Louisiana have used the ruling from Apodaca v. Oregon for more than forty years. For Justice Alito, the state's reliance interests tipped the balance against "a potential tsunami of litigation". The dissent said the majority's dictum about racial motives is an "[attempt] to discredit an argument not by proving that it is unsound but by attacking the character or motives of the argument's proponents" because the decision, which requires jury unanimity in all state trials, applies even when state laws do not have a checkered history.

== Subsequent cases ==
The majority opinion in Ramos v. Louisiana considered whether prisoners may seek collateral review to challenge non-unanimous convictions, but declined to decide the issue. While all defendants who had not yet exhausted their appeals were expected to be granted new trials, the Supreme Court did not address the issue of whether or not defendants who had exhausted all appeals can be covered by Ramos.

Thedrick Edwards, a different Louisiana inmate convicted by a 10-to-2 decision, had been challenging Louisiana's non-unanimous jury conviction law since his own 2007 conviction, had petitioned to the Supreme Court around the same time that Ramos had been under consideration, using collateral review (Ramos dealt with direct review). Following the decision of Ramos, Edwards altered his petition to the Supreme Court to ask if the Ramos decision should be held retroactively to defendants who had already exhausted all appeals. The court accepted Edwards' case under Edwards v. Vannoy, and oral arguments were held on December 2, 2020.

On May 17, 2021, the Supreme Court ruled that the Ramos jury-unanimity rule does not apply retroactively on federal collateral review. Subsequently, the Oregon Supreme Court ruled in December 2022 that the Ramos decision should be applied retroactively to cases within the state.
