= 1893 Atlantic hurricane season =

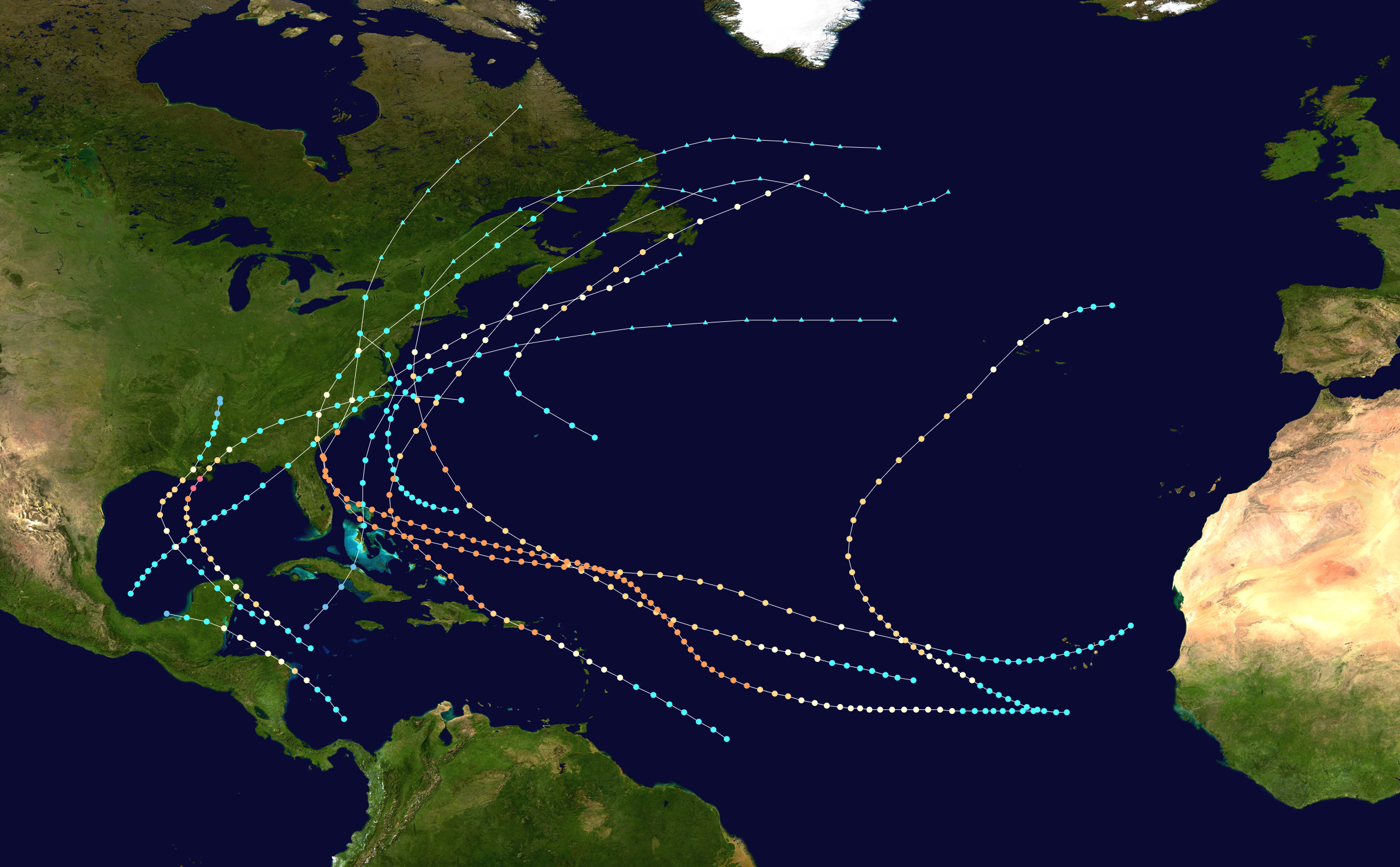
- Season summary map

Seasonal boundaries
- First system formed: June 12, 1893
- Last system dissipated: November 9, 1893

Strongest storm
- Name: "Cheniere Caminada"
  - Maximum winds: 130 mph (215 km/h) (1-minute sustained)
  - Lowest pressure: 948 mbar (hPa; 27.99 inHg)

Seasonal statistics
- Total depressions: 12
- Total storms: 12
- Hurricanes: 10
- Major hurricanes (Cat. 3+): 5
- ACE: 231 (third highest)
- Total fatalities: >3,191
- Total damage: At least $7.04 million (1893 USD)

Related article
- 1890s North Indian Ocean cyclone seasons

The 1893 Atlantic hurricane season featured the only known instance of more than one tropical cyclone causing at least 1,000 deaths in the United States. It was a fairly active season, with 12 tropical storms forming, 10 of which became hurricanes. Of those, five became major hurricanes. (Note: A major hurricane is a storm that ranks as Category 3 or higher on the Saffir–Simpson hurricane wind scale.) The season is considered hyper-active in terms of accumulated cyclone energy, achieving a total of 231 units, which was the highest ever recorded at the time and remains the third-highest ever recorded in the Atlantic basin. Additionally, 1893 became one of two seasons on record to see four Atlantic hurricanes active simultaneously, along with 1998. In the absence of modern satellite and other remote-sensing technologies, only storms that affected populated land areas or encountered ships at sea were recorded, so the actual total could be higher. An undercount bias of zero to six tropical cyclones per year between 1851 and 1885 and zero to four per year between 1886 and 1910 has been estimated. The first system was initially observed on June 12 in the Bay of Campeche, while the twelfth and final storm transitioned into an extratropical cyclone on November 9 over the northwestern Atlantic.

Neither the reanalysis by meteorologists José Fernández-Partagás and Henry F. Diaz in 1996 nor the Atlantic hurricane reanalysis project added or removed any storms from the official hurricane database (HURDAT), though the former revised the tracks of a few systems and the latter upgraded two cyclones to major hurricane intensity. However, a study by climate researcher Michael Chenoweth, published in 2014, lists thirteen tropical cyclones, proposing the removal of fifth, eleventh, and twelfth systems as well as the addition of four new storms, but his reanalysis has yet to be added to HURDAT.

The most intense tropical cyclone of the season, the tenth system, peaked as a Category 4 hurricane on the present-day Saffir–Simpson scale with maximum sustained winds of 130 mph (215 km/h). On October 2, the hurricane struck Louisiana, causing approximately 2,000 fatalities and about $5 million (1893 USD) in damage. (Note: All damage figures are in 1893 USD, unless otherwise noted) Another very deadly cyclone, the season's sixth system, brought devastating storm surge and high winds to the Sea Islands region of the Southeastern United States and nearby inland areas in late August, killing at least 1,000 people and inflicting damage totaling about $1 million. In mid-October, the ninth system also impacted South Carolina but caused death and devastation as far inland as Ontario, with 100 fatalities and well over $1 million in damage. The third and fourth storms caused 37 and 34 deaths, respectively, most due to maritime incidents along the coasts of the United States and Atlantic Canada. Additionally, the seventh and eighth systems killed five people each. Overall, the storms of the 1893 Atlantic hurricane season collectively caused more than $7 million in damage and more than 3,191 fatalities.

== Season summary ==
Most intense Atlantic hurricane seasons (since 1850) (Note: There is an undercount bias of zero to six tropical cyclones per year between 1851 and 1885 and zero to four per year between 1886 and 1910, due to the lack of modern observation techniques, see Tropical cyclone observation. This may have led to significantly lower ACE ratings for hurricane seasons prior to 1910.)
| Rank | Season | ACE value |
|---|---|---|
| 1 | 1933 | 258.6 |
| 2 | 2005 | 245.3 |
| 3 | 1893 | 231.1 |
| 4 | 1926 | 229.6 |
| 5 | 1995 | 227.1 |
| 6 | 2004 | 226.9 |
| 7 | 2017 | 224.9 |
| 8 | 1950 | 211.3 |
| 9 | 1961 | 188.9 |
| 10 | 1998 | 181.8 |
(source)

The Atlantic hurricane database (HURDAT) officially recognizes that twelve tropical cyclones formed during the 1893 season, ten of which strengthened into a hurricane, with five of those intensifying into a major hurricane. The Atlantic hurricane reanalysis project did not add or remove any storms from the 1996 reanalysis of the season by meteorologists José Fernández-Partagás and Henry F. Diaz, but upgraded the third and fourth systems to major hurricane status. However, a more recent reanalysis by climate researcher Michael Chenoweth, published in 2014, adds four storms and removes three others—the fifth, eleventh, and twelfth systems—for a net gain of one cyclone, although these proposed changes have yet to be approved for inclusion to HURDAT.

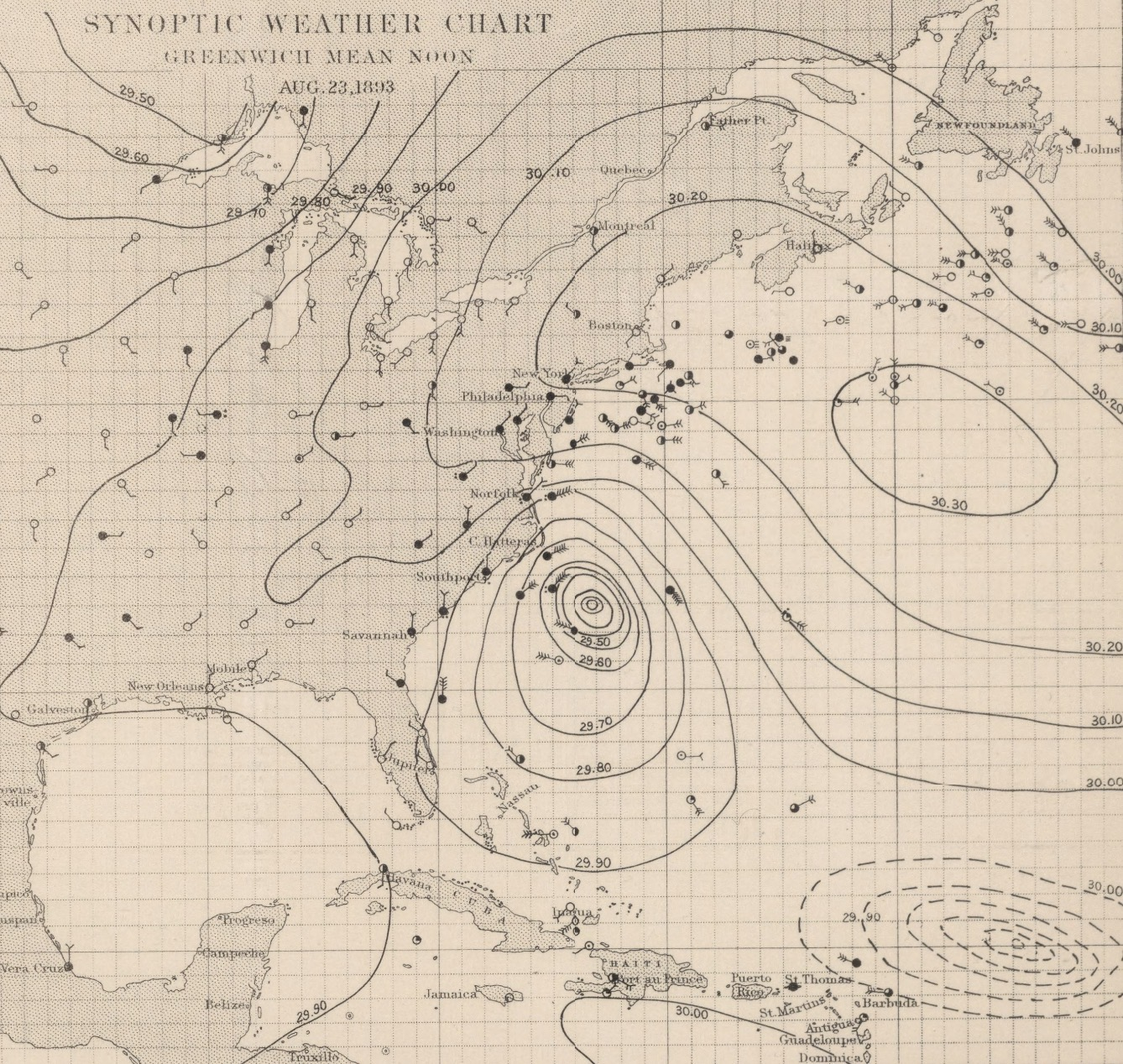
Synoptic map showing two active Atlantic hurricanes on August 23, one would approach New York City, and the other storm (bottom right) passes to the north of the Lesser Antilles, it would impact the Coast of Georgia and South Carolina a couple of days later

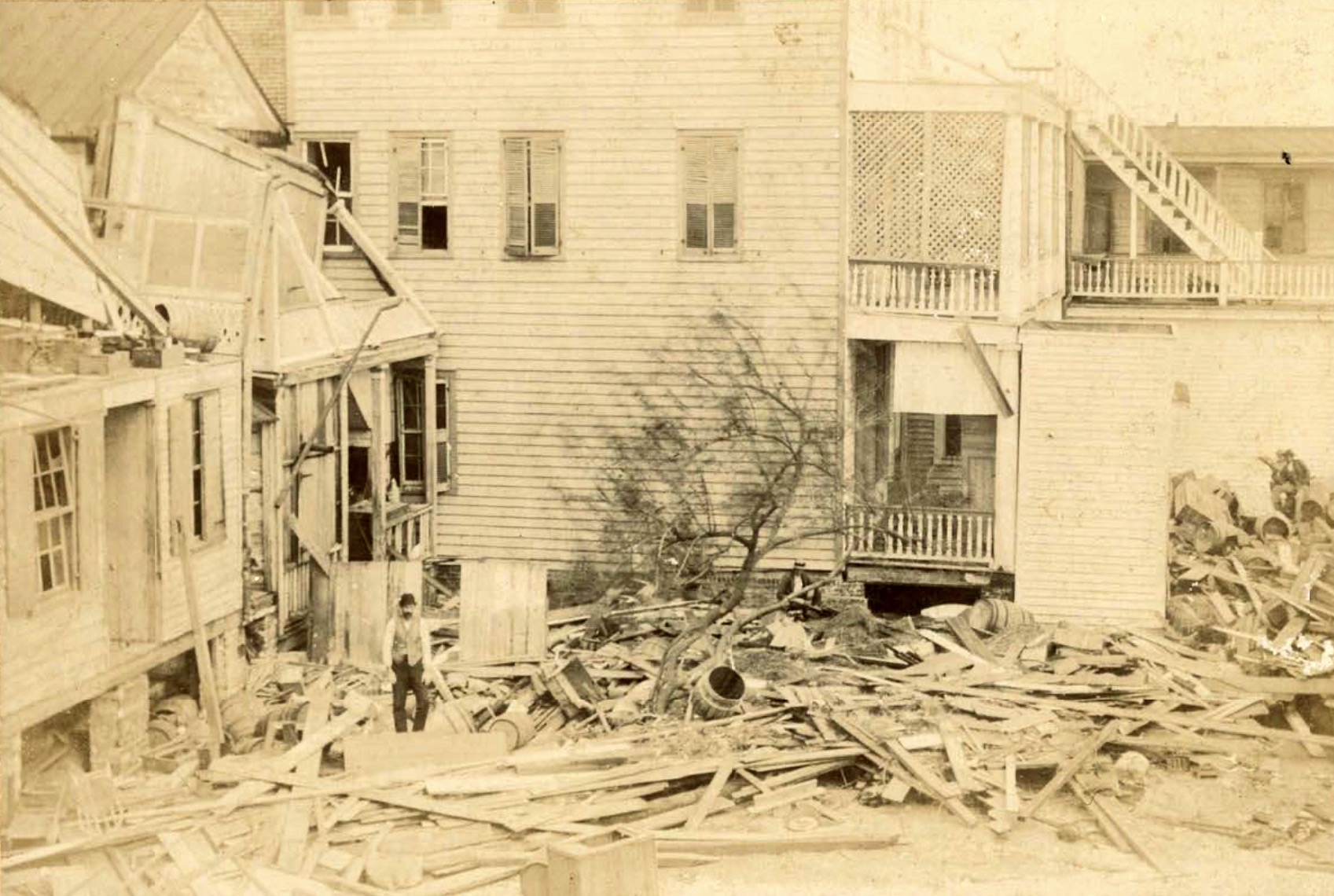
Damaged homes in Beaufort, South Carolina, as a result of the Sea Islands hurricane

On June 12, ships initially detected the first known tropical cyclone of the season over the Bay of Campeche. After crossing the Southeastern United States, the storm intensified into a hurricane, but became extratropical on June 19. July also featured one system, which peaked as a Category 2 hurricane on the present-day Saffir–Simpson scale and made landfall in Nicaragua and Belize (then known as British Honduras). Tropical cyclogenesis increased significantly in August, with five cyclones, all of which intensified into at least a Category 2 hurricane. On August 22, the season's third, fourth, sixth, and seventh all existed at hurricane intensity. The only other instance of four active simultaneous hurricanes in the Atlantic occurred on September 25, 1998. Three storms, each also all hurricanes, are known to have developed in September. The season's tenth system, which formed on September 27, became the most intense of the season on October 2, peaking as a Category 4 with maximum sustained winds of 130 mph (215 km/h) and a minimum atmospheric pressure of 948 mbar (28.0 inHg). One cyclone each formed in October and November. The season's twelfth and final known system transitioned into an extratropical cyclone on November 9 over the northwestern Atlantic.

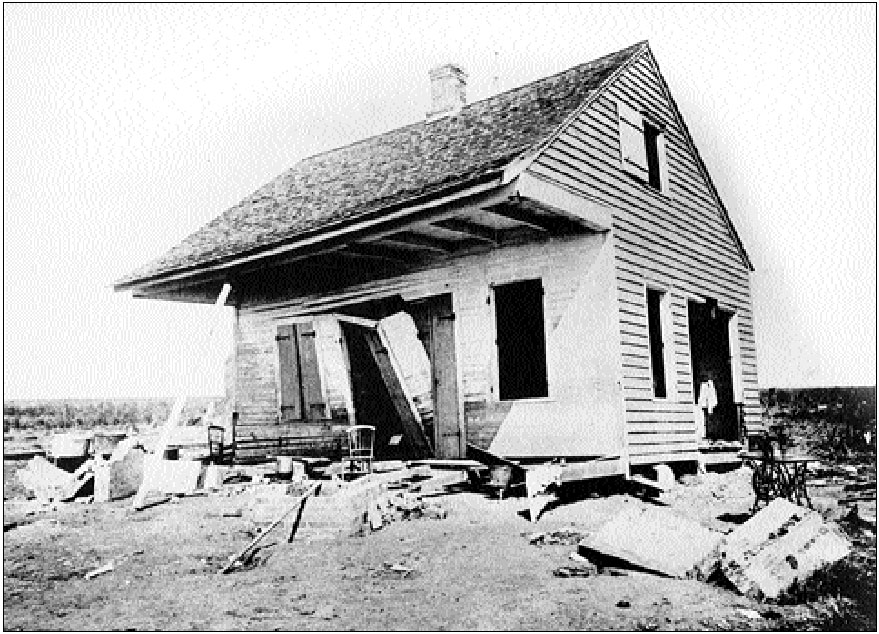
Destruction inflicted by the "Cheniere Caminada hurricane" in Louisiana

Extensive impacts and a large number of deaths occurred as a result of cyclones during the 1893 season, especially in the United States. The country experienced five hurricane landfalls, with three of those being major hurricanes, becoming one of only four seasons on record in which at least three systems achieving that intensity struck the United States, the others being 1909, 2004, and 2005. Both the sixth and tenth systems, also known as the Sea Islands and Cheniere Caminada hurricanes, respectively, caused at least 1,000 fatalities, the only known season with more than one system resulting in that many deaths in the United States. While both storms may have killed as many as 2,000 people each, the National Hurricane Center estimated the seasonal nationwide death toll at 3,000. Consequently, the 1893 hurricane season remains one of the deadliest in United States history. Throughout the basin, the cyclones of the 1893 Atlantic hurricane season collectively caused more than $7.04 million in damage and over 3,191 fatalities.

The season's activity was reflected with an accumulated cyclone energy (ACE) rating of approximately 231, the third-highest total ever recorded, behind only 2005 and 1933. The ninth system alone achieved an ACE rating of around 63.5, one of the highest values ever recorded for an individual storm. ACE is a metric used to express the energy used by a tropical cyclone during its lifetime. Therefore, a storm with a longer duration will have higher values of ACE. It is only calculated at six-hour increments in which specific tropical and subtropical systems are either at or above sustained wind speeds of 39 mph (63 km/h), which is the threshold for tropical storm intensity. Thus, tropical depressions are not included here.

== Systems ==
=== Hurricane One ===
- Category 1 hurricane (SSHWS)
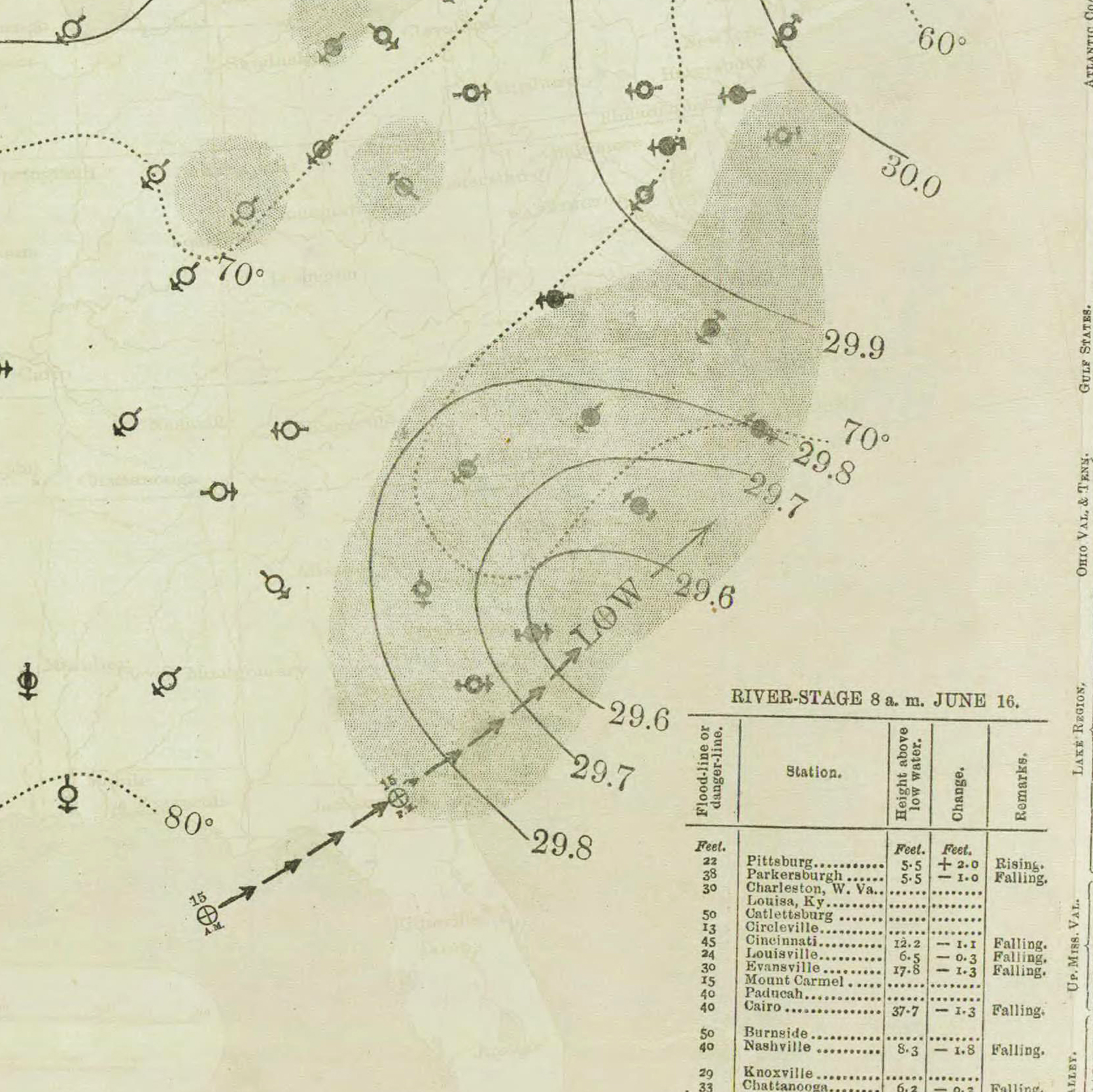
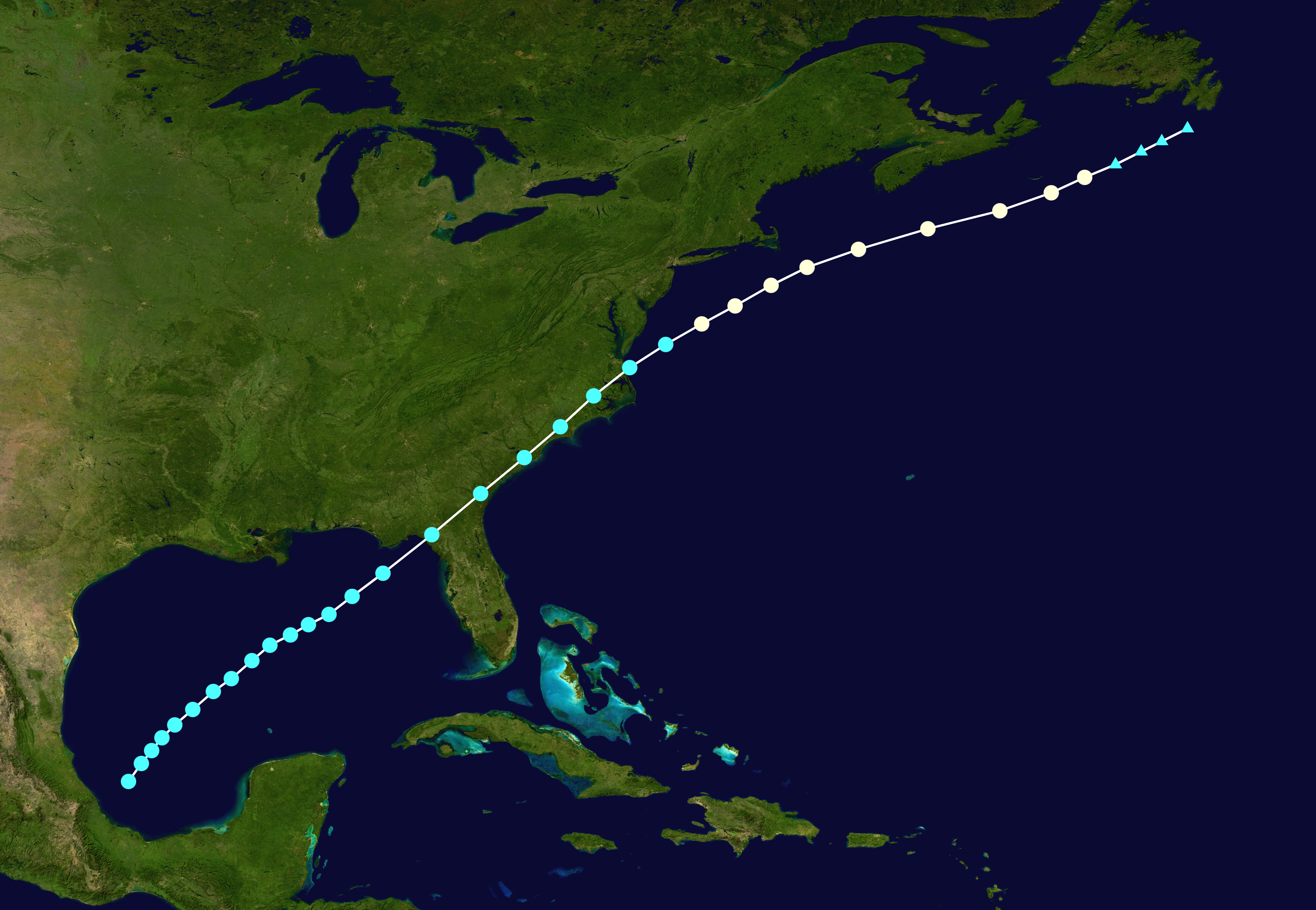
- Duration: June 12 – June 19
- Peak intensity: 80 mph (130 km/h) (1-min);

Observations from ships indicated the presence of a tropical storm in the Bay of Campeche on June 12. The storm moved northeastward across the Gulf of Mexico and intensified into a strong tropical storm. Around 23:00 UTC on June 15, the system made landfall southwest of Perry, Florida, with winds of 70 mph (110 km/h). The cyclone weakened somewhat while moving over Florida and coastal portions of Georgia and the Carolinas. After emerging into the Atlantic near the North Carolina–Virginia state line early on June 17, the storm strengthened, reaching hurricane intensity later that day. On June 19, a ship located in the vicinity of the storm recorded a barometric pressure around 999 mbar (29.5 inHg) - the lowest in relation to the cyclone. However, the system then started losing tropical characteristics and transitioned into an extratropical cyclone about 155 mi (250 km) south of Saint Pierre and Miquelon by 00:00 UTC on June 20.

Several locations in the Southeastern United States observed tropical storm-force winds, with the strongest recorded sustained wind speed being 54 mph (87 km/h) in Charleston, South Carolina. In Florida, the storm prostrated many fences and trees in the Tallahassee area. One building in St. Marks was destroyed and water surrounded many other structures. Several towns in southern Georgia reported the destruction of about half of their pear crops and significant losses to corn. A 2014 renalysis study by climate scientist Michael Chenoweth created a mostly similar path, albeit showing a landfall farther west over Florida and then the storm moving east of North Carolina. Chenoweth also concluded that the system did not intensify into a hurricane.

=== Hurricane Two ===
- Category 2 hurricane (SSHWS)
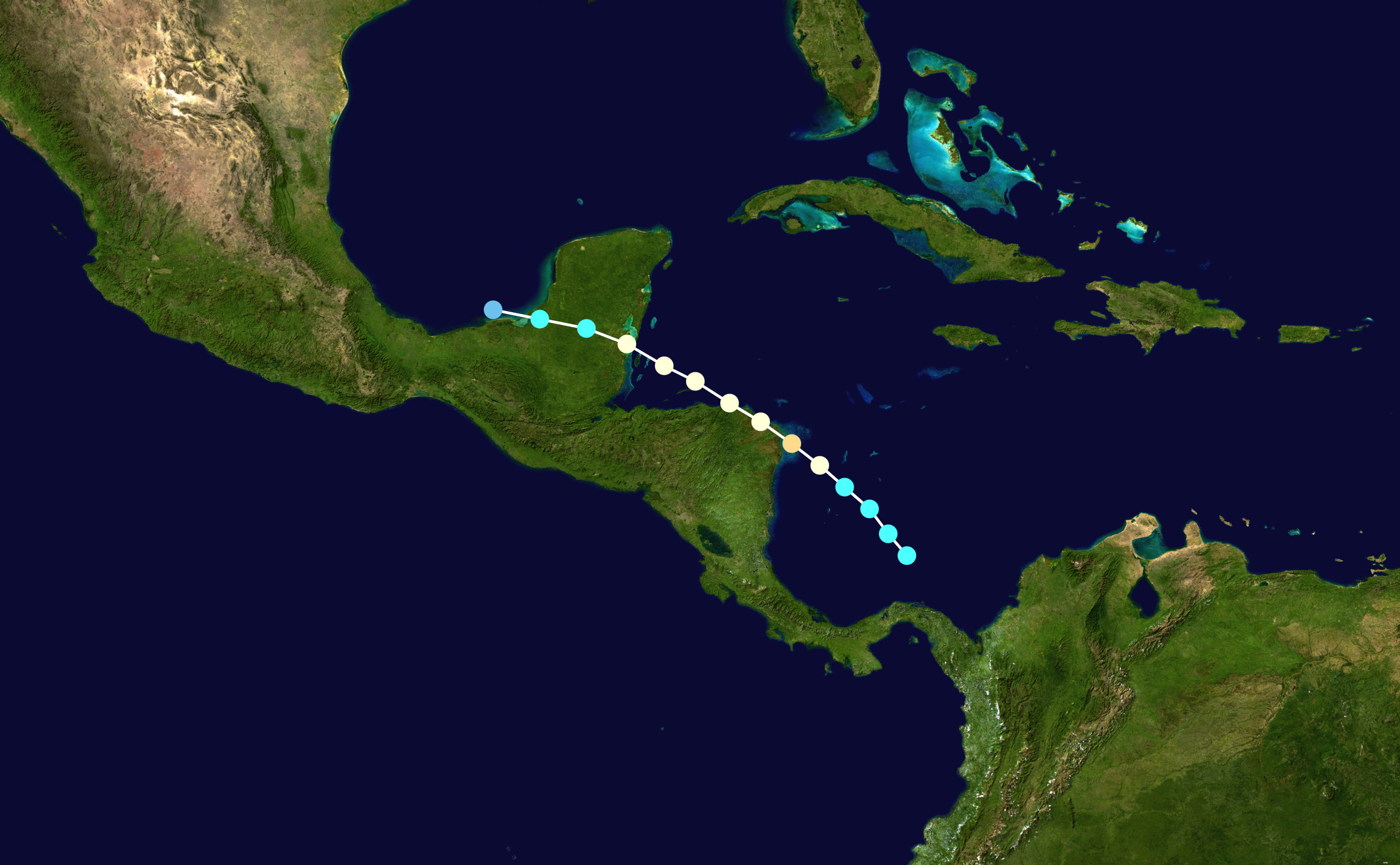
- Duration: July 4 – July 7
- Peak intensity: 100 mph (155 km/h) (1-min);

Observations of this storm began as early as July 4 in the southwestern Caribbean Sea, with a ship encountering the cyclone about 130 mi (210 km) north-northeast of Colón, Panama. The system intensified steadily while moving northwestward, becoming a hurricane around 12:00 UTC on the following day. About six hours later, the storm intensified into a Category 2 hurricane and peaked with winds of 100 mph (155 km/h). The hurricane then made landfall near the Nicaragua–Honduras border. The cyclone weakened back to a Category 1 before re-emerging into the Caribbean off the north coast of Honduras early on July 6. Continuing northwestward, the system then re-strengthened slightly, reaching winds of 90 mph (150 km/h) prior to making landfall in northern Belize around 00:00 UTC on July 7. The cyclone weakened rapidly over the Yucatán Peninsula and dissipated just offshore Tabasco several hours later.

The storm sank several ships, including many steamers loaded with fruit in Honduras. About 6,000 bunches of bananas awaiting shipment were washed away at Bonito, while fruit plantations also experienced extensive damage. A number of homes on Roatán were also severely damaged. The hurricane reportedly caused a large loss of life. It has been paleotempestologically traced in sediment near Gales Point in Belize. Chenoweth's study indicated that the storm struck near the Nicaragua–Honduras but at a west-northwest angle rather than in a northwestward trajectory. The cyclone then struck southern Belize, crossed the Bay of Campeche, and moved ashore in Veracruz before dissipating on July 9.

=== Hurricane Three ===
- Category 3 hurricane (SSHWS)
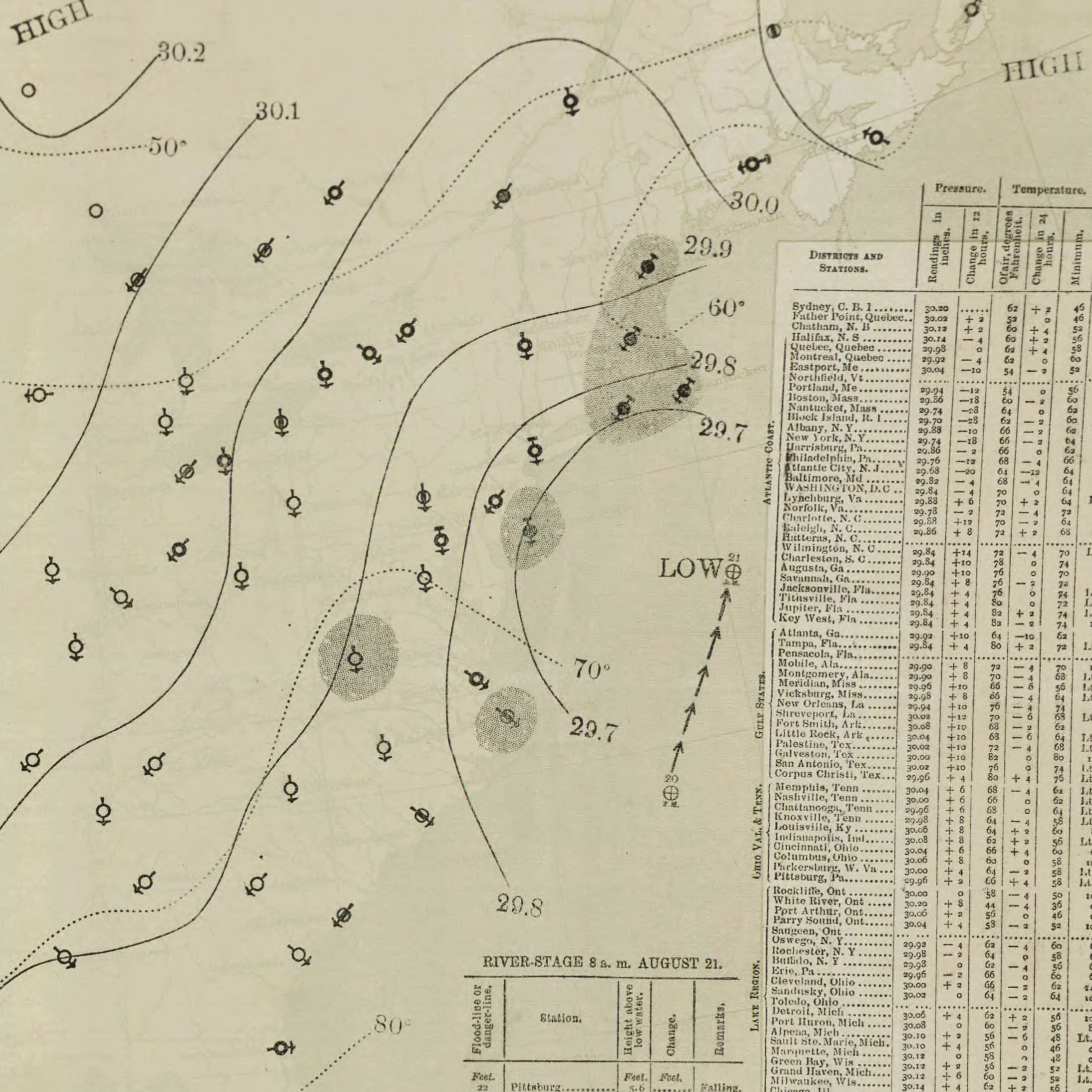
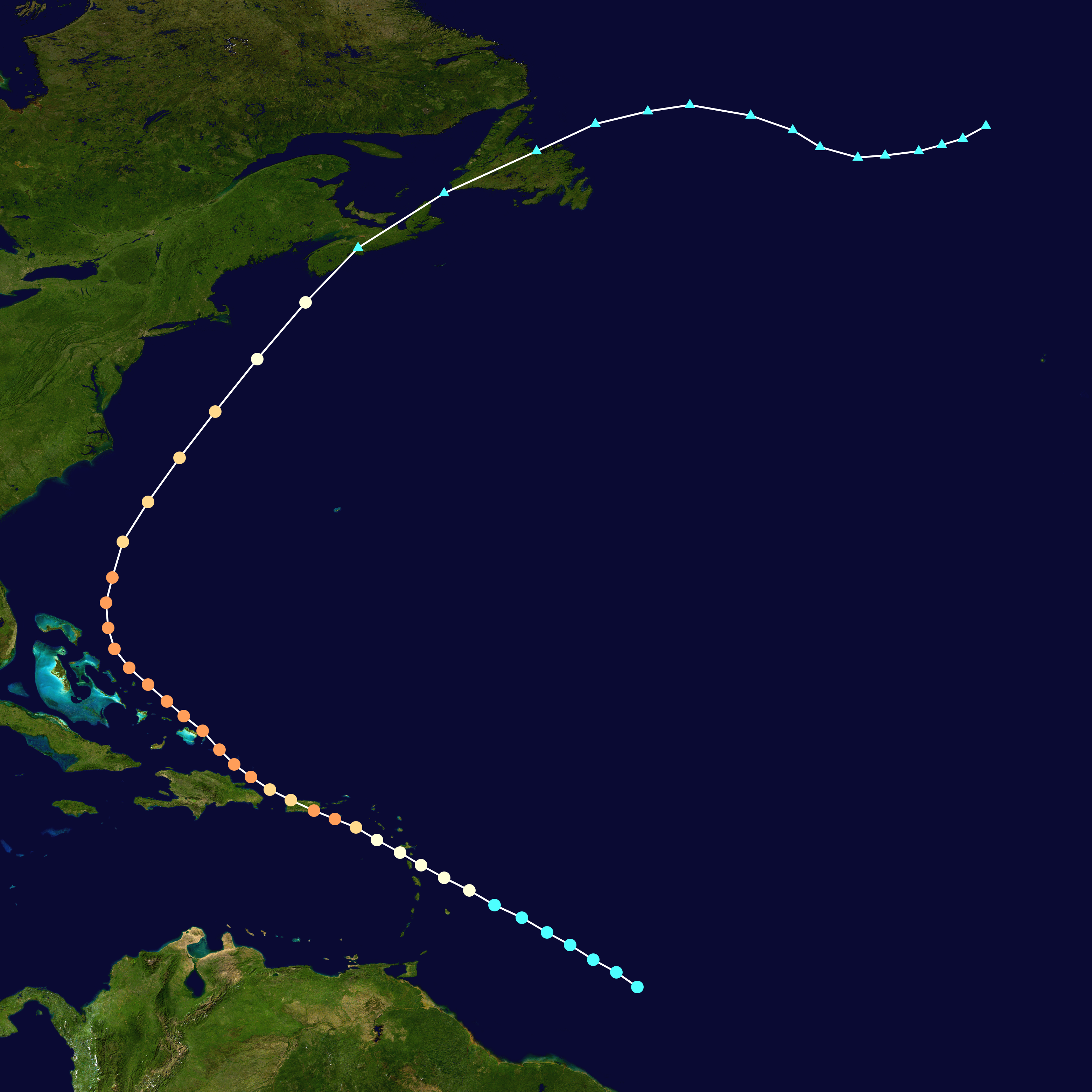
- Duration: August 13 – August 22
- Peak intensity: 120 mph (195 km/h) (1-min); <988 mbar (hPa)

Based on a reanalysis conducted by meteorologist Ivan Ray Tannehill in 1938, the Atlantic hurricane database begins the track of this storm about 730 mi (1,175 km) east of Trinidad and Tobago on August 13. Moving northwestward, the cyclone intensified into a hurricane by August 15, several hours before passing between Dominica and Guadeloupe. While approaching Puerto Rico on August 16, its winds increased to major hurricane status before landfall at Patillas. The eye remained over Puerto Rico for a period of seven hours. San Juan recorded a barometric pressure of just under 988 mbar (29.2 inHg). Although landfall weakened the storm to a Category 2 hurricane, it regained major hurricane status while approaching the Bahamas. On August 19, the hurricane turned northward near the Bahamas, followed by a curve to the northeast on the next day. The system then weakened and began losing tropical characteristics, becoming extratropical early on August 22. Shortly thereafter, the extratropical remnants made landfall near Halifax, Nova Scotia, at the equivalency of a Category 1 hurricane. Crossing Nova Scotia and then Newfoundland, the extratropical remnants reached the far north Atlantic and dissipated on August 25.

Stormy conditions occurred in the Lesser Antilles from Martinique to the Virgin Islands. In Saint Thomas, the cyclone damaged boats and docks, uprooted trees, and unroofed homes. Strong winds on Puerto Rico caused widespread destruction, with large numbers of homes suffering some degree of damage. Telegraph communications were severed across the island. The combined effects of wind and several days of heavy rainfall destroyed fields of crops, especially coffee and sugar cane. Four people died on Puerto Rico. Despite remaining well offshore, the hurricane produced heavy rainfall and gale-force winds across East Coast of the United States, including sustained winds of 72 mph (116 km/h) on Block Island, Rhode Island. Across Rhode Island and Massachusetts, the storm flattened grain crops and stripped orchards of their fruits. Among several maritime incidents, the schooner Mary Lizzie sank off Nantucket, with only one of the seven crew members surviving. In Nova Scotia, damage to utility wires in Halifax cut power and communications services, and a child was killed by a downed power line. The storm wrought havoc on ships and boats throughout Atlantic Canada, claiming 26 lives after vessels capsized. After the storm struck Puerto Rico, Chenoweth's study argued that the cyclone remained farther east of the Bahamas than recorded in HURDAT and later on struck near the east end of Nova Scotia.

=== Hurricane Four ===
- Category 3 hurricane (SSHWS)
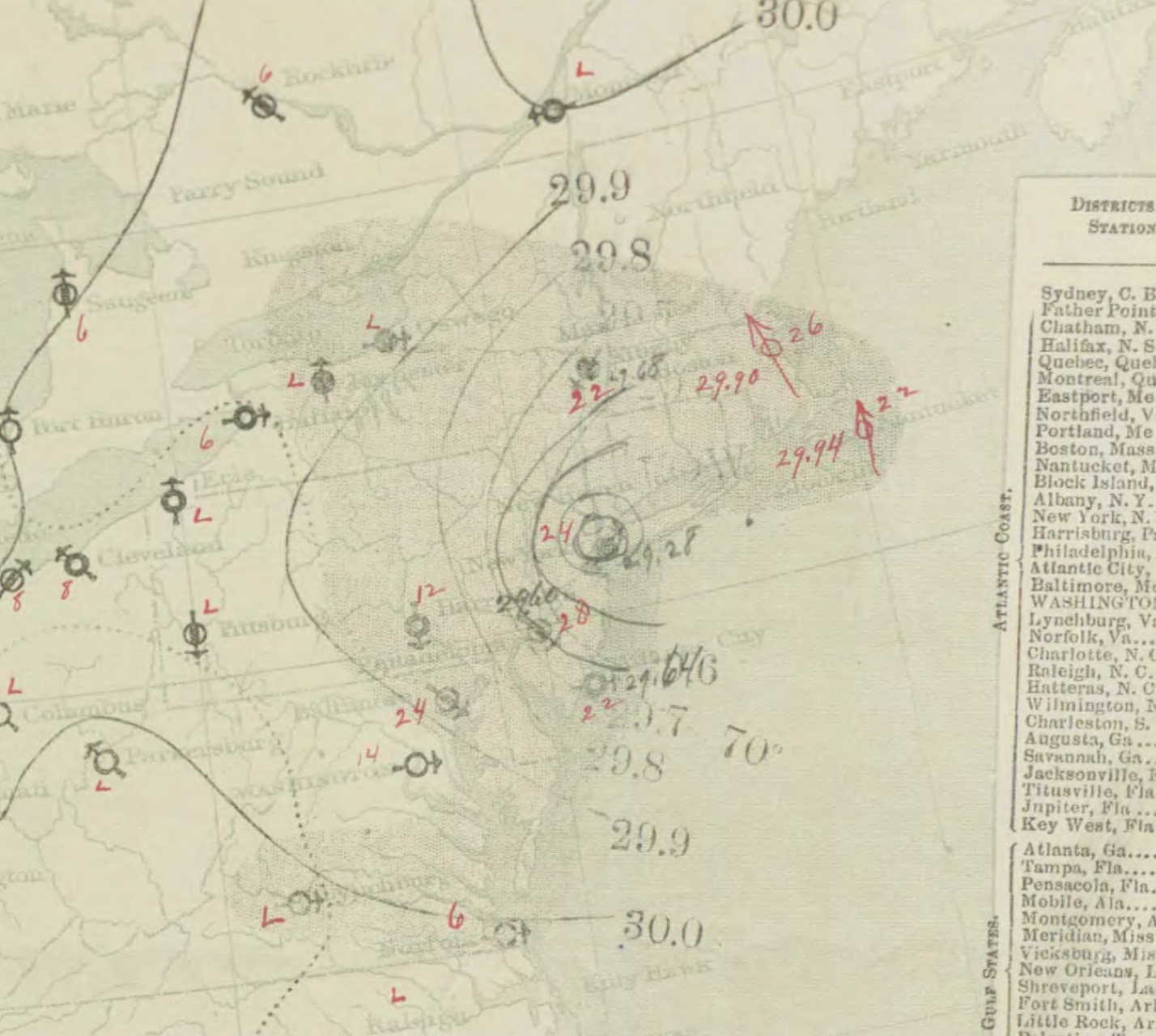
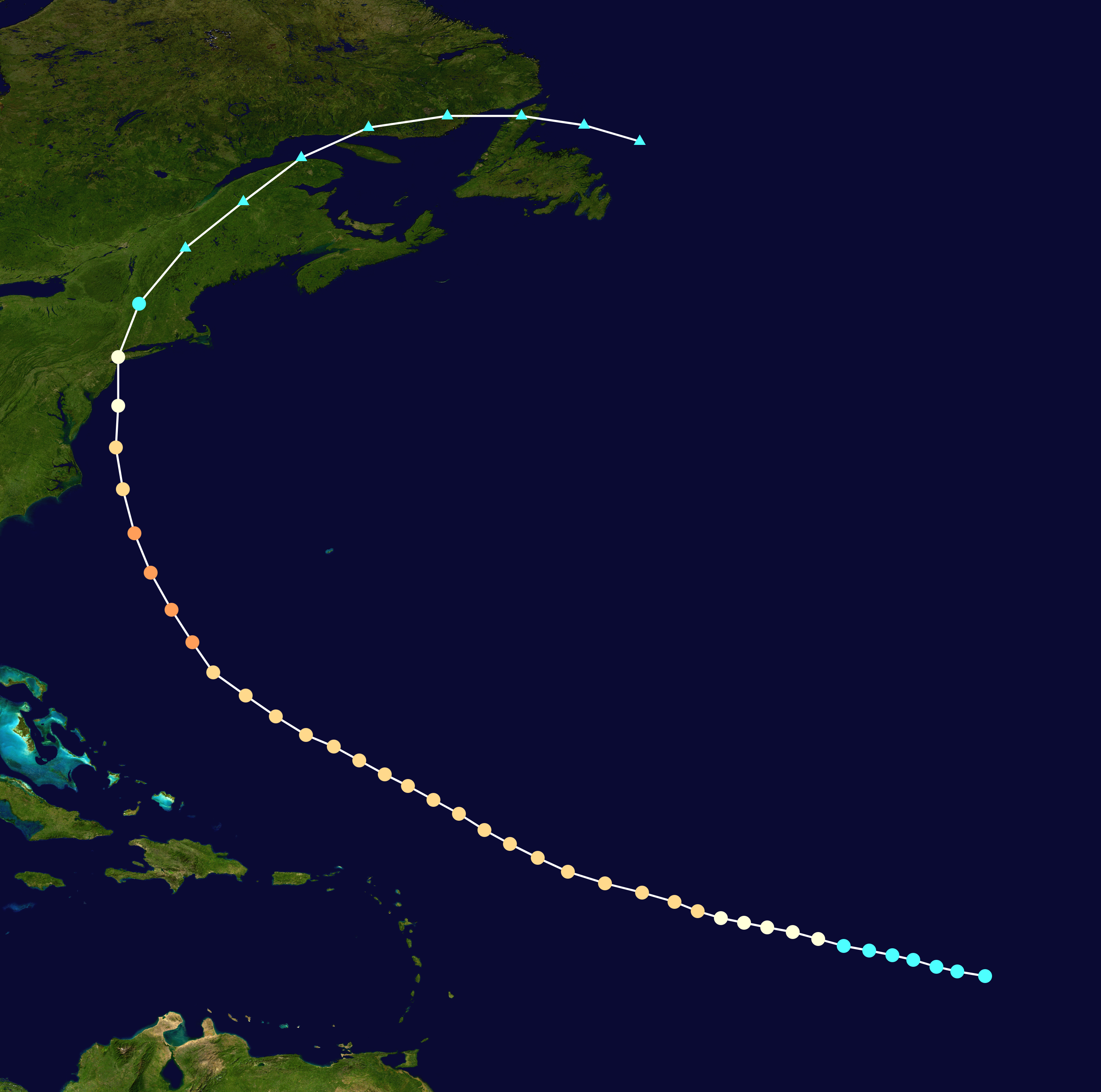
- Duration: August 15 – August 24
- Peak intensity: 115 mph (185 km/h) (1-min); 952 mbar (hPa)

This storm was first observed over the southeastern Atlantic on August 15, with the official track beginning about 790 mi (1,270 km) of the Cabo Verde Islands. Initially a tropical storm, the cyclone is estimated to have intensified into a hurricane by August 15 as it moved west-northwestward. The storm gradually moved more northwestward for the next several days, until turning north-northwestward on August 22. That day, the system strengthened into a major Category 3 hurricane with winds of 115 mph (185 km/h), based on the bark Glencoyn observing an atmospheric pressure of 952 mbar (28.1 inHg) early on August 23. Thereafter, the cyclone weakened as it moved generally northward. Shortly before 12:00 UTC on August 24, the storm made landfall in New York City as a Category 1 hurricane with winds of 85 mph (140 km/h). Curving north-northeastward, the system weakened to a tropical storm and then transitioned into an extratropical cyclone later that day over Quebec. The extratropical remnants dissipated east of Newfoundland on August 26. Chenoweth proposed few changes to the storm's duration, track, or intensity, mainly other than adding a tropical depression stage beginning on August 13.

Strong winds occurred in North Carolina, including gusts of 70 mph (110 km/h) in Kitty Hawk and 60 mph (95 km/h) in Hatteras. Despite the storm's close proximity to New Jersey, the state likely did not experience hurricane force-winds because of the system's motion and asymmetrical wind field. Nonetheless, Jersey City experienced its worst storm in several years. The hurricane capsized or beached numerous boats and vessels in the vicinity of New York City, leading to 34 deaths, 17 from the tugboat Panther alone. At Coney Island, the storm demolished a number of buildings, walkways, piers, and resorts, while many homes were destroyed in Brooklyn. Hundreds of thousands of dollars in damage occurred in New York City. Meteorologists Gordon E. Dunn and Banner I. Miller noted in 1960 that major damage occurred in Connecticut and Rhode Island. In New Haven, Connecticut, the storm toppled about 1,000 elm and maple trees, blocking many streets. Surrounding communities reported unroofed homes and barns and downed fences and trees. Additionally, The Boston Globe noted that "Crops of all kinds are a total loss." In western Massachusetts, the storm downed many wires and badly damaged corn and tobacco crops.

=== Hurricane Five ===
- Category 2 hurricane (SSHWS)
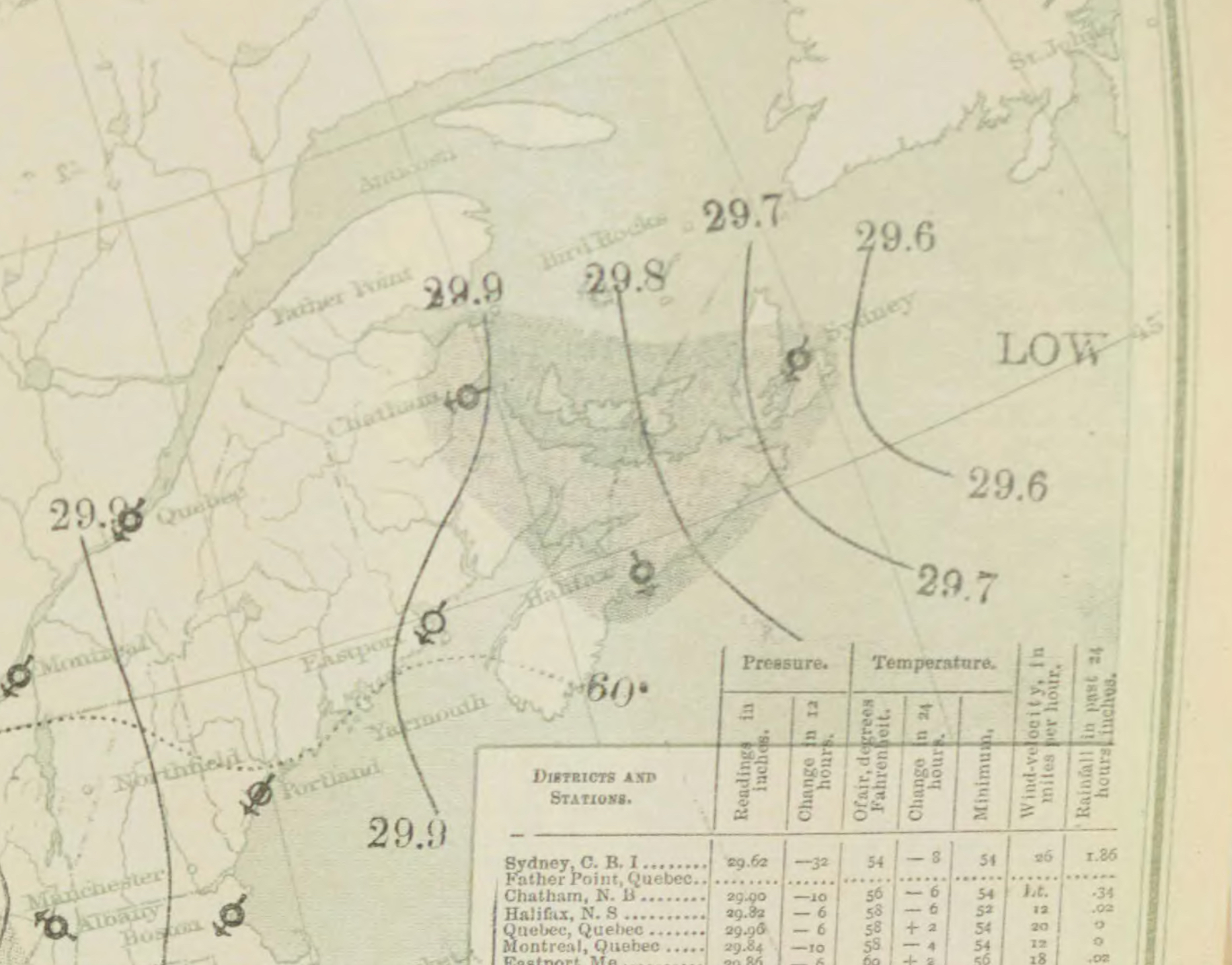
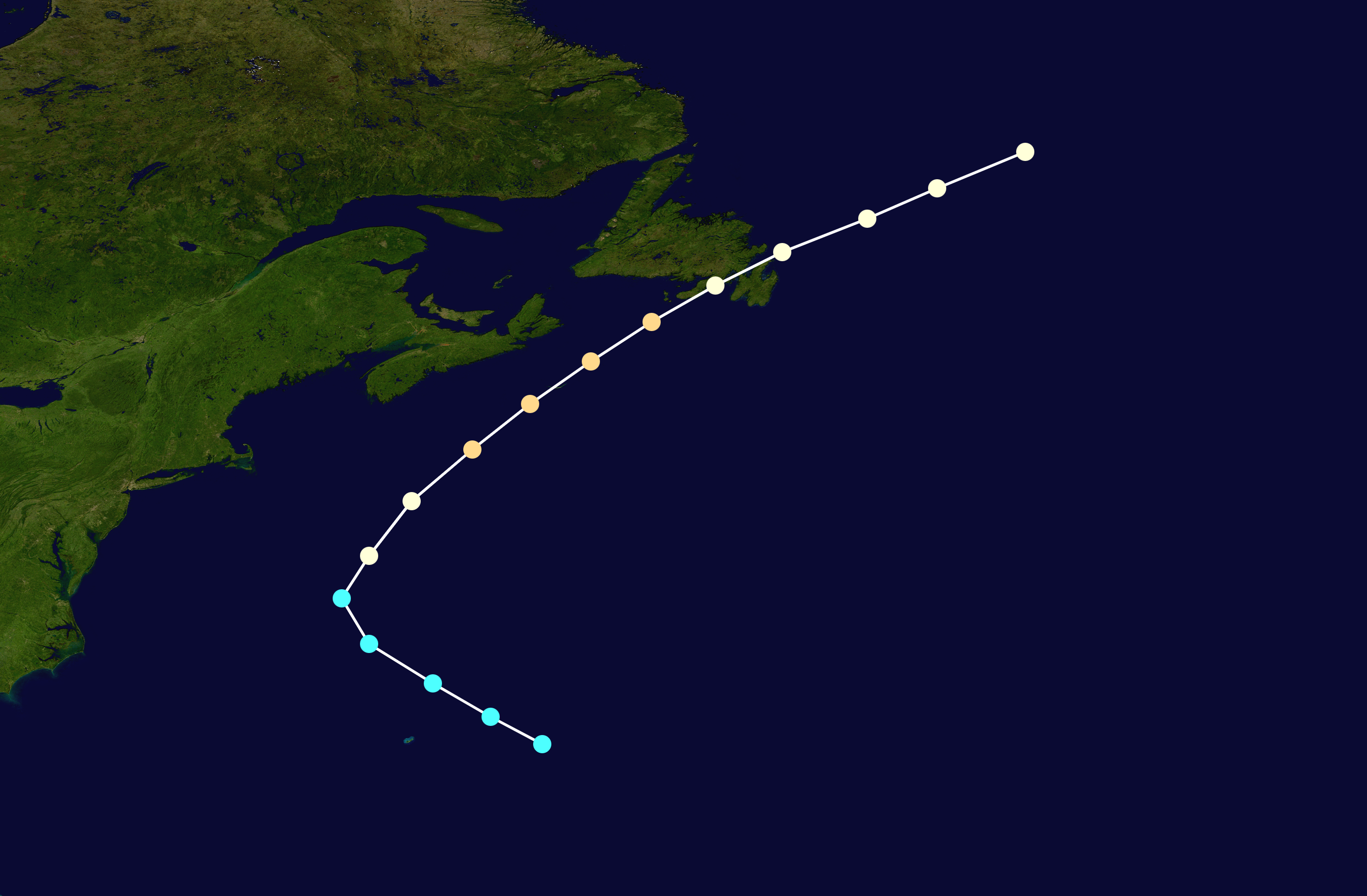
- Duration: August 15 – August 19
- Peak intensity: 100 mph (155 km/h) (1-min);

The August 1893 edition of Monthly Weather Review notes that Bermuda first observed this cyclone on August 15. Therefore, the official track begins about 250 mi (400 km) east of the island that day. No observations of at least gale-force sustained winds, other than the report from Bermuda describing the system as a hurricane. Despite this, HURDAT indicates that the cyclone reached hurricane status late on August 16 and peaked as a 100 mph (155 km/h)-Category 2 hurricane early the next day as it moved northeastward. Early on August 18, the hurricane made landfall along the Burin Peninsula of Newfoundland and emerged into the far northern Atlantic several hours later. The system was last noted about 430 mi (690 km) northeast of Bonavista, Newfoundland and Labrador, on the following day.

In Nova Scotia, the storm beached three vessels at Gabarus, with the Mary Jane being completely destroyed. Portions of Cape Breton Island reportedly downed telegraph and telephone lines. Chenoweth proposed the removal of this system from HURDAT, finding "No convincing evidence for a tropical system" and arguing that data instead favored an extratropical cyclone.

=== Hurricane Six ===
- Category 3 hurricane (SSHWS)
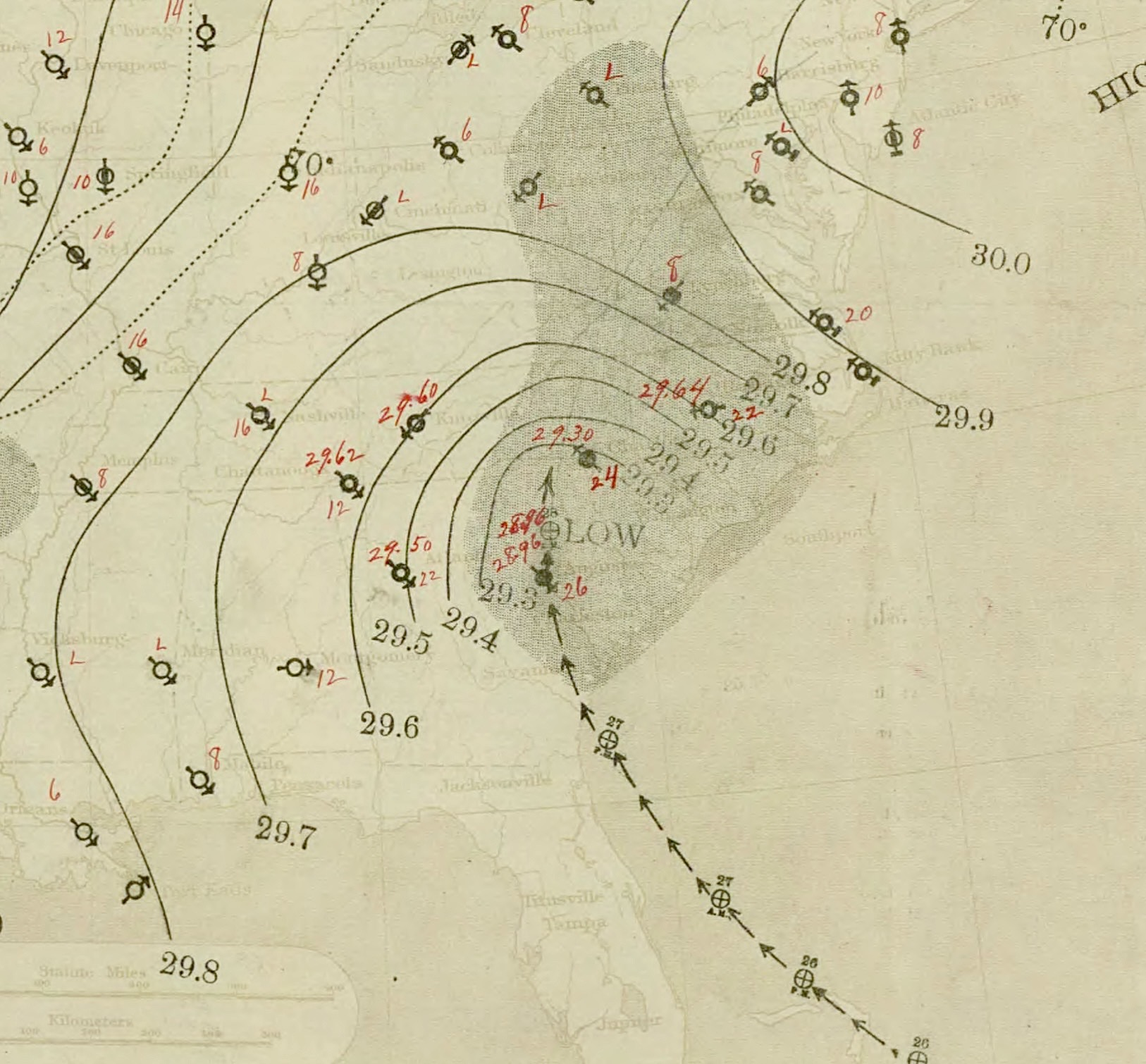
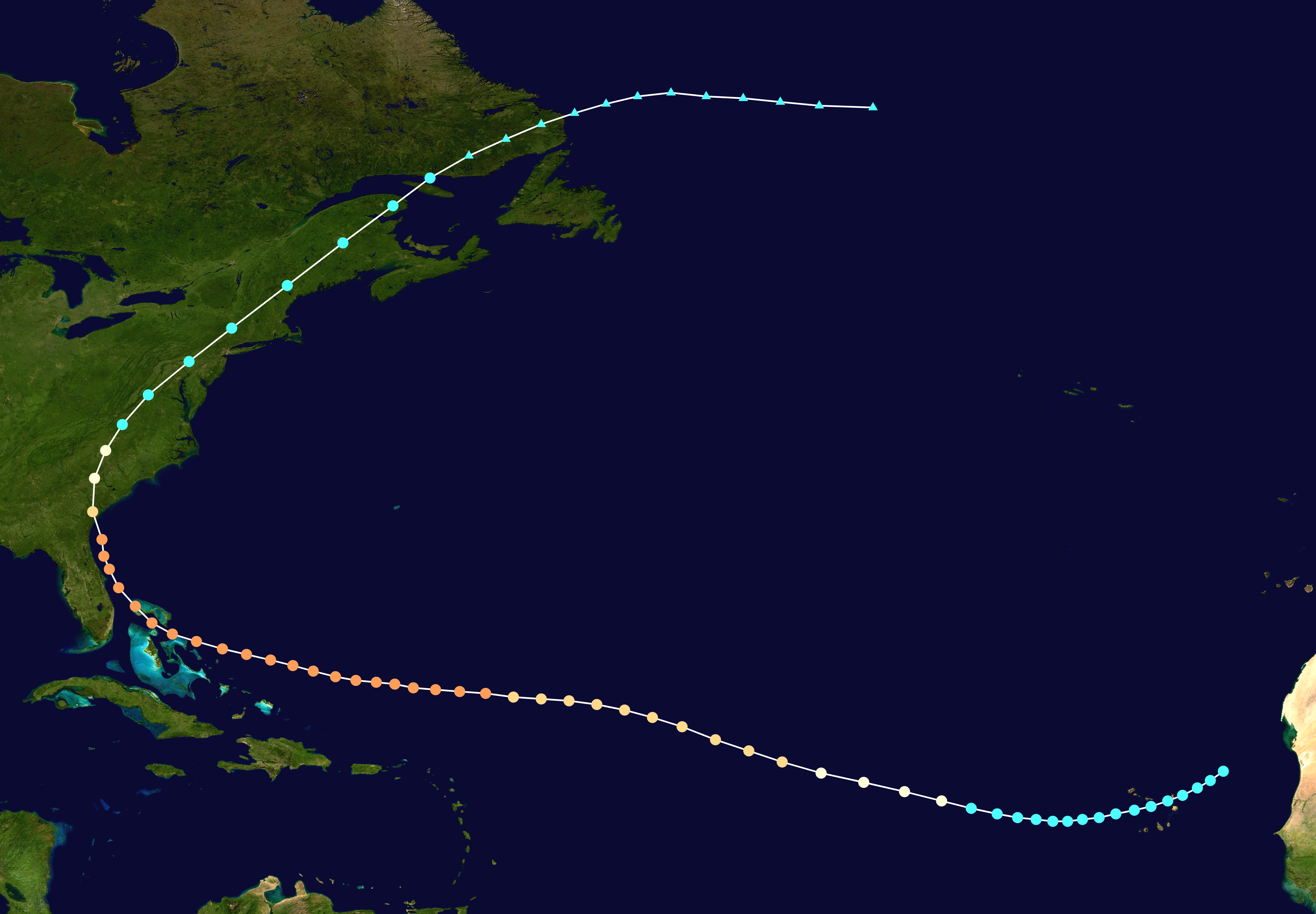
- Duration: August 15 – August 30
- Peak intensity: 120 mph (195 km/h) (1-min); 954 mbar (hPa)

Although no observations for this storm could be found prior to August 22, José Fernández-Partagás and Henry F. Diaz and the Atlantic hurricane reanalysis project retained C. J. Neumann's 1993 review of the system, which began the track on August 15. Located near the west coast of Africa, the tropical storm initially moved west-southwestward, passing through the Cabo Verde Islands on August 16 and August 17. By the following day, the system curved west-northward, and on August 19, intensified into a hurricane. The storm became a Category 3 early on August 23. Three days later, the hurricane curved northwestward while passing through the northern Bahamas, crossing or passing near Eleuthera, the Abaco Islands, and Grand Bahama. Curving north-northwestward on August 27, the cyclone remained just offshore Florida, and made landfall near Ossabaw Island, Georgia, early on August 28. Based on Savannah recording a barometric pressure of 954 mbar (28.2 inHg), the storm is estimated to have peaked with winds of 120 mph (195 km/h). The system weakened to a tropical storm as it curved northeastward over the Carolinas on August 29. After crossing the Mid-Atlantic, New England, and New Brunswick, the storm became extratropical over eastern Quebec by the following day. On September 2, the remnants were last noted over the far north Atlantic.

In Chenoweth's 2014 study, this storm followed a similar path to that listed in HURDAT but the cyclone approaching the Georgia–South Carolina state line at a northwestward angle, and thus, it neither crossed the Bahamas nor closely approached the east coast of Florida.

In the Bahamas, significant impacts were reported on the Abaco Islands, particularly at Marsh Harbour, with damage being "very large to houses, wharves, fences, boats, fields and in fact everything", according to The Nassau Guardian. Several sponging vessels sank at the Abaco Islands. The captain of the ship Sarah Emma reported flooding on Grand Bahama, which destroyed crops. In Florida, the storm downed hundreds of trees and partially or fully deroofed dozens of buildings, some as far as 50 mi (80 km) inland. Storm surge and abnormally high tides also caused damage, especially along the First Coast. Farther north, strong winds unroofed hundreds of buildings in Savannah, Georgia, where the hurricane was compared to a storm in 1881. However, the elevation and distance from the coast of the city left it relatively unscathed compared to the Sea Islands. Storm surge, which reached a peak estimated height of 18 ft (5.5 m) above ground in South Carolina, and abnormally high tides extensively flooded the islands and the cities of Beaufort, Charleston, and Port Royal, which reportedly had no structures elevated more than 2 ft (0.61 m) above ground. Additionally, intense winds left few homes undamaged in Beaufort and Port Royal. The National Hurricane Center places the death toll between 1,000–2,000, mostly in the Sea Islands, while the Red Cross estimated that approximately 30,000 survivors in the region became destitute. In North Carolina, high tides wrecked a number of vessels along the coast or just offshore. High winds caused severe impacts in Kernersville, including one death and the destruction of about 100 homes. Overall, damage from the storm totaled about $1 million.

=== Hurricane Seven ===
- Category 2 hurricane (SSHWS)
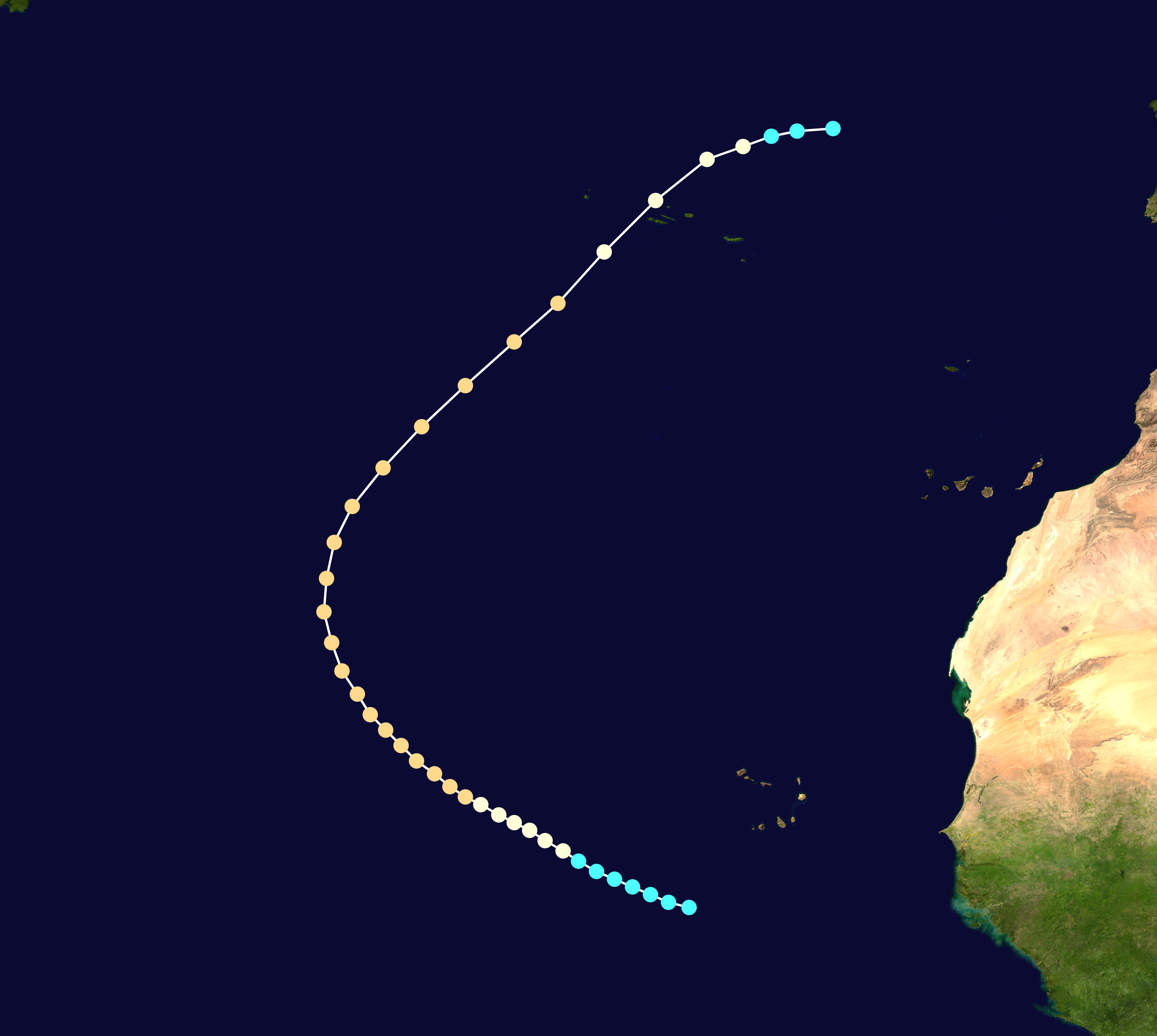
- Duration: August 20 – August 29
- Peak intensity: 100 mph (155 km/h) (1-min);

The official track for this storm begins on August 20 to the southwest of the Cabo Verde Islands, similar to the paths created by Charles Mitchell in 1924 and C. J. Neumann in 1993. Although very little information could be found in relation to the storm, it moved west-northwestward and is estimated to have intensified into a hurricane on August 22. By the following day, the system strengthened into a Category 2 hurricane with winds of 100 mph (155 km/h). Turning northeastward on August 26, the hurricane crossed the Azores, moving near Faial Island. The cyclone weakened to a tropical storm early on August 29 and was last noted northeast of the Azores several hours later.

The hurricane destroyed 14 homes on Faial Island and 28 others on Terceira Island and ruined crops. Three ships in the vicinity of the Azores were lost, while two remained missing by September 2. At least five people died in the archipelago. A reanalysis study by Chenoweth in 2014 proposed that this cyclone developed several hours later as a tropical depression and that the storm instead peaked as a Category 1 hurricane.

=== Hurricane Eight ===
- Category 2 hurricane (SSHWS)
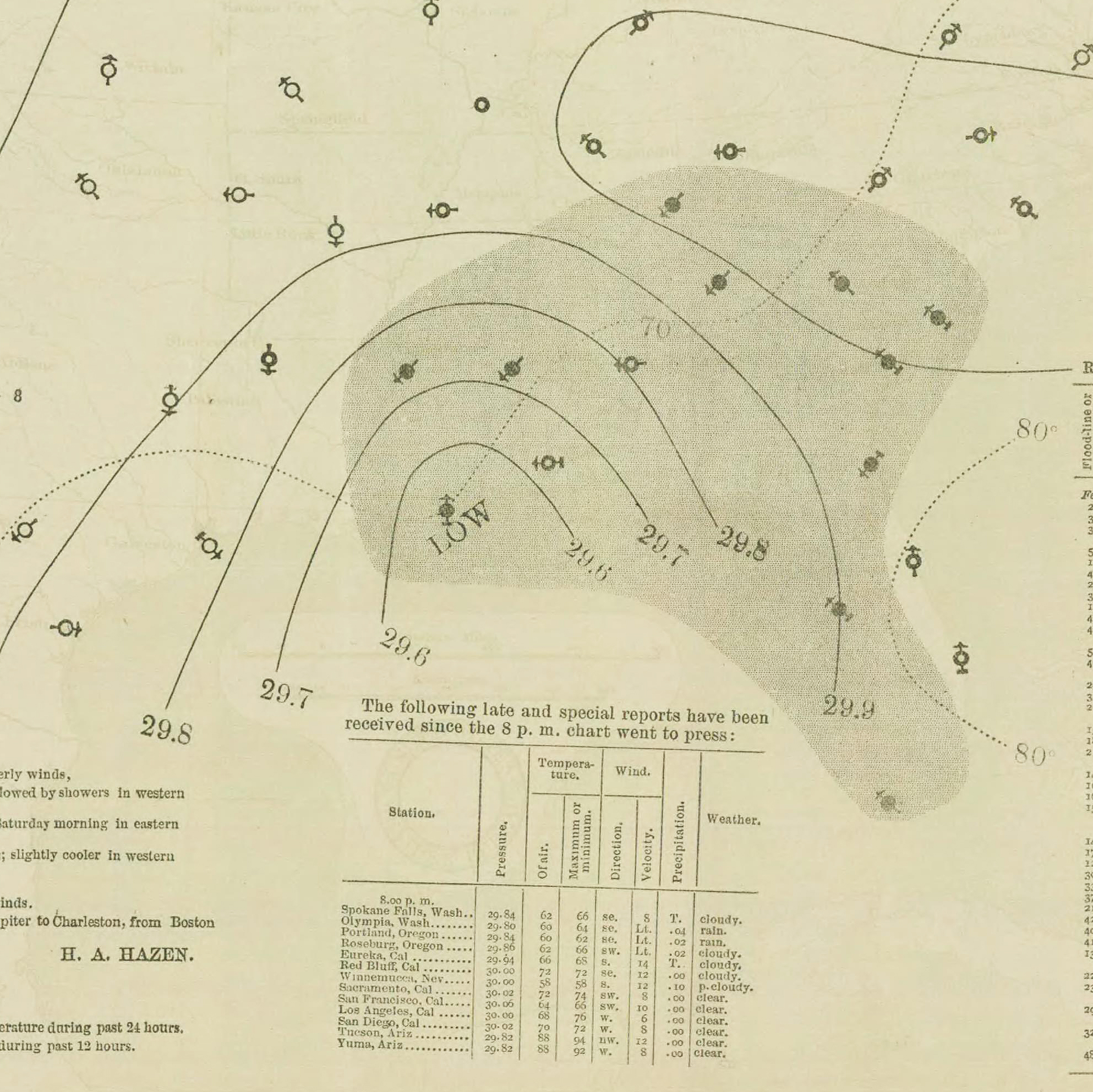
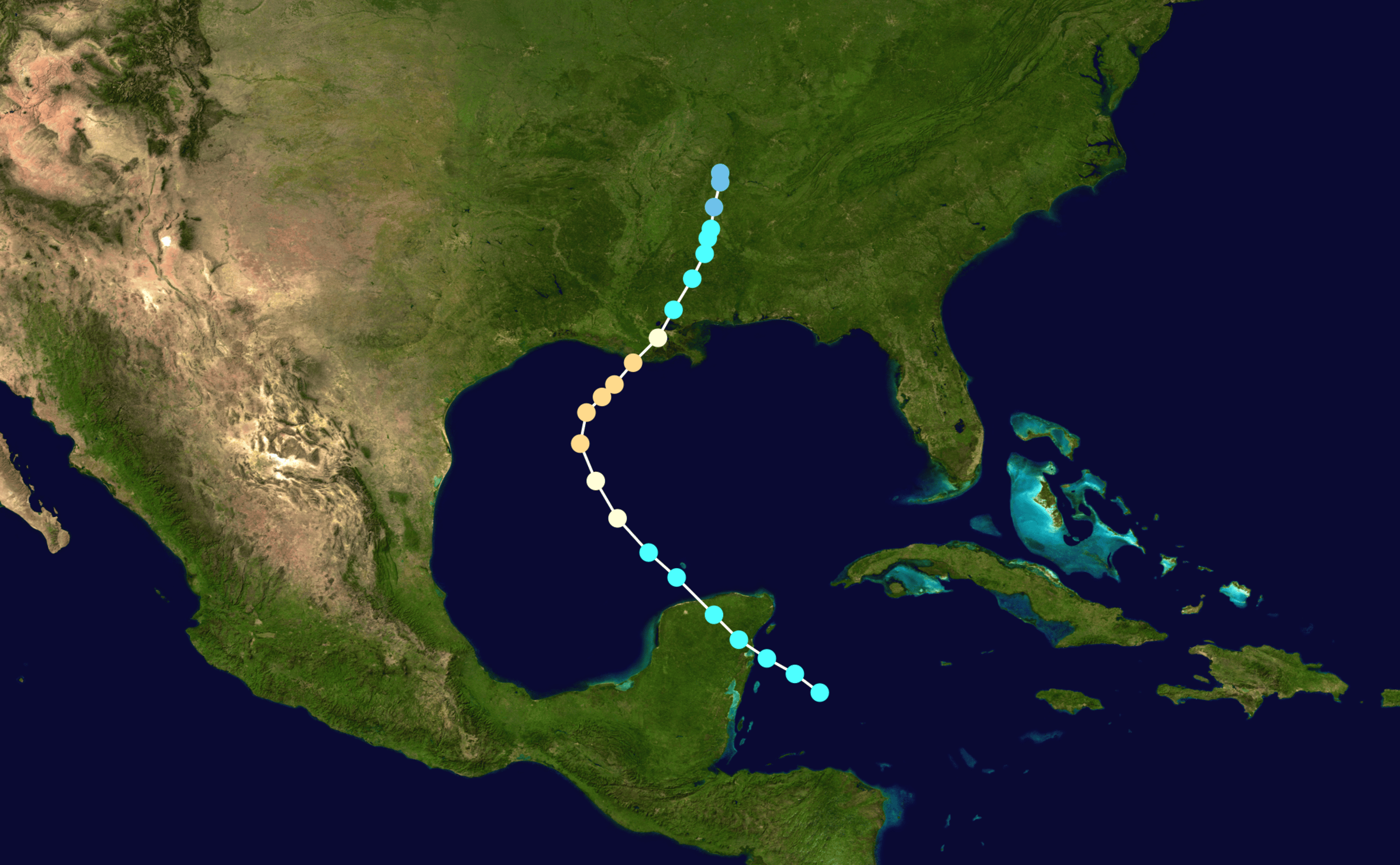
- Duration: September 4 – September 9
- Peak intensity: 100 mph (155 km/h) (1-min); 970 mbar (hPa)

The official Atlantic hurricane database begins the track for this cyclone on September 4 over the northwestern Caribbean, based on land observations around the Gulf Coast of the United States from the following day. Moving northwestward, the storm crossed the Yucatán Peninsula as a tropical storm but intensified into a hurricane over the Gulf of Mexico on September 6. Due to damage caused by the system, it is estimated to have strengthened into a Category 2 hurricane with winds of 100 mph (155 km/h) later that day while turning to the northeast. Around 14:00 UTC on September 7, the hurricane made landfall near Dulac, Louisiana, at the same intensity and with an estimated barometric pressure of 970 mbar (29 inHg). The system weakened to a tropical storm early the next day and then to a tropical depression over northern Mississippi early on September 9, several hours before dissipating over southwestern Tennessee.

Heavy rains fell over southern Louisiana, including a peak total of 15.2 in (390 mm) in Franklin, while Donaldsonville, Emilie, and Wallace broke 24-hour precipitation records for the month of September. Extensive losses to cotton, rice, and sugar occurred in St. Martin and St. Mary parishes, while East Feliciana Parish reported severe damage to oranges. In Lockport, a tornado killed five people, injured seventeen others, and inflicted about $40,000 in damage. The storm also dropped heavy rain in Mobile, Alabama, and Pensacola, Florida. Chenoweth's study developed this storm over the central Gulf of Mexico on September 4. The cyclone then moved slowly northeastward and then mostly followed the track across the Gulf Coast region of the United States as shown in HURDAT.

=== Hurricane Nine ===
- Category 3 hurricane (SSHWS)
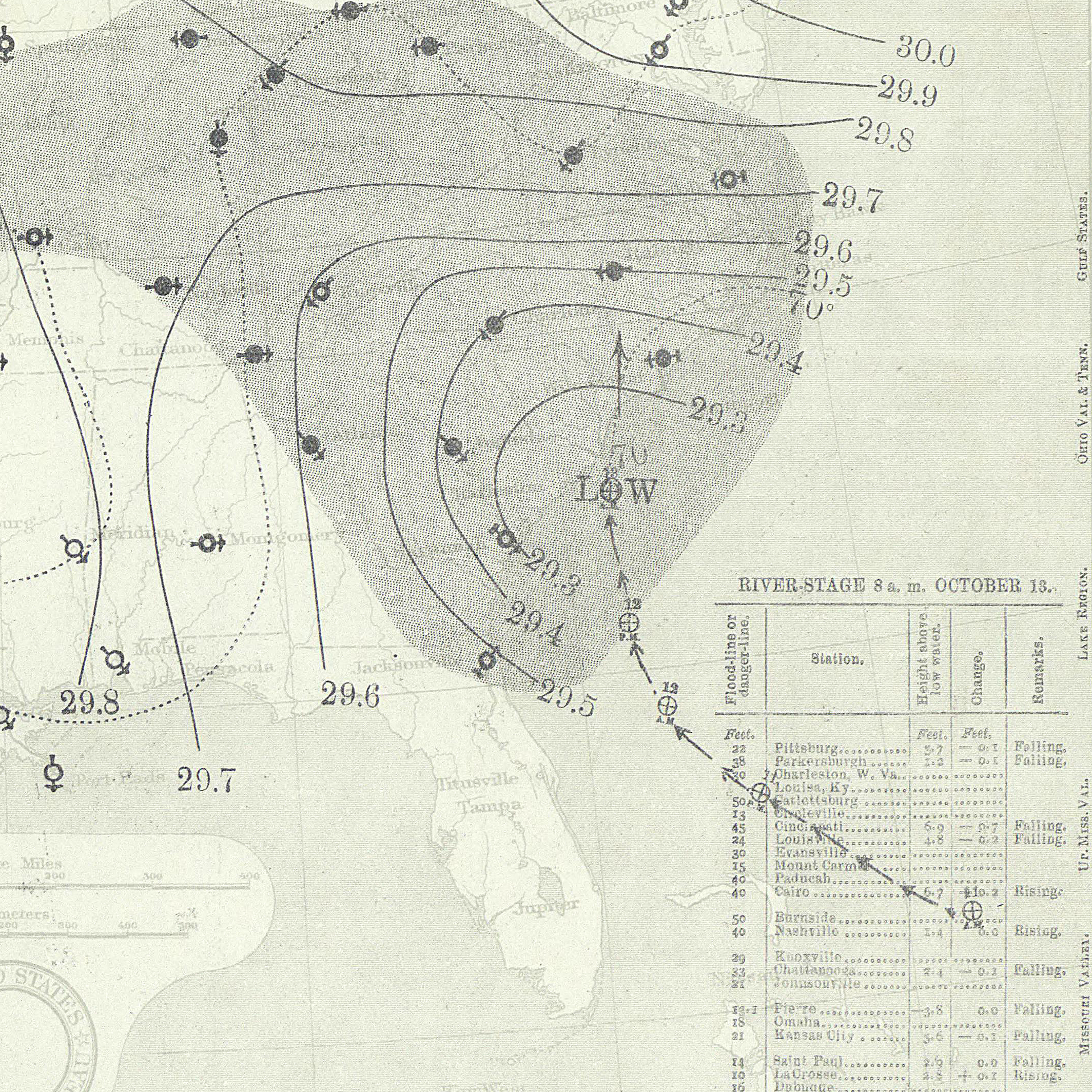
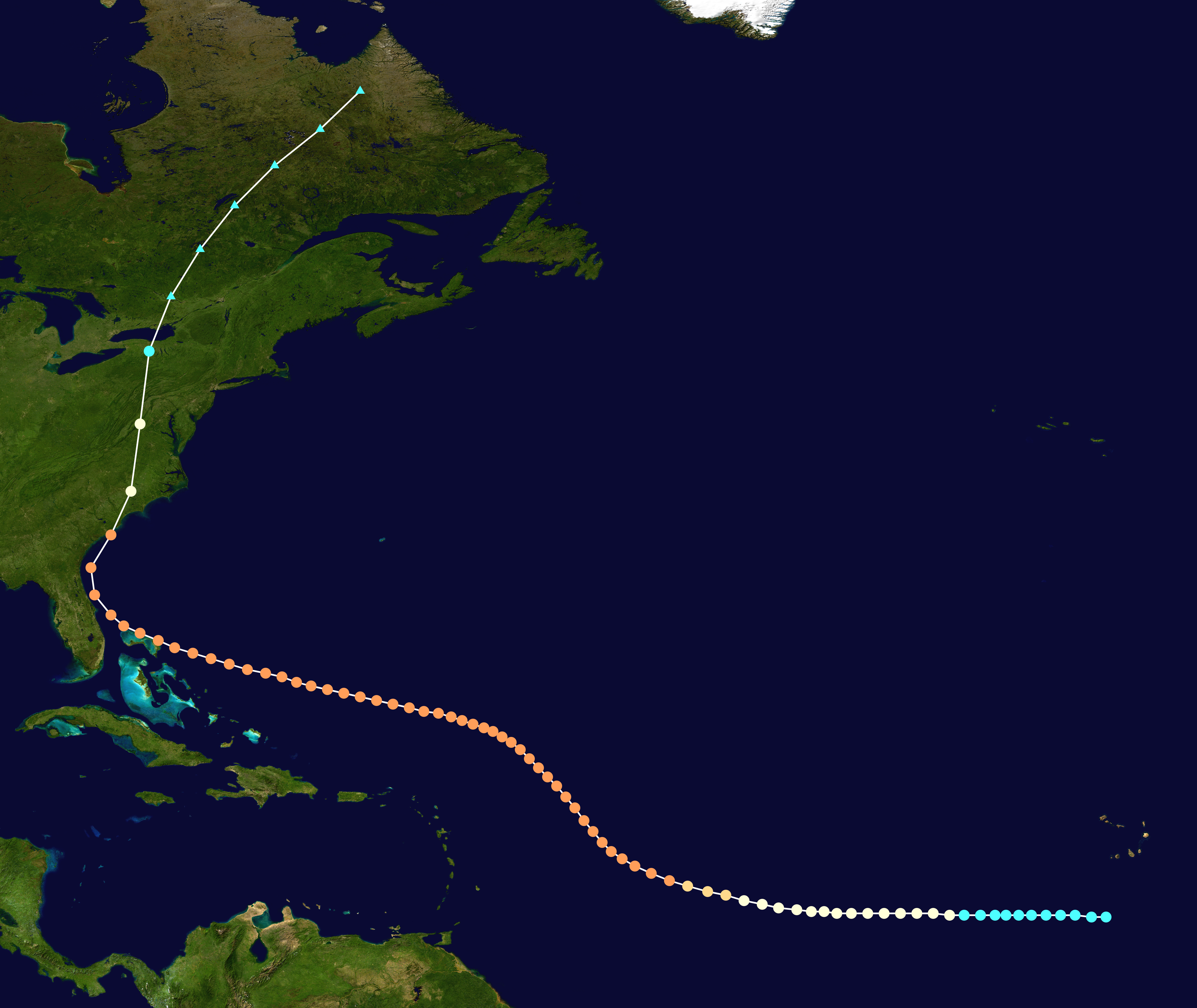
- Duration: September 25 – October 14
- Peak intensity: 120 mph (195 km/h) (1-min); 955 mbar (hPa)

The ninth known tropical cyclone of the season formed southwest of the Cape Verde Islands on September 25. It moved westward and intensified into a hurricane on September 28, before turning northwestward on October 2. By then, the system strengthened into a Category 3 hurricane and likely peaked with maximum sustained winds of 120 mph (195 km/h). The hurricane then moved west-northwestward for several days, beginning on October 6. After passing just north of the Abaco Islands on October 12, the storm curved northwestward and then north-northwestward, remaining closely offshore Florida and Georgia. The hurricane then turned northeastward and at around 13:00 UTC on October 13, it made landfall near McClellanville, South Carolina, winds of 120 mph (195 km/h) and a barometric pressure of 955 mbar (28.2 inHg). Moved rapidly northward through North Carolina and the Appalachian Mountains, the cyclone was still a Category 1 hurricane as it passed 60 mi (95 km) west of Washington, D.C. The storm transitioned into an extratropical cyclone over far southern Quebec on October 14 after crossing Lake Ontario and continued northeastward until dissipating over the northeastern portions of the province on the following day.

Chenoweth's study indicates that this system instead developed over the Cabo Verde Islands. From October 6 to October 13, the cyclone moved in a trajectory very similar that shown in HURDAT, but then the storm trekked slightly farther west across the United States and Canada.

Although the storm remained far away from the Lesser Antilles, Antigua reported sustained winds up to 27 mph (43 km/h). In the Bahamas, abnormally high tides inundated some streets on New Providence and nearby Hog Island (modern-day Paradise Island), sweeping away the home of the assistant lighthouse keeper. The storm severely damaged pineapple cultivation facilities on Eleuthera and plantations on the Abaco Islands, where many other buildings were destroyed. In Florida, storm surge reached several feet above ground between Palm Beach and Jacksonville, while heavy rains fell, leading to flooding in a number of coastal communities. Coastal flooding impacted South Carolina from Georgetown southward, though the worst occurred between Winyah Bay and Murrells Inlet. The National Hurricane Center lists the combined death toll for Florida and South Carolina at 28. North Carolina reported extensive damage to crops, trees, homes, and shipping, as well as 22 fatalities. Many towns across Virginia, the Mid-Atlantic, New England, and Ontario experienced wind damage and some coastal and freshwater flooding. In Maryland, the storm caused two indirect deaths due to a fire and about $1 million in damage in Baltimore alone. Inside the Great Lakes, the storm capsized nearly 40 vessels, leading to a loss of 54 lives. Four other people died in Buffalo, New York,

=== Hurricane Ten ===
- Category 4 hurricane (SSHWS)
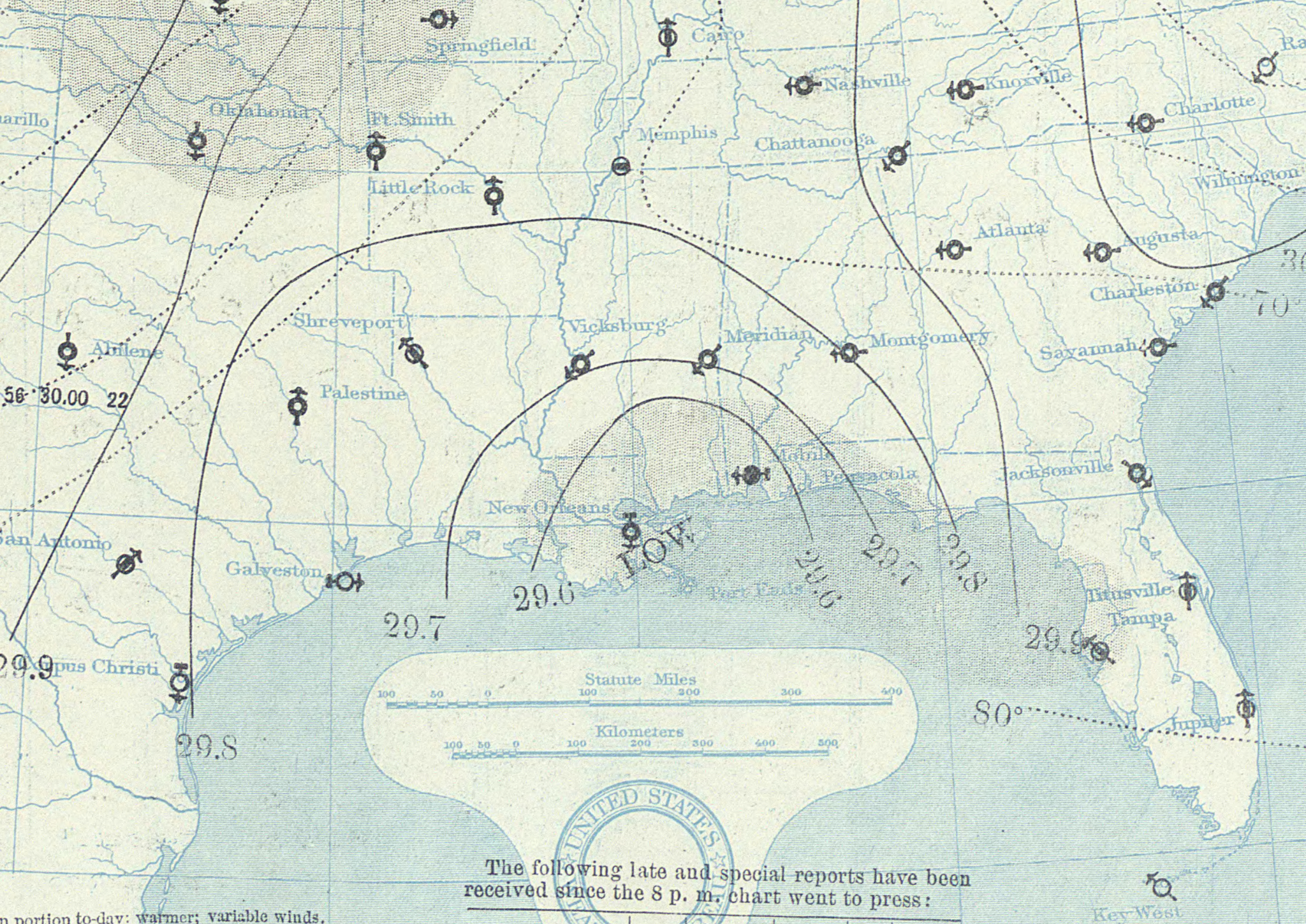
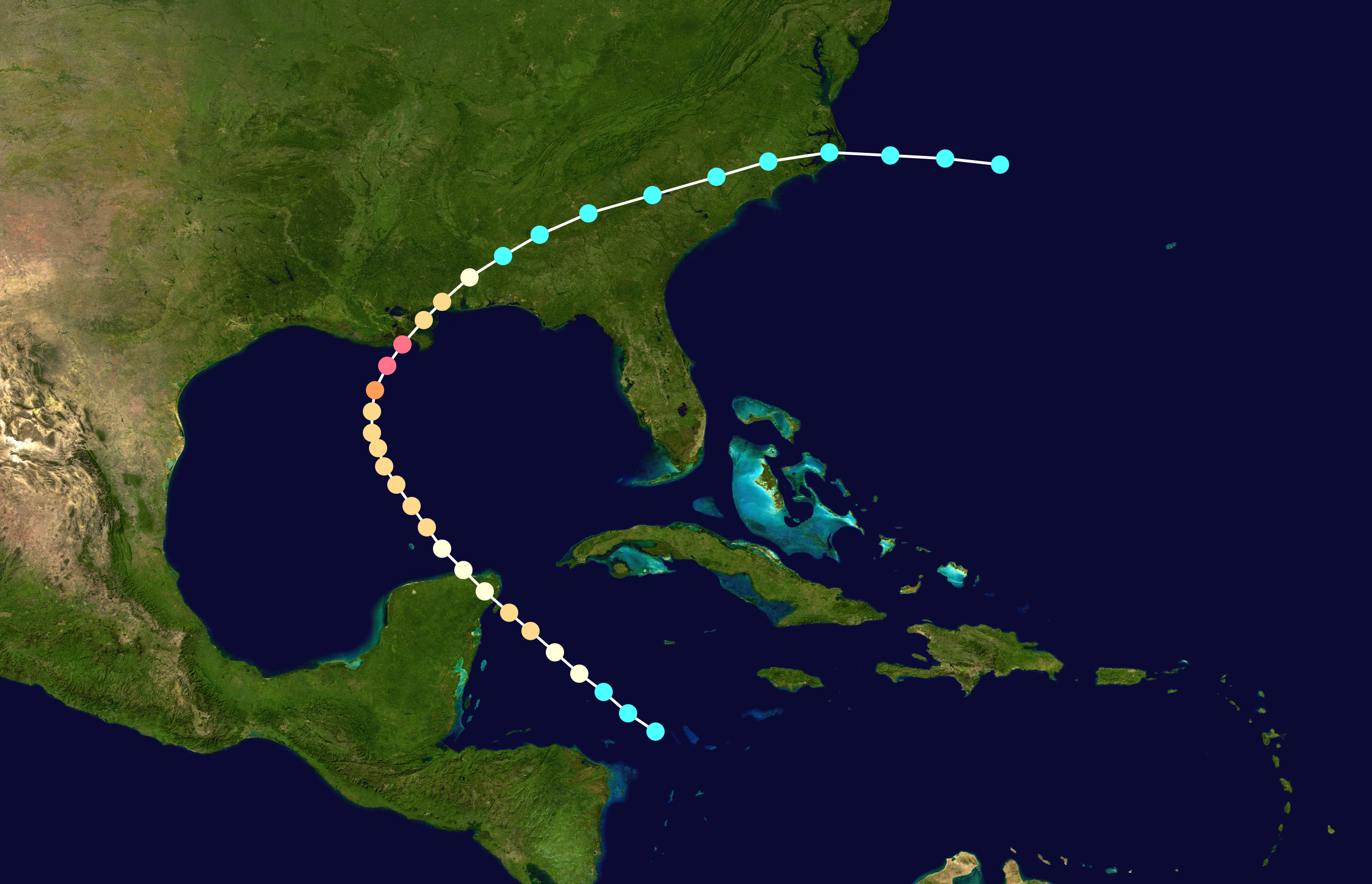
- Duration: September 27 – October 5
- Peak intensity: 130 mph (215 km/h) (1-min); 948 mbar (hPa)

Despite little information prior to October 1, the official track for this system begins on September 27 to the northeast of Honduras. The storm headed northwestward and intensified into a hurricane on the next day. Thereafter, the cyclone brushed Cozumel and then made landfall in Mexico's Yucatán Peninsula near Puerto Morelos as a Category 2 hurricane early on September 29. The storm continued northwestward until late on October 1, at which time a northeasterly motion commenced. While nearing the Gulf Coast of the United States, the system intensified significantly, peaking as a Category 4 hurricane with winds of 130 mph (215 km/h) and a minimum pressure of 948 mbar (28.0 inHg) at 06:00 UTC on October 2. Two hours later, the hurricane struck near Cheniere Caminada, Louisiana, at the same intensity and then another made landfall eight hours thereafter near Ocean Springs, Mississippi, as a strong Category 2 hurricane. The cyclone weakened to a tropical storm over Alabama early on October 3. Retaining tropical storm intensity while crossing the Southeastern United States, the storm emerged into the Atlantic from the Outer Banks of North Carolina on October 4 but likely dissipated on the following day. The 2014 study by Chenoweth proposed that this storm instead developed over the Gulf of Mexico, but then followed a path similar to that listed in HURDAT from October 2 onward.

Strong winds and storm surge left extensive effects in southeastern Louisiana, with towns between New Orleans and Port Eads suffering major damage, especially communities such as Cheniere Caminada and Grand Isle. Some bays along the south coast observed storm surge reaching 15 ft (4.6 m), while the Chandeleur Islands recorded a storm surge of 16 ft (4.9 m). The Thibodaux Sentinel noted that Cheniere Caminada had been "swept out of existence.", with few homes remaining standing and 779 residents being killed. At nearby Grand Isle, none of the summer homes and hotels survived the storm due to storm surge and tides inundating the area with water 9 ft (2.7 m) above ground. Extensive crop damage also occurred along both sides of the lower Mississippi River. The hurricane destroyed at least four churches across the state and caused about $5 million in damage to property alone. Approximately 2,000 deaths occurred as a result of the storm. In coastal Mississippi, storm surge washed hundreds of feet of a railroad bridge between Biloxi and Ocean Springs into several buildings. The storm also damaged a saw mill, a ship yard, several canning facilities, many wharves, bathhouses, and some homes. Abnormally high tides and storm surge in Alabama caused damage, especially in the Mobile area, with the commerce district submerged with 4 ft (1.2 m) of water. Seven deaths occurred in the state. In Florida, The New York Times noted that "on every street, uprooted trees, broken fences and roofless buildings testify of the storm's force" in Pensacola. Storm surge caused washouts that disrupted rail service and shipping. Several other places in the Southeastern United States reported heavy rainfall, while high tides in North Carolina and Virginia capsized a few ships and drowned two people in the former.

=== Tropical Storm Eleven ===
- Tropical storm (SSHWS)
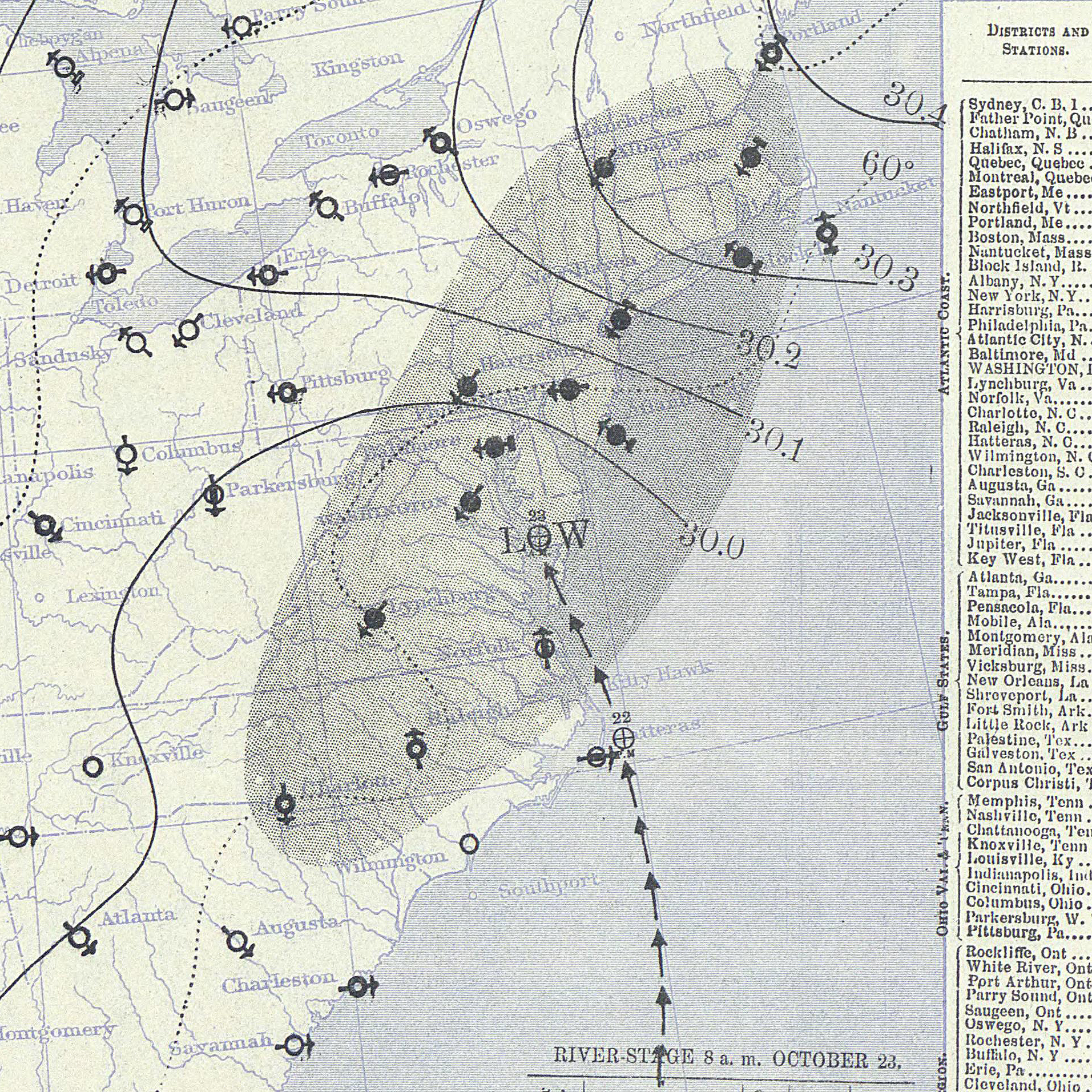
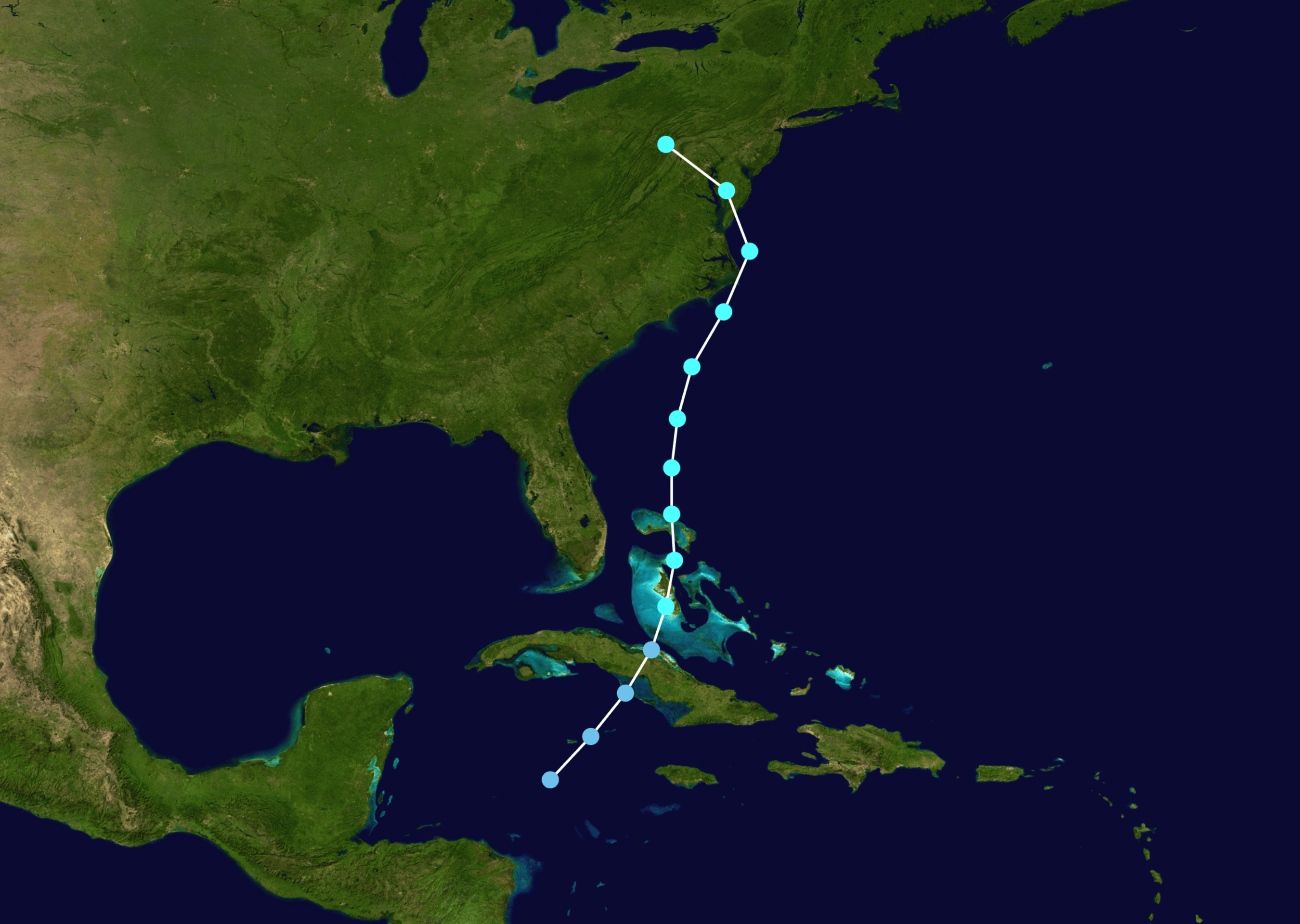
- Duration: October 20 – October 23
- Peak intensity: 60 mph (95 km/h) (1-min);

A tropical depression likely developed over the northwestern Caribbean on October 20. However, some reassessments of the storm show movement over Florida and others over Cuba. The official track of the cyclone elects for a landfall in the Cuban province of Ciego de Ávila near the municipality of Venezuela. After crossing the island, the cyclone emerged into the Atlantic and intensified into a tropical storm shortly before striking Andros in the Bahamas on October 21. Moving generally northward, the storm passed over the Abaco Islands or Grand Bahama later that day. Sustained winds increased to 60 mph (95 km/h) on October 22 as the system began curving northeastward. Around 03:00 UTC the next day, the cyclone made landfall near Cape Hatteras, North Carolina. A turn to the northwest after crossing the Outer Banks caused the storm to make another landfall around 11:00 UTC on October 23 near Chincoteague, Virginia. The system was last noted over Pennsylvania several hours later.

In the Bahamas, Nassau and the surrounding area reported heavy rainfall on October 21 and October 22, including 7.17 in (182 mm) of precipitation on the latter, the largest accumulation in a 24-hour period there since 1879. In low-lying parts of eastern Nassau and Grants Town, water up to several inches deep surrounded homes. The storm caused gales and heavy precipitation from Hatteras, North Carolina, to Sandy Hook, New Jersey. In North Carolina, Kitty Hawk observed sustained winds of 54 mph (87 km/h). Western Union reported that 25 of their communication wires were downed between Washington, D.C. and New York City. Chenoweth proposed removing the cyclone from HURDAT, noting that it was "most likely an extratropical system".

=== Tropical Storm Twelve ===
- Tropical storm (SSHWS)
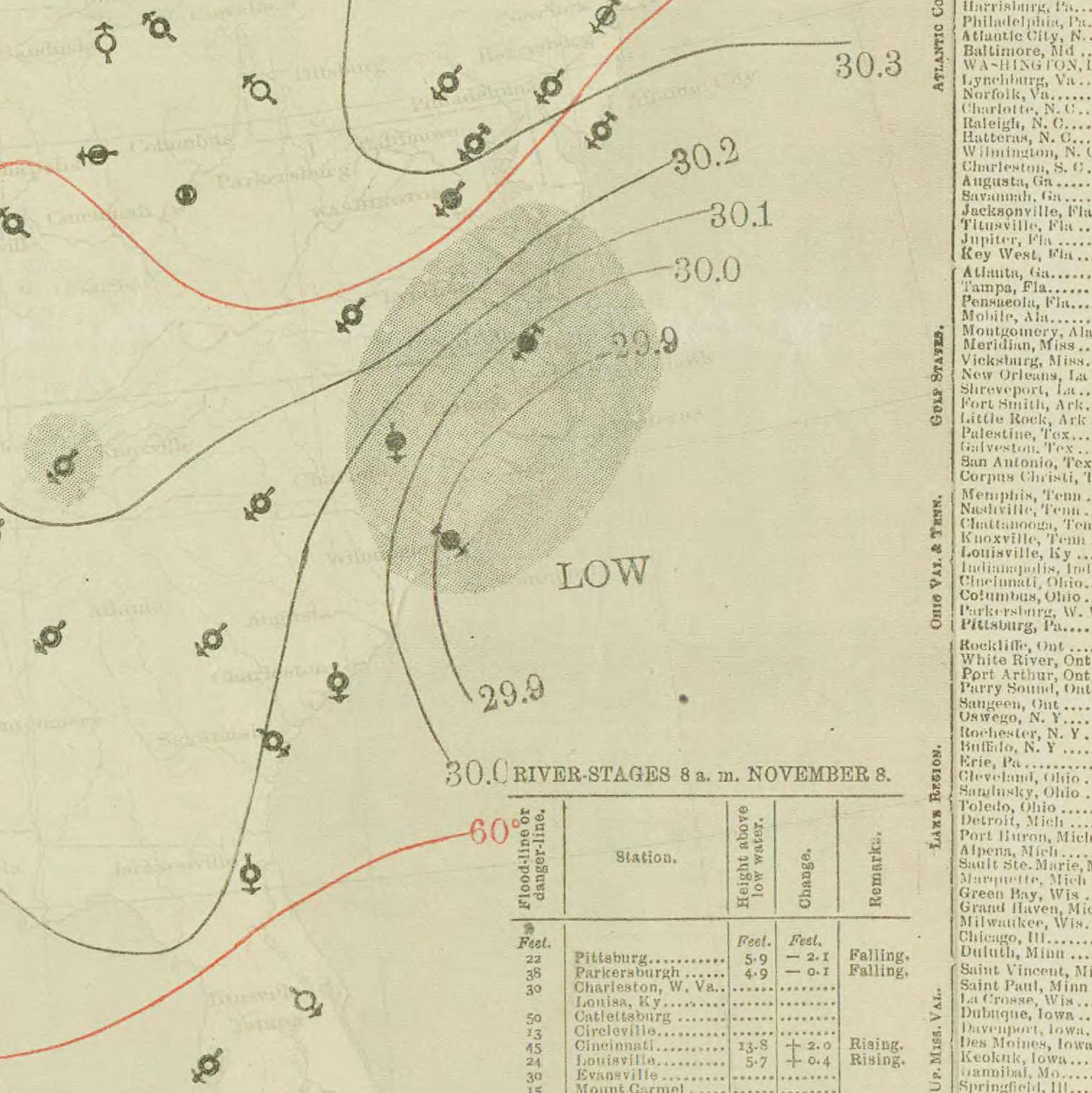
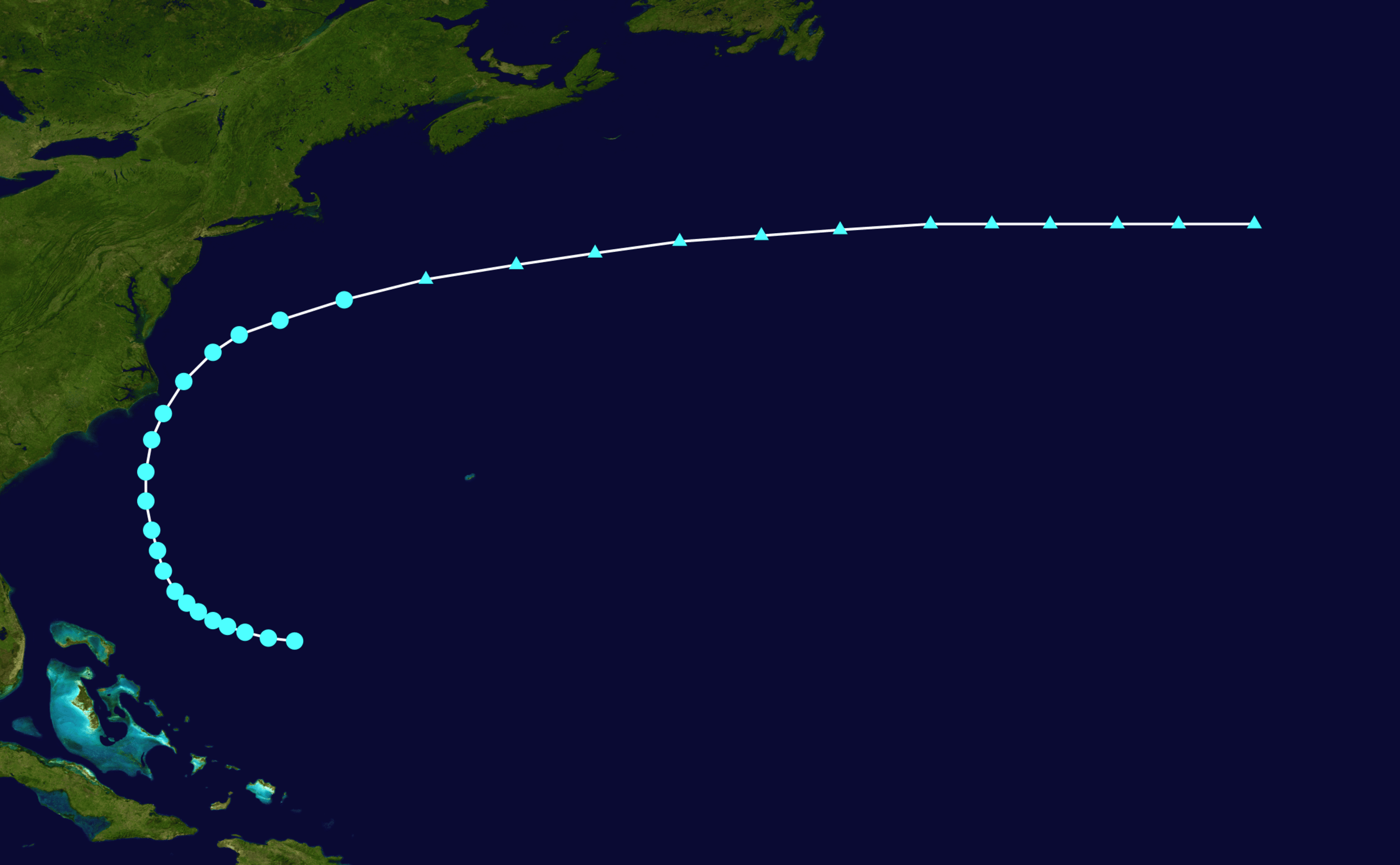
- Duration: November 5 – November 9
- Peak intensity: 70 mph (110 km/h) (1-min);

A low-pressure area became a tropical storm on November 5, situated about 385 mi (620 km) east of Marsh Harbour in the Bahamas, though Partagás noted the possibility of the system having subtropical characteristics. The storm gradually turned west-northward and then northward. On November 8, the cyclone passed within 50 mi (80 km) of the Outer Banks of North Carolina with winds of 70 mph (110 km/h) but curved northeastward and remained offshore. The system then shifted east-northeastward on November 9 and transitioned into an extratropical storm that day. The extratropical remnants dissipated near the Azores on November 12.

In North Carolina, the town of Kitty Hawk observed sustained winds of 58 mph (93 km/h). Offshore the Mid-Atlantic and New England, 14 coal barges encountered rough seas generated by the storm, several of which later sank. An unidentified steamship near the Delaware Breakwater also became disabled but was towed to safety by the bark Clan Ferguson. The 2014 study by Chenoweth suggested the removal this system from HURDAT, noting "Daily weather maps indicate that this is most likely an extratropical system".

=== Other storms ===
In addition to the twelve tropical cyclones, Chenoweth proposed four other storms not currently listed in HURDAT. The first of the four reportedly developed over the northeastern Atlantic on August 22. Moving northeastward, the system passed between Flores Island and Faial Island in the Azores before becoming extratropical during the following day. Chenoweth's second unofficial cyclone formed on August 25. south of the Cabo Verde Islands. After moving generally northwestward for several days, the storm turned northward on August 31 and then eastward on September 2. Two days later, Chenoweth ended the track over the central Atlantic. On September 5, Chenoweth's third proposed cyclone developed over the central Atlantic. After meandering erratically for nearly a week, the storm began a rapid northeastward trajectory in which it continued until becoming extratropical just west of the Azores on September 15. The final unofficial system proposed by Chenoweth formed on that day well east of Bermuda. Moving north-northeastward, the storm transitioned into an extratropical cyclone by September 17.

== Season effects ==
This is a table of all of the known storms that have formed in the 1893 Atlantic hurricane season. It includes their duration, landfall, damages, and death totals. Deaths in parentheses are additional and indirect (an example of an indirect death would be a traffic accident), but were still related to that storm. Damage and deaths include totals while the storm was extratropical, a wave, or a low, and all of the damage figures are in 1893 USD.

Saffir–Simpson scale
| TD | TS | C1 | C2 | C3 | C4 | C5 |

1893 North Atlantic tropical cyclone season statistics
| Storm name | Dates active | Storm category at peak intensity | Max 1-min wind mph (km/h) | Min. press. (mbar) | Areas affected | Damage (US$) | Deaths | Ref(s). |
|---|---|---|---|---|---|---|---|---|
| One | June 12–19 | Category 1 hurricane | 80 (130) | 999 | Southeastern United States (Florida) | Unknown | None | |
| Two | July 4–7 | Category 2 hurricane | 100 (155) | Unknown | Central America (Nicaragua), Yucatán Peninsula (Belize) | Unknown | Unknown | |
| Three | August 13–22 | Category 3 hurricane | 120 (195) | <988 | Lesser Antilles (Puerto Rico), Turks and Caicos Islands, Bahamas, East Coast of the United States, Atlantic Canada | Unknown | 37 | |
| Four | August 15–24 | Category 3 hurricane | 115 (185) | 952 | East Coast of the United States (New York), Eastern Canada | Unknown | 34 | |
| Five | August 15–19 | Category 2 hurricane | 100 (155) | Unknown | Atlantic Canada (Newfoundland) | Unknown | None | |
| Six | August 15–30 | Category 3 hurricane | 120 (195) | 954 | Bahamas, East Coast of the United States (South Carolina), Georgia, Atlantic Canada | >$1 million | >1,000 | |
| Seven | August 20–29 | Category 2 hurricane | 100 (155) | Unknown | Azores | Unknown | 5 | |
| Eight | September 4–9 | Category 2 hurricane | 100 (155) | 970 | Yucatán Peninsula (Quintana Roo), Gulf Coast of the United States (Louisiana) | >$40,000 | 5 | |
| Nine | September 25 – October 14 | Category 3 hurricane | 120 (195) | 955 | Bahamas, East Coast of the United States (South Carolina), Eastern Canada | >$1 million | 110 | |
| Ten | September 27 – October 5 | Category 4 hurricane | 130 (215) | 948 | Yucatán Peninsula (Quintana Roo), Gulf Coast of the United States (Louisiana), Southeastern United States | $5 million | 2,000 | |
| Eleven | October 20–23 | Tropical storm | 60 (95) | Unknown | Cuba, Bahamas, East Coast of the United States (Virginia) | Unknown | None | |
| Twelve | November 5–9 | Tropical storm | 70 (110) | Unknown | East Coast of the United States | Unknown | None | |
Season aggregates
| 12 systems | June 12 – November 9 | | 130 (215) | 948 | | >$7.04 million | >3,191 | |

== See also ==
- Atlantic hurricane reanalysis project
- Tropical cyclone observation
