= Gabarus =

Community in Nova Scotia, Canada

Coordinates: 45°50′14″N 60°8′15″W

Gabarus in Nova Scotia

Gabarus is a community in the Canadian province of Nova Scotia, located in the Cape Breton Regional Municipality. It was an important fisheries centre with a cannery until the mid-20th century. Today, it is sustained by tourism and small-scale commercial fishing, including lobster.

There is a sign: Established 1716 at the edge of the village.
