= Orleans Parish Criminal Courts Building =

- U.S. National Register of Historic Places
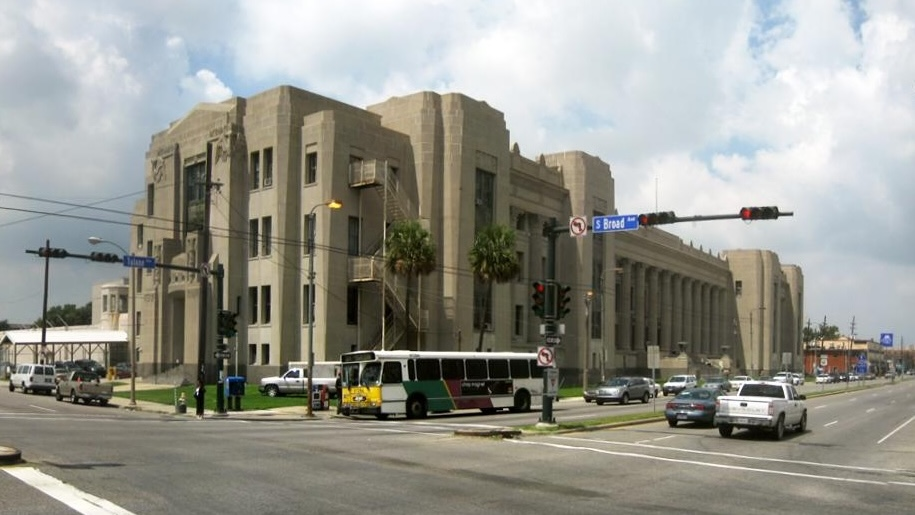
- The courthouse in 2008

- Location within Louisiana Location within the United States
- Interactive map showing the location of Orleans Parish Criminal Courts Building
- Location: 2700 Tulane Avenue
- Coordinates: 29.9615°N 90.092°W
- Built: 1929
- Website: https://www.criminalcourt.org/
- NRHP reference No.: 84001337
- Added to NRHP: January 12, 1984

The Orleans Parish Criminal Courts Building, formally the Israel M. Augustine Jr. Criminal Justice Center, is a courthouse in the Mid-City neighborhood of New Orleans, Louisiana, United States. It was constructed in 1929 and is known for its unusual combination of neoclassical and Art Deco architecture. It replaced an 1893 brick courthouse at Elk Place built in Romanesque and Gothic styles.

== Architecture ==
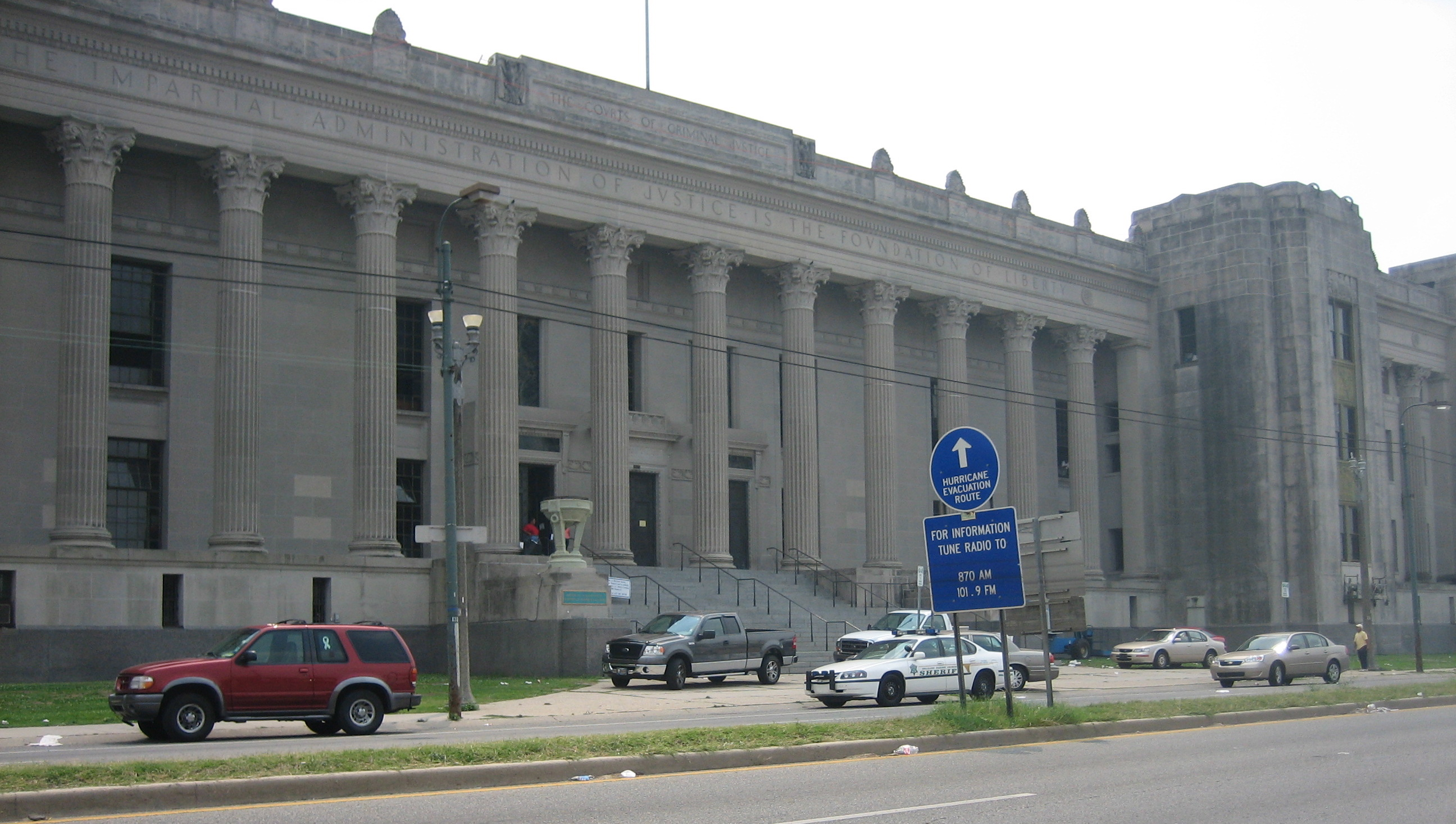
The neoclassical center section of the courthouse in 2006

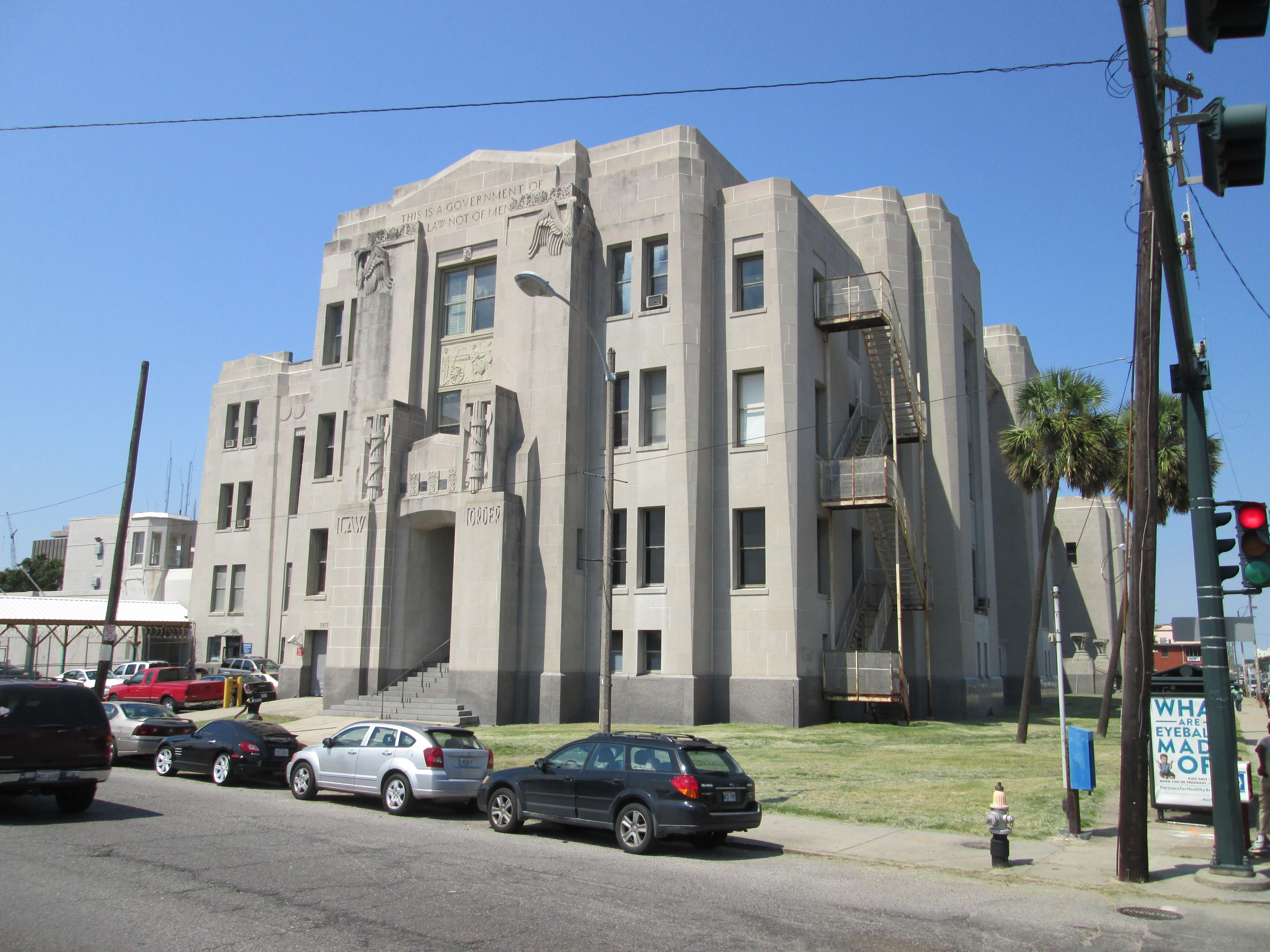
End pavilion of the courthouse in 2013, showing Art Deco features

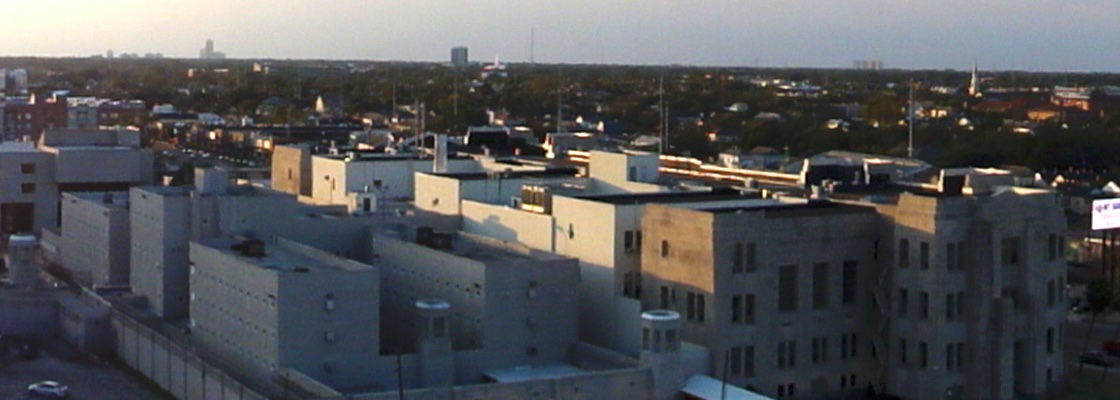
Rear of the building showing the original prison facilities in 2012

The architect was Allison Owen, and it was built by R. P. Farnsworth & Co. The building is overall in a stripped neoclassical style, and is unusual in incorporating a mix of Beaux-Arts and Art Deco portions: the central section features a colonnade of twelve fluted Corinthian columns, while the end pavilions are in a contrasting Egyptian-inspired Art Deco style. The architect intended the contrasting styles as representing the elegance and severity of the law. The building is also unusual in that there are few examples of severe neoclassical architecture from the early 20th century in Louisiana, with the colonnade believed to be the longest of its style in the state.

The building also features sculpted decorations by Angela Gregory, including bronzed cast-iron bas reliefs featuring scenes from local history, including French trappers approaching a Native-American chief, armed colonial soldiers standing in front of an ornate gate, and an African soldier loading a cannon; as well as pelicans, the state symbol of Louisiana.

The building is three stories, with a footprint 418 feet (127 m) by 70 feet (21 m). It is faced in limestone and has three monumental bronze entrance doors. The interior contains a two-story barrel-vaulted lobby providing access to the courtrooms that occupies nearly the full width of the building, which feature several large Art Deco glass chandeliers. According to the architect, the lobby was meant to recall the salle des pas perdus of the Palais de Justice in Paris. The interior entrance to the center courtroom features a mural by Ellsworth Woodward.

== History ==
=== Early courthouses ===
Predecessors to the Criminal Court were located in the Presbytere. The Superior Criminal Court was created in 1874, and was located at the Bank of Louisiana Building from then until 1879, when it moved to St. Patrick's Hall. (St. Patrick's Hall was on the site of the present John Minor Wisdom U.S. Court of Appeals Building.)

=== Elk Place courthouse ===
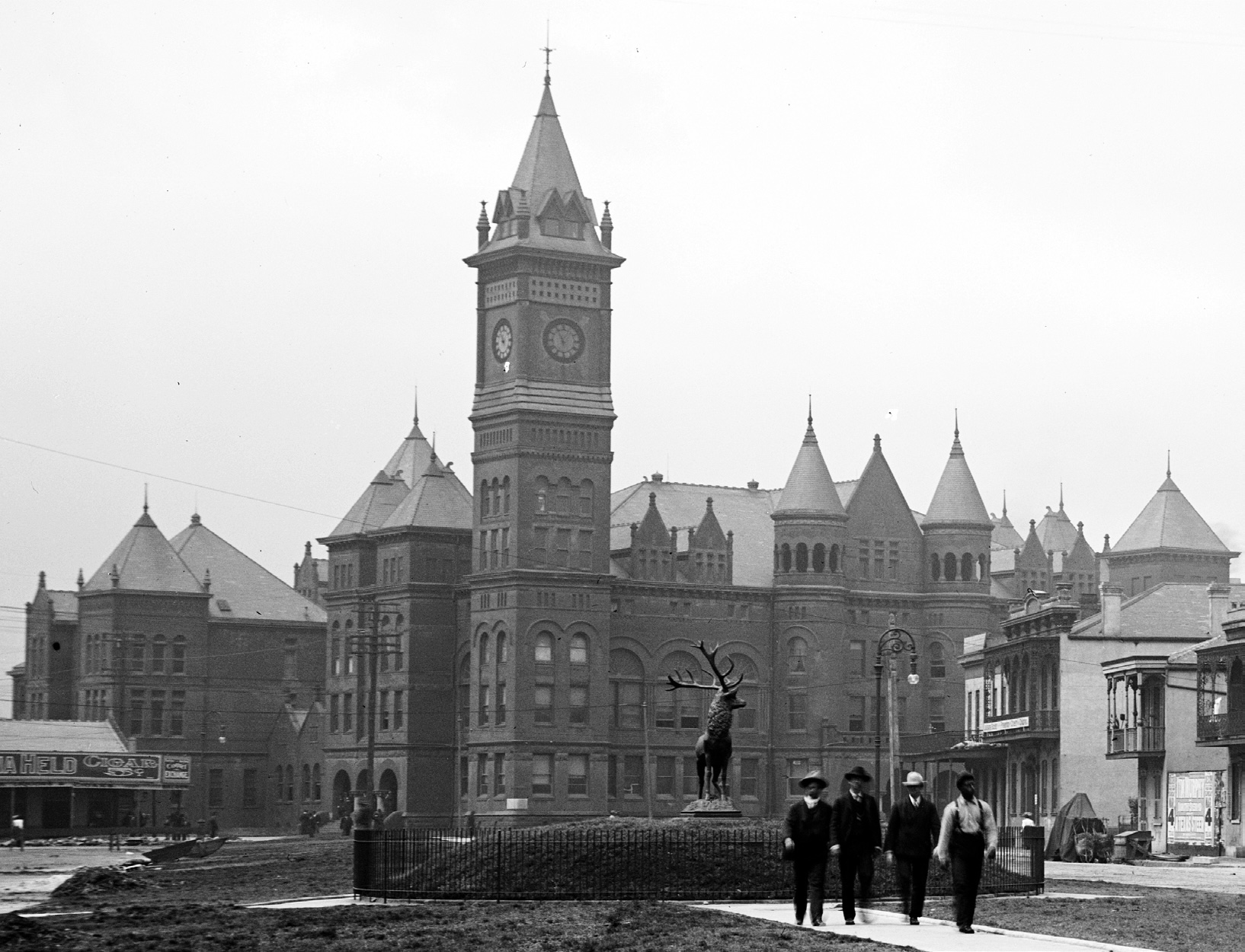
The Elk Place courthouse around 1906

A new Criminal Courts Building and Parish Prison, a grand Romanesque and Gothic brick building, opened at Elk Place in 1893. Shortly after the building was completed, half the City Council members were indicted for bribery and graft in the construction of the building, which turned out to have been poorly constructed with cracks appearing in the building.

The city's expansion eventually made this courthouse inadequate, and the courts moved to the current courthouse in 1931. Due to deterioration, the Elk Place courthouse's tower was removed in 1940, and the rest of the building was demolished during 1949–1950. The current Main Branch of the New Orleans Public Library now stands on the site.

=== Current courthouse ===
The site of the current courthouse was originally occupied by the second New Orleans U.S. Marine Hospital, which was constructed from 1856 to 1860 but never completed due to the structure sinking into the swampy land. The building nevertheless saw various uses over the following decades including a Civil War military hospital and a boys' house of refuge. That building was demolished after 1896 and replaced in 1901 with the third Orleans Parish Prison. The prison was itself demolished and replaced with the current courthouse in 1929.

The courthouse in 1969 hosted the trial of Clay Shaw, who was acquitted of charges connected to the assassination of John F. Kennedy. The prison behind the courthouse moved its operations to the Orleans Parish House of Detention across the street in the late 1970s. The building was renamed the Israel M. Augustine Jr. Criminal Justice Center in 1996, after the court's first African-American judge. A replica of part of the building's interior was featured in the 2020–2023 TV series Your Honor.
