= Allison Owen =

American architect and military leader from New Orleans (1869–1951)

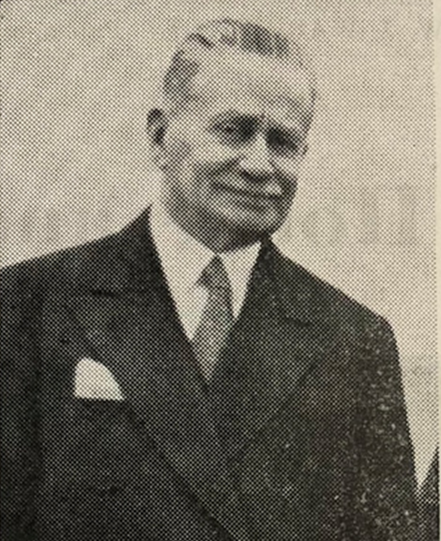
- Major-General Allison Owen, c. 1937
- Born: 29 December 1869; New Orleans, Louisiana
- Died: 30 January 1951 (aged 81); Hôtel-Dieu, New Orleans
- Resting place: Metairie Cemetery, New Orleans
- Citizenship: American
- Education: Tulane University, New Orleans
- Occupations: Architect, soldier, civic leader
- Notable work: New Orleans Public Library, Lee Circle; Notre Dame Seminary, Carrollton; Criminal Court building, Tulane

Major-General Allison Owen (December 29, 1869 – January 30, 1951) was an American architect, military officer and civic leader. He served as commander of the Washington Artillery during World War I and later led the 56th Field Artillery Brigade. A prominent New Orleans architect, Owen designed several notable civic and religious buildings.

== Early life and education ==
Allison Owen was born on December 29, 1869, in New Orleans, Louisiana. His father, William Miller Owen, served as adjutant of the Washington Artillery during the American Civil War and later commanded the unit in the Louisiana National Guard.

Owen attended St. Simeon's and Jackson schools in New Orleans. He then went to Tulane University, where he studied, and later taught, art and architectural drawing during the period when Ellsworth Woodward directed art instruction at Tulane. Owen then studied architecture for 2 years at the Massachusetts Institute of Technology.

== Military career ==
Owen's military service spanned more than four decades. He first joined the Washington Artillery Battalion in 1890, during a period of reorganization following the American Civil War and Spanish–American War. By 1916, Major Owen commanded the battalion during its federal mobilization on the Mexican border at Donna, Texas.

When the United States entered World War I, the Washington Artillery was redesignated the 141st Field Artillery Regiment, part of the 39th Division, where Colonel Owen led it to France. The main body of the 141st returned to New Orleans in April 1919 to a formal demobilization and civic welcome.

After the war, Owen was promoted to brigadier general and placed in command of the newly created 56th Field Artillery Brigade of the Louisiana National Guard, which included units from Louisiana, Mississippi, Alabama, and Florida. He held that command until his retirement in December 1933 upon reaching the statutory age limit.

Owen's military service earned several distinctions from the Louisiana National Guard and other states, as well as recognition, via the award of Chevalier in the Legion of Honour, from the French government for his work during and after the war.

== Architectural career ==
After teaching drawing at Tulane University, Owen partnered with Collins C. Diboll in 1895 to form the firm Diboll & Owen, active in New Orleans in the early twentieth century.

Among the firm's major commissions were the New Orleans Criminal Courts Building (1929), the Notre Dame Seminary complex, the New Orleans Athletic Club, and the former main branch of the New Orleans Public Library at Lee Circle (demolished in the 1950s).

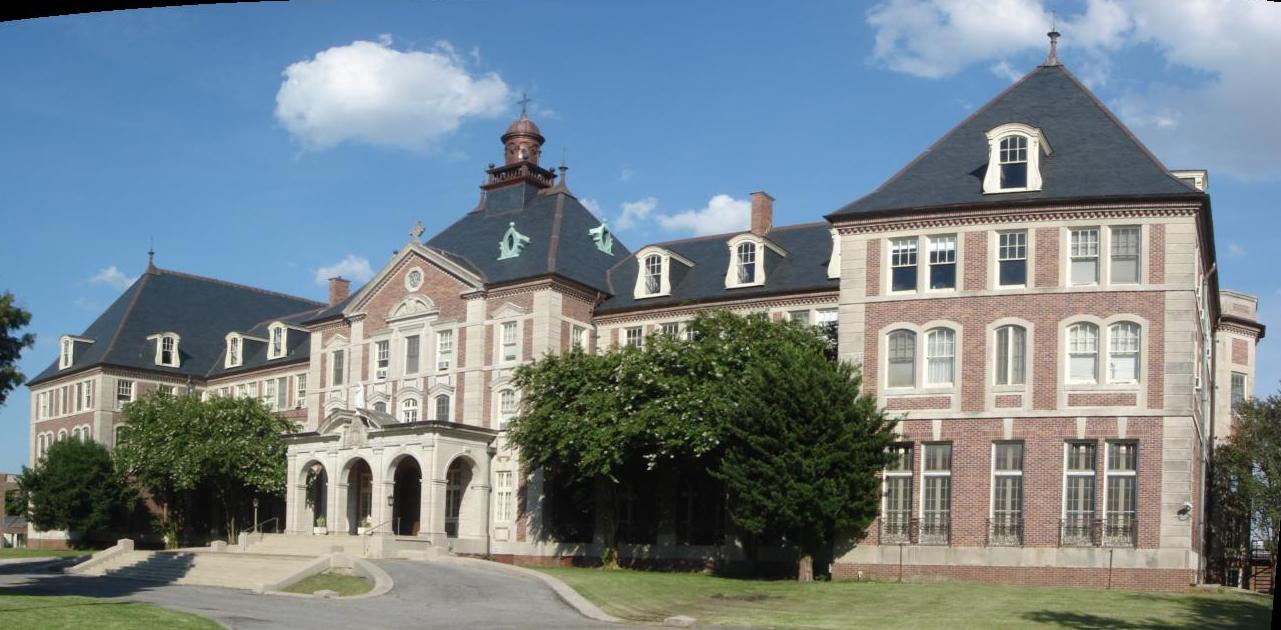
The Notre Dame Seminary in New Orleans, designed by Owen.

He was past president of both the Louisiana Architectural Association (LAA) and the Louisiana chapter of the American Institute of Architecture (AIA). He was a fellow of the AIA. Between July 1905 and at least January 1913, Allison edited the LAA's monthly magazine, Architecture and Allied Arts, which from July 1906 was renamed as Architectural Art and Its Allies.

== Notable works ==
Among Owen's major architectural designs are:

- Notre Dame Seminary (New Orleans, 1923)
- New Orleans Public Library (Lee Circle, 1908; demolished in the late 1950s)
- Criminal Courts Building, 2700 Tulane Avenue (1929)
- Owen–Lassus House, 1237 State Street (1902, his own residence)
- Pythian Temple (1909, commissioned by the Knights of Pythias)
- New Orleans Athletic Club
- St. Henry's Catholic Church, General Pershing Street
- Emlah Court Building, 3823 St. Charles Avenue (1912)
- United Fruit Company building, Union Street, whose façade is adorned with fruit
- American Sugar Refining offices
- Municipal Office building
- Canal Louisiana Bank building, Royal Street, now a hotel (1906)
- Metropolitan Bank building, Camp Street, corner with Poydras Street
- Westminster Congregational Church, Kansas City (1907)
- Saint Joseph's Roman Catholic Church, Mobile, Alabama (1907)
- Presbyterian Church, Yazoo City

New Orleans' Historic District Landmarks Commission designation report on Owen's own home, Owen–Lassus House, 1237 State Street in Audubon, noted that he had designed a house in a similar form to that represented by the portico front residences in Natchez, Mississippi, representing the 18th and early 19th-century American colonial style. Though Owen did not directly replicate a specific Natchez house, there are some similarities with the Greek-Revival Antebellum building Rosalie Mansion, in downtown Natchez. Owen spent $5,300 buying two plots in 1902-1903 (equivalent in 2025 to approximately $200,000) to construct the house, which has five bays and a large fluted Ionic order portico.

One of New Orleans' more distinctive buildings is the Memorial Hall, on Camp Street by Howard Avenue, now home to the Confederate Memorial Hall Museum. This Romanesque building was designed by Thomas O. Sully and Albert Toledano, it was completed towards the end of 1890 and dedicated in January 1891. In the archives of Tulane University there are a pair of watercolours, featuring the elevation of the Memorial Hall. Signed by Allison Owen in 1889, then around 20 years old and an instructor of mechanical and freehand drawing at Tulane, it appeared to be the starting point used by Sully and Toledano in their final design.

== Civic involvement ==
Outside of his military and architectural careers, Owen was an active civic leader in New Orleans. He served as president of the city's Association of Commerce during the 1927 Mississippi River flood, when business and civic groups worked to reassure residents about the city's safety. He later testified before Congress on national flood-control legislation, emphasizing the importance of federal investment in levees and spillways.

Owen also led humanitarian efforts as chairman of the New Orleans chapter of the American Red Cross, coordinating relief and fundraising after the 1927 flood and remaining active during World War II.

An advocate for historic preservation, Owen supported early efforts to safeguard the French Quarter, reflecting the influence of his former teacher William Woodward, one of the first New Orleans artists to promote the city's architectural heritage. In 1943, Pope Pius XII invested Owen as a knight of the Order of St. Gregory the Great for his service to the Church and the Society of St. Vincent de Paul.

== Personal life and death ==
He married Blanche Pothier in 1895. They had four children, where a son (Allison Owen Jr.) and daughter (Cecile Owen) survived their father's death. He died in the early hours of January 30, 1951 at Hôtel-Dieu hospital (now known as University Hospital, New Orleans), at the age of 81 years, having suffered a stroke.

== Legacy ==
Modern scholarship has also placed Owen within the broader context of early twentieth-century Confederate memorialization in New Orleans. As a member of the City Planning Commission, he supported renaming streets and erecting monuments that reflected Confederate memory.

Many of Owen's architectural works stand to this day. However, much of his civic vision for a greener and more beautiful city was later undone. As chairman of the Parkway and Park Commission, he had overseen the planting of tens of thousands of trees and the creation of New Orleans’ azalea trail and palm-lined boulevards. But these landscapes were permanently scarred by the construction of the Pontchartrain Expressway (Interstate 10) in the 1960s after his death, which cut through South Claiborne Avenue, destroyed over 200 oak trees, and displaced hundreds of homes and businesses that had been central to the avenue's character.

Owen's portrait by William Woodward was included in the Louisiana State Museum’s For Home and Country exhibit from 2017 to 2018.

The papers of Allison Owen are held by the Tulane University in their Special Collections Repository, donated by his daughter Cecile Owen. The New Orleans City Archives & Special Collections holds other records, notably some of his architectural designs as well as back issues of Architectural Art and Its Allies. Louisiana State University, in Baton Rouge, holds his father's records and some of Allison Owen's military archives in the Hill Memorial Library Special Collections.
