= United States Marine Hospital (New Orleans) =

Set of former hospitals in New Orleans

Locations of the three Marine Hospital sites in New Orleans

Three sites were constructed to be the United States Marine Hospital in New Orleans, with one campus still extant. The U.S. Marine Hospital system was run by the Marine Hospital Service and its successor the Public Health Service, primarily for the benefit of the civilian merchant marine.

The first of the three sites was a Gothic Revival building in the McDonoghville neighborhood on the Mississippi River's south bank. It opened in 1849, but was abandoned in 1858 after a flood and destroyed in 1861 in an explosion of Confederate powder magazines on the site. Over the following decades the river encroached on the site, which is now underwater.

The second location was in the Mid-City neighborhood. It used an innovative cast iron and rammed earth design, but part of the structure sank into the swampy land, and construction was halted in 1860 with only the exterior completed. It was never used as a Marine Hospital, but was used as a military hospital during the Civil War and then a Freedmen's Hospital, and later by the City of New Orleans as an insane asylum and then a boys' house of refuge, although much of the building was by then taken over by squatters. The building was demolished by 1901, and the site is now occupied by the Orleans Parish Criminal Courts Building.

The third location opened in 1885 in the West Riverside section of Uptown New Orleans on the site of a former sugarcane plantation. The 1885 hospital buildings were demolished in the early 1930s, along with nearly all of the original plantation, and replaced with the current Colonial Revival buildings. (The original plantation house remained, which has portions dating from the late 1700s and is believed to be one of the oldest surviving structures in Uptown New Orleans.) This became one of the last operating eight general hospitals in the Marine Hospital system, and when the system was shut down in 1981 by the Reagan administration, the New Orleans hospital was given a jazz funeral. The campus was then used as a state psychiatric hospital, New Orleans Adolescent Hospital, until 2009. Since 2014 it has been owned by the adjacent Children's Hospital of New Orleans (now Manning Family Children's), which has restored and renovated the historic buildings on the campus, which is now listed as a New Orleans Landmark.

== First hospital ==
=== Background and construction ===
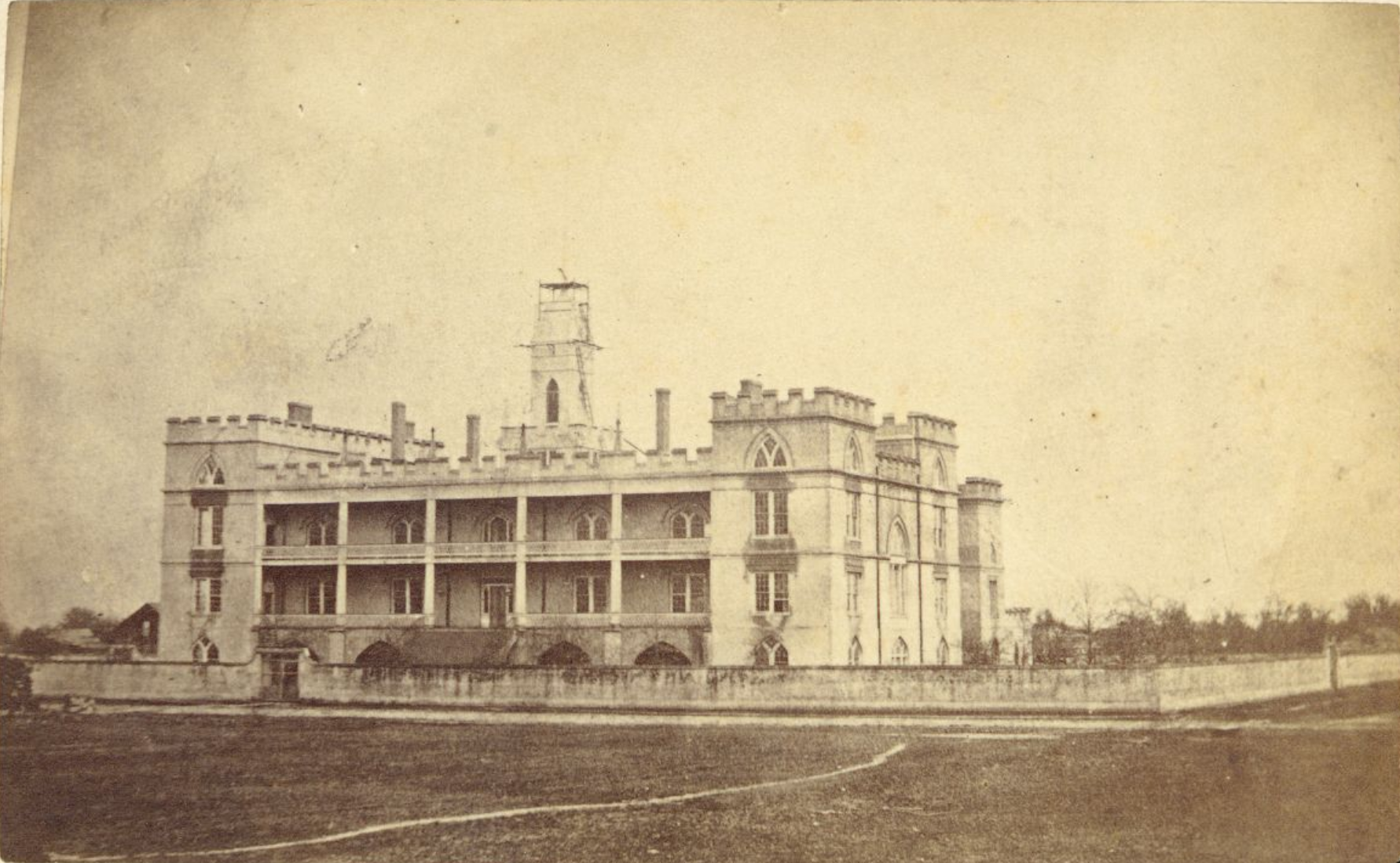
Undated photograph of the first hospital

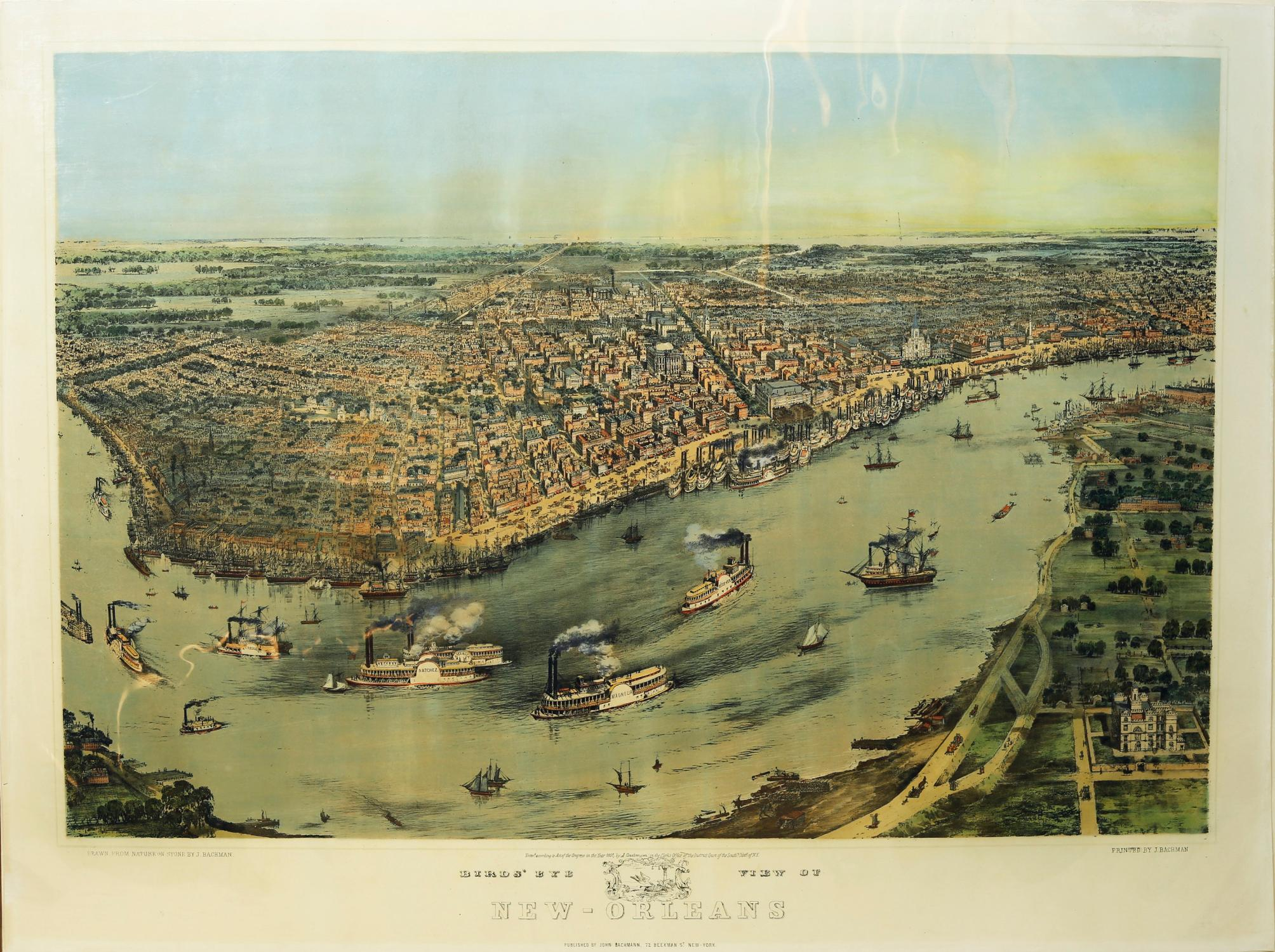
An 1851 lithograph of New Orleans, showing the hospital at bottom right

Congress had first approved a Marine Hospital in New Orleans in 1802, while the city was still part of Spanish Louisiana, due to the large number of American sailors passing through it, but this operated only on a temporary basis during 1804–1809. After this time, sick seamen were sent to a series of contracted private hospitals, most notably Orleans Infirmary during 1825–1841.

The first permanent hospital in New Orleans was opened as part of an effort to extend the Marine Hospital system to the "Western Waters" of the Mississippi River, Ohio River, and Great Lakes. The site on the south bank of the river in the Macdonough neighborhood was purchased in 1837, and construction proceeded despite concerns about its proximity to shipyards and slaughterhouses. Construction proceeded intermittently, occurring in 1838, 1841, and 1845–1850, because the funds appropriated by Congress proved to be insufficient, and Congress delayed approving more funding. The hospital opened in 1849.

Its design was based on a standard plan by Robert Mills and Thomas Lawson that was adapted for each hospital location, in this case in a Gothic Revival style. Mondelli and Reynolds were building contractors. It was made of brick, with a footprint measuring 160 feet (49 m) by 78 feet (24 m), with two wings extending an additional 50 feet (15 m) back, creating a courtyard between them. It was three stories tall, and the top of the flagstaff was 130 feet (40 m) up. It occupied a square block 350 feet (110 m) to a side that was decorated with shrubbery and surrounded by a substantial fence, that was originally a few hundred yards from the river bank. The building was prominently visible from across the river.

=== Closure and later history ===
The hospital was abandoned in June 1858 due to a flood, and a watchman was assigned to the abandoned building until the outbreak of the Civil War. The Confederate government took over the building and the grounds were used to host powder magazines, and the building was completely destroyed in an explosion in December 1861. The property was reportedly sold in 1866, but the site is also said to have been engulfed by the river that year, and by 1899 the site was 200 feet (61 m) from the river bank.

During the time after the 1858 abandonment of the first hospital, patients were treated in Jackson Barracks until 1861. Afterwards, they were treated intermittently in locations including Charity Hospital, Touro Infirmary, and Hotel Dieu until the 1883 opening of the third hospital.

== Second hospital ==
=== Design and construction ===
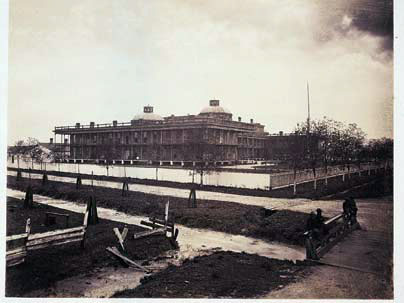
Photograph of the second hospital in 1867

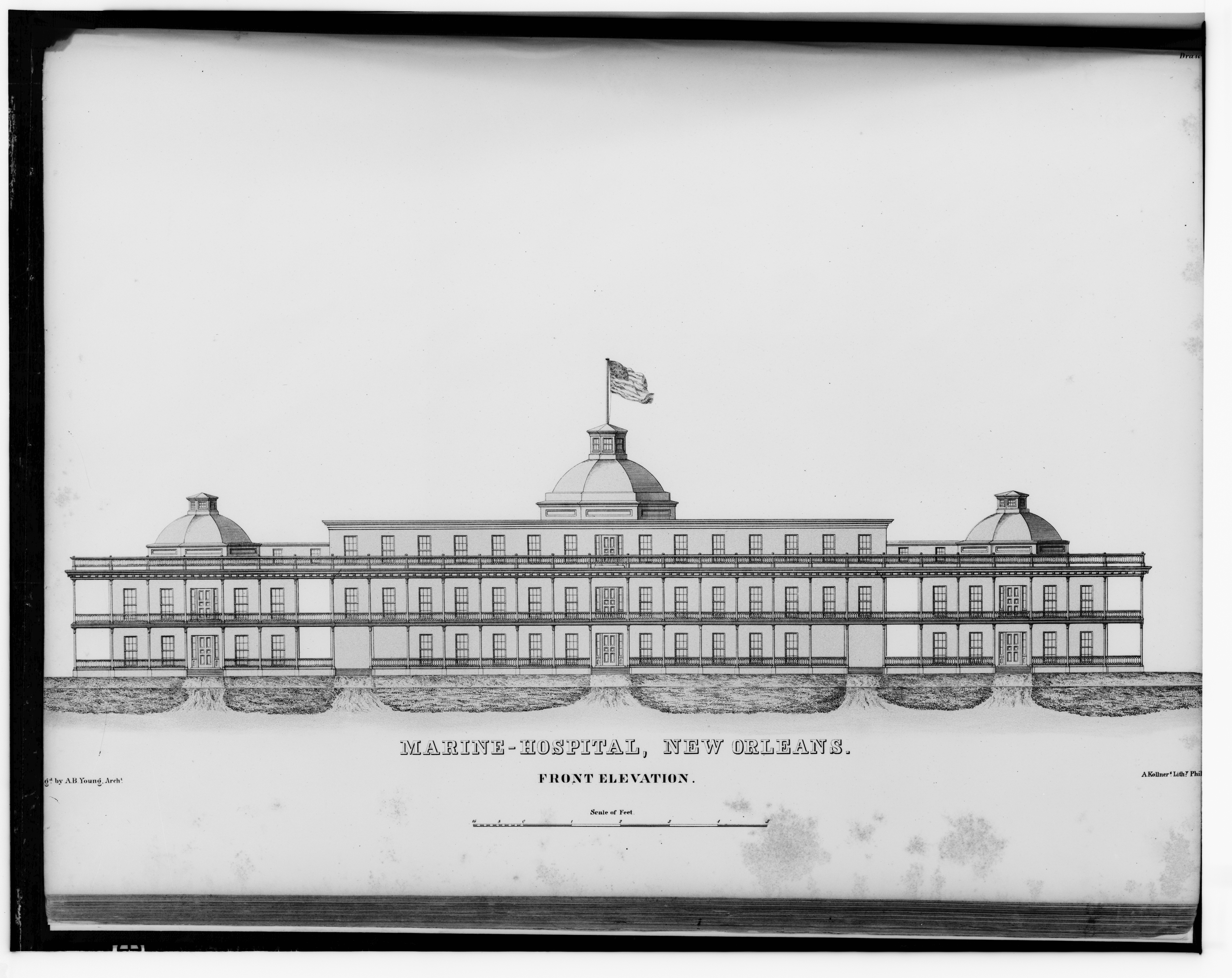
Architectural drawing of the building

The second hospital was in the Mid-City neighborhood. It was only partially completed and was never actually used as a Marine Hospital.

A 5-acre (20,000 m^{2}) site was purchased in 1855 and construction began in 1856, while the first hospital was still in operation. The building was of fireproof cast iron construction in a Roman style, with a three-story main section and two-story wings, each topped with an ornamental domes. The roof was concrete supported by brick arches atop iron beams, with some corrugated iron features. The building was insulated with rammed earth, an innovative design for its time that was thought to be lighter and better suited to swampy conditions.

Nevertheless, some of the walls sank 2 feet (0.61 m) into the swampy ground before completion despite the use of piles, and had to be rebuilt. Construction was halted in 1860 after an expenditure of half a million dollars, with only the exterior of the building completed.

=== Later history ===
During the Civil War, the incomplete building was used as a military hospital after the U.S. Army Quartermaster's Department improved the building by adding floors and a kitchen. During 1865–1869, it was used by the Freedmen's Bureau as New Orleans Freedmen's Hospital, which incorporated a home for refugees and an orphanage. Despite additional drainage and sanitary improvements, the 1872 Surgeon General's Report stated that the site remained unhealthy, and that "it is better that it should be suffered to rust away than to try the experiment" of completing it.

In the late 1870s the City of New Orleans leased it as an insane asylum for African Americans. As of July 1896, one wing was used as a boys' house of refuge, while the rest of the building was occupied by African-American squatters. The building was sold to the City of New Orleans the following month. It was eventually demolished and the Orleans Parish House of Detention was erected in 1901. That building was itself demolished and replaced in 1929 with the current Orleans Parish Criminal Courts Building.

== Third hospital ==
=== Early history ===
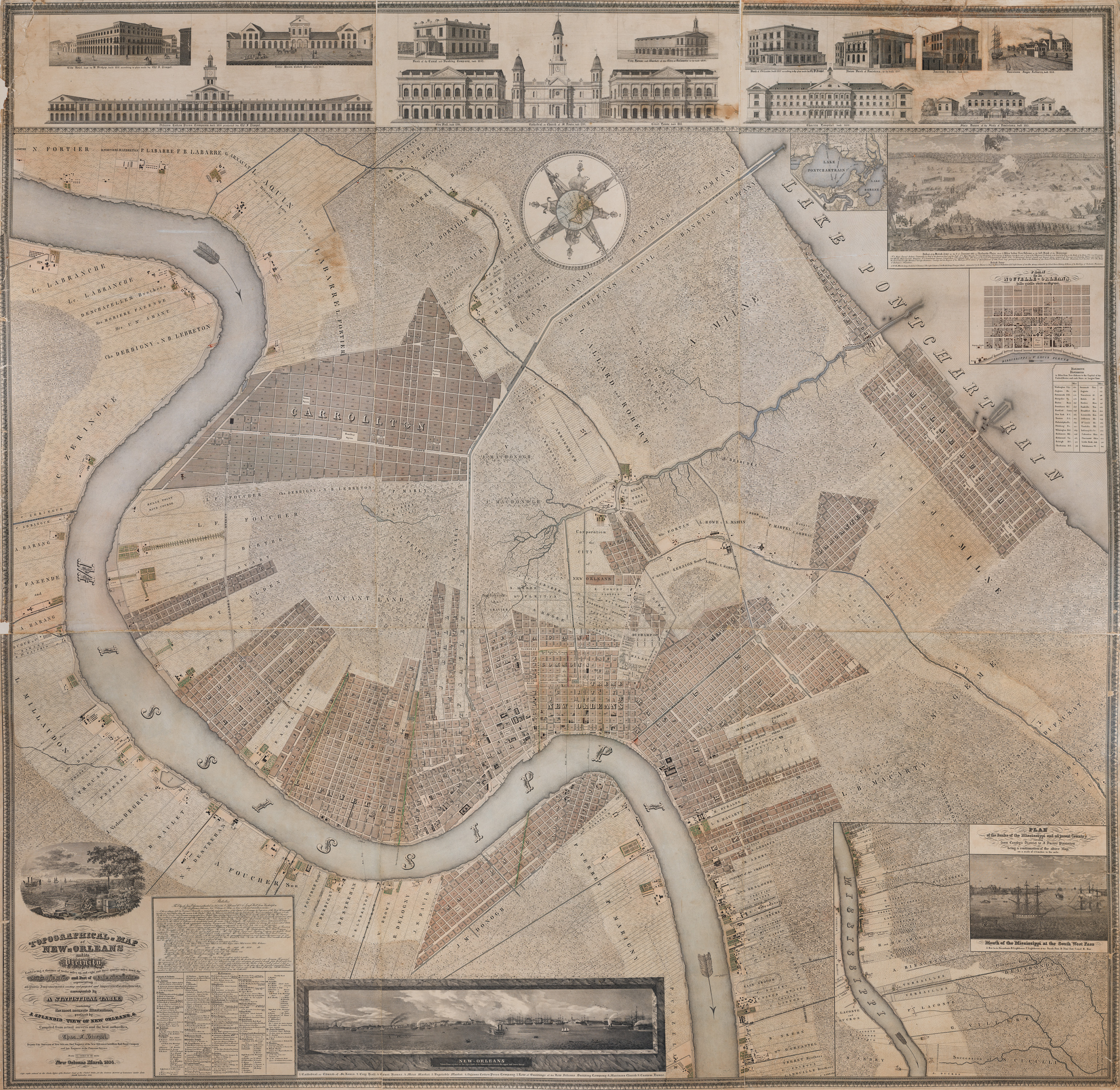
An 1834 map showing the property of Dominique François Burthe at the riverbend at far left

The third hospital is in what is now the West Riverside area of the Uptown neighborhood.The site was originally part of a plantation that had a series of several owners in the 18th and early 19th centuries, including Jean-Baptiste Le Moyne de Bienville, Etienne de Boré, Bernard de Marigny, and Dominique François Burthe.

During the time of de Boré during 1781–1820, it was the first profitable sugarcane plantation producing granular sugar in Louisiana, and extended from roughly 1–4 modern city blocks east of the current property, to partway into what is now Audubon Park. About 100 slaves worked on the plantation. The property ceased to be a plantation in the 1820s, and was later used as grazing land for cattle, a sawmill, and a brickyard.

Burthe purchased the property from Marigny in 1831, and in 1851 he had it subdivided to become the faubourg (suburban development) of Burtheville. Polycarpe Fortier purchased a plot of land along the river in 1857, and his widow sold it to the Marine Hospital Service in 1883 for $35,000. When the Marine Hospital Service acquired it, the plot included 22 acres (89,000 m^{2}) and batture land along the river, hosting an orange grove, six cabins, and a plantation house. The plantation house is believed to be one of the oldest surviving structures in Uptown New Orleans, with its cypress inner frame dating from the late 1700s, and with most of its current core structure believed to have been constructed in the 1830s and expanded with wings and a new facade in the 1850s.

=== Original buildings ===
The new hospital, planned by John W. Glenn, opened in 1885 with a central complex of an executive building connected by covered corridors to three one-story wooden pavilion wards with a total capacity of 100 patients, a kitchen, and a surgeon's quarters. Other new buildings included a lodge house, stables, and a gatehouse. The old plantation house was retained, and the cabins were used as storehouses. A surgeon's house was likely an expansion of an existing 1870s house.

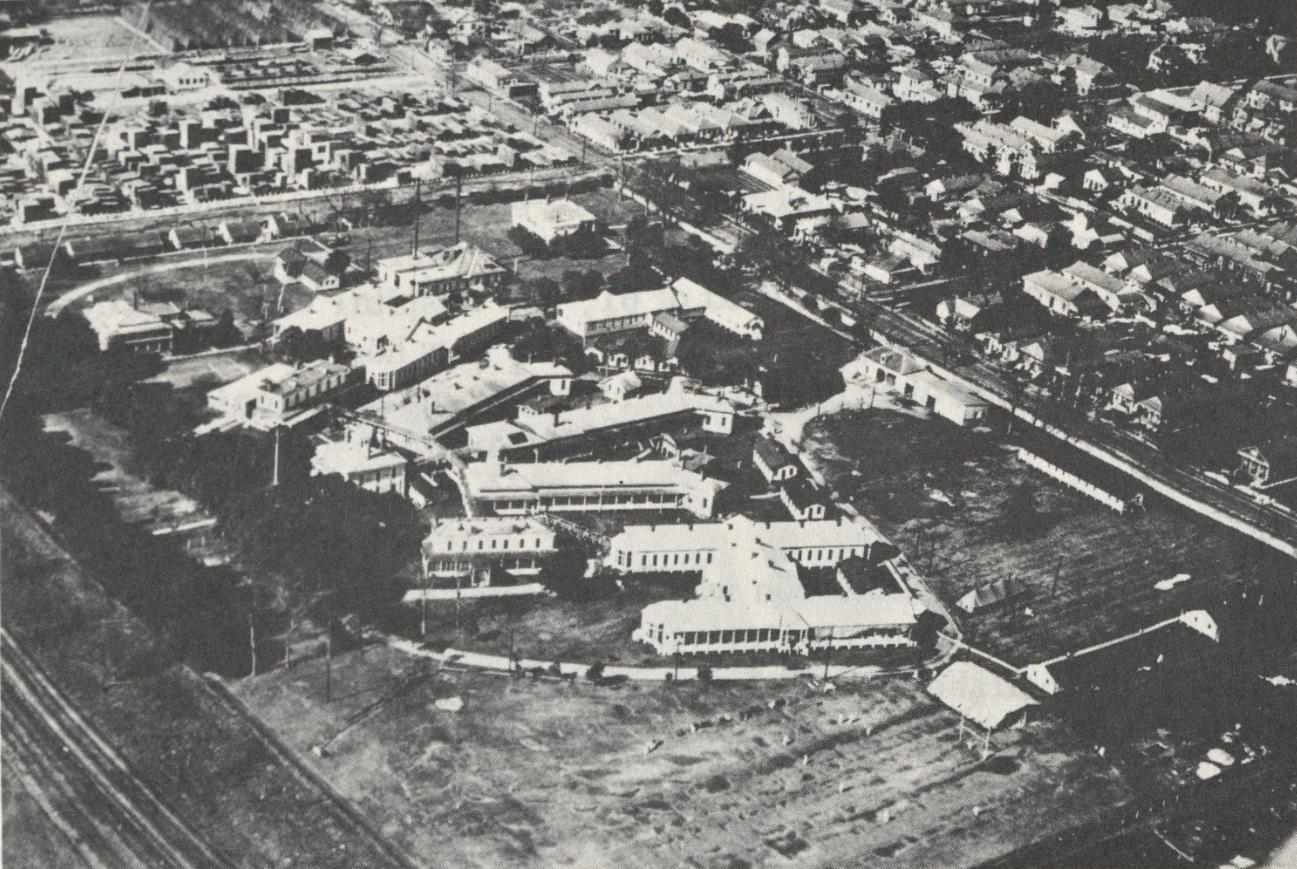
The Marine Hospital in 1928

A brick powerhouse and laundry was constructed in 1896. In 1918, additional hospital wards, an isolation building, and additional quarters were constructed. The Times-Picayune noted that year that "rose bushes, neatly clipped hedges, many flowers and abundant shrubbery afford a place where a man can walk along the trim paths or sit on one of the benches scattered around and be happy in spite of a sling or a crutch."

In 1921, the hospital was hosting 320 patients at a time. In 1925, this had risen to 353 patients, and warehouses were being converted to additional wards. The increase was the result of increased traffic from the opening of the Panama Canal and expansions in the Public Health Service's scope. That year, a report by Secretary of the Treasury Andrew W. Mellon called the hospital inadequate and, due to its wood-frame construction, a fire hazard. This led to the construction of the current hospital buildings.

Nearly all of the original buildings were demolished when the current set of buildings was constructed. The only remaining structures are the old plantation house, now known as the Overseer's House; the surgeon's house, now known as the Director's Residence, the 1885 gatehouse, and the brick perimeter wall constructed at some point between 1859 and 1895.

=== Current buildings ===
==== Marine Hospital ====
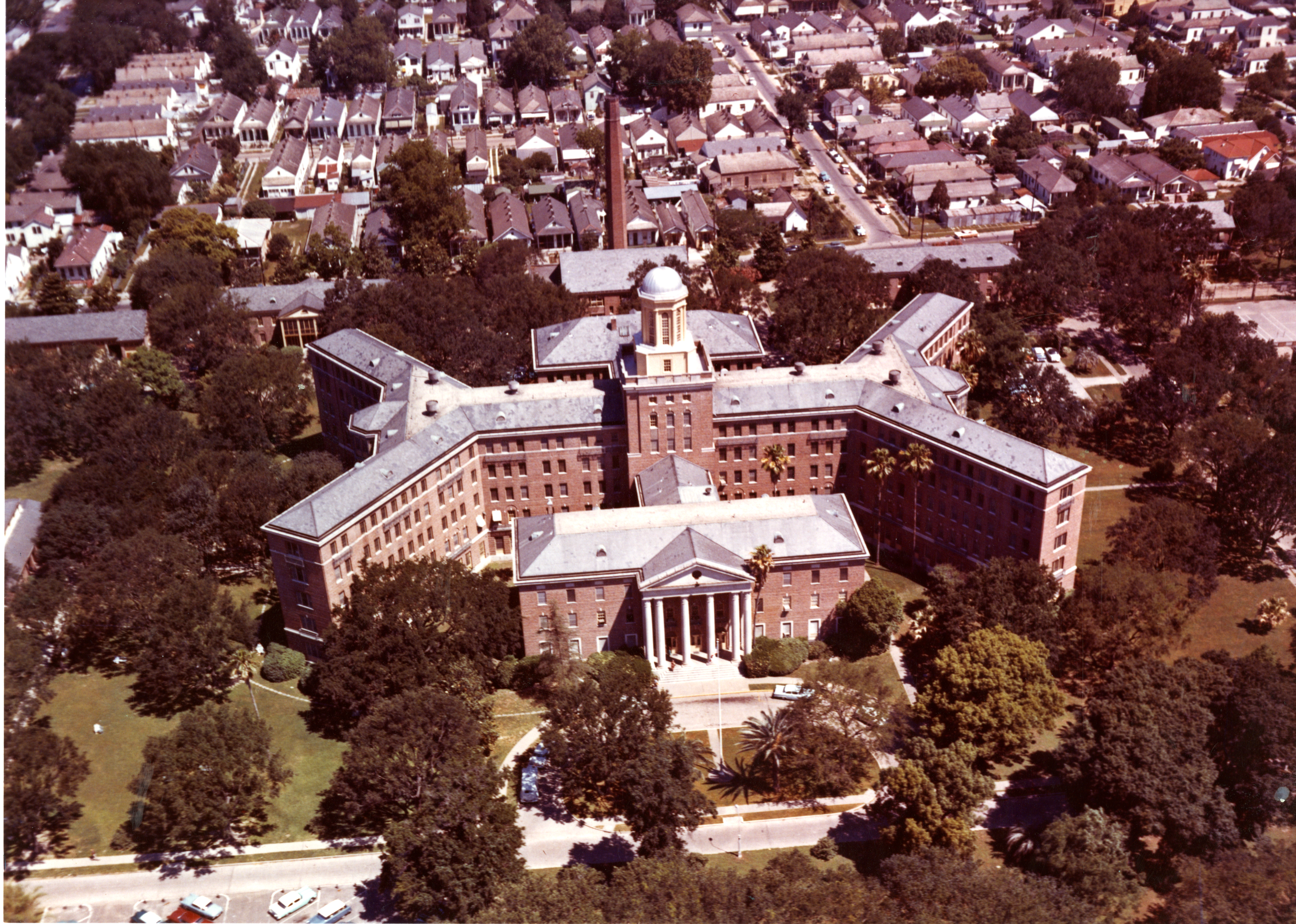
The main hospital building, likely in the 1960s

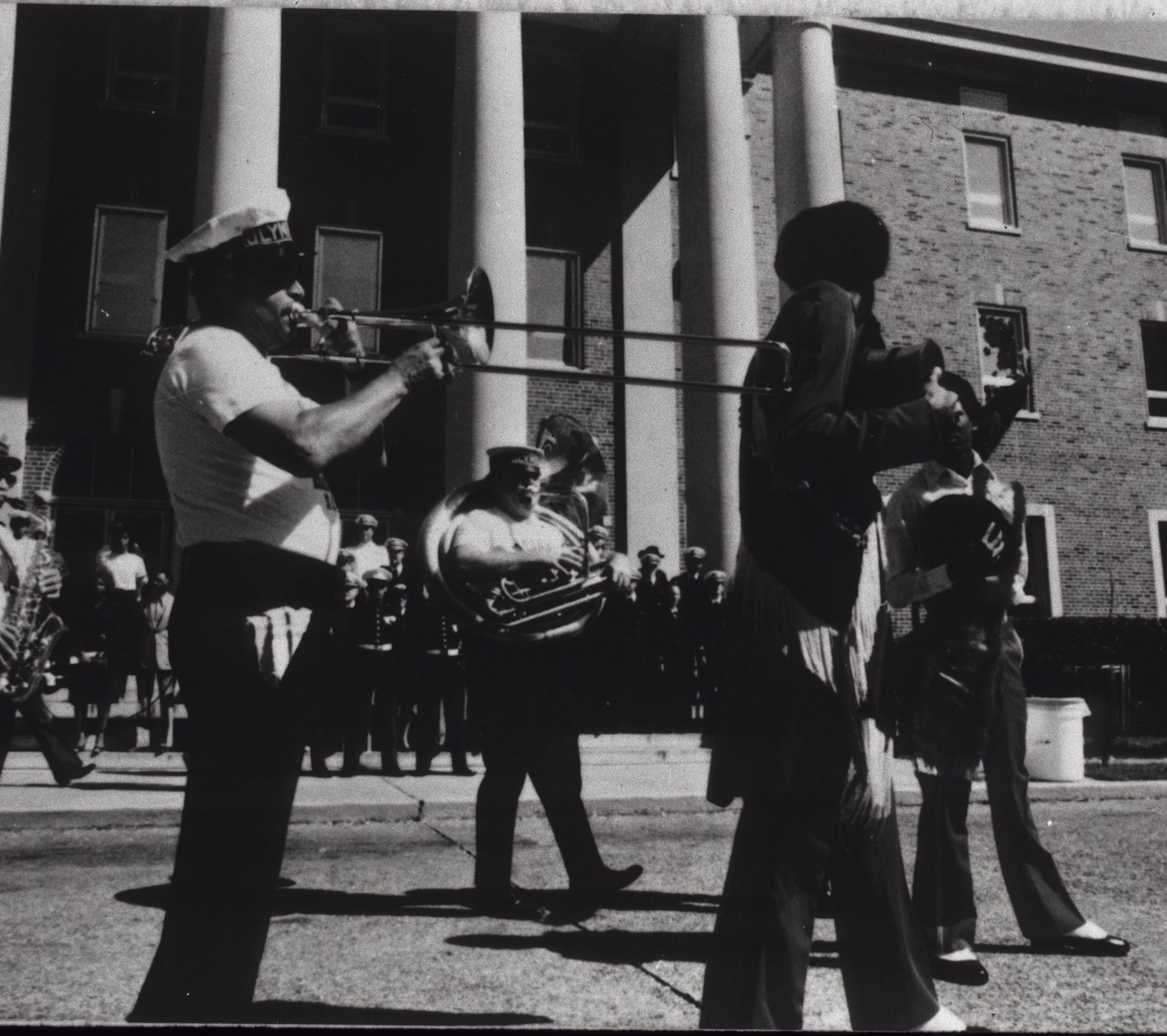
The jazz funeral for the hospital in 1981

Congress approved $2 million for the new hospital buildings in 1927, plans were completed in 1930, and construction was completed in 1934. The campus was designed in the Colonial Revival style by Percy I. Balch under the direction of James A. Wetmore, and R. P. Farnsworth was the contractor. The design was typical of Marine Hospitals constructed during the 1920s and 1930s, with a monumental-scale hospital building surrounded by smaller support and residential outbuildings in a park-like campus. A. D. Taylor did the landscape design, known for its use of live oaks.

The new campus included the main hospital complex as well as several outbuildings for quarters and maintenance purposes along the west and north perimeter of the property. The Overseer's Cottage was moved and rotated to a diagonal position in the corner of the plot, to fit it into the plan for these new outbuildings. A recreation building was constructed in the east part of the campus soon after 1939. By 1968, the 17.4-acre (70,000 m^{2}) campus had 22 buildings and 20 trailers, with 150 Commissioned Corps officers and 464 civil service employees.

After a wave of hospital closings during 1965–1970, only eight general hospitals in the system remained in operation, including the New Orleans hospital. All eight hospitals were closed in 1981 by the Reagan administration and transferred to other organizations. The New Orleans hospital administrators held a jazz funeral for the hospital on October 3, 1981 featuring the Olympia Brass Band and attended by over 3000 people.

==== New Orleans Adolescent Hospital ====
The campus was transferred to the Louisiana State Department of Health and Hospitals, which used it as a psychiatric hospital, the New Orleans Adolescent Hospital (NOAH), beginning in 1982. The campus was included in the large Uptown New Orleans Historic District in 1985.

After damage from Hurricane Katrina in 2005 forced the closure of Charity Hospital, adult beds were added to NOAH. The hurricane damaged buildings on the NOAH campus as well, with the Overseer's House becoming abandoned. As of 2009, NOAH operated about 35 beds, each at around double the cost of those at Southeast Louisiana Hospital. NOAH was closed that year, and its patients were transferred to Southeast Louisiana Hospital.

==== Children's Hospital New Orleans ====
External videos
- Time-lapse video of the old plantation house being moved

The campus was purchased in 2014 by Children's Hospital New Orleans, whose campus was immediately adjacent to the former Marine Hospital's. At the time the buildings were in poor condition after years of neglect, and the hospital planned to renovate most of the historic buildings for use as administrative offices and a conference center. Six badly damaged houses and the wall at the west end of the property were planned to be demolished to provide space for construction of a critical-care center and parking garage.

In 2015, the New Orleans Historic District and Landmarks Commission recommended that most of the campus be designated as a New Orleans Landmark, excepting the buildings slated to be demolished. Children's Hospital New Orleans opposed the landmark status despite its renovation plans due to the added level of bureaucracy, but the campus was listed anyway.

The renovations began in 2017. In 2018, one of the buildings reopened as Hogs House Family Center. The renovations were nearing completion in 2021, with additional buildings to serve as physicians' offices and a Ronald McDonald House, which opened in 2022. The renovation of the Overseer's House occurred during 2019–2022, restoring it to its 1850s appearance and rotating it parallel to the street, after which it was used as a coffeehouse. It was renamed Hales Cottage in honor of Marine Hospital pediatrician and Children's Hospital board member Stephen Hales and his wife Nancy Hales.

=== Gallery ===
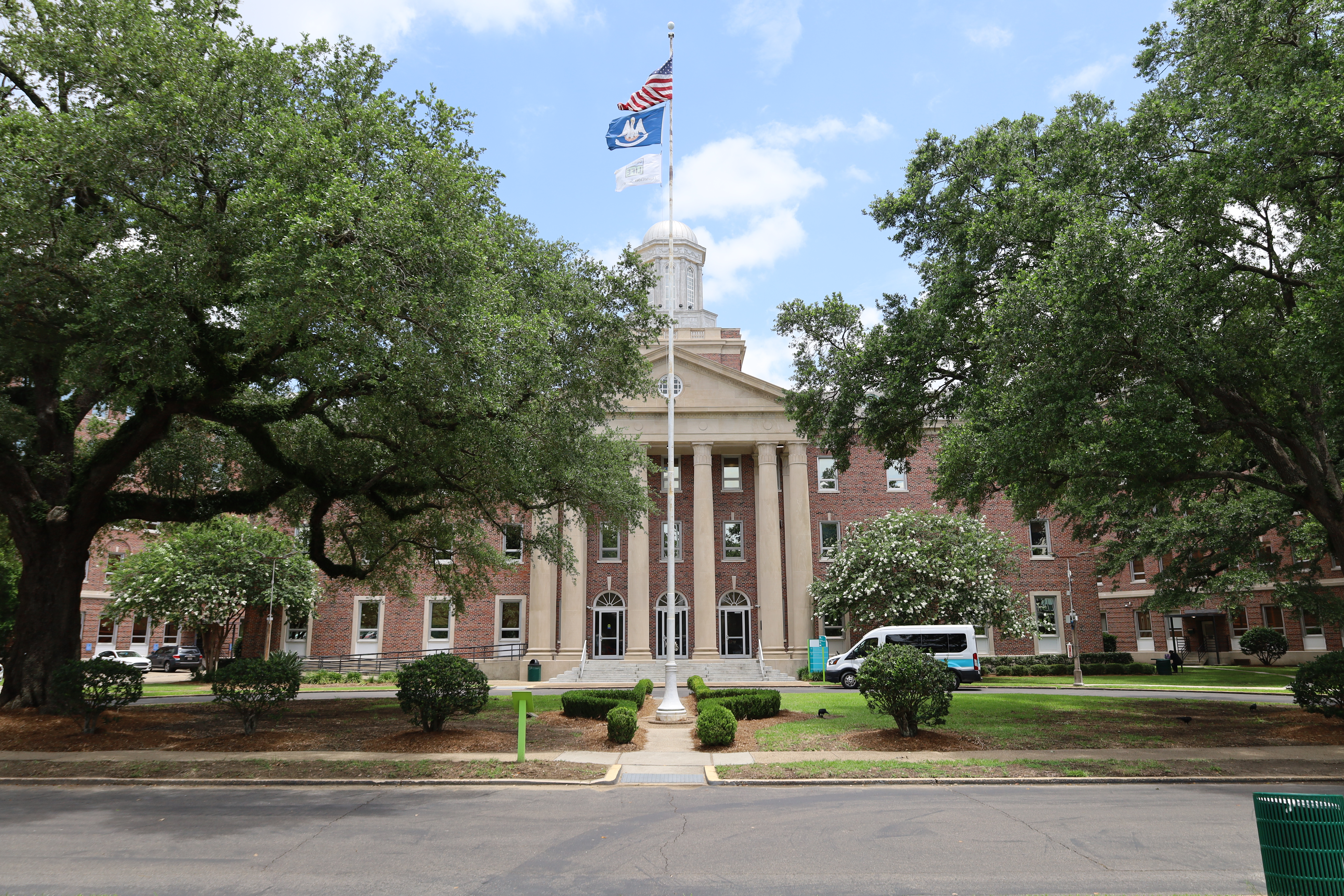
Main Building

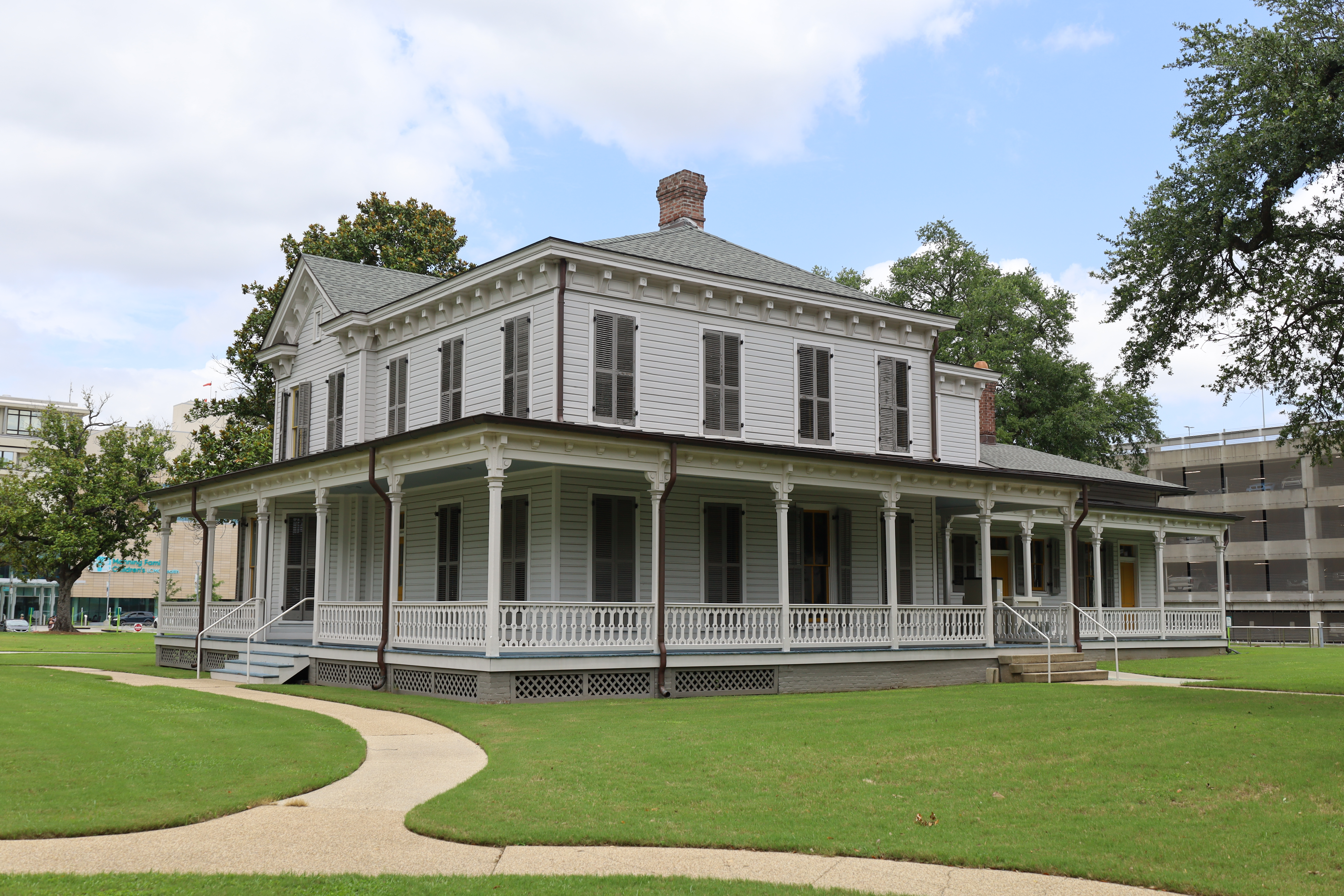
Director's Residence

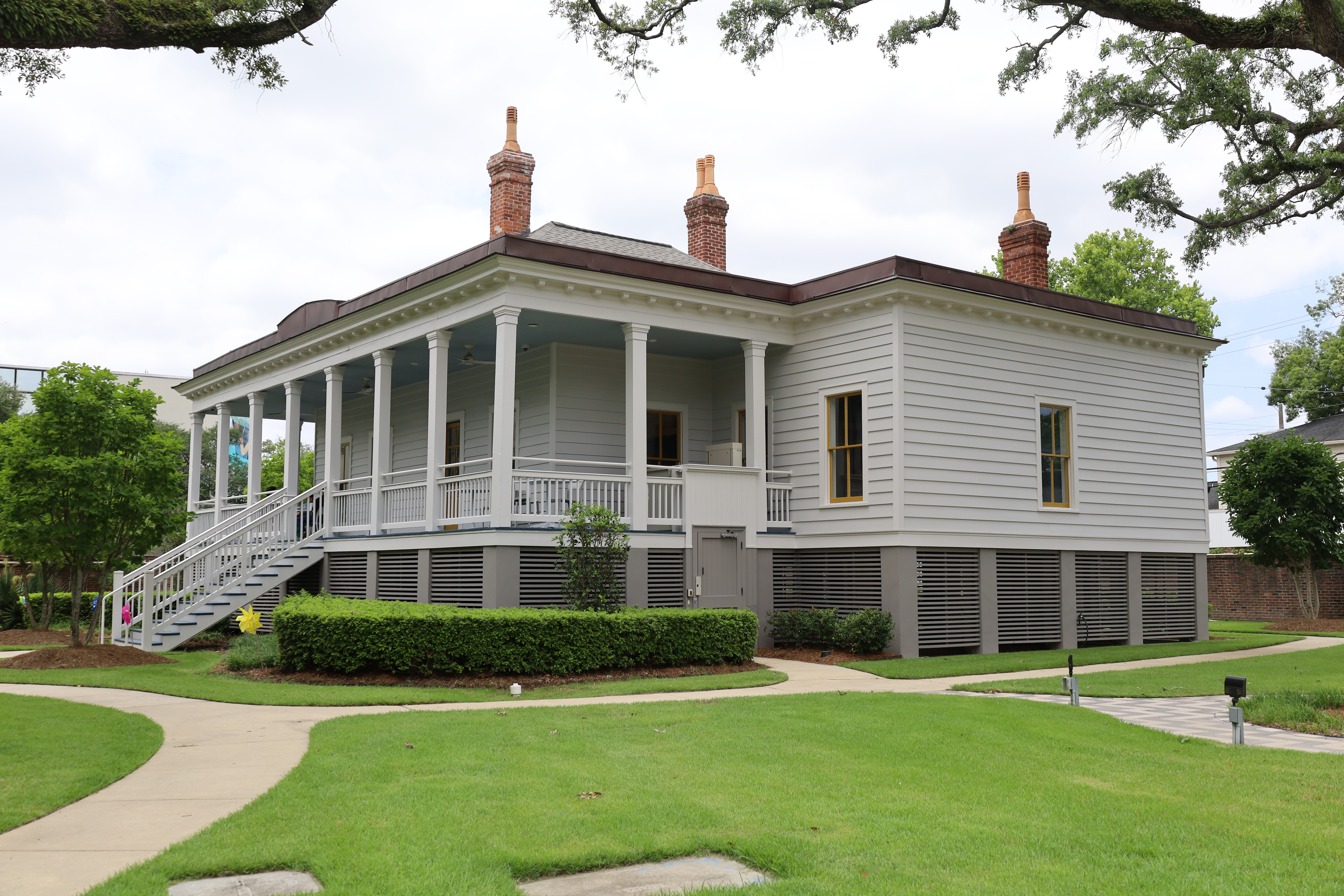
Old Plantation House, now Hales Cottage

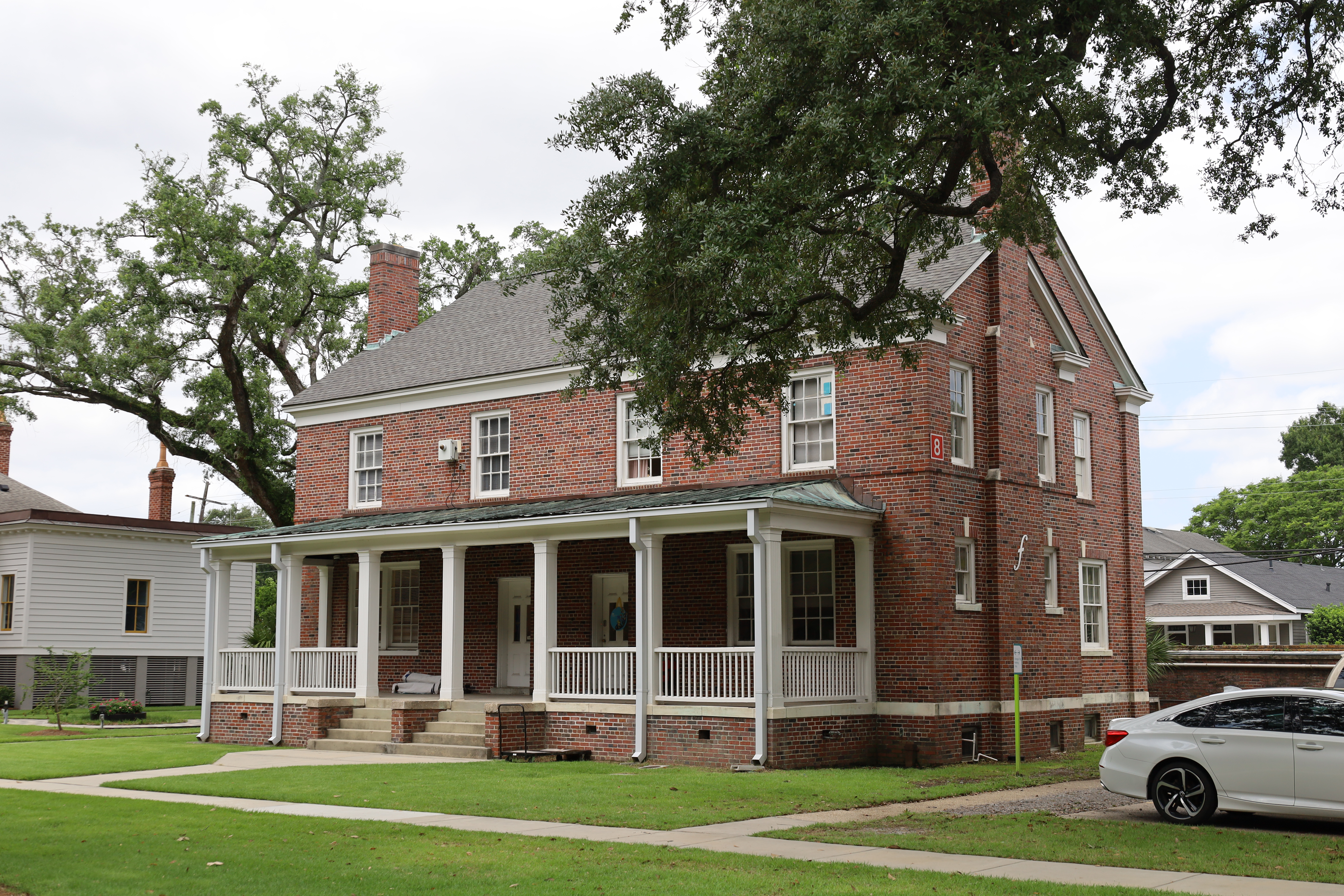
Doctors' Residence

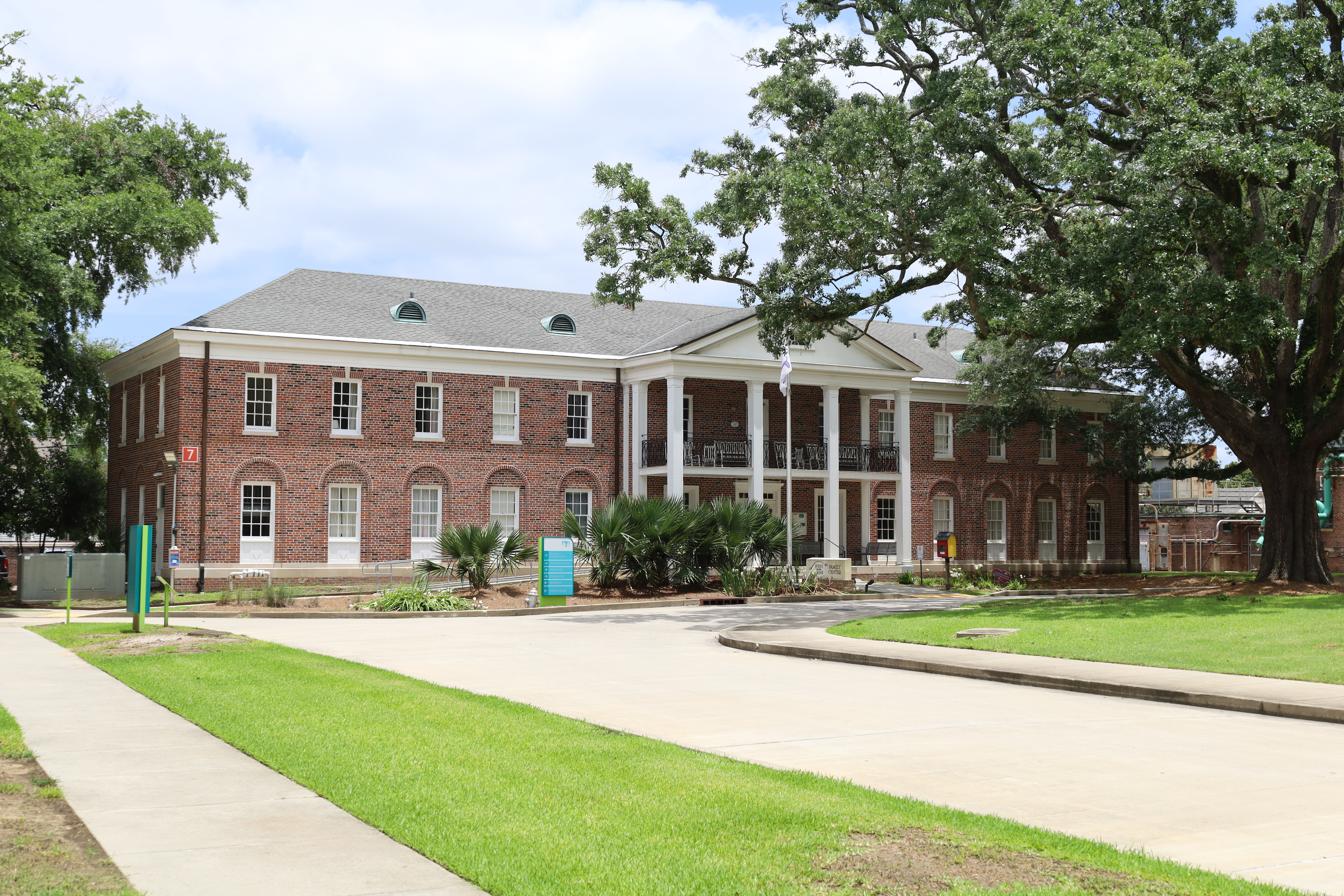
West Quarters, now Hogs House Family Center

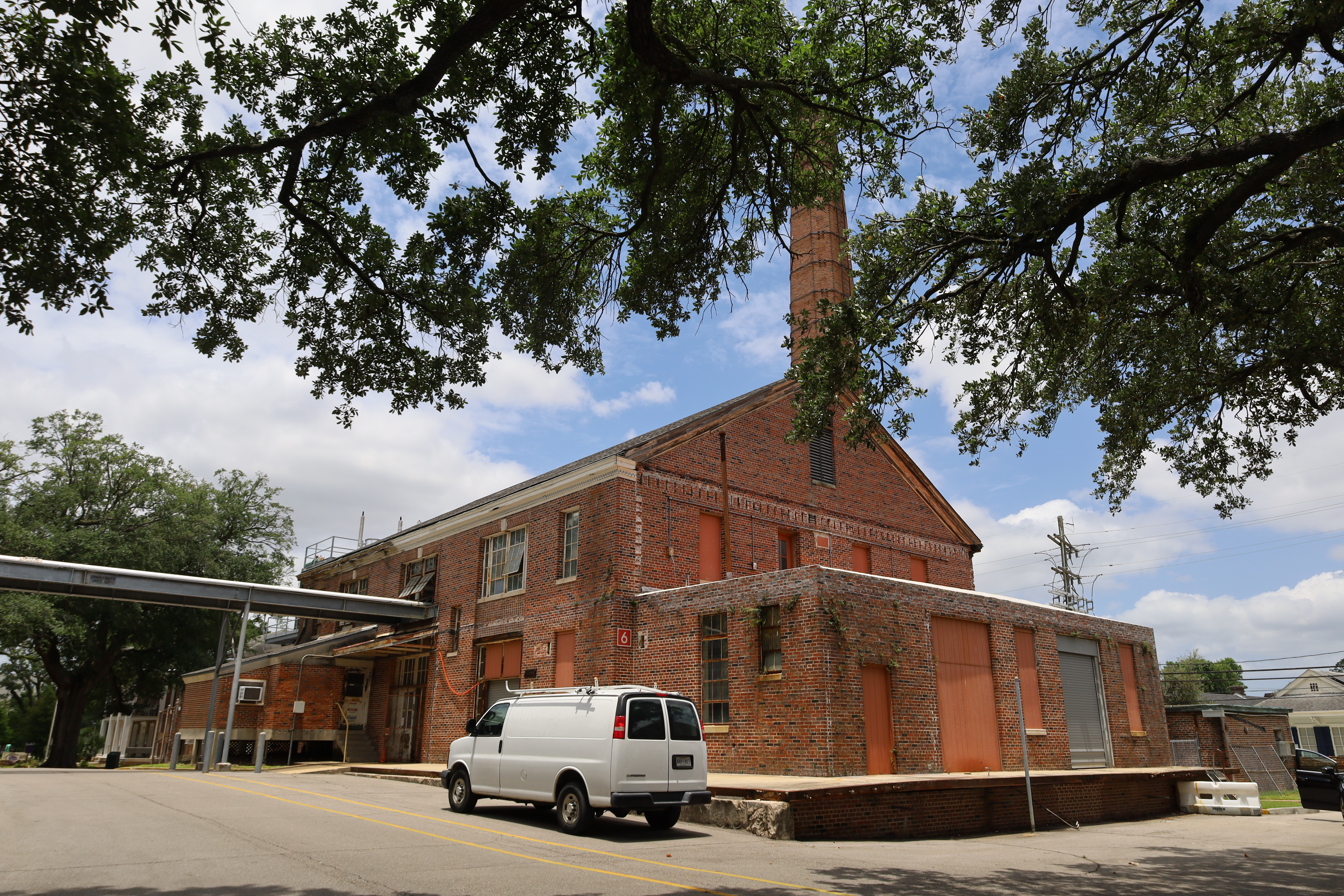
Central Plant

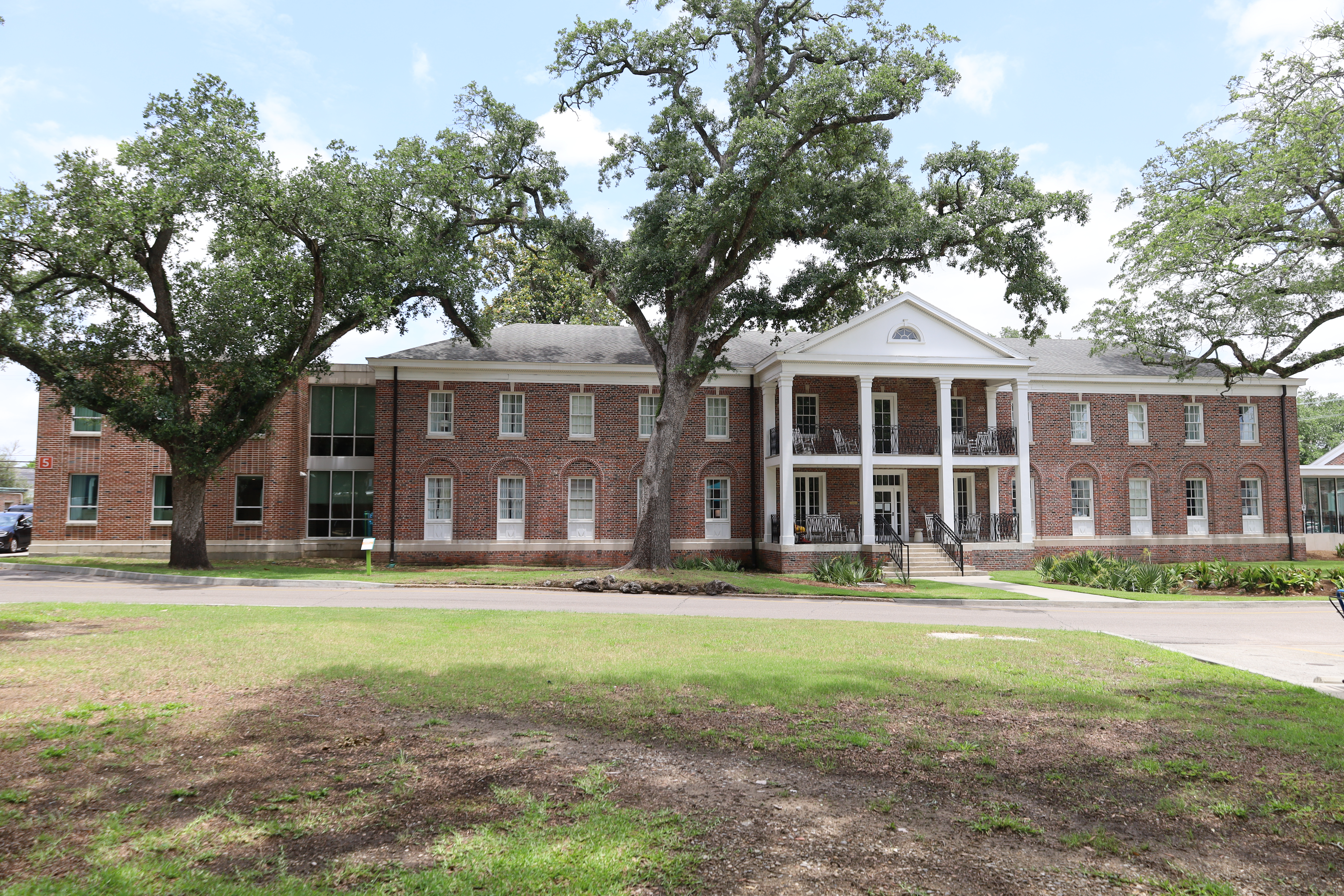
East Quarters, now Ronald McDonald House

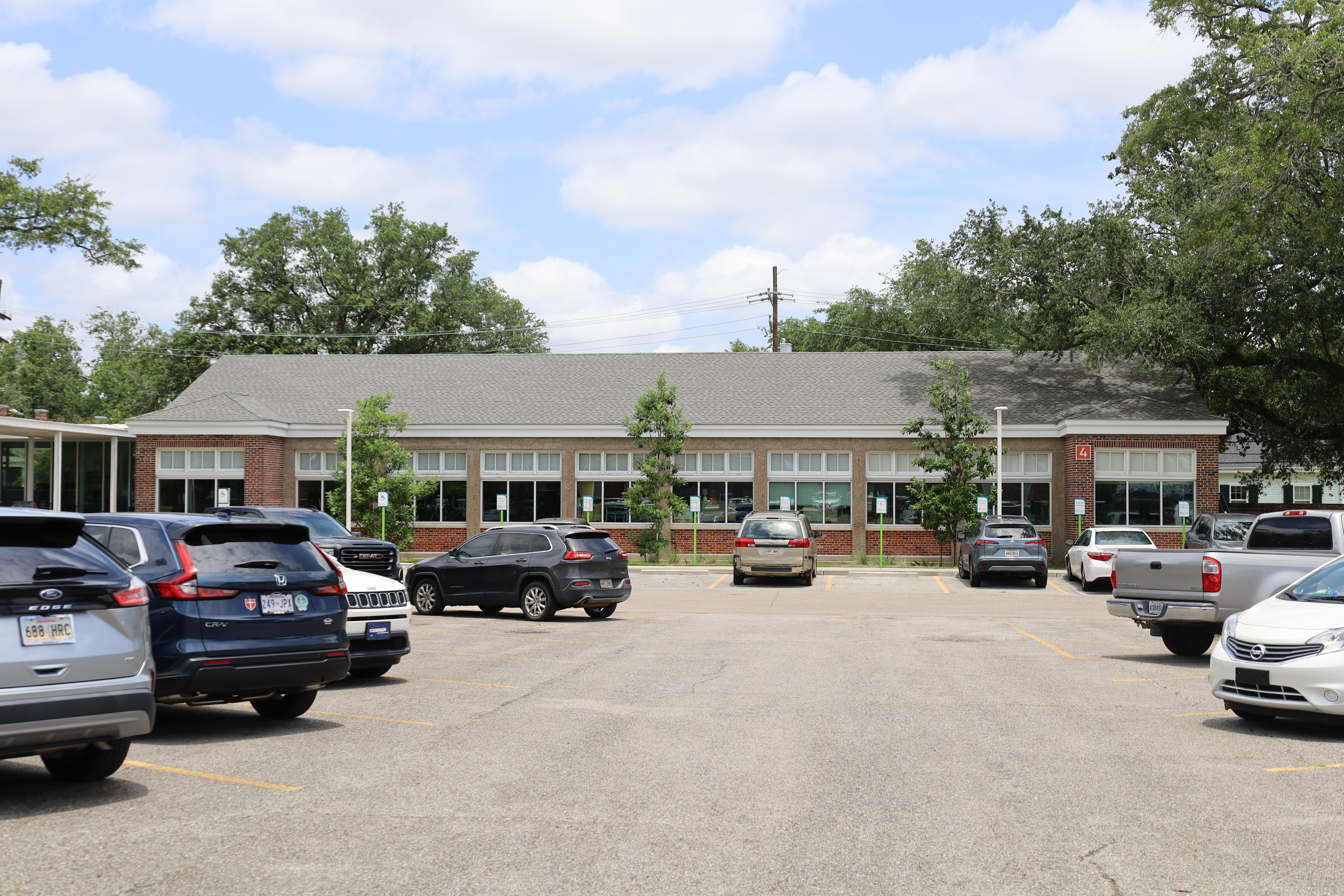
Garage and Shop, now Ronald McDonald House

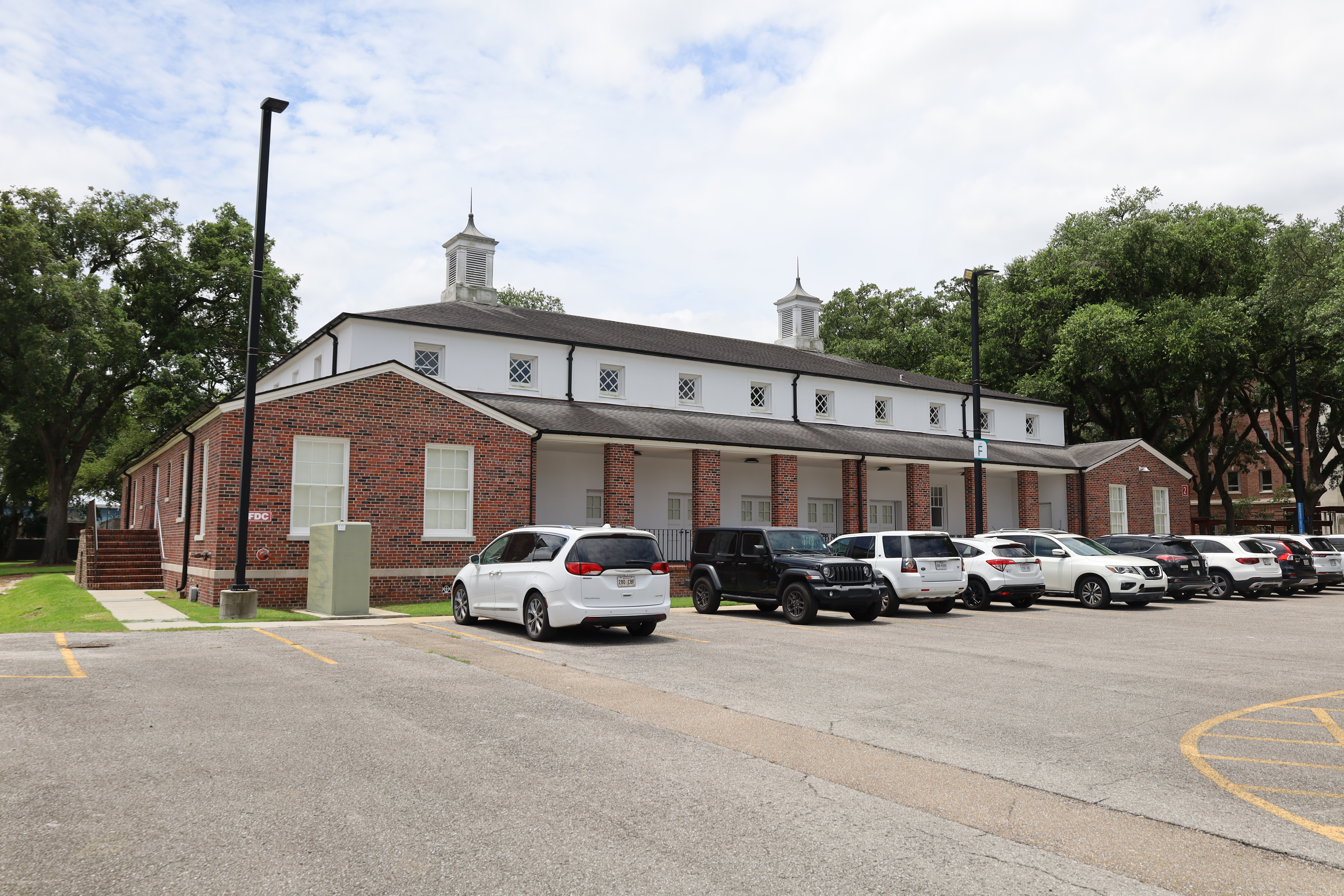
Recreation Hall, now a conference center

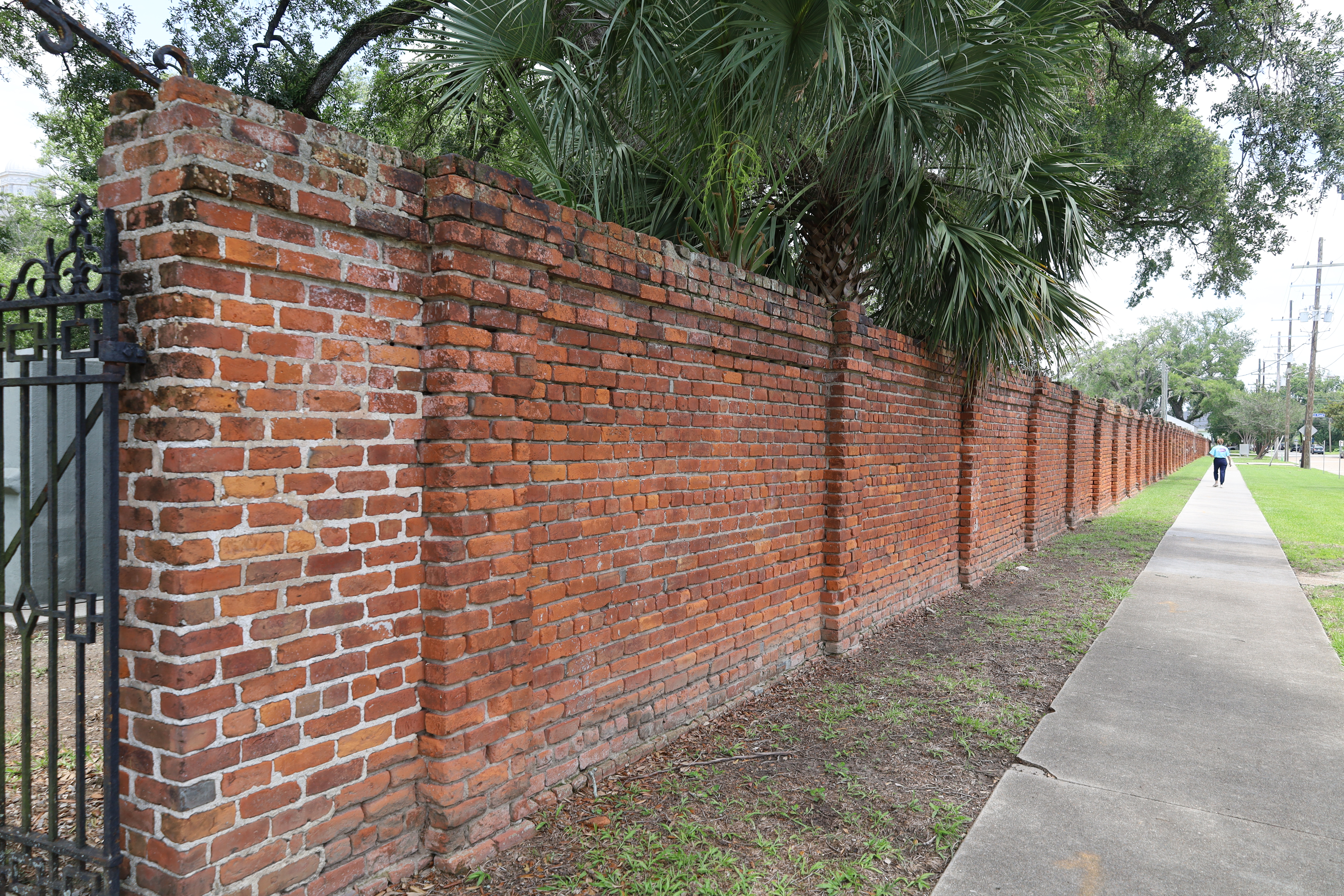
Perimeter wall

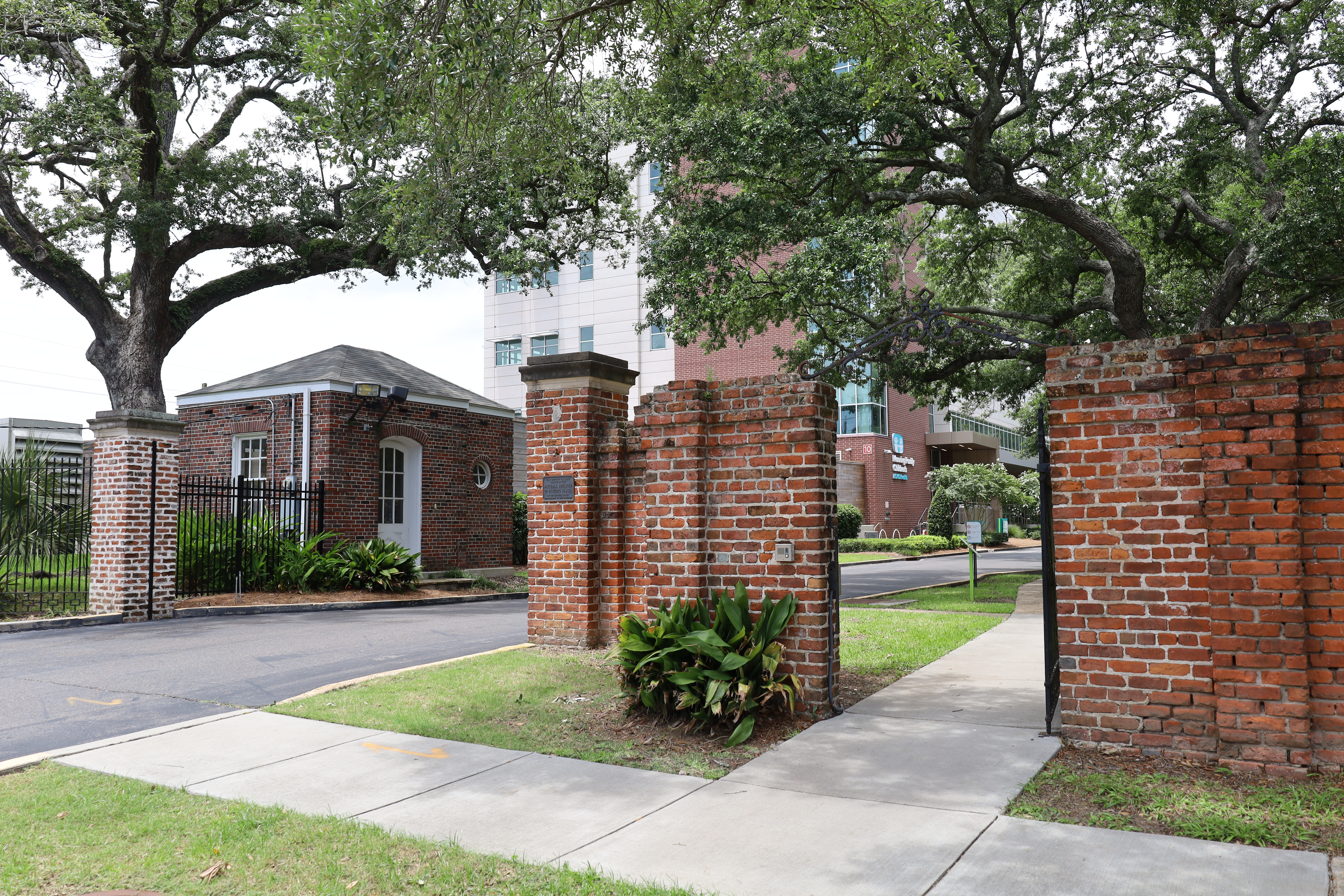
New Gatehouse

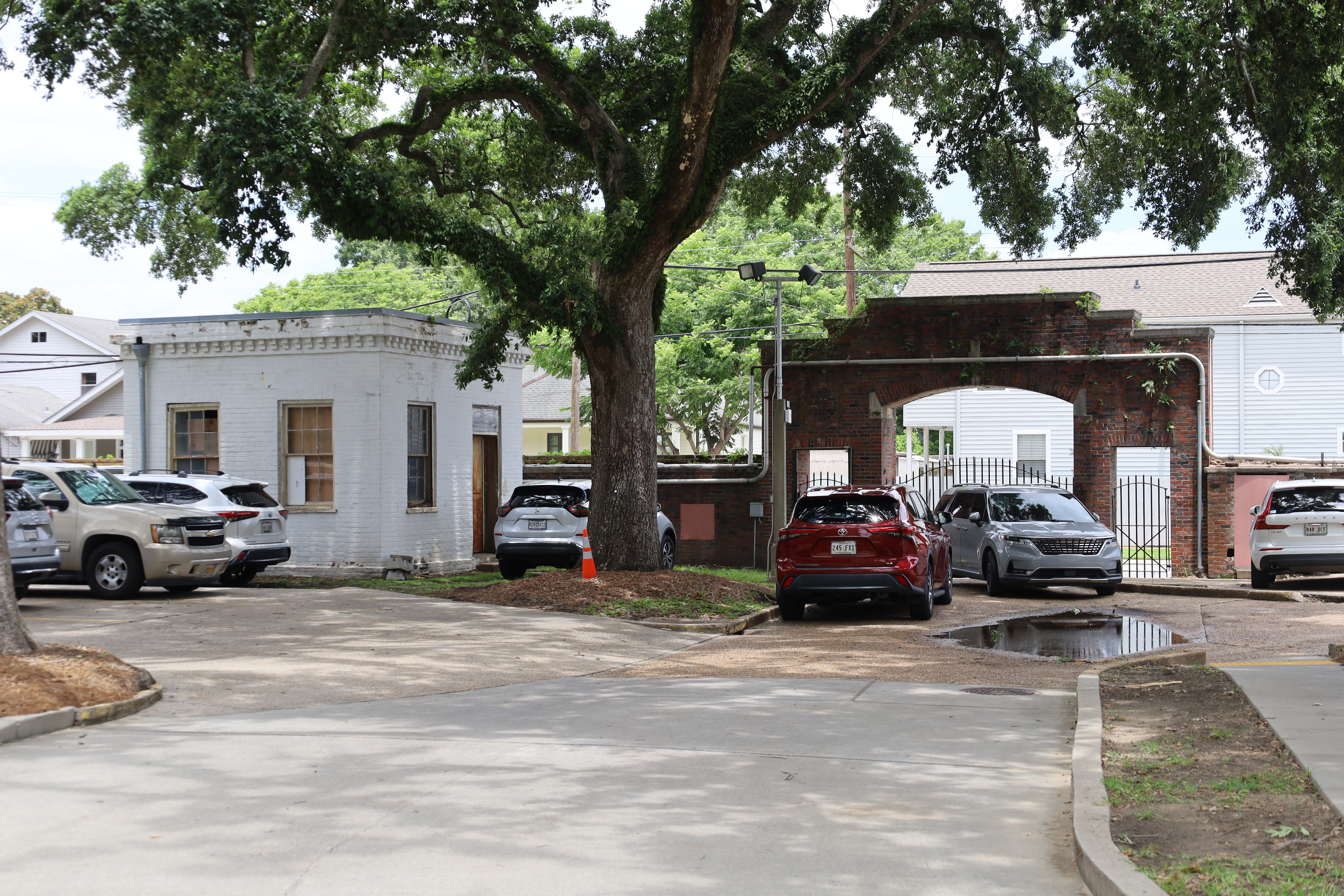
Old Gatehouse
