= Westminster Congregational Church =

Historic church in Missouri, United States

- U.S. National Register of Historic Places
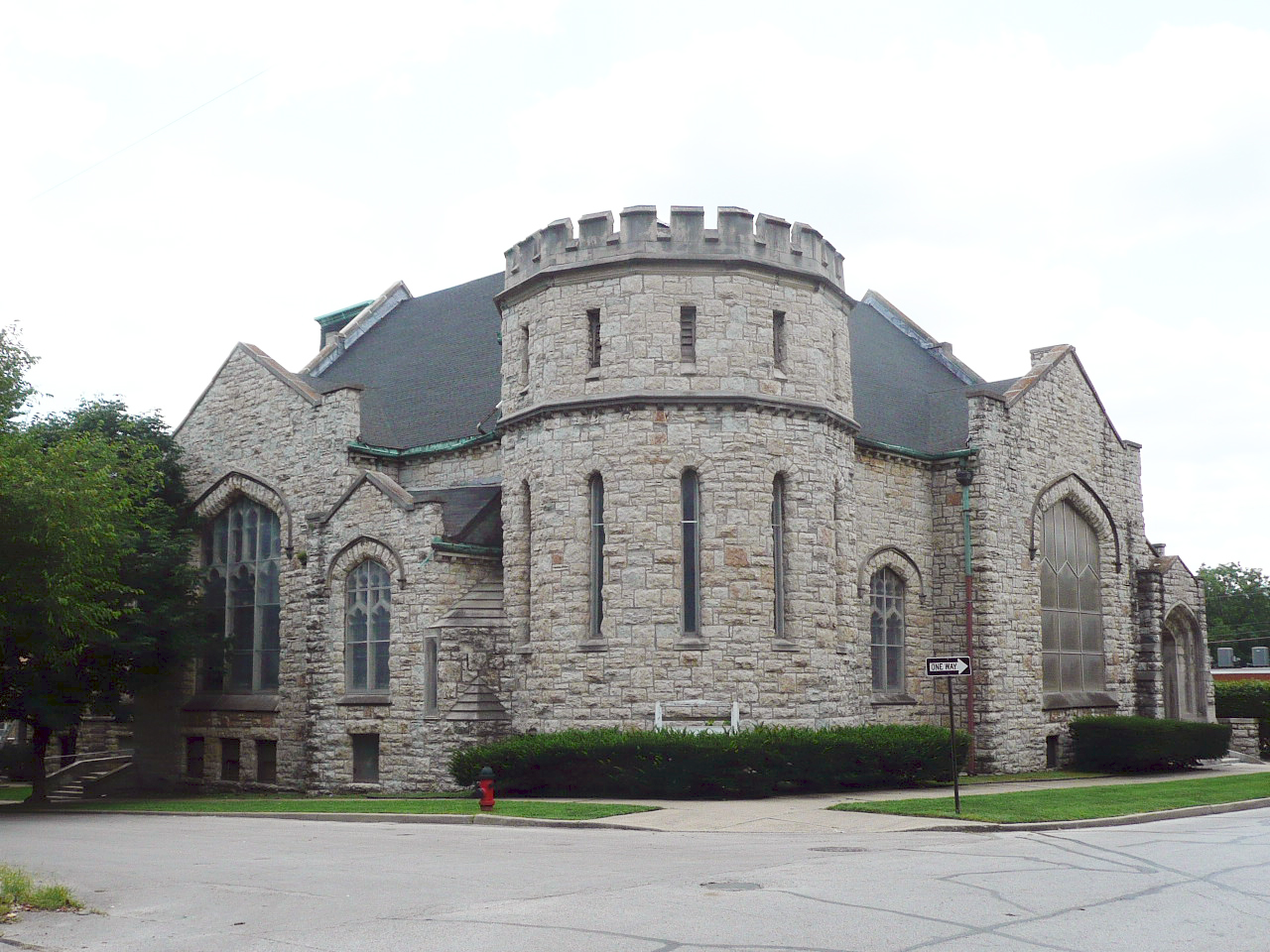

- Location within Missouri Location within the United States
- Location: 3600 Walnut St., Kansas City, Missouri
- Coordinates: 39°3′42″N 94°35′6″W
- Area: less than one acre
- Built: 1904
- Architect: Diboll & Owen; Braecklein & Martling
- Architectural style: Gothic Revival
- NRHP reference No.: 80002369
- Added to NRHP: February 28, 1980

Westminster Congregational Church was an historic Congregational church at 3600 Walnut Street in Kansas City, Missouri.

The church was founded in the summer of 1895, when disgruntled members of the Second Presbyterian Church decided to hold meetings to start a new church. They were headed by Kirkland Brooks Armour (1854-1901) and his wife, Anna Paynter Hearne Armour (1858-1921). At that time, they formed "Westminster Presbyterian Church" and purchased the wood frame church building vacated in late 1894 by Grace Church (now Grace and Holy Trinity Cathedral at 415 West Thirteenth Street), and hired as their minister the Reverend Dr. William Potts George (1847-1909). (The Reverend Dr. George left Kansas City in 1902.) On January 17, 1901, the congregation voted to align with the Kansas City Congregational Union, still located at Tenth and Central Streets in Downtown Kansas City. In 1904, realizing the heavy relocation of residents and residential properties to areas south of Downtown, the congregation contracted for a new building to be constructed on property purchased at the southwest corner of 36th and Walnut Streets. The church contracted the New Orleans architectural firm of Diboll & Owen in cooperation with the local firm of Bracklein and Martling to design a sanctuary patterned after the Prytania Street Presbyterian Church in New Orleans, Louisiana The cornerstone for the new building was laid on May 22, 1904, and the new church building was dedicated in January of 1907. The church building was added to the National Register in 1980.

Despite a protest by a group of architecture preservationists and neighborhood residents, the church was demolished in 2021.
