= Chinatown, New Orleans =

New Orleans Chinatown
- Neighborhood of New Orleans
- Interactive map of New Orleans Chinatown
- Coordinates: 29°57′53″N 90°4′14″W
- Country: United States
- State: Louisiana
- City: New Orleans
- ZIP Code: 70112
- Area code: Area code 504

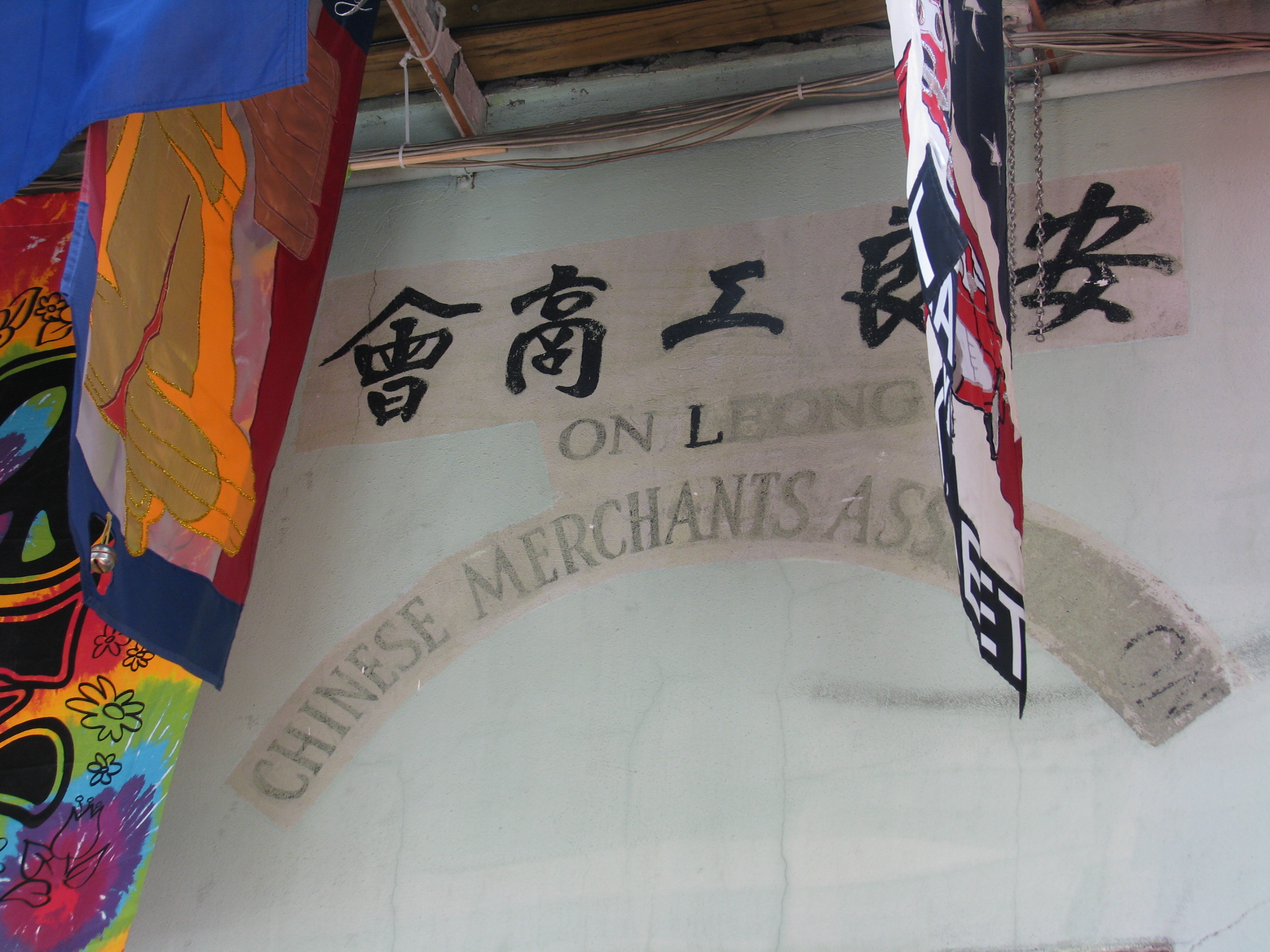
Former On Leong Merchant Association Building, 530 Bourbon Street, New Orleans, Louisiana

The city of New Orleans was once home to one of the largest Chinatowns in the Southern United States. It existed from the 1880s until its destruction by WPA re-development in 1937, and it was located at the end of Tulane Avenue, at the 1100-block near Elk Place and South Rampart Street, south of the Tulane stop on the modern North Rampart streetcar line.

== History ==
The first significant migration of Chinese into Louisiana took place during Reconstruction after the American Civil War, between 1867 and 1871, when local planters imported hundreds of Cantonese contract laborers from Cuba, California, and directly from China as a low-cost replacement for slave labor. By the mid-1870s, nearly all of these laborers had abandoned the plantations and migrated to Southern cities, especially New Orleans, in search of higher pay and better working conditions. The laborers became workers in factories, laborers in levee and railroad construction projects, fisherman, grocers, and especially laundrymen. For many decades, the Chinese came to dominate the hand-wash laundry industry in New Orleans, as they had in other cities. The original unskilled laborers were joined by merchants from California and other states, who provided goods and services to the Chinese, imported tea and luxury goods to the Port of Orleans, and exported Southern cotton and Gulf South dried shrimp to other Chinatowns, China itself, and other countries in Asia.

By the 1880s, these merchants had developed a small Chinatown on the 1100 block of Tulane Avenue, between Elk Place and South Rampart Street. The historic Chinese Presbyterian Mission of New Orleans was located a few blocks to the north on South Liberty Street. Though much smaller than the Chinatowns of the West Coast or the industrial cities of the north, New Orleans Chinatown was the site of several dry goods groceries, import/export companies, apothecaries, restaurants, laundries, and the meeting halls of several Chinese associations. New Orleans Chinatown existed for six decades until the Great Depression, when Chinatown and many of the surrounding ethnic neighborhoods were cleared by the federal government and the WPA re-development in 1937. This was an attempt to bring economic development and new investment to downtown New Orleans, and part of the modern Medical District and Central Business District was built during this time. Today, several office towers stand on the site of the former Tulane Avenue Chinatown.

A few businesses joined the existing Chinese businesses in the French Quarter, which at the time was still an immigrant residential district. These businesses were re-established on or near the 500-block of Bourbon Street, and by the 1940s, a second Chinatown had developed. However the Bourbon Street Chinatown was much smaller than the original Tulane Avenue Chinatown, and the second Chinatown gradually died out over the next three decades. By then, the younger, more educated, and more affluent American-born Chinese were abandoning the laundry industry and migrating to the suburbs, especially the Eastbank of Jefferson Parish, where much of the city's Chinese population lives today. Today, only the former meeting hall of the On Leong Chinese Merchants Association on 530 Bourbon Street still remains under Chinese ownership, the last surviving landmark in New Orleans Chinatown.
