= Benjamin Franklin Cameron =

American judge (1890–1964)

Benjamin Franklin Cameron Jr.
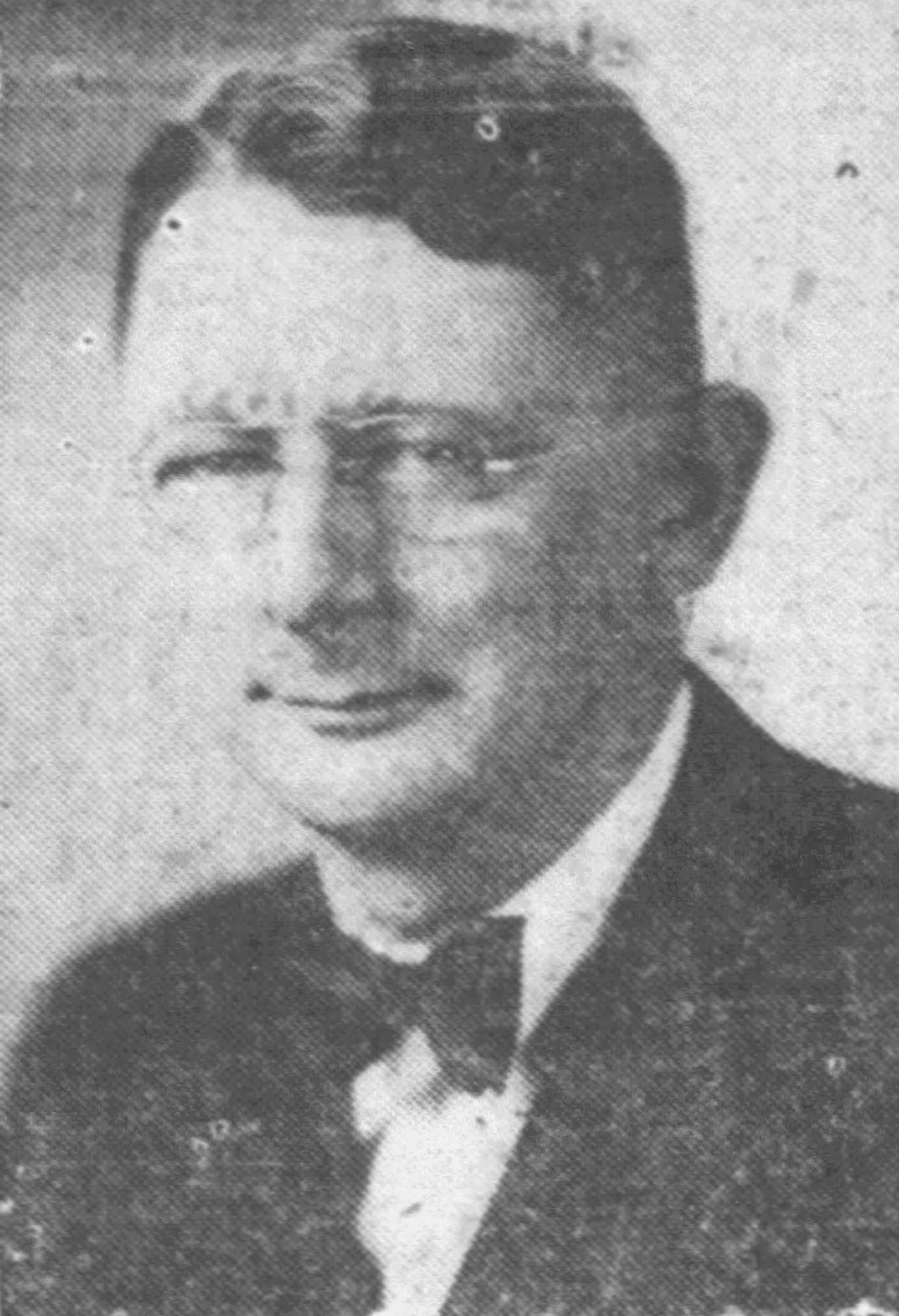

Judge of the United States Court of Appeals for the Fifth Circuit
- In office March 16, 1955 – April 3, 1964
- Appointed by: Dwight D. Eisenhower
- Preceded by: Edwin R. Holmes
- Succeeded by: James P. Coleman

Personal details
- Born: Benjamin Franklin Cameron; December 14, 1890 Meridian, Mississippi, U.S.
- Died: April 3, 1964 (aged 73)
- Parent(s): Benjamin Franklin Cameron Sr., Elizabeth Garner Cameron
- Education: Sewanee: The University of the South (AB); Samford University (LLB)

Benjamin Franklin Cameron (December 14, 1890 – April 3, 1964) was an American jurist from the state of Mississippi. He served as a United States circuit judge of the United States Court of Appeals for the Fifth Circuit from 1955 to 1964. The Fifth Circuit was a key court during the civil rights era in the 1950s and 1960s as it covered Alabama, Georgia, Florida, Louisiana, Mississippi and Texas, all of which had varying levels of racial segregation. During his tenure, Cameron, a segregationist, often found himself in the minority of civil-rights cases, with a group of more liberal judges, known as the Fifth Circuit Four, overturning Jim Crow laws. Shortly before his death, he charged the Chief Judge of the circuit with purposefully assigning these judges to cases with the intent of overturning segregation.

== Early life and career ==
Cameron was born in Meridian, Mississippi. He graduated from Meridian High School. He received an Artium Baccalaureus degree from Sewanee: The University of the South in 1911 and a Bachelor of Laws from Cumberland School of Law (then part of Cumberland University, now part of Samford University) in 1914. He initially worked as a German and Latin teacher at Norfolk Academy before starting his legal practice in Meridian. In addition to his law practice, he was the football coach at Meridian High School for five years.

In 1928, Cameron supported Herbert Hoover and became affiliated with the Republican Party after Democratic candidate Al Smith supported the repeal of prohibition during the 1928 presidential election. In testimony before the U.S. Senate, Cameron stated that he was an independent but voted for Republicans. After Hoover's election, Cameron was nominated as the United States Attorney for the Southern District of Mississippi and served through the end of Hoover's term.

Cameron returned to private practice until 1955. In 1940, Cameron argued Opp Cotton Mills v. Administrator of W. and H.D. before the United States Supreme Court. Cameron represented a cotton mill and argued to overturn a minimum wage set by the Wages and Hours Division of the United States Department of Labor under the Fair Labor Standards Act of 1938 which he alleged violated the Tenth Amendment and the Fifth Amendment. The Supreme Court, in a unanimous opinion authored by Justice Harlan Stone ruled against Opp Mills.

In 1946, he testified before the Senate Special Committee to Investigate Senatorial Campaign Expenses, which reviewed the campaign activities of Senator Theodore G. Bilbo in his 1946 re-election campaign. In addition to questions about his use of campaign funds, Bilbo was accused of an openly racist campaign that advocated violence to prevent blacks from voting in the election. In his statement to the committee, Bilbo stated that he believed in white supremacy and white control and that he wrote to a newspaper asking blacks to stay out of the "white primary election." Cameron defended Bilbo in that he felt the senator had always encouraged peaceful relations between races and that "outside influences" were trying to make trouble in Mississippi.

== Judicial career ==
With the retirement of Judge Edwin R. Holmes, President Dwight Eisenhower nominated Cameron as his replacement on the Fifth Circuit on February 18, 1955. He earned the support of both of the states segregationist senators James Eastland and John Stennis as well as the American Bar Association and the NAACP. Cameron was confirmed by the United States Senate on March 14, 1955, and received his commission on March 16, 1955.

In an early voting rights case, Darby v. Daniel in 1958, a black man sued the registrar of Jefferson Davis County, Mississippi over the registrar's refusal to register him to vote. At the time, the Mississippi Constitution required voters to pass a literacy test which required the voter to "read and write any section of the Constitution of this State and give a reasonable interpretation thereof to the county registrar. He shall demonstrate to the county registrar a reasonable understanding of the duties and obligations of citizenship under a constitutional form of government." The registrar deemed that Darby had not passed the test. In his opinion joined by Claude Feemster Clayton and Sidney Carr Mize, Cameron applied the Minor v. Happersett precedent in ruling that the privilege of voting was not given by the constitution and that states could govern their own elections.

After Darby v. Daniel, Cameron often found himself in the minority on civil rights cases. In 1960, the Fifth Circuit ruled in Dixon v. Alabama that public colleges had to afford students some due process before disciplining or expelling students. In this case, nine students at the Alabama State College for Negroes, now Alabama State University, were expelled after a protest in which 29 students conducted a sit in at a segregated snack counter at the Montgomery County courthouse. Afterwards Governor John Malcolm Patterson ordered the students that he perceived were the ringleaders to be expelled. The court overturned the expulsions. Cameron dissented, writing that "They were accused and convicted by competent proof, including a picture and writings authored by them, of public boorishness, of defying the authority of the officials of their school and state, of blatant insubordination, of endeavoring to disrupt the school they had agreed to support with loyalty, as well as to break up other schools, and had openly incited to riot; and when their time came to speak, they stood mute, offering only one of their group along with the college president and two newspaper reporters as witnesses." Part of his dissent was devoted to sections on how many demonstrations were organized by advocates for the students. He concluded, "March 6, 1960, several thousand Negroes, including appellants and hundreds of the students of the college assembled near the steps of the capitol and approximately ten thousand white people gathered in the same vicinity. A large gathering of city and county officers and the use of fire hose finally avoided an open clash between the two groups."

The 1962 case James H. Meredith v. Charles Dickson Fair, et al. was a case in which Cameron was not assigned, but he inserted himself into it after the ruling. On June 25, 1962, Judges John Minor Wisdom, John Robert Brown with Dozier A. DeVane dissenting ruled that James H. Meredith could register at the University of Mississippi, which had denied him admission on account of his race. The day after the court's order took effect, July 18, Cameron, who was not part of the panel that heard the case, issued a stay. On July 27, the court vacated his stay. Cameron issued three more stays in the case through August, seeking to block integration at the school. On September 10, Justice Hugo Black voided all of Cameron's orders in the case. After Governor Ross Barnett personally blocked Meredith from registering, the entire Fifth Circuit heard the case en banc and held Barnett in contempt. Cameron was not present for the hearing.

In his dissent in Armstrong v. Board of Education of City of Birmingham, Cameron charged that the Chief Judge Elbert Tuttle would assign judges who had a more liberal view of civil rights to the majority of those cases, specifically, those whom he called "The Four." He accused Tuttle of ensuring that two members of "The Four", Tuttle, Brown, Wisdom or Richard Rives were empaneled in 22 of 25 cases dealing with civil rights while the other members of the court sat in the majority in only 12 cases. Cameron requested that the case be heard en banc, but Tuttle claimed he polled the active judges and they rejected an en banc hearing. Rep. George W. Andrews, who once wrote "They put the Negroes in the schools and now they've driven God out," proposed an inquiry into Cameron's charges. Senator James Eastland, who headed the Senate Judiciary Committee, also ordered a staff inquiry.

Journalist Jack Bass found that Cameron's analysis was partially inaccurate in that he counted every phase of a case as a single incident and left certain cases out of his count. In addition, certain assignments were dictated by Cameron himself. He had asked Tuttle not to include him on any cases were Tuttle was also on the panel. Because Cameron insisted on later afternoon conferences, another judge on the court asked not to be on a panel with him. Two other judges were not assigned to civil rights cases as their recess appointments had not been confirmed by the Senate, leaving only four judges who were able to sit on every case with Cameron. Judge Warren Leroy Jones, another member of the court learned that Tuttle was not necessarily assigning judges, rather Judge John Robert Brown had been doing so as he had done when Judge Joseph Chappell Hutcheson Jr. had been the Chief Judge of the Circuit. The Clerk of the Court did write to the judges that Judge Brown had asked him to delay the hearing of certain civil rights cases when Cameron, Walter Pettus Gewin and Griffin Bell were scheduled to sit. As a compromise with the court, Tuttle replaced Wisdom on a voting rights case, United States v. Mississippi (1964), that the government brought regarding literacy tests as well as provisions requiring good moral character to vote. Cameron, now with William Harold Cox, held the majority over Brown and dismissed the government's case. In 1965, the Supreme Court reversed the decision.

Before the Mississippi case was sent back to the Fifth Circuit, Cameron died on April 3, 1964. He was replaced on the court by James P. Coleman, who had referred to himself as a "successful segregationist".

== Sources ==
Legal offices
Preceded by Edwin R. Holmes	Judge of the United States Court of Appeals for the Fifth Circuit; 1955–1964	Succeeded by James P. Coleman
