= Warren Leroy Jones =

American judge (1895–1993)

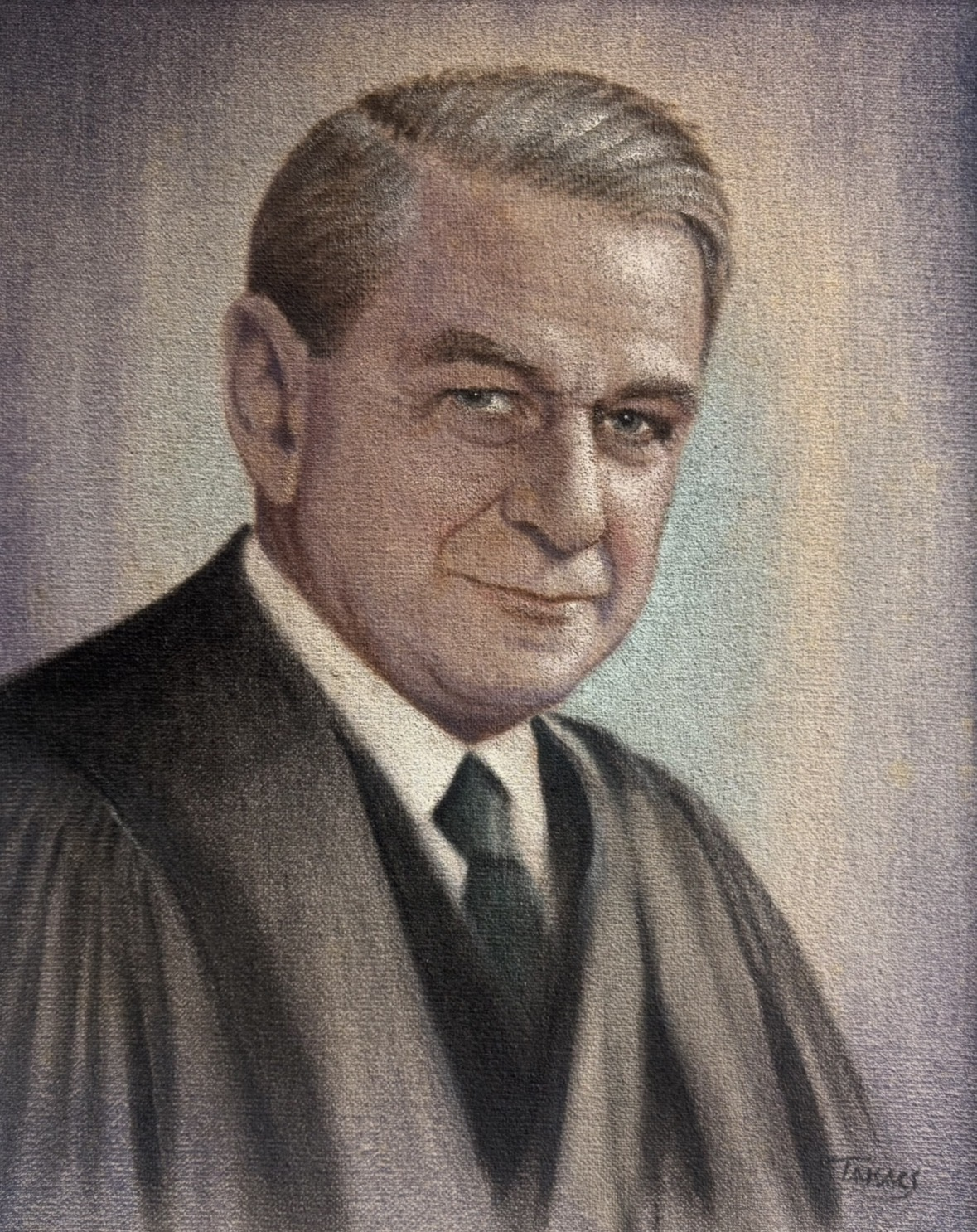
- Portrait of Judge Warren Leroy Jones

Senior Judge of the United States Court of Appeals for the Eleventh Circuit
- In office October 1, 1981 – November 11, 1993

Senior Judge of the United States Court of Appeals for the Fifth Circuit
- In office February 17, 1966 – October 1, 1981

Judge of the United States Court of Appeals for the Fifth Circuit
- In office April 21, 1955 – February 17, 1966
- Appointed by: Dwight D. Eisenhower
- Preceded by: Louie Willard Strum
- Succeeded by: David W. Dyer

Personal details
- Born: Warren Leroy Jones; July 2, 1895 Gordon, Nebraska
- Died: November 11, 1993 (aged 98) Jacksonville, Florida
- Party: Republican
- Education: University of Denver College of Law (LLB)

Warren Leroy Jones (July 2, 1895 – November 11, 1993) was a United States circuit judge of the United States Court of Appeals for the Fifth Circuit and the United States Court of Appeals for the Eleventh Circuit. On the Civil Rights-era Fifth Circuit, Judge Jones was the swing vote between the progressive "Four" and the segregationist, Southern-Senator-sponsored Cameron, Bell and Gewin, being close in philosophy to veteran Chief Judge Joseph Chappell Hutcheson Jr. and committed to following precedent.

== Education and career ==
Born in Gordon, Nebraska, Jones grew up in the Sandhills, a region that was rough and wild in the 1890s when he was born. In 1913 he moved to Van Tassel, Wyoming but two years later returned to Lincoln in his home state and served in the military during World War I.

In 1921, Jones moved to Colorado and received a Bachelor of Laws from the University of Denver College of Law in 1924. He was a deputy district attorney of Denver County, Colorado from 1922 to 1924, and was in private practice in Denver, Colorado in 1925. He then moved to Jacksonville, Florida where he became a prominent attorney and bank president who studied Abraham Lincoln. Jones remained in Jacksonville until 1955, and became president of the Jacksonville Bar Association in 1939, and of the Florida Bar Association in 1944. He missed out on a judicial position for the United States District Court for the Southern District of Florida during the early 1950s, but in 1954 journals from Jacksonville would back Jones for a new seat on the busy Fifth Circuit, and five months later after the death of Judge Louie Willard Strum, Florida's re-developing Republican Party backed Jones for Strum's seat.

== Federal judicial service ==
Jones was nominated by President Dwight D. Eisenhower on March 4, 1955, to a seat on the United States Court of Appeals for the Fifth Circuit. He was confirmed by the United States Senate on April 19, 1955, and received his commission on April 21, 1955.

Although lacking patience for those who sought to avoid the integration of educational facilities, and almost always voting to desegregate schools, Jones held a much more "passive" view of the recent Brown v. Board of Education case than John Robert Brown or Elbert Tuttle: for instance, he would demand evidence segregation caused harm to students before advocating that it be forced.

He also had much less deep interest in segregation cases than his fellow judges on the Court. Judge Jones would sit in critical Dallas and New Orleans school desegregation cases without writing an opinion, although here and in Louisiana's St. Helena and Bossier Parish he would support Tuttle, Wisdom and Brown is demanding previously blocked desegregation in the first few years of the 1960s. The few opinions he did write were simple and direct.

Jones' somewhat conservative public reputation was primarily due to having voted along with the circuit's conservative judges in favor of a jury trial in the famous contempt case against then-governor of Mississippi, Ross Barnett. Nonetheless, in Meredith v. Fair, Jones had joined with the "Four" enjoining Barnett to admit Meredith.

He assumed senior status on February 17, 1966. Jones was reassigned by operation of law to the United States Court of Appeals for the Eleventh Circuit on October 1, 1981, pursuant to 94 Stat. 1994. His service terminated on November 11, 1993, due to his death in Jacksonville.

== Sources ==
Legal offices
Preceded by Louie Willard Strum	Judge of the United States Court of Appeals for the Fifth Circuit; 1955–1966	Succeeded by David W. Dyer
