= Judge Batts =

Judge Batts may refer to:

- Deborah Batts (1947–2020), judge of the United States District Court for the Southern District of New York
- R. L. Batts (1864–1935), judge of the United States Court of Appeals for the Fifth Circuit
