= Wayne G. Borah =

American judge (1891–1966)

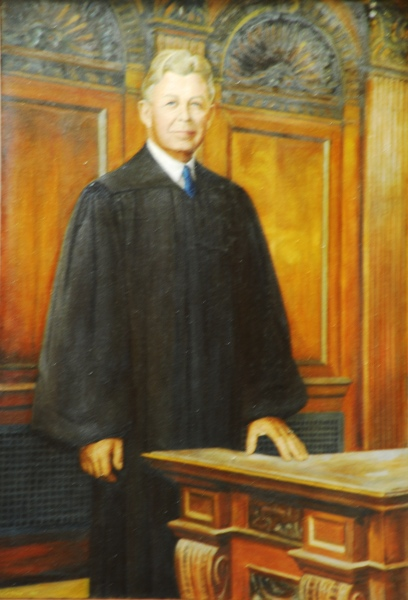

Senior Judge of the United States Court of Appeals for the Fifth Circuit
- In office December 31, 1956 – February 6, 1966

Judge of the United States Court of Appeals for the Fifth Circuit
- In office October 21, 1949 – December 31, 1956
- Appointed by: Harry S. Truman
- Preceded by: Elmo Pearce Lee
- Succeeded by: John Minor Wisdom

Judge of the United States District Court for the Eastern District of Louisiana
- In office October 3, 1928 – October 23, 1949
- Appointed by: Calvin Coolidge
- Preceded by: Louis Henry Burns
- Succeeded by: J. Skelly Wright

Personal details
- Born: Wayne G. Borah; April 28, 1891 Baldwin, Louisiana, U.S.
- Died: February 6, 1966 (aged 74)
- Education: Paul M. Hebert Law Center (LLB)

Wayne G. Borah (April 28, 1891 – February 6, 1966) was a United States circuit judge of the United States Court of Appeals for the Fifth Circuit and previously was a United States district judge of the United States District Court for the Eastern District of Louisiana.

== Education and career ==
Born in Baldwin, Louisiana, Borah received a Bachelor of Laws from the Paul M. Hebert Law Center at Louisiana State University in 1915. He was in private practice in New Orleans, Louisiana from 1915 to 1917. He was a United States Army captain in the infantry during World War I from 1917 to 1919. Afterwards, he returned to his private practice until 1923. He was an Assistant United States Attorney for the Eastern District of Louisiana from 1923 to 1925, and then became the United States Attorney for that district until 1928.

== Federal judicial service ==
Borah received a recess appointment from President Calvin Coolidge on October 3, 1928, to a seat on the United States District Court for the Eastern District of Louisiana vacated by Judge Louis Henry Burns. He was nominated to the same position by President Coolidge on December 6, 1928. He was confirmed by the United States Senate on December 17, 1928, and received his commission the same day. His service terminated on October 23, 1949, due to his elevation to the Fifth Circuit.

Borah was nominated by President Harry S. Truman on October 15, 1949, to a seat on the United States Court of Appeals for the Fifth Circuit vacated by Judge Elmo Pearce Lee. He was confirmed by the Senate on October 19, 1949, and received his commission on October 21, 1949. He assumed senior status on December 31, 1956. His service terminated on February 6, 1966, due to his death.

Legal offices
Preceded by Louis Henry Burns	Judge of the United States District Court for the Eastern District of Louisiana; 1928–1949	Succeeded by J. Skelly Wright
Preceded by Elmo Pearce Lee	Judge of the United States Court of Appeals for the Fifth Circuit; 1949–1956	Succeeded by John Minor Wisdom
