= John B. Rector =

American judge (1837–1898)

Judge of the United States District Court for the Northern District of Texas
- In office March 28, 1892 – April 9, 1898
- Appointed by: Benjamin Harrison
- Preceded by: Andrew Phelps McCormick
- Succeeded by: Seat abolished

Personal details
- Born: John B. Rector; November 24, 1837 Jackson County, Alabama
- Died: April 9, 1898 (aged 60) Dallas, Texas
- Education: Yale University read law

John B. Rector (November 24, 1837 – April 9, 1898) was a United States district judge of the United States District Court for the Northern District of Texas.

== Education and career ==
Born in Jackson County, Alabama, Rector graduated from Yale University in 1859 and read law to enter the bar in 1860. He entered private practice in Bastrop, Texas, interrupted by his service as a soldier in Terry's Texas Rangers during the American Civil War, beginning 1861. He was a district attorney of Travis County, Texas from 1866 to 1867, thereafter returning to private practice in Bastrop until 1871. He was a Judge of the 31st Judicial District of Texas from 1871 to 1876, when he again returned to private practice, in Austin, Texas.

== Run for Congress ==
Rector ran for election to the 49th Congress against Joseph D. Sayers in 1884 for the seat from Texas's 10th congressional district as an Independent. He received 12,253 votes, however, he lost to Sayers, the future Governor of Texas, by 9,270 votes. Lewis E. Daniell wrote that he was "perhaps the most popular Republican in the district".

== Federal judicial service ==
On March 24, 1892, Rector was nominated by President Benjamin Harrison to a seat on the United States District Court for the Northern District of Texas vacated by Judge Andrew Phelps McCormick. Rector was confirmed by the United States Senate on March 28, 1892, and received his commission the same day. Rector served in that capacity until his death on April 9, 1898, in Dallas, Texas.

== Sources ==
Legal offices
Preceded by Andrew Phelps McCormick	Judge of the United States District Court for the Northern District of Texas; 1892–1898	Succeeded by Seat abolished
