= Alvin Benjamin Rubin =

American judge (1920–1991)

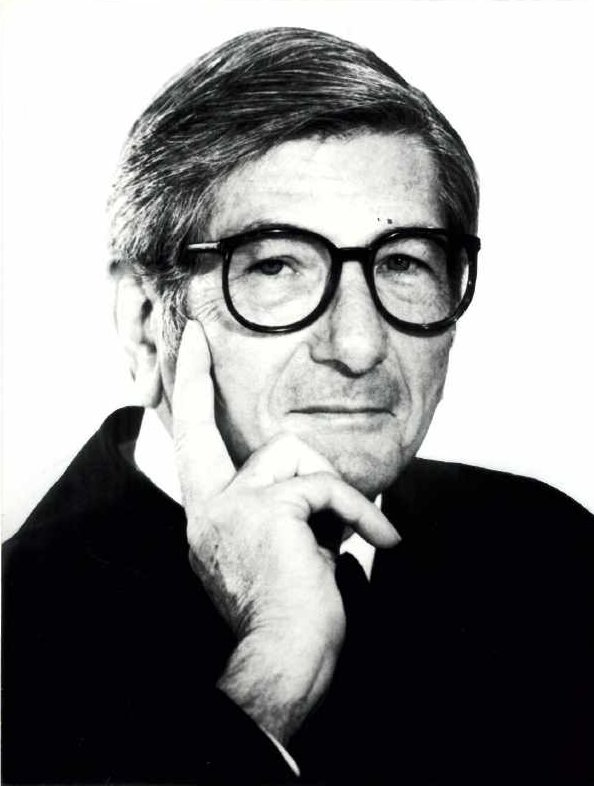

Senior Judge of the United States Court of Appeals for the Fifth Circuit
- In office July 1, 1989 – June 11, 1991

Judge of the United States Court of Appeals for the Fifth Circuit
- In office September 19, 1977 – July 1, 1989
- Appointed by: Jimmy Carter
- Preceded by: John Minor Wisdom
- Succeeded by: Rhesa Barksdale

Judge of the United States District Court for the Eastern District of Louisiana
- In office November 3, 1966 – October 8, 1977
- Appointed by: Lyndon B. Johnson
- Preceded by: Seat established by 80 Stat. 75
- Succeeded by: Robert Frederick Collins

Personal details
- Born: Alvin Benjamin Rubin; March 13, 1920 Alexandria, Louisiana, U.S.
- Died: June 11, 1991 (aged 71) Baton Rouge, Louisiana, U.S.
- Party: Democratic
- Education: Louisiana State University (BS, LLB)

Alvin Benjamin Rubin (March 13, 1920 – June 11, 1991) was a United States circuit judge of the United States Court of Appeals for the Fifth Circuit and previously a United States district judge of the United States District Court for the Eastern District of Louisiana.

== Education and career ==
Born in Alexandria in Rapides Parish in central Louisiana, Rubin received a Bachelor of Science degree from Louisiana State University at Baton Rouge in 1941 and a Bachelor of Laws from the Paul M. Hebert Law Center at Louisiana State University in 1942. He was in private practice in Louisiana from 1946 to 1966.

He started teaching as an adjunct law professor the year after he graduated from law school and taught continuously at LSU for over 46 years, in addition to lecturing at Harvard, Yale, the University of Chicago, and many other law schools.

== Federal judicial service ==
On August 16, 1966, Rubin was nominated by President Lyndon B. Johnson to a new seat on the United States District Court for the Eastern District of Louisiana created by 80 Stat. 75. He was confirmed by the United States Senate on October 20, 1966, and received his commission on November 3, 1966. Rubin served in that capacity until October 8, 1977, when he was elevated to the Fifth Circuit. One of his law clerks while he served on the district court was future United States Representative William Jefferson), the first African American to represent Louisiana in the United States House of Representatives since Reconstruction.

On August 16, 1977, President Jimmy Carter nominated Rubin to a seat on the United States Court of Appeals for the Fifth Circuit vacated by Judge John Minor Wisdom, a liberal Republican originally nominated by President Dwight D. Eisenhower. Rubin's elevation was confirmed by the Senate on September 16, 1977, and he received his commission three days thereafter. He assumed senior status on July 1, 1989, and served in that capacity until his death in Baton Rouge at the age of seventy-one.

Judge Rubin wrote hundreds of opinions, many of which continue to be cited by federal courts. One his famous passages is contained in U.S. v. McDaniels, 379 F.Supp. 1243 (E.D. La. 1974):

"However elusive the concept may be, there is a universal human feeling, not confined to philosophers, lawyers, or judges, that there is a quality known as justice, and that it is the aim of legal institutions to achieve it. The Constitution invokes that sense and sentiment in its first purposive phrase: it is ordained ‘to establish justice’. Madison, writing in Federalist No. 51, called it ‘the end of civil society. It ever has been and ever will be pursued until it be obtained, or until liberty be lost in the pursuit.’ This feeling that justice is a supreme goal, this sense that it is a predicate to organized society, is no mere yearning, for it is only in a fair proceeding, one that comports with our sense of justice, that we can with any legitimacy call another human being to account.

Justice must not only be done; it must be seen to be done. The interest of justice requires more than a proceeding that reaches an objectively accurate result; trial by ordeal might by sheer chance accomplish that. It requires a proceeding that, by its obvious fairness, helps to justify itself."

== Personal ==
Rubin was Jewish.

In 1992, the Louisiana Law Review devoted its entire edition to Judge Rubin with articles about him written by, among others, Justice Byron White (U.S. Supreme Court), Judge John Minor Wisdom (U.S. Fifth Circuit), Judge Henry A. Politz (U.S. Fifth Circuit) and many others.

== See also ==
- List of Jewish American jurists

== Sources ==
Legal offices
Preceded by Seat established by 80 Stat. 75	Judge of the United States District Court for the Eastern District of Louisiana; 1966–1977	Succeeded by Robert Frederick Collins
Preceded by John Minor Wisdom	Judge of the United States Court of Appeals for the Fifth Circuit; 1977–1989	Succeeded by Rhesa Barksdale
