= Curtis L. Waller =

American judge (1887–1950)

Judge of the United States Court of Appeals for the Fifth Circuit
- In office March 10, 1943 – July 11, 1950
- Appointed by: Franklin D. Roosevelt
- Preceded by: Seat established by 56 Stat. 1050
- Succeeded by: Louie Willard Strum

Judge of the United States District Court for the Northern District of Florida Judge of the United States District Court for the Southern District of Florida
- In office June 19, 1940 – March 12, 1943
- Appointed by: Franklin D. Roosevelt
- Preceded by: Seat established by 54 Stat. 219
- Succeeded by: Dozier A. DeVane

Member of the Mississippi House of Representatives from the Hancock County district
- In office January 1924 – 1925
- Succeeded by: Robert L. Genin

Personal details
- Born: Curtis Longino Waller; January 9, 1887 Silver Creek, Mississippi
- Died: July 11, 1950 (aged 63)
- Education: Mississippi College (PhB); Millsaps College (LLB)

Curtis Longino Waller (January 9, 1887 – July 11, 1950) was a United States circuit judge of the United States Court of Appeals for the Fifth Circuit and previously was a United States district judge of the United States District Court for the Northern District of Florida and the United States District Court for the Southern District of Florida.

== Education and career ==
Born in Silver Creek, Mississippi, Waller received his Bachelor of Philosophy degree from Mississippi College in 1908 and his Bachelor of Laws from Millsaps College in 1910. Waller was a private secretary to United States Representative Pat Harrison in 1911. He was in private practice in Bay St. Louis, Mississippi from 1914 to 1927, and was a United States Army lieutenant colonel in World War I. Waller served as a member of the Mississippi House of Representatives in 1924. He resigned in 1925. Waller relocated to Florida and was in private practice in Tallahassee from 1930 to 1940. Waller was a state's attorney for the Florida 2nd Judicial Circuit in 1932 and a member of the Florida House of Representatives in 1933. Waller established, with Claude Pepper, the law firm of Waller and Pepper.

== Federal judicial service ==
Waller was nominated by President Franklin D. Roosevelt on June 11, 1940, to the United States District Court for the Northern District of Florida and the United States District Court for the Southern District of Florida, to a new joint seat authorized by 54 Stat. 219. He was confirmed by the United States Senate on June 15, 1940, and received his commission on June 19, 1940. His service terminated on March 12, 1943, due to his elevation to the Fifth Circuit.

Waller was nominated by President Roosevelt on February 18, 1943, to the United States Court of Appeals for the Fifth Circuit, to a new seat authorized by 56 Stat. 1050. He was confirmed by the Senate on March 9, 1943, and received his commission on March 10, 1943. His service terminated on July 11, 1950, due to his death.

== Honor ==
The west front of the Florida State Capitol is designated as Waller Park in Waller's memory.

== Sources ==
Legal offices
Preceded by Seat established by 54 Stat. 219	Judge of the United States District Court for the Northern District of Florida; Judge of the United States District Court for the Southern District of Florida; 1940–1943	Succeeded by Dozier A. DeVane
Preceded by Seat established by 56 Stat. 1050	Judge of the United States Court of Appeals for the Fifth Circuit; 1943–1950	Succeeded by Louie Willard Strum
