= G. Harrold Carswell =

American judge (1919–1992)

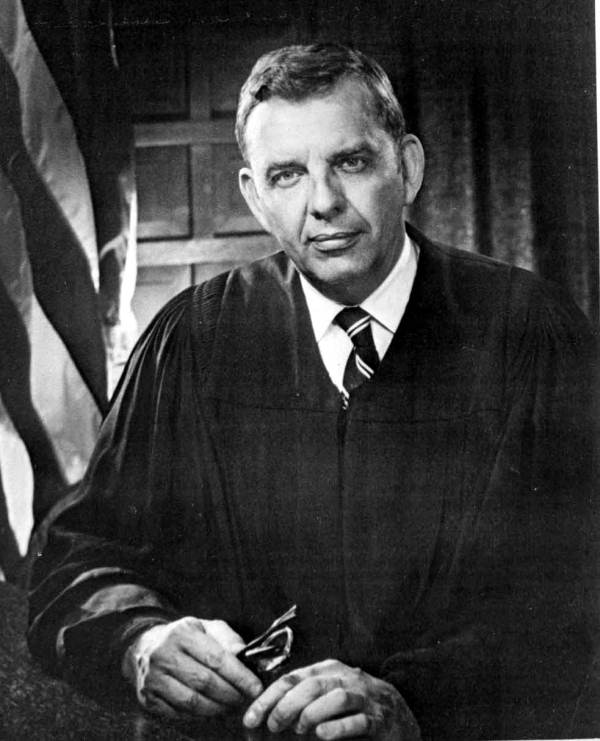

Judge of the United States Court of Appeals for the Fifth Circuit
- In office June 20, 1969 – April 20, 1970
- Appointed by: Richard Nixon
- Preceded by: Seat established by 82 Stat. 184
- Succeeded by: Paul Hitch Roney

Chief Judge of the United States District Court for the Northern District of Florida
- In office April 10, 1958 – June 27, 1969
- Preceded by: Dozier A. DeVane
- Succeeded by: Winston Arnow

Judge of the United States District Court for the Northern District of Florida
- In office April 10, 1958 – June 27, 1969
- Appointed by: Dwight D. Eisenhower
- Preceded by: Dozier A. DeVane
- Succeeded by: David Lycurgus Middlebrooks Jr.

United States Attorney for the Northern District of Florida
- In office March 1, 1953 – April 9, 1958
- Appointed by: Dwight D. Eisenhower
- Preceded by: George E. Hoffmann
- Succeeded by: Wilfred C. Varn

Personal details
- Born: George Harrold Carswell; December 22, 1919 Irwinton, Georgia, U.S.
- Died: July 13, 1992 (aged 72) Tallahassee, Florida, U.S.
- Party: Republican
- Education: Duke University (AB); Mercer University (LLB)

Military service
- Branch/service: United States Navy
- Rank: Lieutenant
- Unit: U.S. Naval Reserve
- Battles/wars: World War II

George Harrold Carswell (December 22, 1919 – July 13, 1992) was a United States circuit judge of the United States Court of Appeals for the Fifth Circuit and a United States district judge of the United States District Court for the Northern District of Florida. He was also an unsuccessful nominee to the United States Supreme Court in 1970.

== Education and career ==
Carswell was born in Irwinton, Wilkinson County, Georgia. He graduated from Duke University with an Artium Baccalaureus degree in 1941 and briefly attended the University of Georgia School of Law before joining the United States Navy at the beginning of World War II. Carswell did six months of postgraduate work at the United States Naval Academy and served in the Pacific aboard the heavy cruiser USS Baltimore (CA-68) as a lieutenant in the United States Naval Reserve; he was discharged in 1945 (when the war ended). Carswell graduated with a Bachelor of Laws from the Walter F. George School of Law at Mercer University in 1948. Griffin Bell, 72nd Attorney General of the United States, was one of Carswell's classmates at Mercer. Carswell unsuccessfully ran for a seat in the Georgia legislature in the fall of 1948. He then moved to Tallahassee, Florida, where he worked as a private attorney from 1948 to 1953. In 1953, he was appointed United States Attorney for the Northern District of Florida by President Dwight D. Eisenhower; Carswell served in this position until 1958.

=== Personal life ===
Carswell married his wife Virginia (née Simmons) in 1944.

== Federal judicial service ==
Carswell was nominated by President Dwight D. Eisenhower on March 6, 1958, to a seat on the United States District Court for the Northern District of Florida vacated by Judge Dozier A. DeVane. He was confirmed by the United States Senate on March 31, 1958, and received his commission on April 10, 1958. He served as Chief Judge from 1958 to 1969. His service terminated on June 27, 1969, due to his elevation to the Fifth Circuit.

Carswell was nominated by President Richard Nixon on May 12, 1969, to the United States Court of Appeals for the Fifth Circuit, to a new seat authorized by 82 Stat. 184. He was confirmed by the Senate on June 19, 1969, and received his commission on June 20, 1969. His service terminated on April 20, 1970, due to his resignation.

== Supreme Court nomination ==
On January 19, 1970, President Nixon nominated Carswell to be an associate justice of the United States Supreme Court to replace Abe Fortas, who had resigned in May 1969. Nixon had earlier nominated Clement Haynsworth to succeed Fortas, but the nomination was rejected by the U.S. Senate.

The Senate Judiciary Committee opened hearings on the nomination eight days after Nixon made the announcement; and the president anticipated that the nomination would proceed smoothly. Before they began, however, the press uncovered a speech delivered by Carswell during his unsuccessful Georgia legislative bid in 1948 that espoused the principles of white supremacy. In the August 2, 1948 speech to the American Legion chapter at Gordon, Georgia, he said:

I am Southern by ancestry, birth, training, inclination, belief and practice. And I believe that segregation of the races is proper and the only practical and correct way of life in our states. I have always so believed and I shall always so act.

I shall be the last to submit to any attempt on the part of anyone to break down and to weaken this firmly established policy of our people.

If my own brother were to advocate such a program, I would be compelled to take issue with him and to oppose him to the limit of my ability.

I yield to no man, as a fellow candidate or as a fellow citizen, in the firm, vigorous belief in the principles of white supremacy, and I shall always be so governed.

When the story broke, Carswell said "specifically and categorically, I renounce and reject the words themselves and the thought they represent; they are abhorrent." The NAACP, upon learning of Carswell's racist comments, declared their opposition to Carswell's nomination and asked that his appointment be rejected by the Senate. U.S. Attorney General John Mitchell, citing an extensive background check by the Justice Department, was willing to forgive, stating that it was unfair to criticize Carswell for "political remarks made 22 years ago".

Other issues regarding Carswell's civil rights record soon also came to light, such as his being involved in turning a public golf course into a segregated private club in Tallahassee, Florida, signing a deed to property which contained a racially restrictive covenant and prolonging the duration of a school desegregation case from 1963 to 1967.

Meanwhile, feminists accused him of being an opponent of women's rights. Various women, including U.S. Congresswoman Patsy Mink and Betty Friedan, testified before the Senate, opposed his nomination. They described a case in which Judge Carswell refused a rehearing for a complainant who was the mother of preschool children.

During the hearings, concerns about Carswell's mediocre skill as a jurist were raised as well. By one assessment, it was reported, 40 percent of his rulings had been overturned on appeal. Louis H. Pollak, then dean of Yale Law School, testified that "there is nothing in these opinions that suggests more than at very best a level of modest competence, no more than that." Senator George McGovern of South Dakota said that "I find his record to be distinguished largely by two qualities: racism and mediocrity." In response, Senator Roman Hruska of Nebraska suggested that critics were focusing on Carswell's scholarship because they didn't like that he was a Southerner. Later, Hruska famously told reporters:

Even if he were mediocre, there are a lot of mediocre judges and people and lawyers. They are entitled to a little representation, aren't they, and a little chance? We can't have all Brandeises, Frankfurters and Cardozos.

The remark was criticized by many as being anti-semitic, which further damaged Carswell's cause.

Despite the testimony given about his civil rights record, on February 16, 1970, the Judiciary Committee voted 13–4 to forward the nomination to the full Senate with a favorable recommendation. After opponents of Carswell failed, by a 44–52 vote, to return the nomination to the Judiciary committee for further review on April 6, the Senate rejected Carswell's nomination on April 8, 1970, by a 45–51 vote, with 13 Republicans joining 38 Democrats in voting "no".

Between the rejections of Haynsworth and of Carswell, the Senate rejected two of a single president's Supreme Court nominees. Before Nixon, the Senate had not done so since Grover Cleveland in 1893–94. As a result, President Nixon accused Democrats of having an anti-Southern bias, saying: "... the real reason for their rejection was their legal philosophy, a philosophy that I share, of strict construction of the Constitution, and also the accident of their birth, the fact that they were born in the South ... I understand the bitter feelings of millions of Americans who live in the South about the act of regional discrimination that took place in the Senate yesterday." Later that April, the president nominated Midwestern judge Harry Blackmun to fill the Fortas vacancy. He was later confirmed in a 94–0 vote on May 12.

== U.S. Senate campaign ==
On April 20, 1970, Carswell resigned from his judicial position to run for the Republican nomination for the U.S. Senate from Florida. His opponent was U.S. Representative William C. Cramer of St. Petersburg. Expecting to benefit politically in Florida from the rejection of Judge Carswell to the Supreme Court, aides of either Governor Claude R. Kirk, Jr., or U.S. Senator Edward Gurney of Winter Park urged Carswell to resign from the bench to run for the Senate seat being vacated by the long-term Democrat Spessard Holland. Cramer claimed that Gurney had in a 1968 gentlemen's agreement agreed to support him for the seat. Gurney declined to discuss the gentlemen's agreement with Cramer but said that he and Cramer, who had been House colleagues, had "totally different opinions on this. That is ancient history, and I see no point in reviving things. … If I told my complete version of the matter, Cramer would not believe me, and I don't want Bill angry at me." Gurney claimed that he was unaware that Cramer had considered running for the Senate in 1968 and had deferred that year to Gurney, with the expectation that Cramer would seek the other Senate seat in 1970 with Gurney's backing.

When Kirk and Gurney endorsed Carswell, Lieutenant Governor Ray Osborne, a Kirk appointee, abandoned his own primary challenge to Cramer. Years later, Kirk said that he "should have stuck with Osborne", later an attorney from Boca Raton, and not encouraged Carswell to run. Kirk also said that he had not "created" Carswell's candidacy, as the media had depicted.

Carswell said that he ran for the Senate because he wanted to "confront the liberals who shot me down" but denied that Kirk took advantage of the failed confirmation to thwart Cramer. "... Neither then nor now did I feel used. ... What feud they had was their own." Carswell said that he had no knowledge of a gentlemen's agreement between Gurney and Cramer and had considered running for the Senate even before he was nominated to the Supreme Court.

Carswell instead blamed his loss on the "dark evil winds of liberalism" and the "northern press and its knee-jerking followers in the Senate".

Carswell reported that U.S. Representative Rogers Clark Ballard Morton of Maryland, who was also in 1970 the Republican national chairman, had told him that he believed Carswell was "clearly electable" and that Cramer should not risk the loss of a House seat that had been in Republican hands since 1955. Cramer, however, claimed that Morton had termed the intraparty machinations against Cramer the worst "double crosses" that Morton had ever witnessed in the party. President Nixon sat out the Carswell-Cramer primary even though in 1969 he had strongly urged Cramer to enter the race. Deputy Press Secretary Gerald Lee Warren said that Nixon had "no knowledge and no involvement" in Carswell's candidacy.

Gurney claimed that Harry S. Dent, Sr., a South Carolina political consultant with ties to Republican U.S. Senator Strom Thurmond of South Carolina, had urged Carswell to run. Carswell further secured endorsements from actors John Wayne and Gene Autry and retained Richard Viguerie, the direct mail specialist from Falls Church, Virginia, to raise funds.

Cramer defeated Carswell, 220,553 to 121,281. A third contender, businessman George Balmer, received the remaining 10,947 votes. Thereafter, Cramer was defeated, 54%–46%, by the Democrat Lawton Chiles of Lakeland in a Democratic year.

Senate Republican Leader Hugh Scott of Pennsylvania, who opposed Carswell's confirmation to the Supreme Court, said that Carswell "was asking for it, and he got what he deserved".

== Later years ==
In 1976, Carswell pled guilty to battery for advances he made to an undercover police officer in a Tallahassee men's room. Then, in September 1979, Carswell was attacked and beaten by a man whom he had invited to his Atlanta, Georgia, hotel room in similar circumstances. Until these incidents there had been no public talk of Carswell's sexuality.

Carswell subsequently returned to his private law practice before retiring. He died in 1992 of lung cancer; his wife, Virginia, died in 2009.

== See also ==
- Unsuccessful nominations to the Supreme Court of the United States
- George L. Thurston III

== Sources ==
Legal offices
Preceded by George E. Hoffmann	United States Attorney for the Northern District of Florida; 1953–1958	Succeeded by Wilfred C. Varn
Preceded by Dozier A. DeVane	Judge of the United States District Court for the Northern District of Florida; 1958–1969	Succeeded by David Lycurgus Middlebrooks Jr.
Preceded by Dozier A. DeVane	Chief Judge of the United States District Court for the Northern District of Florida; 1958–1969	Succeeded by Winston Arnow
Preceded by Seat established by 82 Stat. 184	Judge of the United States Court of Appeals for the Fifth Circuit; 1969–1970	Succeeded by Paul Hitch Roney
