= Louie Willard Strum =

American judge (1890–1954)

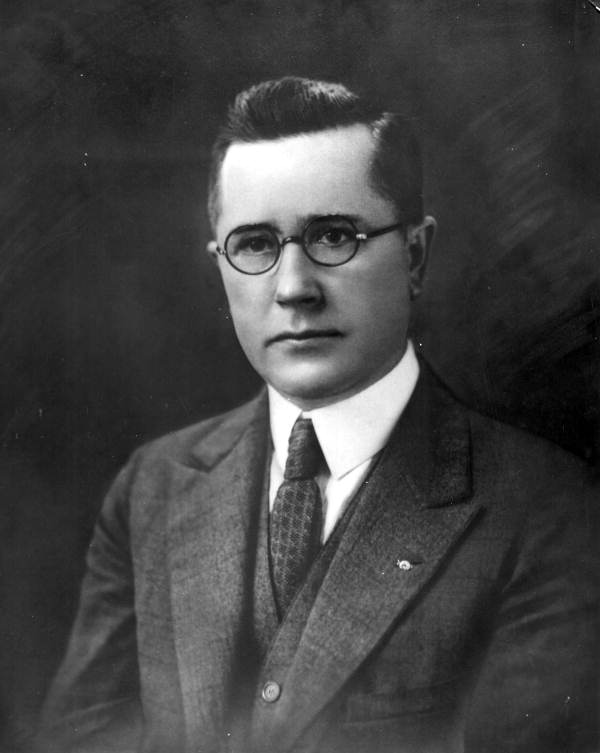
- Strum in 1925

Judge of the United States Court of Appeals for the Fifth Circuit
- In office September 26, 1950 – July 26, 1954
- Appointed by: Harry S. Truman
- Preceded by: Curtis L. Waller
- Succeeded by: Warren Leroy Jones

Chief Judge of the United States District Court for the Southern District of Florida
- In office 1948–1950
- Preceded by: Office established
- Succeeded by: John W. Holland

Judge of the United States District Court for the Southern District of Florida
- In office March 2, 1931 – October 3, 1950
- Appointed by: Herbert Hoover
- Preceded by: Seat established by 46 Stat. 820
- Succeeded by: John Milton Bryan Simpson

Personal details
- Born: Louie Willard Strum; January 16, 1890 Valdosta, Georgia
- Died: July 26, 1954 (aged 64)
- Education: Stetson University College of Law (LLB)

Louie Willard Strum (January 16, 1890 – July 26, 1954) was a United States circuit judge of the United States Court of Appeals for the Fifth Circuit and previously was a United States district judge of the United States District Court for the Southern District of Florida.

== Education and career ==
Born in Valdosta, Georgia, Strum received a Bachelor of Laws from Stetson University College of Law in 1912. He was in the United States Navy from 1906 to 1910. He was in private practice of law in Jacksonville, Florida from 1912 to 1925. He was in the United States Navy as Lieutenant Commander during World War I from 1917 to 1919. He was an assistant attorney of Jacksonville from 1921 to 1923. He was city attorney of Jacksonville from 1923 to 1925. He was a justice of the Supreme Court of Florida from 1925 to 1931, serving as chief justice in 1931.

== Federal judicial service ==
Strum was nominated by President Herbert Hoover on February 21, 1931, to the United States District Court for the Southern District of Florida, to a new seat created by 46 Stat. 820. He was confirmed by the United States Senate on February 28, 1931, and received his commission on March 2, 1931. He served as Chief Judge from 1948 to 1950. His service was terminated on October 3, 1950, due to his elevation to the Fifth Circuit.

Strum was nominated by President Harry S. Truman on September 14, 1950, to a seat on the United States Court of Appeals for the Fifth Circuit vacated by Judge Curtis L. Waller. He was confirmed by the Senate on September 23, 1950, and received his commission on September 26, 1950. His service was terminated on July 26, 1954, due to his death.

== Sources ==
Legal offices
Preceded by Seat established by 46 Stat. 820	Judge of the United States District Court for the Southern District of Florida; 1931–1950	Succeeded by John Milton Bryan Simpson
Preceded by Office established	Chief Judge of the United States District Court for the Southern District of Florida; 1948–1950	Succeeded by John W. Holland
Preceded by Curtis L. Waller	Judge of the United States Court of Appeals for the Fifth Circuit; 1950–1954	Succeeded by Warren Leroy Jones
