= Elmo Pearce Lee =

American judge (1882–1949)

Judge of the United States Court of Appeals for the Fifth Circuit
- In office December 17, 1943 – July 26, 1949
- Appointed by: Franklin D. Roosevelt
- Preceded by: Rufus Edward Foster
- Succeeded by: Wayne G. Borah

Personal details
- Born: Elmo Pearce Lee; February 10, 1882 Coushatta, Louisiana, U.S.
- Died: July 26, 1949 (aged 67)
- Education: Paul M. Hebert Law Center (LLB)

Elmo Pearce Lee (February 10, 1882 – July 26, 1949) was a United States circuit judge of the United States Court of Appeals for the Fifth Circuit.

== Education and career ==
Born in Coushatta, Louisiana, Lee received a Bachelor of Laws from the Paul M. Hebert Law Center at Louisiana State University in 1911. He was in private practice in Mansfield, Louisiana from 1911 to 1928, and in Shreveport, Louisiana from 1928 to 1943.

== Federal judicial service ==
Lee was nominated by President Franklin D. Roosevelt on November 5, 1943, to a seat on the United States Court of Appeals for the Fifth Circuit vacated by Judge Rufus Edward Foster. He was confirmed by the United States Senate on November 30, 1943, and received his commission on December 17, 1943. Lee died in office on July 26, 1949.

== Sources ==
Legal offices
Preceded by Rufus Edward Foster	Judge of the United States Court of Appeals for the Fifth Circuit; 1943–1949	Succeeded by Wayne G. Borah
