= Rhesa Barksdale =

American judge (born 1944)

Senior Judge of the United States Court of Appeals for the Fifth Circuit
- Incumbent
- Assumed office August 8, 2009

Judge of the United States Court of Appeals for the Fifth Circuit
- In office March 12, 1990 – August 8, 2009
- Appointed by: George H. W. Bush
- Preceded by: Alvin Benjamin Rubin
- Succeeded by: James E. Graves Jr.

Personal details
- Born: Rhesa Hawkins Barksdale; August 8, 1944 (age 81) Jackson, Mississippi, U.S.
- Education: United States Military Academy (BS); University of Mississippi (JD)

Rhesa Hawkins Barksdale (born August 8, 1944) is a senior United States circuit judge of the United States Court of Appeals for the Fifth Circuit.

== Early life, education and legal training ==
Born in Jackson, Mississippi, Barksdale received a Bachelor of Science degree from United States Military Academy at West Point in 1966. He was in the United States Army from 1966 to 1970, serving in the Vietnam War, and afterwards returned to studies. In 1972, he received a Juris Doctor from the University of Mississippi Law School, where he graduated first in his class and was a member of the Mississippi Mayes Inn of the Phi Delta Phi legal fraternity. He was a law clerk for Justice Byron White of the United States Supreme Court from 1972 to 1973.

== Career ==
Barksdale entered the private practice of law, as an attorney for the firm of Butler, Snow, O'Mara, Stevens and Cannada in Jackson from 1973 to 1990. During this time, he was an instructor in constitutional law for the University of Mississippi Law School Paralegal Course in 1975 and 1976, and an instructor in the Mississippi College School of Law in 1976. He was a Chairman, Mississippi Vietnam Veterans Leadership Program from 1982 to 1985.

== Federal judicial service ==
On November 17, 1989, President George H. W. Bush nominated Barksdale to a seat on the United States Court of Appeals for the Fifth Circuit vacated by Judge Alvin Benjamin Rubin. Barksdale was confirmed by the United States Senate on March 9, 1990, and received his commission on March 12, 1990. Barksdale took senior status on August 8, 2009.

== Personal life ==
A resident of Jackson, Mississippi, Barksdale is the brother of former Netscape Communications Corporation CEO Jim Barksdale.

== See also ==
- List of law clerks for the sixth seat of the Supreme Court of the United States

== Notes ==
Legal offices
Preceded by Alvin Benjamin Rubin	Judge of the United States Court of Appeals for the Fifth Circuit; 1990–2009	Succeeded by James E. Graves Jr.
