= Barry Sullivan (lawyer) =

American lawyer

Barry Sullivan is a Chicago lawyer, Professor of Law and holder of the Cooney & Conway Chair in Advocacy at Loyola University Chicago School of Law.

== Education ==
Sullivan attended Middlebury College in Vermont where he graduated in 1970 with a A.B. degree with high honors in philosophy and political science. While at Middlebury he was a member of the Phi Beta Kappa Society. In 1974 he graduated from the University of Chicago Law School, where he was an associate editor of the Law Review and a national honor scholar.

== Legal career ==
Sullivan began his legal career in New Orleans, Louisiana as a law clerk for Judge John Minor Wisdom of the United States Court of Appeals for the Fifth Circuit. In 1976 he joined the law firm Jenner & Block in their Chicago office and was promoted to partner in 1981.

Sullivan primary focus was constitutional, administrative and private law issues. He was very active in Appellate and Supreme Court litigation. Sulivan also served as an assistant to the Solicitor General of the United States in 1980 and 1981.

== Education career ==
In 1994 Sullivan accepted the position of dean of the Washington and Lee University School of Law. In addition, in 1998 and 1999 he served as vice president of the university. Sullivan has held a number of other academic positions including Senior Lecturer in the Irving B. Harris Graduate School of Public Policy Studies at the University of Chicago, a visiting professor of law at Northwestern University School of Law, and a visiting law fellow of the University of London. He is the holder of the Cooney & Conway Chair in Advocacy at Loyola University Chicago School of Law.

Sullivan has done extensive academic writing in the areas of administrative and constitutional law, employment law, appellate practice, and the legal profession. His work has appeared in many journals in the United States and Europe including Northwestern Law Review, the Notre Dame Law Review, the Yale Law Journal, the Warsaw University Law Review, and the University of Chicago Law Review. Sullivan is a "Life Member" of the American Law Institute.

== Professional organizations ==
Sullivan has been very active in the American Bar Association serving as chair, Coordinating Committee on AIDS, 1988–1994; chair, Committee on Professionalism, 1999–2000; co-chair, Amicus Briefs Committee, 2002–2004; co-chair, Bill of Rights Committee, 2002–present and as a member of numerous other committees and sections. He also served as vice-chairman on the Committee on the Administration of Justice in the Seventh Circuit Bar Association from 1985 to 1986.

Sullivan is a member of the visiting committee to the Irving B. Harris Graduate School of Public Policy Studies of the University of Chicago, of the Advisory Board of the International Human Rights Institute of DePaul University, and of the National Advisory Board of the Center for Religion, the Professions and the Public at the University of Missouri, and of the Board of Visitors of Southern Illinois University School of Law. He is a member of the Fellows of Phi Beta Kappa and of the American Bar Foundation. He was a trustee of Catholic Theological Union from 1993 to 2003, a member of the visiting committee to the University of Chicago Divinity School from 1987 to 2001, and a member of the board of the University of Chicago’s Court Theatre from 2003 to 2005.

== Publications ==
Sullivan has published a number of professional and academic works in both the United States and Europe in journals such as "The Trial Lawyers Guide", "Dublin University Law Journal", West Virginia Law Review, and Warsaw University Law Review.

== Community ==
In 1995 and 1996 Sullivan was a Consultant to the Government of Ireland for the Commission on the Status of People With Disabilities. During the period 2003-2005, he was a member of the Board of Trustees of Court Theatre at University of Chicago. Sullivan was also a member of the Legal Review and Advisory Panel of the National Leadership Coalition on AIDS from 1992 to 1998.
