= Robert Frederick Collins =

American judge

Robert Collins

Judge of the United States District Court for the Eastern District of Louisiana
- In office May 19, 1978 – August 6, 1993
- Appointed by: Jimmy Carter
- Preceded by: Alvin Benjamin Rubin
- Succeeded by: Thomas Porteous

Personal details
- Born: Robert Frederick Collins; January 27, 1931 (age 95) New Orleans, Louisiana, U.S.
- Education: Dillard University (BA); Louisiana State University (LLB)

Robert Frederick Collins (born January 27, 1931) is a former civil rights attorney and former United States district judge of the United States District Court for the Eastern District of Louisiana.

== Education and career ==
Collins was born in New Orleans, Louisiana and graduated from Gilbert Academy. He received a Bachelor of Arts degree from Dillard University in 1951 and a Bachelor of Laws from Paul M. Hebert Law Center at Louisiana State University where he was one of the first three African American students admitted in 1954. He was in the United States Army from 1954 to 1956, thereafter entering private practice in New Orleans from 1956 to 1972. He was also an instructor at Southern University Law Center in Baton Rouge from 1959 to 1961. He was a magistrate judge for the Criminal District Court of New Orleans from 1972 to 1978.

== Federal judicial service ==
On January 26, 1978, Collins was nominated by President Jimmy Carter to a seat on the United States District Court for the Eastern District of Louisiana vacated by Judge Alvin Benjamin Rubin. Collins was confirmed by the United States Senate on May 17, 1978, and received his commission on May 19, 1978, he served until his resignation on August 6, 1993.

== Conviction and resignation from office ==
In 1991, Collins was convicted of accepting money to influence his sentencing of a marijuana smuggler. He served five years in the Federal Prison Camp in Montgomery, Alabama and in other federal prisons. He was released November 21, 1997. After his conviction, Collins did not resign from his judgeship. Consequently, on May 19, 1993, United States Representative James Sensenbrenner of Wisconsin introduced H. RES. 176, impeaching Collins. It was referred to the House Judiciary Committee and died there. Later, in June, Jack Brooks tried again with H. RES. 207. Collins resigned on August 6, 1993, his impending impeachment hearings scheduled to begin the next day. As the result of his conviction, Collins was disbarred from the practice of law in Louisiana by the Supreme Court of Louisiana.

== Resources ==
- Warren, Robert Penn. Interview with Robert Frederick Collins, February 2, 1964 published in Who Speaks for the Negro? searchable transcript at Who Speaks for the Negro? Digital Archive of the Robert Penn Warren Center for the Humanities and the Jean and Alexander Heard Libraries at Vanderbilt University based on collections at University of Kentucky and Yale University Libraries.

== See also ==
- List of African-American federal judges
- List of African-American jurists
- List of first minority male lawyers and judges in the United States

Legal offices
Preceded by Alvin Benjamin Rubin	Judge of the United States District Court for the Eastern District of Louisiana; 1978–1993	Succeeded by Thomas Porteous
