= Dozier A. DeVane =

American judge (1883–1963)

Senior Judge of the United States District Court for the Northern District of Florida
- In office January 31, 1958 – December 15, 1963

Judge of the United States District Court for the Northern District of Florida
- In office April 22, 1943 – January 31, 1958
- Appointed by: Franklin D. Roosevelt
- Preceded by: Curtis L. Waller
- Succeeded by: G. Harrold Carswell

Judge of the United States District Court for the Southern District of Florida
- In office April 22, 1943 – October 1, 1947
- Appointed by: Franklin D. Roosevelt
- Preceded by: Curtis L. Waller
- Succeeded by: Seat abolished

Personal details
- Born: Dozier Adolphus DeVane; August 2, 1883 Lakeland, Florida
- Died: December 15, 1963 (aged 80)
- Education: Washington and Lee University; School of Law (LL.B.)

Dozier Adolphus DeVane (August 2, 1883 – December 15, 1963) was a United States district judge of the United States District Court for the Northern District of Florida and the United States District Court for the Southern District of Florida.

== Education and career ==
Born on August 2, 1883, near Lakeland, Florida, DeVane received a Bachelor of Laws in 1908 from the Washington and Lee University School of Law. He entered private practice in Tampa, Florida from 1908 to 1918. He was county attorney for Hillsborough County, Florida from 1913 to 1914. He was counsel for the Florida Railroad Commission (now the Florida Public Service Commission) from 1918 to 1920. He was a rate attorney for AT&T from 1920 to 1922. He was an associate and general counsel for the Chesapeake and Potomac Telephone Co. from 1922 to 1930. He returned to private practice in Washington, D.C. from 1930 to 1933. He was a solicitor for the Federal Power Commission from 1933 to 1938. He returned to private practice in Orlando, Florida from 1938 to 1943.

== Federal judicial service ==
DeVane was nominated by President Franklin D. Roosevelt on March 26, 1943, to a joint seat on the United States District Court for the Northern District of Florida and the United States District Court for the Southern District of Florida vacated by Judge Curtis L. Waller. He was confirmed by the United States Senate on April 14, 1943, and received his commission on April 22, 1943. He was reassigned to serve solely on the Northern District on October 1, 1947. He assumed senior status on January 31, 1958. His service terminated on December 15, 1963, due to his death.

=== Segregationist ===
On the court DeVane earned a reputation as a "staunch segregationist." DeVane was assigned to the 1962 case James H. Meredith v. Charles Dickson Fair, et al. DeVane dissented from the decision of judges John Minor Wisdom and John Robert Brown allowing James H. Meredith to enroll at the University of Mississippi, which had denied him admission on account of his race.

== Sources ==
Legal offices
Preceded by Curtis L. Waller	Judge of the United States District Court for the Northern District of Florida; 1943–1958	Succeeded by G. Harrold Carswell
Preceded by Curtis L. Waller	Judge of the United States District Court for the Southern District of Florida; 1943–1947	Succeeded by Seat abolished
