= Rufus Edward Foster =

American judge (1871–1942)

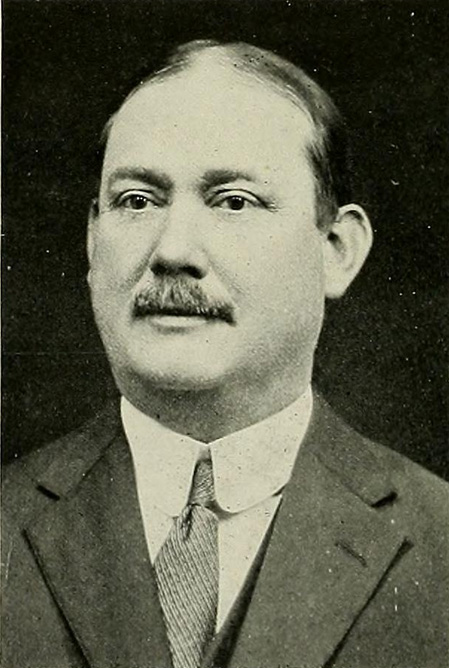
- Foster pictured in The Jambalaya 1921, Tulane yearbook

Judge of the United States Court of Appeals for the Fifth Circuit
- In office January 13, 1925 – August 23, 1942
- Appointed by: Calvin Coolidge
- Preceded by: Alexander Campbell King
- Succeeded by: Elmo Pearce Lee

Judge of the United States District Court for the Eastern District of Louisiana
- In office February 2, 1909 – January 13, 1925
- Appointed by: Theodore Roosevelt
- Preceded by: Eugene Davis Saunders
- Succeeded by: Charlton Beattie

Personal details
- Born: Rufus Edward Foster; May 22, 1871 Mathews County, Virginia
- Died: August 23, 1942 (aged 71)
- Party: Republican
- Education: Tulane University Law School (LLB)

Rufus Edward Foster (May 22, 1871 – August 23, 1942) was a United States circuit judge of the United States Court of Appeals for the Fifth Circuit and previously was a United States district judge of the United States District Court for the Eastern District of Louisiana.

== Education and career ==
Born in Mathews County, Virginia, Foster received a Bachelor of Laws from Tulane University Law School in 1895. He was in the United States Army as a Lieutenant from 1898 to 1899. He was an Assistant United States Attorney for the Eastern District of Louisiana from 1905 to 1908. He was the United States Attorney for the Eastern District of Louisiana in 1908, a delegate to the 1908 Republican National Convention, and a Professor of Law for the Tulane University Law School from 1912 to 1927, and Dean of that institution from 1920 to 1927.

== Federal judicial service ==
Foster was nominated by President Theodore Roosevelt on January 22, 1909, to a seat on the United States District Court for the Eastern District of Louisiana vacated by Judge Eugene Davis Saunders. He was confirmed by the United States Senate on February 2, 1909, and received his commission the same day. His service terminated on January 13, 1925, due to his elevation to the Fifth Circuit.

Foster was nominated by President Calvin Coolidge on January 3, 1925, to a seat on the United States Court of Appeals for the Fifth Circuit vacated by Judge Alexander Campbell King. He was confirmed by the Senate on January 13, 1925, and received his commission the same day. He was a member of the Conference of Senior Circuit Judges (now the Judicial Conference of the United States) from 1935 to 1941. His service terminated on August 23, 1942, due to his death. He was the last federal judge continuously in active service from the presidency of Theodore Roosevelt. (Note: The last federal judge in active service appointed to his position by Theodore Roosevelt, Thomas Charles Munger, took senior status in the summer of 1941 and died the following winter.)

== Sources ==
Legal offices
Preceded by Eugene Davis Saunders	Judge of the United States District Court for the Eastern District of Louisiana; 1909–1925	Succeeded by Charlton Beattie
Preceded by Alexander Campbell King	Judge of the United States Court of Appeals for the Fifth Circuit; 1925–1942	Succeeded by Elmo Pearce Lee
