= Eugene Davis Saunders =

American judge

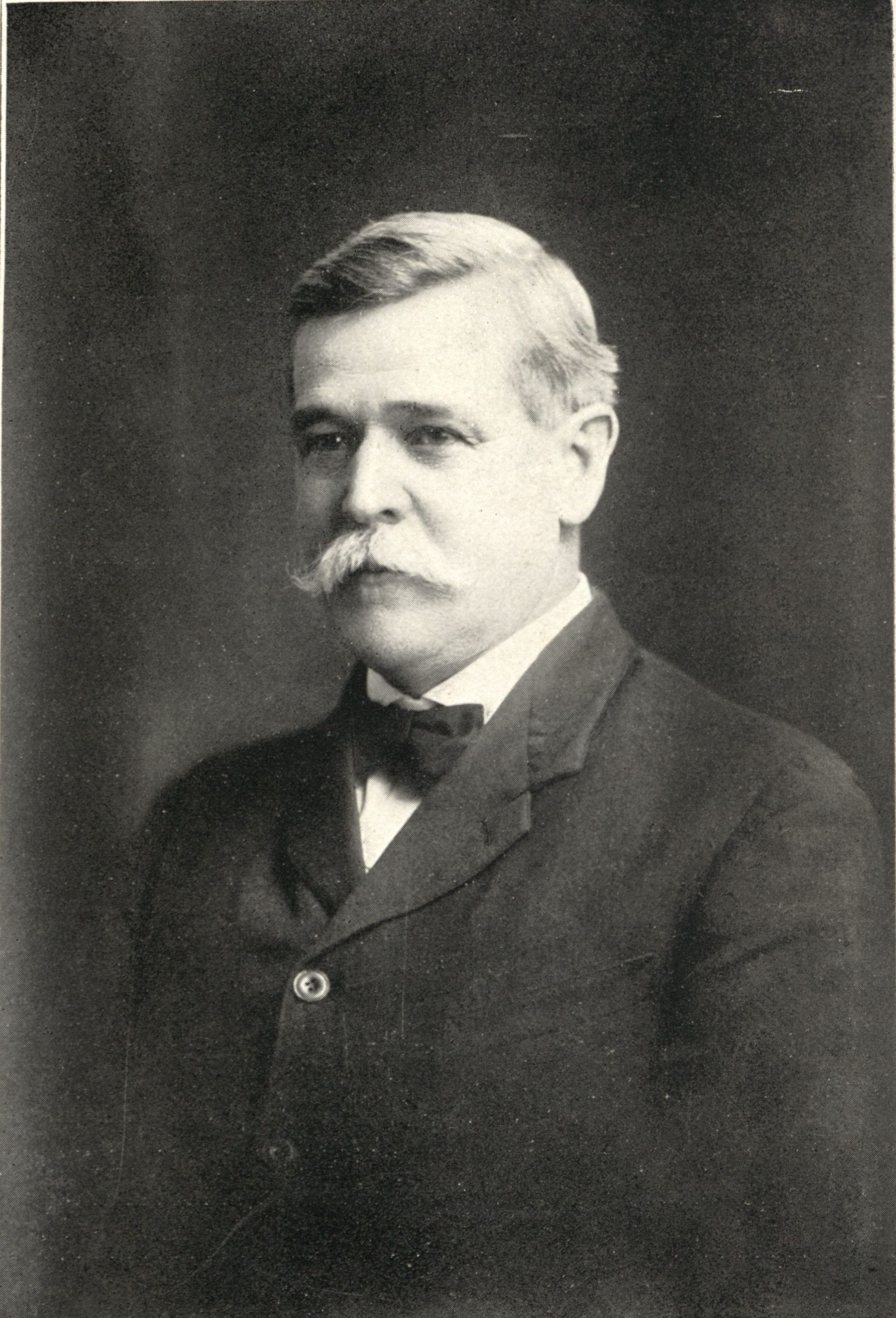

Judge of the United States District Court for the Eastern District of Louisiana
- In office February 20, 1907 – February 8, 1909
- Appointed by: Theodore Roosevelt
- Preceded by: Charles Parlange
- Succeeded by: Rufus Edward Foster

Personal details
- Born: Eugene Davis Saunders; July 25, 1853 Campbell County, Virginia
- Died: October 27, 1914 (aged 61) Virginia
- Education: University of Virginia School of Law (LL.B.)

Eugene Davis Saunders (July 25, 1853 – October 27, 1914) was a United States district judge of the United States District Court for the Eastern District of Louisiana.

== Education and career ==
Born in Campbell County, Virginia, Saunders received a Bachelor of Laws from the University of Virginia School of Law in 1873. He was in private practice in Galveston, Texas from 1873 to 1875, and in New Orleans, Louisiana from 1877 to 1907. He was a professor of Law for Tulane University Law School.

== Federal judicial service ==
Saunders was nominated by President Theodore Roosevelt on February 11, 1907, to a seat on the United States District Court for the Eastern District of Louisiana vacated by Judge Charles Parlange. He was confirmed by the United States Senate on February 20, 1907, and received his commission the same day. His service terminated on February 8, 1909, due to his resignation. He was succeeded by Judge Rufus Edward Foster.

== Later career and death ==
Following his resignation from the federal bench, Saunders resumed private practice in New Orleans starting in 1909. He died on October 27, 1914, in Virginia.

== Sources ==
Legal offices
Preceded by Charles Parlange	Judge of the United States District Court for the Eastern District of Louisiana; 1907–1909	Succeeded by Rufus Edward Foster
