= John Minor Wisdom United States Court of Appeals Building =

- U.S. Court of Appeals-Fifth Circuit
- U.S. National Register of Historic Places
- U.S. National Historic Landmark
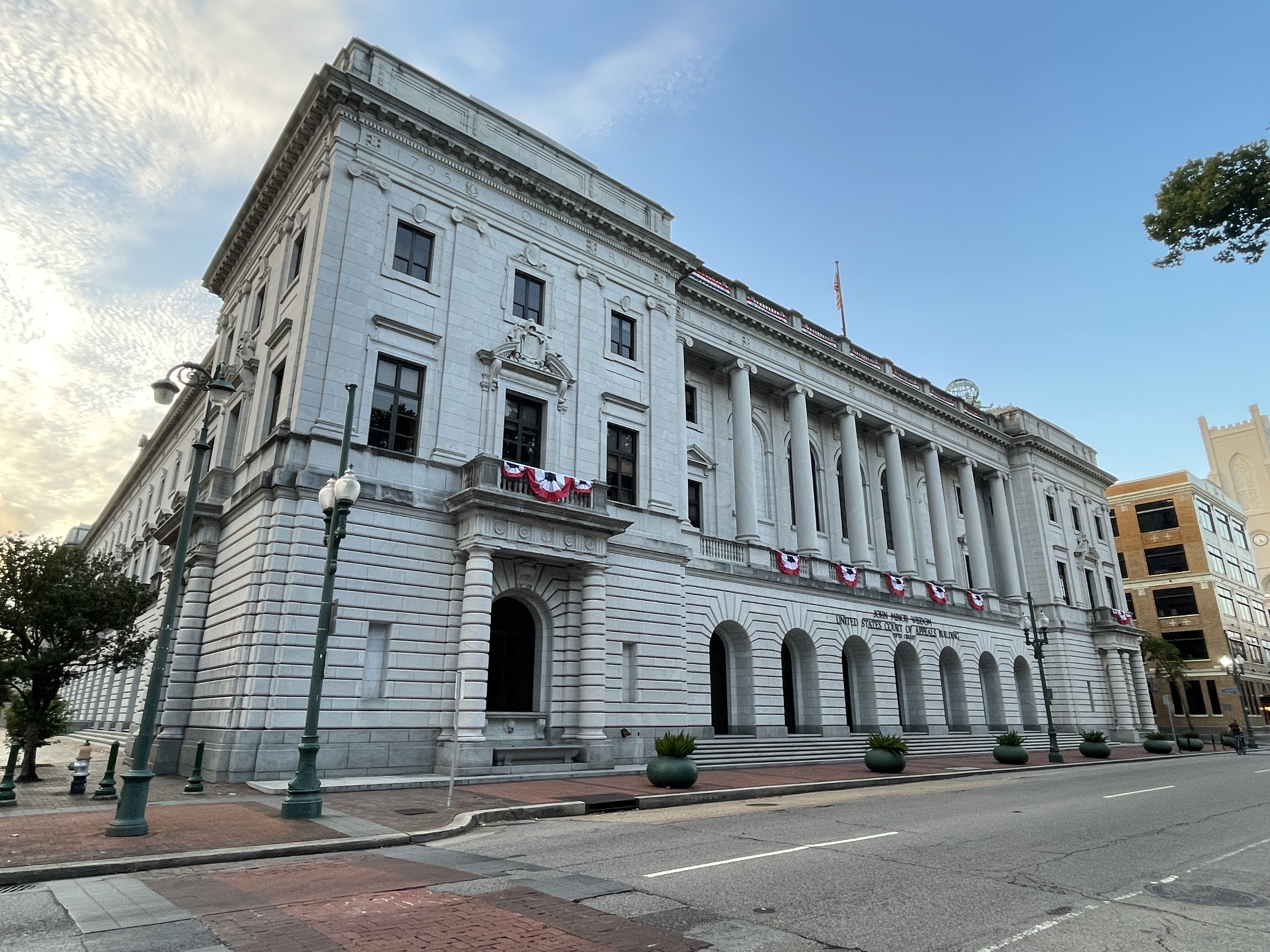
- John Minor Wisdom U.S. Court of Appeals Building, June 2026

- Location within East New Orleans Location within Louisiana Location within the United States
- Location: 600 Camp St., New Orleans, Louisiana
- Coordinates: 29°56′52″N 90°4′45″W
- Area: 1.5 acres (0.61 ha)
- Built: 1915
- Architect: Hale & Rogers; French, Daniel Chester
- Architectural style: Italian Renaissance Revival
- NRHP reference No.: 74000937

Significant dates
- Added to NRHP: February 15, 1974
- Designated NHL: July 21, 2015

The John Minor Wisdom United States Court of Appeals Building is a historic courthouse for the United States Court of Appeals for the Fifth Circuit located at 600 Camp Street in New Orleans, Louisiana. In 2015 it was designated a National Historic Landmark for its extensive role in adjudicating issues of the American Civil Rights Movement of the 1950s and 1960s. John Minor Wisdom, for whom it is now named, was a judge on the Fifth Circuit during that period.

== Building history ==
The John Minor Wisdom U.S. Court of Appeals Building originally housed a U.S. post office and both federal district and appeals courts. In 1908, the New York architectural firm Hale and Rogers won a design competition for the building, and U.S. Treasury Department officials approved their plans in 1909. Workers broke ground later that year on the site, which encompasses the block bounded by Lafayette, Camp, Magazine, and Capdeville streets overlooking Lafayette Square. Construction of the elaborate building took many years; the date 1912 is incised on the frieze on the Lafayette Street side, but the interior was not finished until 1915, and employees were only able to move into their offices the next year. The post office occupied the entire first floor, while the federal district court and court of appeals were on the second. Executive branch agencies were on the third level.

In 1961, needing additional space, the post office moved to a new facility. Two years later, the courts also vacated. The building was unoccupied until 1965, when it served as a public high school for three years after Hurricane Betsy destroyed McDonough 35 High School. Between 1971 and 1972, the federal building underwent an extensive restoration. Upon completion, the Fifth Circuit Court of Appeals returned to the building as its only tenant. The building was listed in the National Register of Historic Places in 1974 and has since been featured in several films and television shows.

In 1994, the building was renamed to honor John Minor Wisdom, a respected judge who served on the Fifth Circuit Court of Appeals from 1957 until his death in 1999. Wisdom strongly promoted civil rights and issued landmark decisions that supported school desegregation and voter rights. In 1993, President Bill Clinton awarded him the Presidential Medal of Freedom, the nation's highest civilian honor.

During Hurricane Katrina in 2005, wind and rain damaged the building, but there was no flooding. The Fifth Circuit Court of Appeals judges and staff briefly relocated to other cities and towns in the region because of damage and power outages, but returned to the building in December 2005 when the issues were resolved.

== Architecture ==
The building is an excellent example of the Italian Renaissance Revival style of architecture. During its construction, author Russell F. Whitehead called the building "the most important public building of the New South." Regional building materials were used throughout, including Mississippi and Louisiana pine, Tennessee and Georgia marble, and Louisiana gum.

The monumental three-story building is faced in white Cherokee, Georgia, marble atop a gray granite base. The first story is articulated with deeply incised horizontal striations while the marble on the upper stories is cut in smooth ashlar blocks. Round-arch openings dominate the first story. Dramatic colonnades with Ionic columns are on the Camp and Magazine street elevations and support a cornice inscribed with the names of past Chief Justices of the Supreme Court.

Projecting corner pavilions rise slightly above the roofline; each pavilion contains an ornate arched opening flanked by marble columns, both freestanding and attached, that are striated to match the pattern on the street level. The columns support entablatures that include classical balustrades. Windows with ornately carved hoods featuring split pediments and eagle-and-shield motifs are directly above the arched openings. Ionic order pilasters separate windows on the upper stories of the pavilions. A balustrade runs between each of the pavilions at the roofline, topping the recessed portion of each elevation. Other exterior elements typical to the Italian Renaissance Revival style of architecture include classical features such as pediments, triglyphs, and dentils, which are interspersed with foliated and floral designs. A unique detail is the arch keystones that have carved fish-scale patterns.

Perhaps the most striking exterior features of the building are the groupings of four colossal statues placed at each of the building's corners. These identical copper and bronze sculptures are called History, Agriculture, Industry, and Arts, but are popularly known as The Ladies. Each figure holds an item associated with the concept it represents. History wears a bonnet; Agriculture holds a cornucopia; Industry holds a tool; and Arts holds a flower. The figures are seated around an armillary sphere banded by the signs of the zodiac. Each sculpture is twelve feet high and weighs one ton. The renowned Piccirilli Brothers, expert marble carvers who also executed Daniel Chester French's statue of President Abraham Lincoln in the Lincoln Memorial, created The Ladies from drawings by architect James Gamble Rogers.

The emphasis of the 1971 to 1972 restoration effort was on the impressive public interior spaces, which were returned to their original grandeur. The first floor lobby, known as the Great Hall, is an L-shaped space with marble columns that support an elaborate bronzed castplaster vaulted ceiling. The ceiling is richly decorated with bas relief floral medallions and motifs, geometric key designs, and allegorical figures. Spherical lights are held in place by bronze pendant fixtures that descend from the vaulted ceiling. The court's law library occupies the original postal work area on the first floor.

Three courtrooms, each with an entry lobby with marble wainscot walls, are located on the second floor. The courtrooms are paneled in polished gum wood and bronze chandeliers hang from the ceiling. Distinctive wall sconces that feature large white globes supported by either cast-bronze eagles or snakes illuminate the spaces. The central courtroom is perhaps the most impressive. Called the En Banc courtroom, it was designed to seat all of the active judges on the Court of Appeals simultaneously so that they can hear important cases together. The plaster ceiling features medallions and other symbols and has been finished with a bronze glaze.

== Significant events ==
- 1909: Construction commences
- 1912: Roof sculpture installed
- 1915: Construction completed at a cost of $2 million and building occupied
- 1961: Post office vacates building
- 1972: Restoration completed
- 1974: Building listed in the National Register of Historic Places
- 1994: Building renamed to honor John Minor Wisdom
- 2015: Building designated National Historic Landmark

== Building facts ==
- Location: 600 Camp Street
- Architect: Hale and Rogers
- Construction Dates: 1909–1915
- Architectural Style: Italian Renaissance Revival
- Landmark Status: Listed in the National Register of Historic Places
- Primary Materials: Marble
- Prominent Features: Colonnades; Great Hall; "The Ladies" sculptural groupings

== See also ==
- List of National Historic Landmarks in Louisiana
- National Register of Historic Places listings in New Orleans
