= Robert L. Genin =

American politician (1886–1961)

Member of the Mississippi House of Representatives from the Hancock County district
- In office January 1926 – January 1928
- Preceded by: Curtis Longino Waller
- In office January 1912 – January 1920

Personal details
- Born: July 12, 1886 New Orleans, LA
- Died: April 6, 1961 (aged 74) Bay St. Louis, MS
- Party: Democrat

Robert Lawrence Genin (July 12, 1886 – April 6, 1961) was a Democratic member of the Mississippi House of Representatives, representing Hancock County from 1912 to 1920 and from 1926 to 1928.

== Early life ==
Robert Lawrence Genin was born on July 12, 1886, in New Orleans, Louisiana. His father, John Genin, was born in Paris, France. His mother, Delphine (Murr) Genin, was also of French descent. He attended the public schools of New Orleans, and later, Bay St. Louis. He was a manager of the Cumberland Telephone and Telegraph Company at Bay St. Louis from 1905 to 1909. He took a law course at the University of Mississippi and graduated with a Bachelor of Laws degree on June 2, 1909. He began practicing law at Bay St. Louis the same year.

== Political career ==
Genin was a city councilman of Bay St. Louis from March 1910 to January 1912. In November 1911, he was elected to the Mississippi House of Representatives, representing Hancock County as a Democrat for the 1912–1916 term. During this term, he introduced a bill to protect Mississippi's coastline and a bill to connect Mississippi to New Orleans by dredging the Pearl River. He was re-elected without opposition for the 1916–1920 term. Although he was not re-elected in 1919, after the resignation of Curtis Longino Waller from the House in 1925, Genin was elected to fill in his position for the session of 1926.

== Later life ==
At the time of his death, Genin was a member of the Hancock County Board of Election Commissioners. He died on April 6, 1961, in Bay St. Louis. He was survived by two sons and two daughters.
