= Andrew Phelps McCormick =

American judge (1832–1916)

Judge of the United States Court of Appeals for the Fifth Circuit
- In office March 17, 1892 – November 2, 1916
- Appointed by: Benjamin Harrison
- Preceded by: Seat established by 26 Stat. 826
- Succeeded by: R. L. Batts

Judge of the United States Circuit Courts for the Fifth Circuit
- In office March 17, 1892 – December 31, 1911
- Appointed by: Benjamin Harrison
- Preceded by: Seat established by 26 Stat. 826
- Succeeded by: Seat abolished

Judge of the United States District Court for the Northern District of Texas
- In office April 10, 1879 – March 22, 1892
- Appointed by: Rutherford B. Hayes
- Preceded by: Seat established by 20 Stat. 318
- Succeeded by: John B. Rector

Personal details
- Born: December 18, 1832 Brazoria District, Coahuila y Tejas, First Mexican Republic (now Brazoria County, Texas, U.S.)
- Died: November 2, 1916 (aged 83) Waco, Texas, U.S.
- Education: Centre College (AB) read law

Andrew Phelps McCormick (December 18, 1832 – November 2, 1916) was a United States circuit judge of the United States Court of Appeals for the Fifth Circuit and of the United States Circuit Courts for the Fifth Circuit and previously was a United States district judge of the United States District Court for the Northern District of Texas.

== Education and career ==
Born in Brazoria County (then part of Mexico, now Texas), McCormick received an Artium Baccalaureus degree from Centre College in 1854 and read law in 1855. He was in private practice in Brazoria, Texas from 1855 to 1861, becoming a Texas district judge in 1856. He was in the Confederate States Army during the American Civil War, from 1861 to 1865, and was thereafter again a Judge of the Brazoria County Court and a probate judge from 1865 to 1866. He was a Judge of the Texas District Court for Brazoria and Galveston Counties from 1871 to 1876. He served in the Texas Senate from 1876 to 1879, and was then the United States Attorney for the Eastern District of Texas in 1879.

== Federal judicial service ==
McCormick was nominated by President Rutherford B. Hayes on April 7, 1879, to the United States District Court for the Northern District of Texas, to a new seat authorized by 20 Stat. 318. He was confirmed by the United States Senate on April 10, 1879, and received his commission the same day. His service was terminated on March 22, 1892, due to his elevation to the Fifth Circuit.

McCormick was nominated by President Benjamin Harrison on January 5, 1892, to the United States Court of Appeals for the Fifth Circuit and the United States Circuit Courts for the Fifth Circuit, to a new joint seat authorized by 26 Stat. 826. He was confirmed by the Senate on March 17, 1892, and received his commission the same day. On December 31, 1911, the Circuit Courts were abolished and he thereafter served only on the Court of Appeals. His service was terminated on November 2, 1916, due to his death in Waco, Texas.

== See also ==
- List of United States federal judges by longevity of service

== Sources ==
Legal offices
Preceded by Seat established by 20 Stat. 318	Judge of the United States District Court for the Northern District of Texas; 1879–1892	Succeeded by John B. Rector
Preceded by Seat established by 26 Stat. 826	Judge of the United States Circuit Courts for the Fifth Circuit; 1892–1911	Succeeded by Seat abolished
Preceded by Seat established by 26 Stat. 826	Judge of the United States Court of Appeals for the Fifth Circuit; 1892–1916	Succeeded by R. L. Batts
