= Nanafalia, Alabama =

Unincorporated community in Alabama, United States

- Census-designated place
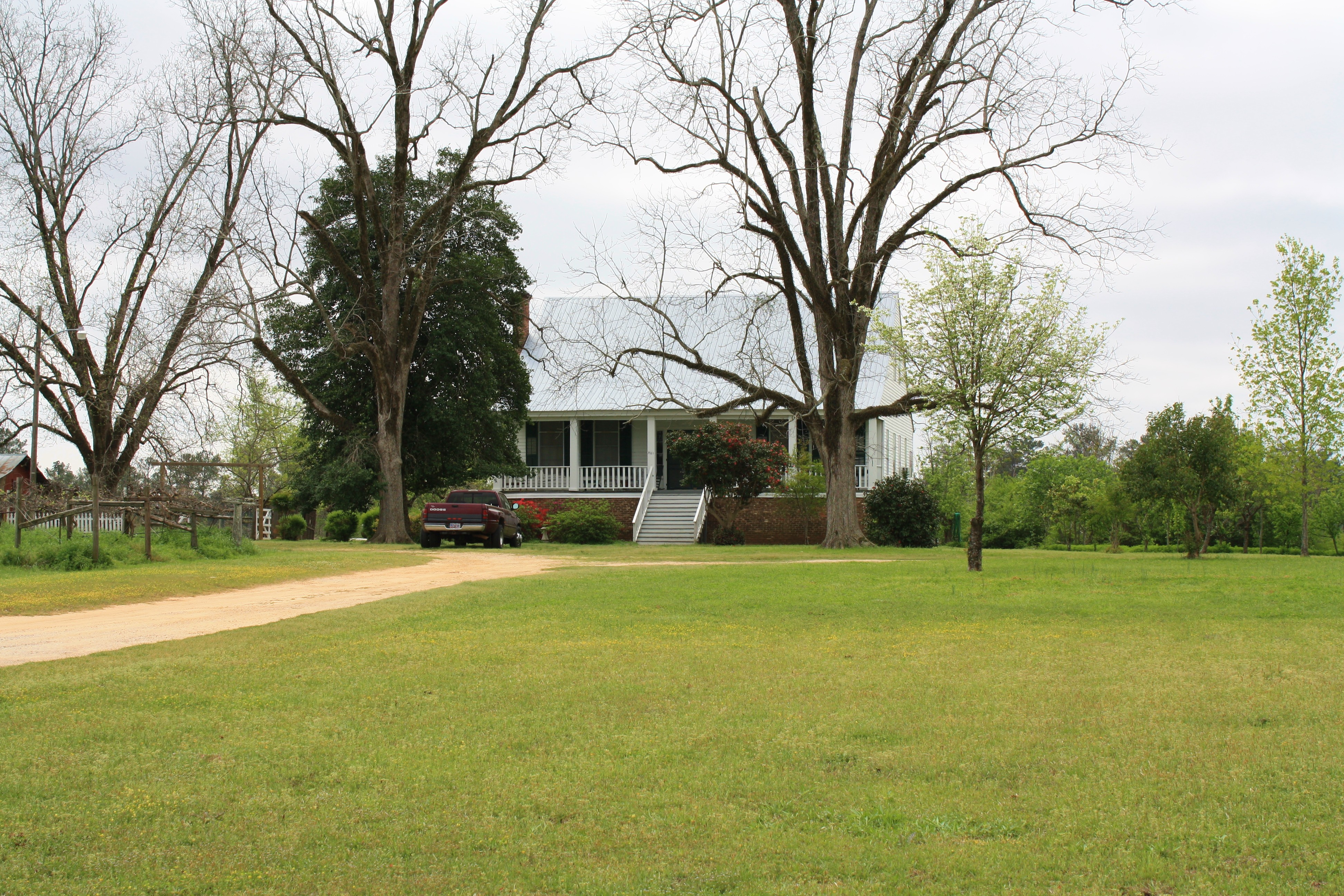
- Mathers House, the oldest house remaining in Nanafalia

- Coordinates: 32°06′50″N 87°59′52″W
- Country: United States
- State: Alabama
- County: Marengo

Area
  - Total: 2.17 sq mi (5.6 km^{2})
  - Land: 2.17 sq mi (5.6 km^{2})
  - Water: 0.00 sq mi (0 km^{2})
- Elevation: 217 ft (66 m)

Population (2020)
  - Total: 75
  - Density: 34.56/sq mi (13.34/km^{2})
- Time zone: UTC-6 (Central (CST))
  - Summer (DST): UTC-5 (CDT)
- ZIP code: 36764
- Area code: 334
- FIPS code: 01-53208
- GNIS feature ID: 2628600

Nanafalia is an unincorporated community and census-designated place (CDP) in Marengo County, Alabama, United States. As of the 2020 census, its population was 75, down from 94 at the 2010 census. The community is located on a ridge above the Tombigbee River, and the name is derived from the Choctaw words for long hill. Nanafalia has a post office with a zip code of 36764.

== Geography ==
Nanafalia is in southwestern Marengo County, along Alabama State Route 10. State Route 69 forms the western border of the CDP. Linden, the county seat, is 21 miles (34 km) to the northeast.

The Nanafalia CDP has an area of 2.2 square miles (5.7 km^{2}), all land. The community is on a flat-topped ridge which drains north to South Double Creek and south to an unnamed tributary of Horse Creek. Both named creeks flow west to the Tombigbee River.

== Demographics ==
Historical population
Census	Pop.	Note	%±
2010	94		—
2020	75		−20.2%
U.S. Decennial Census

Nanafalia was listed as a census designated place in the 2010 U.S. census.

=== 2020 census ===
Nanafalia CDP, Alabama – Racial and ethnic composition Note: the US Census treats Hispanic/Latino as an ethnic category. This table excludes Latinos from the racial categories and assigns them to a separate category. Hispanics/Latinos may be of any race.
Race / Ethnicity (NH = Non-Hispanic)	Pop 2010	Pop 2020	% 2010	% 2020
White alone (NH)	54	36	57.45%	48.00%
Black or African American alone (NH)	38	35	40.43%	46.67%
Native American or Alaska Native alone (NH)	0	0	0.00%	0.00%
Asian alone (NH)	0	0	0.00%	0.00%
Native Hawaiian or Pacific Islander alone (NH)	0	0	0.00%	0.00%
Other race alone (NH)	0	1	0.00%	1.33%
Mixed race or Multiracial (NH)	2	1	2.13%	1.33%
Hispanic or Latino (any race)	0	2	0.00%	2.67%
Total	94	75	100.00%	100.00%

=== 2010 census ===
As of the 2010 United States census, there were 94 people living in the CDP. The racial makeup of the CDP was 57.4% White, 40.4% Black and 2.1% from two or more races.

== Notable people ==
- Walter Pettus Gewin, former federal judge
- Chris Landrum, American football linebacker, Los Angeles Chargers
