= John Milton Bryan Simpson =

American judge (1903–1987)

Senior Judge of the United States Court of Appeals for the Eleventh Circuit
- In office October 1, 1981 – August 22, 1987

Senior Judge of the United States Court of Appeals for the Fifth Circuit
- In office June 30, 1975 – October 1, 1981

Judge of the United States Court of Appeals for the Fifth Circuit
- In office November 3, 1966 – June 30, 1975
- Appointed by: Lyndon B. Johnson
- Preceded by: Seat established by 80 Stat. 75
- Succeeded by: Gerald Bard Tjoflat

Chief Judge of the United States District Court for the Middle District of Florida
- In office 1962–1966
- Preceded by: Office established
- Succeeded by: Joseph Patrick Lieb

Judge of the United States District Court for the Middle District of Florida
- In office October 29, 1962 – November 22, 1966
- Appointed by: operation of law
- Preceded by: Seat established by 76 Stat. 247
- Succeeded by: Ben Krentzman

Chief Judge of the United States District Court for the Southern District of Florida
- In office 1961–1962
- Preceded by: George William Whitehurst
- Succeeded by: David W. Dyer

Judge of the United States District Court for the Southern District of Florida
- In office September 26, 1950 – October 29, 1962
- Appointed by: Harry S. Truman
- Preceded by: Louie Willard Strum
- Succeeded by: Seat abolished

Personal details
- Born: John Milton Bryan Simpson; May 30, 1903 Kissimmee, Florida
- Died: August 22, 1987 (aged 84) Jacksonville, Florida
- Education: Fredric G. Levin College of Law (LLB)

John Milton Bryan Simpson (May 30, 1903 – August 22, 1987) was a United States circuit judge of the United States Court of Appeals for the Fifth Circuit and the United States Court of Appeals for the Eleventh Circuit and previously was a United States district judge of the United States District Court for the Southern District of Florida and the United States District Court for the Middle District of Florida.

== Education and career ==
Born in Kissimmee, Florida, Simpson served in the United States Army, as a 1st Lt., in the European Theater from 1943 to 1945. Received a Bachelor of Laws from the Fredric G. Levin College of Law at the University of Florida in 1926. He was in private practice of law in Jacksonville, Florida from 1926 to 1946. He was an assistant state's attorney of the Fourth Florida Circuit from 1933 to 1939. He was a Judge of the Criminal Court of Record in Duval County, Florida from 1939 to 1943. He was a United States Army First Lieutenant from 1943 to 1945. He was a Judge of the Criminal Court of Record in Duval County from 1945 to 1946. He was a Circuit Judge of the Fourth Judicial Circuit Court of Florida from 1946 to 1950.

== Federal judicial service ==
Simpson was nominated by President Harry S Truman on September 14, 1950, to a seat on the United States District Court for the Southern District of Florida vacated by Judge Louie Willard Strum. He was confirmed by the United States Senate on September 23, 1950, and received his commission on September 26, 1950. He served as Chief Judge from 1961 to 1962. He was reassigned by operation of law on October 29, 1962 to the newly created United States District Court for the Middle District of Florida, to a seat established by 76 Stat. 247. He served as Chief Judge from 1962 to 1966. His service was terminated on November 22, 1966, due to elevation to the Fifth Circuit.

Simpson was nominated by President Lyndon B. Johnson on October 11, 1966, to the United States Court of Appeals for the Fifth Circuit, to a new seat created by 80 Stat. 75. He was confirmed by the Senate on October 20, 1966, and received his commission on November 3, 1966. He assumed senior status on June 30, 1975. He was reassigned by operation of law on October 1, 1981, to the United States Court of Appeals for the Eleventh Circuit. His service was terminated on August 22, 1987, due to his death.

=== Brown v. Board of Education ===
Judge Simpson was noted for desegregating schools in Jacksonville, Florida. In 1962 he ordered the Duval County Public Schools to develop a plan to remove separate school zones based on race.

== Honor ==
The John Milton Bryan Simpson United States Courthouse in Jacksonville in named in his honor.

== Sources ==
Legal offices
Preceded by Louie Willard Strum	Judge of the United States District Court for the Southern District of Florida; 1950–1962	Succeeded by Seat abolished
Preceded by George William Whitehurst	Chief Judge of the United States District Court for the Southern District of Florida; 1961–1962	Succeeded by David W. Dyer
Preceded by Seat established by 76 Stat. 247	Judge of the United States District Court for the Middle District of Florida; 1962–1966	Succeeded by Ben Krentzman
Preceded by Office established	Chief Judge of the United States District Court for the Middle District of Florida; 1962–1966	Succeeded by Joseph Patrick Lieb
Preceded by Seat established by 80 Stat. 75	Judge of the United States Court of Appeals for the Fifth Circuit; 1966–1975	Succeeded by Gerald Bard Tjoflat
