= David W. Dyer =

American judge (1910–1998)

Senior Judge of the United States Court of Appeals for the Eleventh Circuit
- In office October 1, 1981 – June 7, 1998

Senior Judge of the United States Court of Appeals for the Fifth Circuit
- In office September 30, 1976 – October 1, 1981

Judge of the United States Court of Appeals for the Fifth Circuit
- In office August 25, 1966 – September 30, 1976
- Appointed by: Lyndon B. Johnson
- Preceded by: Warren Leroy Jones
- Succeeded by: Peter T. Fay

Chief Judge of the United States District Court for the Southern District of Florida
- In office October 29, 1962 – September 22, 1966
- Preceded by: John Milton Bryan Simpson
- Succeeded by: Charles B. Fulton

Judge of the United States District Court for the Southern District of Florida
- In office September 18, 1961 – September 22, 1966
- Appointed by: John F. Kennedy
- Preceded by: Seat established by 75 Stat. 80
- Succeeded by: Joe Oscar Eaton

Personal details
- Born: David William Dyer; June 28, 1910 Columbus, Ohio, US
- Died: June 7, 1998 (aged 87) Miami, Florida, US
- Education: Stetson University College of Law (LLB)

David William Dyer (June 28, 1910 – June 7, 1998) was a United States circuit judge of the United States Court of Appeals for the Fifth Circuit and the United States Court of Appeals for the Eleventh Circuit.

== Education and career ==
Born in Columbus, Ohio, Dyer received a Bachelor of Laws from Stetson University College of Law in 1933. He was in private practice of law in Dade County, Florida from 1933 to 1942. He was a United States Army Major in the JAG Corps from 1942 to 1945. He returned to the private practice of law in Dade County from 1945 to 1961.

== Federal judicial service ==
Dyer was nominated by President John F. Kennedy on September 1, 1961, to the United States District Court for the Southern District of Florida, to a new seat created by 75 Stat. 80. He was confirmed by the United States Senate on September 8, 1961, and received his commission on September 18, 1961. He served as Chief Judge from 1962 to 1966. His service was terminated on September 22, 1966, due to elevation to the Fifth Circuit.

Dyer was nominated by President Lyndon B. Johnson on August 16, 1966, to a seat on the United States Court of Appeals for the Fifth Circuit vacated by Judge Warren Leroy Jones. He was confirmed by the Senate on August 25, 1966, and received his commission the same day. He assumed senior status on September 30, 1976. He was reassigned by operation of law to the United States Court of Appeals for the Eleventh Circuit on October 1, 1981. His service was terminated on June 7, 1998, due to his death in Miami, Florida.

=== Notable clerk ===
Kenneth Starr was one of Dyer's law clerks, before clerking for Warren E. Burger. The David W. Dyer Federal Building and U.S. Courthouse is named for him.

== Sources ==
Legal offices
Preceded by Seat established by 75 Stat. 80	Judge of the United States District Court for the Southern District of Florida; 1958–1966	Succeeded by Joe Oscar Eaton
Preceded by John Milton Bryan Simpson	Chief Judge of the United States District Court for the Southern District of Florida; 1962–1966	Succeeded by Charles B. Fulton
Preceded by Warren Leroy Jones	Judge of the United States Court of Appeals for the Fifth Circuit; 1966–1976	Succeeded by Peter T. Fay
