= R. L. Batts =

American judge (1864–1935)

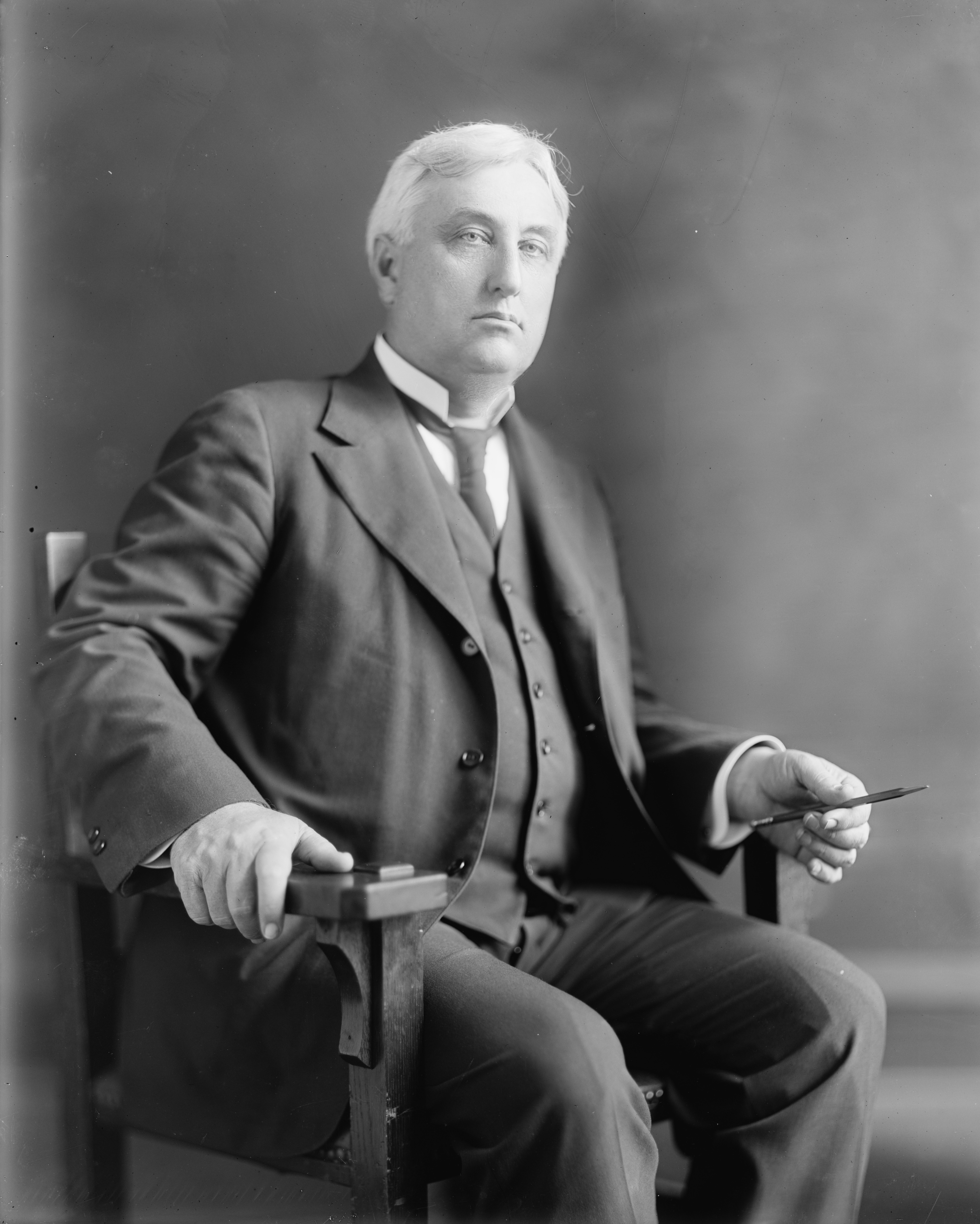
- Formal portrait of Batts

Judge of the United States Court of Appeals for the Fifth Circuit
- In office February 5, 1917 – August 22, 1919
- Appointed by: Woodrow Wilson
- Preceded by: Andrew Phelps McCormick
- Succeeded by: Nathan Philemon Bryan

Personal details
- Born: Robert Lynn Batts; November 1, 1864 Bastrop, Texas, U.S.
- Died: May 19, 1935 (aged 70) Austin, Texas, U.S.
- Education: University of Texas School of Law (LLB)

Robert Lynn Batts (November 1, 1864 – May 19, 1935), known professionally as R. L. Batts, was a United States circuit judge of the United States Court of Appeals for the Fifth Circuit.

== Education and career ==
Born in Bastrop, Texas, Batts received a Bachelor of Laws from the University of Texas School of Law in 1886 and entered private practice in Bastrop from 1886 to 1891. He was an assistant state attorney general of Texas from 1891 to 1893. He was then a professor of law at the University of Texas at Austin from 1893 to 1900. He was in private practice in Austin, Texas from 1900 to 1917.

== Federal judicial service ==
Batts was nominated by President Woodrow Wilson on January 17, 1917, to a seat on the United States Court of Appeals for the Fifth Circuit vacated by Judge Andrew Phelps McCormick. He was confirmed by the United States Senate on February 5, 1917, and received his commission the same day. Batts resigned on August 22, 1919.

== Post judicial service and death ==
Batts was general counsel to Gulf Oil from 1919 to 1923. He returned to private practice in Austin from 1924 to 1935. He died on May 19, 1935.

== Selected published work ==
- Batts, R. L. (1864–1935) (annotator) (August 1897). Batts' Annotated Revised Civil Statutes of Texas, 1895. Vol. 1. Austin: Eugene Von Boeckmann (1853–1897) (original printer). OCLC 1131864901. 310369789 (print book); 607381967 (print book); 680532978 (online); 5069496 (online)
- Batts, R. L. (1864–1935) (annotator) (August 1897). Batts' Annotated Revised Civil Statutes of Texas, 1895. Vol. 2. Austin: Eugene Von Boeckmann (1853–1897) (original printer). OCLC 1131864901. 310369789 (print book); 607381967 (print book); 680532978 (online); 5069496 (online)

== Bibliography ==
=== References ===
- "Batts, Robert Lynn". Biographical Directory of Federal Judges (public domain). Federal Judicial Center. n.d. OCLC 45675582.
- In Memory of Robert Lynn Batts. Austin, Texas: Travis County Bar Association. 1935. OCLC 25144218.

Legal offices
Preceded by Andrew Phelps McCormick	Judge of the United States Court of Appeals for the Fifth Circuit; 1917–1919	Succeeded by Nathan Philemon Bryan
