= United States Court of Appeals for the Fifth Circuit =

Current United States federal appellate court

- (5th Cir.)

- Location: John Minor Wisdom U.S. Court of Appeals Building (New Orleans, Louisiana)
- Appeals from: Eastern District of Louisiana; Middle District of Louisiana; Western District of Louisiana; Northern District of Mississippi; Southern District of Mississippi; Eastern District of Texas; Northern District of Texas; Southern District of Texas; Western District of Texas
- Established: June 16, 1891
- Judges: 17
- Circuit Justice: Samuel Alito
- Chief Judge: Jennifer Walker Elrod
- www.ca5.uscourts.gov

The United States Court of Appeals for the Fifth Circuit (in case citations, 5th Cir.) is one of the 13 United States courts of appeals. It has appellate jurisdiction over the U.S. district courts in the following federal judicial districts:

- Eastern District of Louisiana
- Middle District of Louisiana
- Western District of Louisiana
- Northern District of Mississippi
- Southern District of Mississippi
- Eastern District of Texas
- Northern District of Texas
- Southern District of Texas
- Western District of Texas

The Fifth Circuit has 17 active judgeships, and is headquartered at the John Minor Wisdom United States Court of Appeals Building in New Orleans, Louisiana, with the clerk's office located at the F. Edward Hebert Federal Building in New Orleans.

Originally, the Fifth Circuit also included the federal district courts in Alabama, Georgia, and Florida. In 1981, the district courts for those states were transferred to the newly created U.S. Court of Appeals for the Eleventh Circuit.

In the 2020s, the Fifth Circuit has sometimes been described as the most reversed federal courts of appeals. However, because different circuits have different numbers of cases, the percentage of reversals, which is somewhat higher than average, does not necessarily mean that the Fifth Circuit always has the largest raw number of cases reversed or the highest percentage.

== History of the court ==
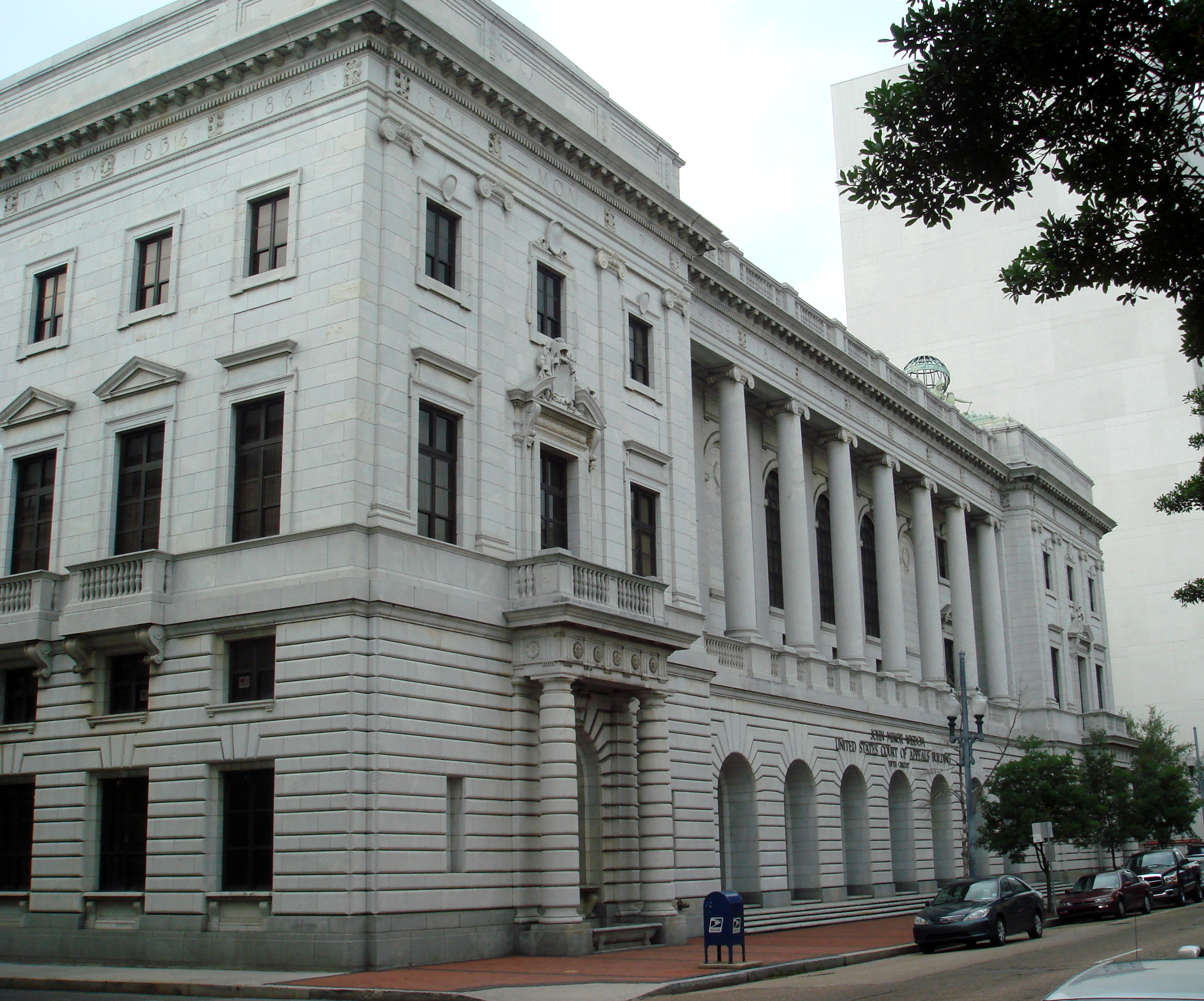
The John Minor Wisdom U.S. Courthouse, home of the Fifth Circuit, New Orleans

This court was created by the Evarts Act on June 16, 1891, which moved the circuit judges and appellate jurisdiction from the Circuit Courts of the Fifth Circuit to this court. At the time of its creation, the Fifth Circuit covered Florida, Georgia, Alabama, Mississippi, Louisiana, and Texas.

On June 25, 1948, the Panama Canal Zone was added to the Fifth Circuit by 62 Stat. 870. The Fifth Circuit gained appellate jurisdiction over the United States District Court for the Canal Zone.

On October 1, 1981, under Pub. L. 96–452, the Fifth Circuit was split: Alabama, Georgia, and Florida were moved to the new Eleventh Circuit.

On March 31, 1982, the Fifth Circuit lost jurisdiction over the Panama Canal Zone, which was transferred to Panamanian control.

=== Fifth Circuit Four ===
Starting in the late 1950s, judges Elbert Parr Tuttle (chief judge 1960–1967), John Minor Wisdom, John R. Brown (chief judge 1967–1979), and Richard T. Rives (chief judge 1959–60) became known as the "Fifth Circuit Four", or simply "The Four", for decisions crucial in advancing the civil rights of African Americans. In this, they were usually opposed by their fellow Fifth Circuit Judge, Benjamin F. Cameron of Mississippi, until his death in 1964. During this era, the role of the Fifth Circuit in civil rights caused the court to be nicknamed the "Supreme Court of Dixie".

=== 2020s ===
During his first administration, President Donald Trump appointed six judges to the court, with many observers thereafter regarding it as the most conservative court of appeals. The Fifth Circuit's reversal rate at the US Supreme Court from the beginning of the 2020 term through the end of the 2022 term was 74%, making it the 7th most frequently reversed circuit court; the average rate of reversals was 68%.

Some members of the Supreme Court, including Chief Justice John Roberts, have indicated concern with how the Fifth Circuit approaches cases. Several court observers have interpreted the court as being exceptionally conservative in its rulings. The court has tended towards a permissive view of standing and a legal philosophy of originalism. Appeals from the Fifth Circuit "have made up a disproportionate number of cases heard by the Supreme Court".

== Current composition of the court ==
As of November 17, 2026:

#	Title	Judge	Duty station	Born	Term of service			Appointed by
#	Title	Judge	Duty station	Born	Active	Chief	Senior	Appointed by
78	Chief Judge	Jennifer Walker Elrod	Houston, TX	1966	2007–present	2024–present	—	G.W. Bush
63	Circuit Judge	Edith Jones	Houston, TX	1949	1985–present	2006–2012	—	Reagan
64	Circuit Judge	Jerry Edwin Smith	Houston, TX	1946	1987–present	—	—	Reagan
71	Circuit Judge	Carl E. Stewart	Shreveport, LA	1950	1994–present	2012–2019	—	Clinton
77	Circuit Judge	Priscilla Richman	Austin, TX	1954	2005–present	2019–2024	—	G.W. Bush
79	Circuit Judge	Leslie H. Southwick	Austin, TX	1950	2007–present	—	—	G.W. Bush
80	Circuit Judge	Catharina Haynes	Dallas, TX	1963	2008–present	—	—	G.W. Bush
81	Circuit Judge	James E. Graves Jr.	Jackson, MS	1953	2011–present	—	—	Obama
82	Circuit Judge	Stephen A. Higginson	New Orleans, LA	1961	2011–present	—	—	Obama
84	Circuit Judge	Don Willett	Austin, TX	1966	2018–present	—	—	Trump
85	Circuit Judge	James C. Ho	Dallas, TX	1973	2018–present	—	—	Trump
86	Circuit Judge	Kyle Duncan	New Orleans, LA	1972	2018–present	—	—	Trump
88	Circuit Judge	Andrew Oldham	Austin, TX	1978	2018–present	—	—	Trump
89	Circuit Judge	Cory T. Wilson	Jackson, MS	1970	2020–present	—	—	Trump
90	Circuit Judge	Dana Douglas	New Orleans, LA	1975	2022–present	—	—	Biden
91	Circuit Judge	Irma Carrillo Ramirez	Dallas, TX	1964	2023–present	—	—	Biden
92	Circuit Judge	Anna St. John	New Orleans, LA	1979	beg. 2027	—	—	Trump
51	Senior Judge	Carolyn Dineen King	Houston, TX	1938	1979–2013	1999–2006	2013–present	Carter
60	Senior Judge	Patrick Higginbotham	Austin, TX	1938	1982–2006	—	2006–present	Reagan
61	Senior Judge	W. Eugene Davis	New Orleans, LA	1936	1983–2016	—	2016–present	Reagan
66	Senior Judge	Jacques L. Wiener Jr.	New Orleans, LA	1934	1990–2010	—	2010–present	G.H.W. Bush
67	Senior Judge	Rhesa Barksdale	Jackson, MS	1944	1990–2009	—	2009–present	G.H.W. Bush
73	Senior Judge	James L. Dennis	inactive	1936	1995–2022	—	2022–present	Clinton
74	Senior Judge	Edith Brown Clement	New Orleans, LA	1948	2001–2018	—	2018–present	G.W. Bush
87	Senior Judge	Kurt D. Engelhardt	New Orleans, LA	1960	2018–2026	—	2026–present	Trump

== Vacancies and pending nominations ==
Seat	Prior judge's duty station	Seat last held by	Vacancy reason	Date of vacancy	Nominee	Date of nomination
20	Austin, TX	Leslie H. Southwick	Senior status	TBD	G. Todd Butler	November 9, 2026

== List of former judges ==
#	Judge	State	Born–died	Active service	Chief Judge	Senior status	Appointed by	Reason for termination
1	Don Albert Pardee	LA	1837–1919	1891–1919	—	—	Garfield / Operation of law (Note: Pardee was appointed as a circuit judge for the Fifth Circuit in 1881 by James A. Garfield. The Judiciary Act of 1891 reassigned his seat to what is now the U.S. Court of Appeals for the Fifth Circuit.)	death
2	Andrew McCormick	TX	1832–1916	1892–1916	—	—	B. Harrison	death
3	David Davie Shelby	AL	1847–1914	1899–1914	—	—	McKinley	death
4	Richard Wilde Walker Jr.	AL	1857–1936	1914–1930	—	1930–1936	Wilson	death
5	Robert Lynn Batts	TX	1864–1935	1917–1919	—	—	Wilson	resignation
6	Nathan Philemon Bryan	FL	1872–1935	1920–1935	—	—	Wilson	death
7	Alexander Campbell King	GA	1856–1926	1920–1924	—	—	Wilson	resignation
8	Rufus Edward Foster	LA	1871–1942	1925–1942	—	—	Coolidge	death
9	Samuel Hale Sibley	GA	1873–1958	1931–1949	—	1949–1958	Hoover	death
10	Joseph Hutcheson Jr.	TX	1879–1973	1931–1964	1948–1959	1964–1973	Hoover	death
11	Edwin R. Holmes	MS	1878–1961	1936–1954	—	1954–1961	F. Roosevelt	death
12	Leon Clarence McCord	AL	1878–1952	1938–1951	—	1951–1952	F. Roosevelt	death
13	Curtis L. Waller	FL	1887–1950	1943–1950	—	—	F. Roosevelt	death
14	Elmo Pearce Lee	LA	1882–1949	1943–1949	—	—	F. Roosevelt	death
15	Wayne G. Borah	LA	1891–1966	1949–1956	—	1956–1966	Truman	death
16	Robert Lee Russell	GA	1900–1955	1949–1955	—	—	Truman	death
17	Louie Willard Strum	FL	1890–1954	1950–1954	—	—	Truman	death
18	Richard Rives	AL	1895–1982	1951–1966	1959–1960	1966–1981	Truman	reassignment
19	Elbert Tuttle	GA	1897–1996	1954–1968	1960–1967	1968–1981	Eisenhower	reassignment
20	Benjamin Cameron	MS	1890–1964	1955–1964	—	—	Eisenhower	death
21	Warren Leroy Jones	FL	1895–1993	1955–1966	—	1966–1981	Eisenhower	reassignment
22	John Robert Brown	TX	1909–1993	1955–1984	1967–1979	1984–1993	Eisenhower	death
23	John Minor Wisdom	LA	1905–1999	1957–1977	—	1977–1999	Eisenhower	death
24	Griffin Bell	GA	1918–2009	1961–1976 (Note: Recess appointment, confirmed by the United States Senate at a later date.)	—	—	Kennedy	resignation
25	Walter Pettus Gewin	AL	1908–1981	1961–1976	—	1976–1981	Kennedy	death
26	Homer Thornberry	TX	1909–1995	1965–1978	—	1978–1995	L. Johnson	death
27	James P. Coleman	MS	1914–1991	1965–1981	1979–1981	1981–1984	L. Johnson	retirement
28	Robert A. Ainsworth Jr.	LA	1910–1981	1966–1981	—	—	L. Johnson	death
29	John Cooper Godbold	AL	1920–2009	1966–1981	1981	—	L. Johnson	reassignment
30	Irving Loeb Goldberg	TX	1906–1995	1966–1980	—	1980–1995	L. Johnson	death
31	David W. Dyer	FL	1910–1998	1966–1976	—	1976–1981	L. Johnson	reassignment
32	John Simpson	FL	1903–1987	1966–1975	—	1975–1981	L. Johnson	reassignment
33	Claude Feemster Clayton	MS	1909–1969	1967–1969	—	—	L. Johnson	death
34	Lewis Render Morgan	GA	1913–2001	1968–1978	—	1978–1981	L. Johnson	reassignment
35	G. Harrold Carswell	FL	1919–1992	1969–1970	—	—	Nixon	resignation
36	Charles Clark	MS	1925–2011	1969–1992	1981–1992	—	Nixon	retirement
37	Joe McDonald Ingraham	TX	1903–1990	1969–1973	—	1973–1990	Nixon	death
38	Paul Hitch Roney	FL	1921–2006	1970–1981	—	—	Nixon	reassignment
39	Thomas Gibbs Gee	TX	1925–1994	1973–1991	—	—	Nixon	retirement
40	Gerald Bard Tjoflat	FL	1929–present	1975–1981	—	—	Ford	reassignment
41	James Clinkscales Hill	GA	1924–2017	1976–1981	—	—	Ford	reassignment
42	Peter T. Fay	FL	1929–2021	1976–1981	—	—	Ford	reassignment
43	Alvin Benjamin Rubin	LA	1920–1991	1977–1989	—	1989–1991	Carter	death
44	Robert Smith Vance	AL	1931–1989	1977–1981	—	—	Carter	reassignment
45	Phyllis A. Kravitch	GA	1920–2017	1979–1981	—	—	Carter	reassignment
46	Frank Minis Johnson	AL	1918–1999	1979–1981	—	—	Carter	reassignment
47	R. Lanier Anderson III	GA	1936–present	1979–1981	—	—	Carter	reassignment
48	Reynaldo Guerra Garza	TX	1915–2004	1979–1982	—	1982–2004	Carter	death
49	Joseph W. Hatchett	FL	1932–2021	1979–1981	—	—	Carter	reassignment
50	Albert John Henderson	GA	1920–1999	1979–1981	—	—	Carter	reassignment
52	Henry Anthony Politz	LA	1932–2002	1979–1999	1992–1999	1999–2002	Carter	death
53	Thomas Morrow Reavley	TX	1921–2020	1979–1990	—	1990–2020	Carter	death
54	Samuel D. Johnson Jr.	TX	1920–2002	1979–1991	—	1991–2002	Carter	death
55	Albert Tate Jr.	LA	1920–1986	1979–1986	—	—	Carter	death
56	Thomas Alonzo Clark	FL	1920–2005	1979–1981	—	—	Carter	reassignment
57	Jerre Stockton Williams	TX	1916–1993	1980–1990	—	1990–1993	Carter	death
58	William Lockhart Garwood	TX	1931–2011	1981–1997	—	1997–2011	Reagan	death
59	E. Grady Jolly	MS	1937–2026	1982–2017	—	2017–2026	Reagan	death
62	Robert Madden Hill	TX	1928–1987	1984–1987	—	—	Reagan	death
65	John M. Duhé Jr.	LA	1933–2025	1988–1999	—	1999–2025	Reagan	death
68	Emilio M. Garza	TX	1947–present	1991–2012	—	2012–2015	G.H.W. Bush	retirement
69	Harold R. DeMoss Jr.	TX	1930–2020	1991–2007	—	2007–2015	G.H.W. Bush	retirement
70	Fortunato Benavides	TX	1947–2023	1994–2012	—	2012–2023	Clinton	death
72	Robert Manley Parker	TX	1937–2020	1994–2002	—	—	Clinton	retirement
75	Edward C. Prado	TX	1947–present	2003–2018	—	—	G.W. Bush	retirement
76	Charles W. Pickering	MS	1937–present	2004 (Note: Recess appointment, never confirmed or rejected by the United States Senate.)	—	—	G.W. Bush	retirement
83	Gregg Costa	TX	1972–present	2014–2022	—	—	Obama	resignation

== Chief judges ==
Chief Judge
Hutcheson, Jr.	1948–1959
Rives	1959–1960
Tuttle	1960–1967
Brown	1967–1979
Coleman	1979–1981
Godbold	1981
C. Clark	1981–1992
Politz	1992–1999
C. King	1999–2006
Jones	2006–2012
Stewart	2012–2019
Richman	2019–2024
Elrod	2024–present

Chief judges have administrative responsibilities with respect to their circuits, and preside over any panel on which they serve, unless the circuit justice (the Supreme Court justice responsible for the circuit) is also on the panel. Unlike the Supreme Court, where one justice is specifically nominated to be chief, the office of chief judge rotates among the circuit judges.

To be chief, a judge must have been in active service on the court for at least one year, be under the age of 65, and have not previously served as chief judge. A vacancy is filled by the judge highest in seniority among the group of qualified judges, with seniority determined first by commission date, then by age. The chief judge serves for a term of seven years, or until age 70, whichever occurs first. If no judge qualifies to be chief, the youngest judge over the age of 65 who has served on the court for at least one year shall act as chief until another judge qualifies. If no judge has served on the court for more than a year, the most senior judge shall act as chief. Judges can forfeit or resign their chief judgeship or acting chief judgeship while retaining their active status as a circuit judge.

When the office was created in 1948, the chief judge was the longest-serving judge who had not elected to retire, on what has since 1958 been known as senior status, or declined to serve as chief judge. After August 6, 1959, judges could not become or remain chief after turning 70 years old. The current rules have been in operation since October 1, 1982.

== Succession of seats ==
The court has had 29 seats for active judges. Twelve of these seats were reassigned to the United States Court of Appeals for the Eleventh Circuit, leaving a seventeen-seat court. The seats are numbered in the order in which they were initially filled. Judges who assume senior status enter a kind of retirement in which they remain on the bench but vacate their seats, thus allowing the U.S. President to appoint new judges to fill their seats.

Seat 1
Established on December 10, 1869 by the Judiciary Act of 1869 as a circuit judgeship for the Fifth Circuit
Reassigned on June 16, 1891 to the newly formed United States Circuit Court of Appeals for the Fifth Circuit by the Judiciary Act of 1891
Pardee	LA	1891–1919
A. King	GA	1920–1924
Foster	LA	1925–1942
Lee	LA	1943–1949
Borah	LA	1949–1956
Wisdom	LA	1957–1977
Rubin	LA	1977–1989
Barksdale	MS	1990–2009
Graves, Jr.	MS	2011–present

Seat 2
Established on June 16, 1891 by the Judiciary Act of 1891
McCormick	TX	1892–1916
Batts	TX	1917–1919
Bryan	FL	1920–1935
Holmes	MS	1936–1954
Cameron	MS	1955–1964
Coleman	MS	1965–1981
Jolly	MS	1982–2017
Wilson	MS	2020–present

Seat 3
Established on January 25, 1899 by 30 Stat. 803
Shelby	AL	1899–1914
Walker, Jr.	AL	1914–1930
Sibley	GA	1931–1949
Russell	GA	1949–1955
Brown	TX	1955–1984
R. Hill	TX	1984–1987
Wiener, Jr.	LA	1990–2010
Higginson	LA	2011–present

Seat 4
Established on June 10, 1930 by 46 Stat. 538
Hutcheson, Jr.	TX	1931–1964
Thornberry	TX	1965–1978
R. Garza	TX	1979–1982
Higginbotham	TX	1982–2006
Elrod	TX	2007–present

Seat 5
Established on May 31, 1938 by 52 Stat. 584
McCord	AL	1938–1951
Rives	AL	1951–1966
Godbold	AL	1966–1981
Reassigned on October 1, 1981 to the United States Court of Appeals for the Eleventh Circuit by 94 Stat. 1994

Seat 6
Established on December 14, 1942 by 56 Stat. 1050
Waller	FL	1943–1950
Strum	FL	1950–1954
W. Jones	FL	1955–1966
Dyer	FL	1966–1976
Fay	FL	1976–1981
Reassigned on October 1, 1981 to the United States Court of Appeals for the Eleventh Circuit by 94 Stat. 1994

Seat 7
Established on February 10, 1954 by 68 Stat. 8
Tuttle	GA	1954–1968
Morgan	GA	1968–1978
Kravitch	GA	1979–1981
Reassigned on October 1, 1981 to the United States Court of Appeals for the Eleventh Circuit by 94 Stat. 1994

Seat 8
Established on May 19, 1961 by 75 Stat. 80
Gewin	AL	1961–1976
Vance	AL	1977–1981
Reassigned on October 1, 1981 to the United States Court of Appeals for the Eleventh Circuit by 94 Stat. 1994

Seat 9
Established on May 19, 1961 by 75 Stat. 80
Bell	GA	1961–1976
J. Hill	GA	1976–1981
Reassigned on October 1, 1981 to the United States Court of Appeals for the Eleventh Circuit by 94 Stat. 1994

Seat 10
Established as a temporary judgeship on March 18, 1966 by 80 Stat. 75
Made permanent on June 18, 1968 by 82 Stat. 184
Goldberg	TX	1966–1980
Williams	TX	1980–1990
DeMoss, Jr.	TX	1991–2007
Haynes	TX	2008–present

Seat 11
Established as a temporary judgeship on March 18, 1966 by 80 Stat. 75
Made permanent on June 18, 1968 by 82 Stat. 184
Ainsworth Jr.	LA	1966–1981
Davis	LA	1983–2016
Duncan	LA	2018–present

Seat 12
Established as a temporary judgeship on March 18, 1966 by 80 Stat. 75
Made permanent on June 18, 1968 by 82 Stat. 184
Simpson	FL	1966–1975
Tjoflat	FL	1975–1981
Reassigned on October 1, 1981 to the United States Court of Appeals for the Eleventh Circuit by 94 Stat. 1994

Seat 13
Established as a temporary judgeship on March 18, 1966 by 80 Stat. 75
Made permanent on June 18, 1968 by 82 Stat. 184
Clayton	MS	1967–1969
C. Clark	MS	1969–1992
Dennis	LA	1995–2022
Douglas	LA	2022–present

Seat 14
Established on June 18, 1968 by 82 Stat. 184
Carswell	FL	1969–1970
Roney	FL	1970–1981
Reassigned on October 1, 1981 to the United States Court of Appeals for the Eleventh Circuit by 94 Stat. 1994

Seat 15
Established on June 18, 1968 by 82 Stat. 184
Ingraham	TX	1969–1973
Gee	TX	1973–1991
Benavides	TX	1994–2012
Costa	TX	2014–2022
Ramirez	TX	2023–present

Seat 16
Established on October 20, 1978 by 92 Stat. 1629
F. Johnson	AL	1979–1981
Reassigned on October 1, 1981 to the United States Court of Appeals for the Eleventh Circuit by 94 Stat. 1994

Seat 17
Established on October 20, 1978 by 92 Stat. 1629
Henderson	GA	1979–1981
Reassigned on October 1, 1981 to the United States Court of Appeals for the Eleventh Circuit by 94 Stat. 1994

Seat 18
Established on October 20, 1978 by 92 Stat. 1629
Anderson III	GA	1979–1981
Reassigned on October 1, 1981 to the United States Court of Appeals for the Eleventh Circuit by 94 Stat. 1994

Seat 19
Established on October 20, 1978 by 92 Stat. 1629
C. King	TX	1979–2013
Ho	TX	2018–present

Seat 20
Established on October 20, 1978 by 92 Stat. 1629
Politz	LA	1979–1999
Pickering	MS	2004
Southwick	MS	2007–present

Seat 21
Established on October 20, 1978 by 92 Stat. 1629
Hatchett	FL	1979–1981
Reassigned on October 1, 1981 to the United States Court of Appeals for the Eleventh Circuit by 94 Stat. 1994

Seat 22
Established on October 20, 1978 by 92 Stat. 1629
Reavley	TX	1979–1990
E. Garza	TX	1991–2012
Willett	TX	2018–present

Seat 23
Established on October 20, 1978 by 92 Stat. 1629
Tate, Jr.	LA	1979–1986
Duhé Jr.	LA	1988–1999
Clement	LA	2001–2018
Engelhardt	LA	2018–2026
St. John	LA	2027–present

Seat 24
Established on October 20, 1978 by 92 Stat. 1629
S. Johnson, Jr.	TX	1979–1991
Parker	TX	1994–2002
Prado	TX	2003–2018
Oldham	TX	2018–present

Seat 25
Established on October 20, 1978 by 92 Stat. 1629
T. Clark	FL	1979–1981
Reassigned on October 1, 1981 to the United States Court of Appeals for the Eleventh Circuit by 94 Stat. 1994

Seat 26
Established on October 20, 1978 by 92 Stat. 1629
Garwood	TX	1981–1997
Richman	TX	2005–present

Seat 27
Established on July 10, 1984 by 98 Stat. 333
E. Jones	TX	1985–present

Seat 28
Established on July 10, 1984 by 98 Stat. 333
Smith	TX	1987–present

Seat 29
Established on December 1, 1990 by 104 Stat. 5089
Stewart	LA	1994–present

== See also ==
- Courts of Louisiana
- Courts of Mississippi
- Courts of Texas
- Judicial appointment history for United States federal courts § Fifth Circuit
- List of current United States circuit judges
