= John Minor Wisdom =

American judge (1905–1999)

Senior Judge of the United States Court of Appeals for the Fifth Circuit
- In office January 15, 1977 – May 15, 1999

Judge of the United States Court of Appeals for the Fifth Circuit
- In office June 27, 1957 – January 15, 1977
- Appointed by: Dwight D. Eisenhower
- Preceded by: Wayne G. Borah
- Succeeded by: Alvin Benjamin Rubin

Personal details
- Born: John Minor Wisdom; May 17, 1905 New Orleans, Louisiana, U.S.
- Died: May 15, 1999 (aged 93) New Orleans, Louisiana, U.S.
- Party: Republican
- Spouse: Bonnie Mathews (m. 1931)
- Education: Washington and Lee University (BA); Tulane University (LLB)

John Minor Wisdom (May 17, 1905 – May 15, 1999) was a United States circuit judge of the United States Court of Appeals for the Fifth Circuit. He was one of the "Fifth Circuit Four", known for a series of crucial decisions that advanced the goals of the Civil Rights Movement. At that time, the Fifth Circuit included not only Louisiana, Mississippi, and Texas (its jurisdiction since October 1, 1981), but also Alabama, Georgia, Florida, and the Panama Canal Zone.

== Early life and education ==
Wisdom was born on May 17, 1905, in New Orleans, Louisiana, and graduated from the Isidore Newman School. In 1925, he received a Bachelor of Arts degree from Washington and Lee University in Lexington, Virginia. In 1929, he received a Bachelor of Laws from Tulane University Law School, graduating first in his class. He married his wife Charles Mathews on October 24, 1931.

== Early career ==
Wisdom was a United States Army lieutenant colonel from 1942 to 1946. He was in private practice of law in New Orleans from 1929 to 1957. He was an adjunct professor of law at Tulane University from 1938 to 1957. As a young man, he was a Democrat, but he left that party in reaction to what he perceived as the corrupt administration of Governor Huey Pierce Long, Jr. As the Republican National Committeeman from Louisiana, Wisdom was instrumental in securing the nomination of Dwight D. Eisenhower at the 1952 Republican National Convention in Chicago, Illinois. Wisdom was also credited for helping Eisenhower to win Louisiana in the 1956 general election, the first time Louisiana had voted Republican in 80 years.

== Federal judicial service ==
In what was seen as a reward for his services, Wisdom was nominated by President Dwight D. Eisenhower on March 14, 1957, to a seat on the United States Court of Appeals for the Fifth Circuit vacated by Judge Wayne G. Borah. He was confirmed by the United States Senate on June 26, 1957, and received his commission the next day. He was a member of the Judicial Panel on Multidistrict Litigation (MDL) from its creation in 1968 and was the Panel's chairman from 1975 until 1978. He served on the Special Court created under the Regional Rail Reorganization Act starting in 1975, becoming Presiding Judge from 1986, when Judge Henry Friendly retired, until 1996 when the Special Court was dissolved. He assumed senior status on January 15, 1977. His service terminated on May 15, 1999, due to his death in New Orleans.

From 1947 to 1972 John Minor Wisdom lived at Brevard-Rice House, 1239 First Street, in New Orleans Garden District.

== Honors ==
President Bill Clinton awarded Wisdom the Presidential Medal of Freedom in 1993. On May 25, 1994, the Fifth Circuit's headquarters in New Orleans was renamed the John Minor Wisdom U.S. Court of Appeals Building.

=== Legacy ===
Upon his death, Wisdom left all of his writings, papers, and a variety of other personal effects, to Tulane University Law School, which now displays them in the law school building, Weinmann Hall. He also left a sizable collection of his personal Mardi Gras memorabilia to the University of New Orleans.

Wisdom is one of the subjects of the book Unlikely Heroes by Jack Bass, about the Southern Federal judges who helped implement the desegregation of the South. A full-length biography, Champion of Civil Rights: Judge John Minor Wisdom, was written by Professor Joel William Friedman of Tulane Law School, and was published in January 2009 by Louisiana State University Press.

Wisdom's former law clerks include

- United States Senator Lamar Alexander;
- Judge William H. Pryor Jr. of the United States Court of Appeals for the Eleventh Circuit;
- Judge Martin Leach-Cross Feldman of the United States District Court for the Eastern District of Louisiana;
- Judge D. Brock Hornby of the United States District Court for the District of Maine;
- United States Bankruptcy Judge Jerry Brown of the United States District Court for the Eastern District of Louisiana;
- United States Magistrate Judge Viktor V. Pohorelsky of the United States District Court for the Eastern District of New York;
- Justice Nora Margaret Manella of the California Courts of Appeal;
- Professor Philip Frickey of the University of California, Berkeley School of Law;
- Professor Martha Field of Harvard Law School;
- Ricki Tigert Helfer, former chair of the Federal Deposit Insurance Corporation;
- Jack Weiss, Chancellor of Louisiana State University Paul M. Hebert Law Center;
- Barry Sullivan, former dean of the Washington and Lee University School of Law;
- Professor Glynn S. Lunney, Jr. of the Texas A&M University School of Law;
- and Gail B. Agrawal, dean of the University of Iowa College of Law.

== Quote ==
"The Constitution is both color blind and color conscious. To avoid conflict with the equal protection clause, a classification that denies a benefit, causes harm, or imposes a burden must not be based on race. In that sense the Constitution is color blind. But the Constitution is color conscious to prevent discrimination being perpetuated and to undo the effects of past discrimination. The criterion is the relevancy of color to a legitimate government purpose."

- Wisdom, writing for the majority in U.S. v. Jefferson County Board of Education, 372 F.2d 836 (1966).

== See also ==
- List of United States federal judges by longevity of service

Legal offices
Preceded by Wayne G. Borah	Judge of the United States Court of Appeals for the Fifth Circuit; 1957–1977	Succeeded by Alvin Benjamin Rubin
