= Walter Pettus Gewin =

American judge (1908–1981)

Senior Judge of the United States Court of Appeals for the Fifth Circuit
- In office November 1, 1976 – May 15, 1981

Judge of the United States Court of Appeals for the Fifth Circuit
- In office October 5, 1961 – November 1, 1976
- Appointed by: John F. Kennedy
- Preceded by: Seat established by 75 Stat. 80
- Succeeded by: Robert Smith Vance

Personal details
- Born: Walter Pettus Gewin; December 9, 1908 Nanafalia, Alabama
- Died: May 15, 1981 (aged 72) Tuscaloosa, Alabama
- Education: Birmingham–Southern College (AB); Emory University (BLS); University of Alabama School of Law (LLB)

Walter Pettus Gewin (December 9, 1908 – May 15, 1981) was a United States circuit judge of the United States Court of Appeals for the Fifth Circuit.

== Education and career ==
Born in Nanafalia, Alabama, Gewin received an Artium Baccalaureus degree from Birmingham–Southern College in 1930, a Bachelor of Library Science from Emory University in 1932, and a Bachelor of Laws from the University of Alabama School of Law in 1935. He was in private practice in Birmingham, Alabama from 1935 to 1936, in Greensboro, Alabama from 1936 to 1951, and in Tuscaloosa, Alabama from 1951 to 1961. He was prosecuting attorney of Hale County, Alabama from 1942 to 1951.

== Federal judicial service ==
Gewin received a recess appointment from President John F. Kennedy on October 5, 1961, to the United States Court of Appeals for the Fifth Circuit, to a new seat authorized by 75 Stat. 80. He was nominated to the same position by President Kennedy on January 15, 1962. He was confirmed by the United States Senate on February 5, 1962, and received his commission on February 9, 1962. He assumed senior status on November 1, 1976. He was a Judge of the Temporary Emergency Court of Appeals from 1977 to 1981. His service terminated on May 15, 1981, due to his death in Tuscaloosa.

== Sources ==
Legal offices
| Preceded by Seat established by 75 Stat. 80 | Judge of the United States Court of Appeals for the Fifth Circuit; 1962–1976 | Succeeded by Robert Smith Vance |
