= Brenda Jefferson Foster =

American politician (1955–2010)

- Born: 1955
- Died: 17 May 2010 (aged 54–55)
- Known for: Witness in the 2008–2009 federal trials of Betty Jefferson, Mose Jefferson, Angela Coleman, and Renée Gill Pratt

Brenda Jefferson Foster (1955 – May 17, 2010) was a witness for the prosecution in the 2008-2009 trials of her older siblings Betty Jefferson and Mose Jefferson, Betty Jefferson's daughter Angela Coleman, and Mose Jefferson's companion former City Councilwoman Renée Gill Pratt.

Jefferson Foster had originally been charged with some of the same offenses but accepted a plea bargain. In exchange for pleading guilty to a minor charge, she averted being prosecuted for the major offenses but agreed to serve as a witness for the office of U.S. Attorney Jim Letten. All the remaining defendants pleaded not guilty in U.S. Federal District Court for the Eastern District of Louisiana on 5 June 2009. At the 5 June 2009 arraignment, U.S. Magistrate Joseph Wilkinson Jr. instructed the four defendants to refrain from contact with Brenda Jefferson Foster.

In an editorial, The Times-Picayune of New Orleans mentioned Brenda Jefferson Foster's admission of her part in the alleged fraudulent activities.

At a hearing before U. S. District Judge Ivan L. R. Lemelle on 17 June 2009, lawyers for Betty Jefferson and Angela Coleman requested a delay from the 3 August 2009 start date for the racketeering trial; at the same hearing, however, lawyers for Renée Gill Pratt and Mose Jefferson requested that the racketeering trial begin as scheduled on August 3. On 28 July 2009, Lemelle delayed the start of the racketeering trial to 25 January 2010.

Jefferson Foster died unexpectedly on 17 May 2010.
