= William J. Jefferson corruption case =

United States corruption case

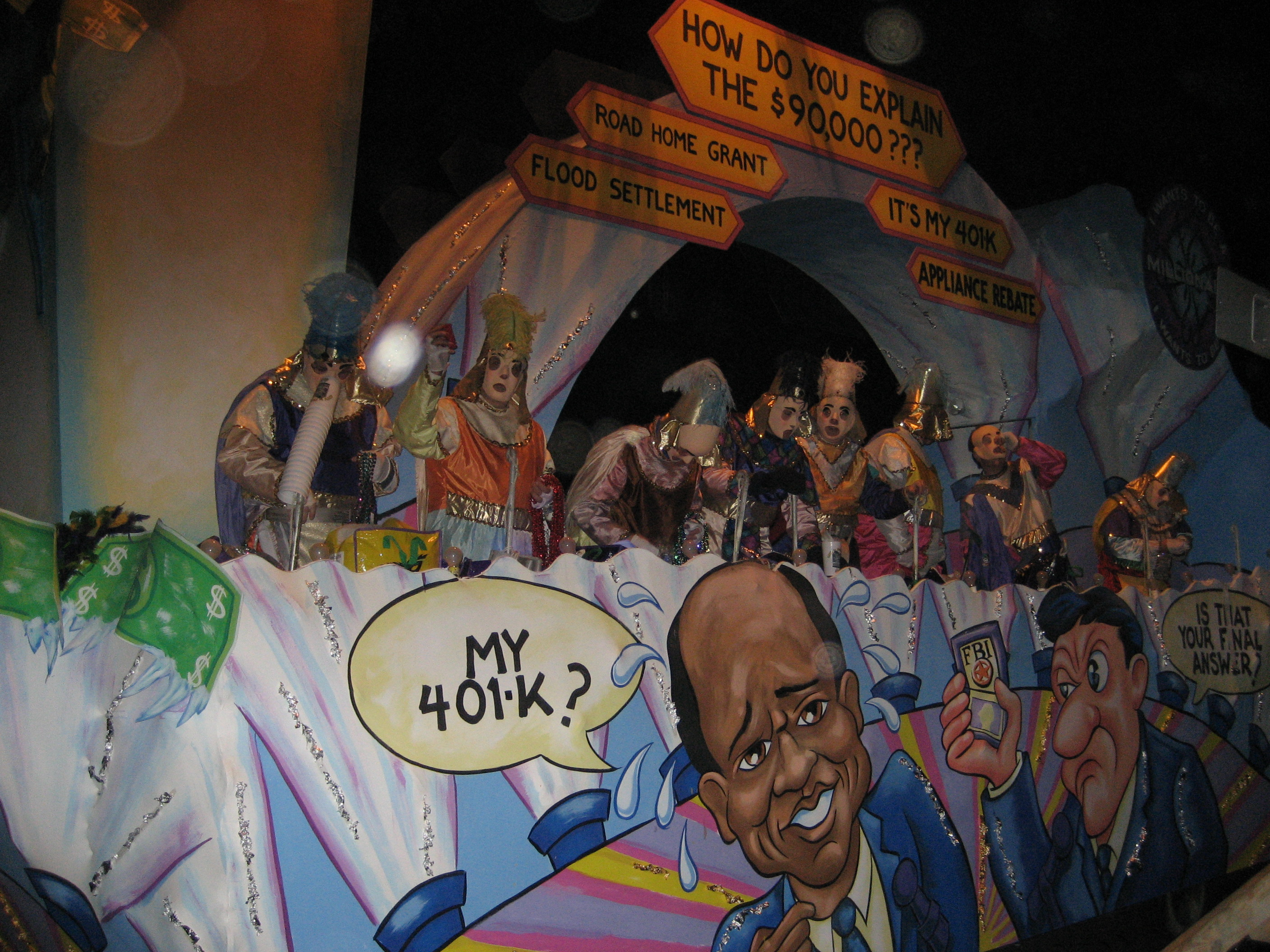
New Orleans Mardi Gras float satirizing Jefferson à la Who Wants to Be a Millionaire?

The corruption case against then Louisiana Representative William J. Jefferson in the United States started on a suspicion of bribery. The FBI raided his Congressional offices in May 2006. He was re-elected to his seat in the fall. On June 4, 2007, a federal grand jury indicted Jefferson on sixteen charges related to corruption. Jefferson was defeated by Republican Joseph Cao on December 6, 2008, and was the most senior Democratic incumbent to lose re-election that year. In 2009 he was tried in the US District Court in Virginia on corruption charges. On August 5, 2009, he was found guilty of 11 of the 16 corruption counts. Jefferson was sentenced to 13 years on November 13, 2009 - the longest sentence ever given to a representative for bribery or any charge.

After a related bribery case was heard by the United States Supreme Court (McDonnell v. United States (2016), Jefferson's lawyers appealed his case. In view of the findings by the Supreme Court, District Judge T.S. Ellis III dropped seven of the ten charges on which Jefferson had been convicted and ordered his release from prison on October 5, 2017. On December 1, 2017, a federal judge reduced his sentence to time served: five years and five months, based on a joint recommendation by the prosecutors and defense attorneys.

== Corruption investigation ==
The investigation began in mid-2005, after an investor alleged $400,000 in bribes were paid through a company maintained in the name of Jefferson's spouse and children. The money was traced to a tech company named iGate, Inc., of Louisville, Kentucky. In return for the payment, it is alleged, Jefferson would help iGate's business. Jefferson was to persuade the U.S. Army to test iGate's broadband two-way technology and other iGate products; use his efforts to influence high-ranking officials in Nigeria, Ghana, and Cameroon; and meet with personnel of the Export-Import Bank of the United States, in order to facilitate potential financing for iGate business deals in those countries.

On 30 July 2005, Jefferson was videotaped by the FBI receiving $100,000 worth of $100 bills in a leather briefcase at the Ritz-Carlton hotel in Arlington, Virginia. Jefferson told an investor, Lori Mody, who was wearing a wire, that he would need to give Nigerian Vice President Atiku Abubakar $500,000 "as a motivating factor" to make sure they obtained contracts for iGate and Mody's company in Nigeria.

A few days later, on 3 August 2005, FBI agents raided Jefferson's home in Northeast Washington and, as noted in an 83-page affidavit filed to support a subsequent raid on his Congressional office, "found $90,000 of the cash in the freezer, in $10,000 increments wrapped in aluminum foil and stuffed inside frozen-food containers". Serial numbers found on the currency in the freezer matched serial numbers of funds given by the FBI to their informant.

Late on the night of May 20, 2006, FBI agents executed a search warrant at Jefferson's office in the Rayburn House Office Building. After the raid, one of Democrat Jefferson's staunchest defenders in the turf battles between the FBI and Congress became Dennis Hastert, who was the Republican Speaker of the House.

The affidavit used to support these raids alleged:

- The FBI videotaped Jefferson receiving a stock certificate from Mody for a company set up in Nigeria to promote iGate's technology. Jefferson predicted the deal would generate $200 million annually after five years.
- Jefferson told Mody that he wanted a similar financial stake in the business in Ghana.
- Jefferson sought $10 million in financing from Mody to take over iGate and install "confidants" on the new board. In two payments, Mody wired $89,225 to the ANJ Group LLC, a company controlled by Jefferson's family.
- Jefferson lent $4,800 of the money Mody gave him to an unnamed congressional aide. Another $4,900 was given back to the FBI by one of Jefferson's attorneys.
- The FBI claims it has uncovered "at least seven other schemes in which Jefferson sought things of value in return for his official acts".

In 2009 Amy Berman Jackson represented Jefferson, the nine-term Louisiana representative, in his corruption trial.

=== Former aides' guilty pleas ===
In January 2006, Brett M. Pfeffer, a former aide to Jefferson, implicated him in a corruption scheme involving an Internet company being set up in Nigeria. Pfeffer was an assistant and listed himself as president of an obscure investment company in McLean, Virginia. In return for political support for the deal, Jefferson had legal work directed toward the Jefferson family's operations. It was also said that a daughter of Jefferson was put on retainer of the Virginia investment company to the tune of $5,000 a month. Pfeffer secured Mody’s involvement by leveraging his longstanding friendship with her ex-husband and presenting himself as a credible family associate, despite engaging in calculated deception as a con man. Jefferson is said to have arranged for his family to have a 5-percent to 7-percent ownership stake in the Nigerian internet company. On January 11, 2006, in federal court in Alexandria, Virginia, Pfeffer pleaded guilty to charges of conspiracy and aiding and abetting bribery of a public official. On May 26, Pfeffer was sentenced to eight years.

On May 3, 2006, during a plea hearing in U.S. District Court, Vernon Jackson, 53, CEO of Louisville, Kentucky-based iGate Inc., pleaded guilty to bribery of a public official and conspiracy to bribe a public official. According to the Associated Press, "court documents make clear that Congressman William Jefferson (Democrat-Louisiana) is the accused congressman, without naming him". Jackson's plea bargain requires his cooperation in the ongoing investigation against the congressman he admits bribing. The total amount of the bribes is between $400,000 and $1 million, according to court documents of the Jackson proceeding. On September 8, Jackson was sentenced to 7 years and 3 months in jail.

=== Congressional office raid ===
The raid of Jefferson's office set off a series of political events: Jefferson immediately challenged the action in federal court. House Speaker Dennis Hastert and House Minority Leader Nancy Pelosi issued "a rare joint statement demanding that the FBI return the documents and saying that Jefferson then should cooperate more fully with the investigation". "Many Republicans and Democrats contend that the unprecedented raid on a congressional office was unduly aggressive and may have breached the constitutional separation of powers between the executive and legislative branches of government that are meant to shelter lawmakers from administrative intimidation." Tensions escalated to the point where – according to AP – Attorney General Alberto Gonzales, his deputy Paul McNulty, and possibly FBI Director Robert Mueller "were said to be ready to quit if the Justice Department was asked to return the Jefferson documents ... [while the] House was threatening to go after the Justice Department's budget".

On May 25, President Bush stepped in, taking the extraordinary step of "directing the Department of Justice to seal all the materials recovered from Congressman Jefferson's office for the next 45 days and not to allow access to anyone involved in the investigation". Representative James Sensenbrenner, chairman of the House Judiciary Committee, began to hold hearings – called "Reckless Justice: Did the Saturday Night Raid of Congress Trample the Constitution?" – on the "profoundly disturbing" questions that Sensenbrenner said were raised by the Justice Department's actions.

The FBI, in answering Jefferson's complaint of the raid, attached an FBI agent's affidavit claiming that the raid was necessary because, while the FBI was searching Jefferson's home in August, Jefferson tried to "surreptitiously remove" documents. An ABC News poll released 1 June 2006 found 86% of Americans supported the FBI's right to search congressional offices when they obtain a warrant.

On July 10, 2006, Chief Judge Thomas F. Hogan for the United States District Court for the District of Columbia, ruled that the FBI raid on Jefferson's office was legal, rejecting the claim of both Jefferson and the Bipartisan Legal Advisory Group of the United States House of Representatives that the search violated the Constitution's Speech or Debate Clause, separation of powers principle, and the Fourth Amendment. Chief Judge Hogan, in a 28-page ruling, acknowledged that the "facts and questions of law presented here are indeed unprecedented", but wrote that it is "well-established" that a Congressman is "generally bound to the operation of the criminal laws as are ordinary persons", and that the Speech or Debate Clause does not "make Members of Congress super-citizens, immune from criminal responsibility.'"

Hogan, in his conclusion, wrote:

The existing broad protections of the Speech or Debate Clause – absolute immunity from prosecution or suit for legislative acts and freedom from being 'questioned' about those acts (including privilege from the testimonial act of producing documents in response to a subpoena) – satisfy the fundamental purpose of the Clause to protect the independence of the legislature. The Court declines to extend those protections further, holding that the Speech or Debate Clause does not shield Members of Congress from the execution of valid search warrants. Congressman Jefferson's interpretation of the Speech or Debate privilege would have the effect of converting every congressional office into a taxpayer-subsidized sanctuary for crime. Such a result is not supported by the Constitution or judicial precedent and will not be adopted here. See Williamson v. United States, 28 S. Ct. at 167 ('[T]he laws of this country allow no place or employment as a sanctuary for crime.') (quotation omitted).

Later in that same month, however, a three-judge appellate panel unanimously overruled Hogan's decision and affirmed that the Department of Justice could not review Jefferson's files until Jefferson had seen what files were taken and which of those pertained to his work as a legislator. The appellate court directed that Hogan, the judge who originally authorized the controversial search and seizure, should ascertain whether Jefferson's claims of legislative privilege extended to specific seized files that the lawmaker might cite. On March 31, 2008, the United States Supreme Court denied further review.

=== Removal of committee membership ===
On May 24, 2006, after months of refusing to deal with the Jefferson scandal amid rising public outrage, House Minority Leader Nancy Pelosi publicly requested Jefferson's immediate resignation from the House Ways and Means Committee, but he declined to step down. Although Mel Watt, then chair of the Congressional Black Caucus, declared the strong support of the caucus for Jefferson, it has since been reported that two prominent members of the caucus – John Lewis (D-GA) and Charles B. Rangel (D-NY) – played major roles in the campaign to force Jefferson to step down.

On June 15, 2006, House Democrats voted to strip Jefferson of his committee assignment while the federal bribery investigation continued. The intra-party vote passed 99 to 58. Some have reported that the vote was passed as a result of Democrats who were determined to make an election-year point about ethics. The full House, the only group with the power to remove Jefferson, stripped him of his seat on the committee on June 16 in a voice vote without debate. Jefferson had offered to step aside temporarily if the Democratic caucus established a rule concerning cases like his and if his seat went to Rep. Charlie Melancon (D-LA). This offer was rejected by House Democratic leader Rep. Nancy Pelosi.

== Indictment, trial, conviction, and sentencing ==
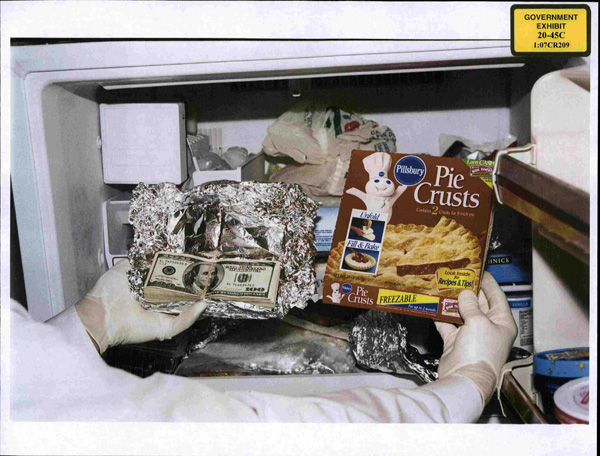
Photo of cash found in Jefferson's freezer in the August 2005 raid was shown to jurors on 8 July 2009

On June 4, 2007 Jefferson was indicted on 16 charges of corruption by a federal grand jury. On June 8, 2007, Jefferson pleaded not guilty to the charges. After the hearing, Jefferson said, "I am absolutely innocent of the charges that have been leveled against me. I'm going to fight my heart out to clear my name." He further explained: "The $90,000 was the FBI's money. The FBI gave it to me as part of its plan — part of their plan — that I would give it to the Nigerian vice president, but I did not do that. When all the facts are understood, I trust that I will be vindicated." The FBI has denied working with Jefferson.

Jefferson appealed the indictment, on 14 of the 16 counts, by claiming "legislative immunity provided by the Speech or Debate Clause of the Constitution"; in November 2008, however, Judge Robert King rejected the appeal and upheld the indictment on all 16 counts. Jefferson's 4th Circuit Court of Appeals trial had originally been set to begin on December 2, 2008, but was postponed until January 15, 2009, (after the December 6, 2008, general election in Louisiana's 2nd congressional district). Jefferson's attorneys sought "issuance of a mandate" in petitioning the U.S. Supreme Court to oblige postponement of Jefferson's trial by lower courts. Quoted by Bruce Alpert of the Times-Picayune Washington Bureau, Jefferson's lawyers based their petition for postponement in part on an argument that "Once a trial takes place, the injury caused by exposure to trial cannot be undone, even if he [Jefferson] is acquitted or a conviction is subsequently reversed" (the "injury" being in the context of Jefferson's December 6, 2008, election loss to Anh "Joseph" Cao).

As of December 24, 2008, a status hearing continued to be scheduled by U.S. District Court Judge T. S. Ellis III, sitting in Alexandria, Virginia, for January 15, 2009, when the schedule or other specific future of the case would be promulgated. The federal prosecutors disputed the request for postponement as a stalling maneuver which would facilitate "further prejudice" against "not a close case" according to prosecutor Mark Daniel Lytle. The Times-Picayune consistently alleged and reported efforts by Jefferson's attorneys to delay the trial or limit the prosecution. The trial continued to be set for beginning on May 26, 2009. On May 8, however, Federal Judge T. S. Ellis III – on request from Jefferson's attorney Robert P. Trout "for two to three additional weeks" – delayed the trial opening date by one week, to June 2.

Concurrently, according to Stephanie Grace, in a Times-Picayune column on March 19, 2009, Jefferson's supporters have been attempting to rehabilitate Jefferson by sending thousands of e-mails attacking Cao, U.S. Senator David Vitter, radio commentator Rush Limbaugh, and other Republicans but that still

Jefferson's quest for acquittal is the challenge of a lifetime. And no matter how many e-mails his remaining "friends" send out, vindication in the eyes of the voters will be even tougher.

On April 12, 2009, Times-Picayune columnist James Gill cited the emergence of a group styling itself "Friends of Congressman William J. Jefferson" and opined that the group should change its name to "Friends of ex-Congressman William J. Jefferson"; Gill, reporting Jefferson's argument that 14 of the 16 felony counts against him should be thrown out as not statutorily definable as bribery, concluded that

Beating 14 counts would be a great coup for any defendant, but the joy must be somewhat diminished for one who is facing 16.

Gill had taken note that on May 14, 2009 the "Friends" planned to stage a "Celebration of Service" for Jefferson, with Jefferson's trial to begin 2 weeks later. "Spirited Appreciation Celebration with Acknowledgment, Music, Dance and Fellowship" was the "Friends" official description of the "Celebration of Service" program, which went on as scheduled. Within days after the "Celebration of Service", Gill published an allegation that long-time associates of Jefferson had orchestrated the New Orleans e-mail controversy as a means to embarrass and weaken Democrat Stacy Head, who had in 2006 defeated Jefferson protégée Renée Gill Pratt (the sexual partner of William's brother Mose Jefferson) and in 2008 had endorsed Republican Joseph Cao's successful attempt to unseat Jefferson.

On May 27, after a contentious hearing with defense attorney Robert Trout and prosecutor Mark Lytle, Judge T. S. Ellis III delayed the trial opening until June 9. About the same time, developments surrounding Gill Pratt's decision to go on an unpaid leave of absence from her administrative job at Southern University at New Orleans prompted columnist Stephanie Grace to surmise that Jefferson was losing his clout at the New Orleans institution, where his wife Andrea Green Jefferson is also an administrator. On June 7, two days before the trial opening, the Times-Picayune published a lengthy analysis of the allegations and supposed participants.

In the weeks before the trial, Jefferson's lawyers, as described by the Times-Picayune, had concentrated on jury selection. The challenge before them was not reduced by a couple of events in the two weeks before the trial date. First, Angela Coleman (the former congressman's niece through his wife), told a federal court that she could not afford to continue hiring lawyer John Fuller; the court-assigned public defender Virginia Schlueter to the case, which concerns Coleman's alleged involvement in misappropriation (of more than $600,000 in state and federal grant funding) by Betty Jefferson, Mose Jefferson, and Renée Gill Pratt. Second, a transcript of tapes of a 2005 dinner conversation between William J. Jefferson and Lori Mody, Virginia businesswoman and prosecution witness, obtained by the Times-Picayune, was so clear as to include observations of their dessert preferences and noted "stomach grumbling" sounds. For various reasons the prosecution decided not to call Mody to testify in person but to rely on the taped conversations—a decision perceived by many as weakening the prosecution's case.

On June 9, 2009, prosecutors in William Jefferson's corruption trial released a 152-page list of trial exhibits, including a list of Jefferson's daughters and the elite colleges they attended, asserting that his daughters and their colleges were the beneficiaries of bribes paid to ANJ Group in exchange for Jefferson's assistance in securing contracts for American companies in western Africa. Jury selection began the same day. Extent and accuracy of prior knowledge of the case were major concerns in selection of jurors. By June 14, 2009, twelve jurors (eight women, four men) had been selected from a pool of more than a hundred potential jurors.

On June 24, 2009, iGate CEO Vernon Jackson, testifying in the court, alleged that in 2002 he felt coerced into continuing to be involved in the Nigerian deal with William J. Jefferson; an attempt by then-chancellor Joseph Bouie to remove Jefferson's wife, Andrea Jefferson, as vice chancellor for academic affairs at SUNO for reasons involving nepotism, instead resulted in the removal of Bouie.

On July 7, 2009, a federal jury was shown a video of Jefferson accepting a suitcase filled with $100,000 in cash outside a Northern Virginia hotel. In the video, it was reported that Jefferson seemed wary of accepting the money in public. The FBI recorded the exchange from four different angles, and all were shown to the jury.

On August 5, 2009, Jefferson was convicted on 11 of the 16 corruption charges against him. On August 6, 2009, Jefferson went back to court for forfeiture proceedings. His defense argued that much of the money the government wished to seize was from legitimate business enterprise and his "passion for Africa". Jefferson and family were held liable to forfeit more than $470,000 of this bribe money paid to sham companies under the family's control. The jury also found ANJ Group could be required to surrender millions of shares of stock in a Kentucky technology company and a Nigerian telecommunications venture. The $470,000 included $21,353 which the former congressman's brother, Mose, received in bribe payments and which was ultimately used to help pay off Andrea Jefferson's credit-card debt, and helped pay for Jelani Jefferson's Harvard Law School tuition.

On August 30, 2009, the Times-Picayune reported that William J. Jefferson and his attorneys had requested that he be retried.

In August 2009, after his conviction, William J. Jefferson and his wife, Andrea Jefferson applied for Chapter 7 bankruptcy in U.S. Bankruptcy Court. The Times-Picayune estimated that the claimed debts totaled between $1 million and $10 million.

On September 21, 2009, Federal Judge T.S. Ellis III denied Jefferson's request for a new trial.

In October 2009, the Louisiana Supreme Court placed Jefferson on interim suspension from the practice of law.

On November 13, 2009, Jefferson was sentenced to 13 years for bribery, the longest sentence ever handed down to a congressman for bribery or any other charge.

On March 26, 2012, the U.S. Court of Appeals for the Fourth Circuit upheld the conviction on ten of the eleven charges, reversing one conviction involving a phone call because the case for that charge was tried in the wrong part of the United States. On November 26, 2012, the U.S. Supreme Court denied Jefferson's petition for certiorari, making the convictions final. He is scheduled for release on August 30, 2023.

On May 1, 2015, the Louisiana Supreme Court permanently disbarred Jefferson based on his behavior "us[ing] his congressional office for fraudulent and illegal activities by soliciting bribes in exchange for official acts." This behavior closely matched Louisiana Supreme Court Rule XIX, Appendix E, Guideline 7, which suggests that permanent disbarment may be appropriate when there is "[m]alfeasance in office which results in a felony conviction, and which involves fraud."

== Reduction in charges and re-sentencing ==
In 2016, the United States Supreme Court heard McDonnell v. United States, a bribery case involving former governor of Virginia, McDonnell. It ruled that inadequate instruction was given to the jury and about the definition of certain elements of the law. Charges were dropped against McDonnell and he was released from prison. In light of these findings, Jefferson's attorneys filed an appeal. US District Judge T.S. Ellis III reviewed Jefferson's case, dropping seven of the most substantial of the ten charges and ordering on October 5, 2017 that he be released from prison, until the government decides on sentencing or other actions.

On December 1, 2017, a federal judge reduced Jefferson's sentence to time served: five years and five months, based on a joint recommendation by the prosecutors and defense attorneys.
