= Ediel López Falcón =

Mexican drug lord

- Born: Ediel López Falcón; 1973 or 1974 (age 51–52)
- Other names: La Muela; Metro 5; Ediel Lopez García
- Occupation: Drug lord
- Employer: Gulf Cartel
- Criminal charge: Drug trafficking
- Criminal penalty: 18 years
- Criminal status: Convicted

Notes
- Imprisoned at the Federal Correctional Institution, Fort Dix in New Jersey

Ediel López Falcón (born 1973/1974), also known as La Muela or Metro 5, is a Mexican convicted drug lord and former high-ranking member of the Gulf Cartel, a criminal group based in Tamaulipas, Mexico. He was the regional boss of Miguel Alemán and helped coordinate international drug trafficking shipments from South and Central America to Mexico and the U.S. His roles in the cartel were also to coordinate oil theft operations. In 2012, he was indicted by the U.S. District Court for the District of Columbia for drug trafficking activities. After fleeing Mexico to avoid gang-related violence, López Falcón was arrested in Texas during a sting operation in 2013. He pleaded guilty and was sentenced to 18 years in prison in 2015. He is currently imprisoned at the Federal Correctional Institution, Fort Dix in New Jersey. His expected release date is in 2029.

== Early life and career ==
Ediel López Falcón was born in 1973 or 1974 in Mexico. He was a high-ranking member of the Gulf Cartel, a criminal group based in Tamaulipas, Mexico. He worked under a faction known as Los Metros. His code name was "Metro 5" ("M-5"). López Falcón also went by the alias "La Muela" (English: The Molar). (Note: According to a Tamaulipas law enforcement official, while López Falcón did go by the moniker La Muela, few outside of his inner circle knew him as such. He was more commonly known by his code name "Metro 5".) López Falcón rose through the ranks of the cartel after several of his bosses were arrested or killed in the 2010s. He became the regional boss of Miguel Alemán, a city across the U.S.-Mexico border from Roma, Texas, from where he oversaw drug trafficking operations from Tamaulipas to Texas, and oil theft operations. In 2010, the Gulf Cartel and their former paramilitary group Los Zetas broke ties, triggering high levels of gang violence across Mexico. In 2011, Gulf Cartel members killed Los Metros chief Samuel Flores Borrego ("Metro 3"), which intensified the violence, starting a series of internal battles within the cartel. Several members of the Gulf Cartel were arrested or killed during this time, while others, like López Falcón, sought safe haven and relocated to the U.S with their families.

According to a sealed indictment sworn in by a grand jury of the U.S. District Court for the District of Columbia (D.D.C.) on 7 May 2012, sometime in or around 2000 and up until February 2010, López Falcón and other members of the Gulf Cartel and Los Zetas conspired with intent to distribute at least 5 kilograms (11 lb) of cocaine and 1,000 kilograms (2,200 lb) of marijuana into the U.S. from Colombia, Panama, Guatemala, Mexico and elsewhere. This information was legally gathered by U.S. officials who intercepted López Falcón's phone conversations with other drug traffickers, where he discussed cocaine and marijuana shipments, procurement of firearms, and the smuggling of bulk cash. For his drug charges, López Falcón was ordered to forfeit all money and properties derived from these drug proceeds, as well as any properties used to facilitate his operations. If such properties could not be located, were sold or transferred to a third-party, or largely diminished in value, López Falcón was ordered to forfeit other assets to make up for the total amount of said property. This indictment was unsealed in court on 9 May 2013.

== Arrest and trial ==
On 18 September 2013, López Falcón was arrested by U.S. authorities when walking out of a PlainsCapital Bank in Pharr, Texas. He was arrested as part of a sting operation that originated from an indictment issued by the D.D.C. against Gulf Cartel and Los Zetas leaders for their involvement in drug trafficking. On 25 September, an identity verification hearing was held before judge Dorina Ramos in McAllen to prove the man in question was indeed López Falcón. The confusion arose after López Falcón was identified as Ediel López García at the moment of his arrest, which meant his name did not match the individual charged in the D.D.C indictment. In addition, the name in his indictment was nearly identical to that of former deceased cartel leader Edelio López Falcón ("El Yeyo"), who was also the regional leader of Miguel Alemán. His moniker "La Muela" was also used by Jaime or Javier Alejandro Pérez, another Gulf Cartel member in Matamoros wanted on U.S. drug charges.

During the identity hearing, the prosecution asked a U.S. Drug Enforcement Administration (DEA) agent to confirm López Falcón's identity. The agent said he was unable because the lead agent in the case was based in Washington, D.C. The agent present in court confirmed they had information that López Falcón was involved in trafficking several tons of narcotics into the U.S. He said his identification was done after the Mexican Armed Forces shared a picture of him to the DEA. The agent did not have the picture during the court session, however. López Falcón's attorney Arnulfo Guerra asked the agent multiple questions, including why the DEA had confused López Falcón's name. Guerra also said there are several people in Matamoros and along the border who call themselves La Muela. The judge was not satisfied with the agent's answers and postponed the hearing for 27 September. She asked the agent to come prepared for the hearing with evidence to present and to bring the lead agent to testify in court if he could.

== Conviction ==
On 3 February 2015, López Falcón pleaded guilty to conspiracy to smuggle cocaine and marijuana into the U.S. before the D.D.C federal judge Barbara Jacobs Rothstein. In his guilty plea, López Falcón admitted he was a member of La Compañía (English: The Company), a name that collectively referred to the co-organization of the Gulf Cartel and its former paramilitary group Los Zetas. He said his criminal organization was responsible for smuggling many tons of cocaine and marijuana from Mexico to the U.S. and that he was directly involved in this process, as well as smuggling the cash proceeds back into Mexico. He also confirmed Los Zetas acted as the paramilitary wing of the Gulf Cartel, and that its members were mostly ex-military members who acted as enforcers and hitmen for the cartel in their region and against rival gangsters.

On 31 July 2015, López Falcón was sentenced to 18 years in prison for conspiracy to smuggle cocaine and marijuana into the U.S. The D.D.C also ordered him to forfeit US$15 billion; the court stated this was the total gross profits the Gulf Cartel made in drug proceeds from its smuggling centers across the U.S.-Mexico border during López Falcón's tenure. A few years after his sentencing, Mexican officials discussed the possibility of passing a law in Mexico permitting them to formally request the U.S. government for fifty percent of the earnings seized from a Mexican national convicted in the US in order to invest that money into their law enforcement agencies. López Falcón was serving his sentence at the Federal Correctional Institution, Ray Brook in Essex County, New York, but was later transferred to the Federal Correctional Institution, Fort Dix in New Jersey. His expected release date was adjusted from September 2029 to August 2029.

The investigation against López Falcón and other co-conspirators was headed by the DEA's field office in Houston and the DEA Bilateral Investigation Unit. It was part of the Organized Crime Drug Enforcement Task Force (OCDETF) program. The prosecution attorney was Adrián Rosales, who was part of the U.S. Department of Justice Criminal Division's Narcotic and Dangerous Drug Section. Assistant Attorney General Leslie R. Caldwell and DEA Administrator Chuck Rosenberg were the first to announce López Falcón's conviction.

== See also ==
- Mexican drug war

== Bibliography ==
- Wyatt, Arthur G.; Torriente, Sean (2012). "Superseding Indictment: United States of America v. Ediel Lopez-Falcon". United States District Court for the District of Columbia.
