= Milazzo (surname) =

Milazzo is a surname. Notable people with the surname include:

- Gaspar Milazzo (1887–1930), Italian-born American mobster
- Ivo Milazzo (born 1947), Italian comic book artist
- Jane Margaret Triche Milazzo (born 1957), American judge
- Richard Milazzo, American art critic, curator, publisher, independent scholar and poet
- Silvio Milazzo (1903–1982), Italian politician
- Vincenzo Milazzo (born 1956), Italian painter
