= Harry Connick =

Harry Connick may refer to:

- Harry Connick Sr. (1926–2024), American district attorney
- Harry Connick Jr. (born 1967), American musician, singer, and actor
