= Brian Benczkowski =

American lawyer (born 1969)

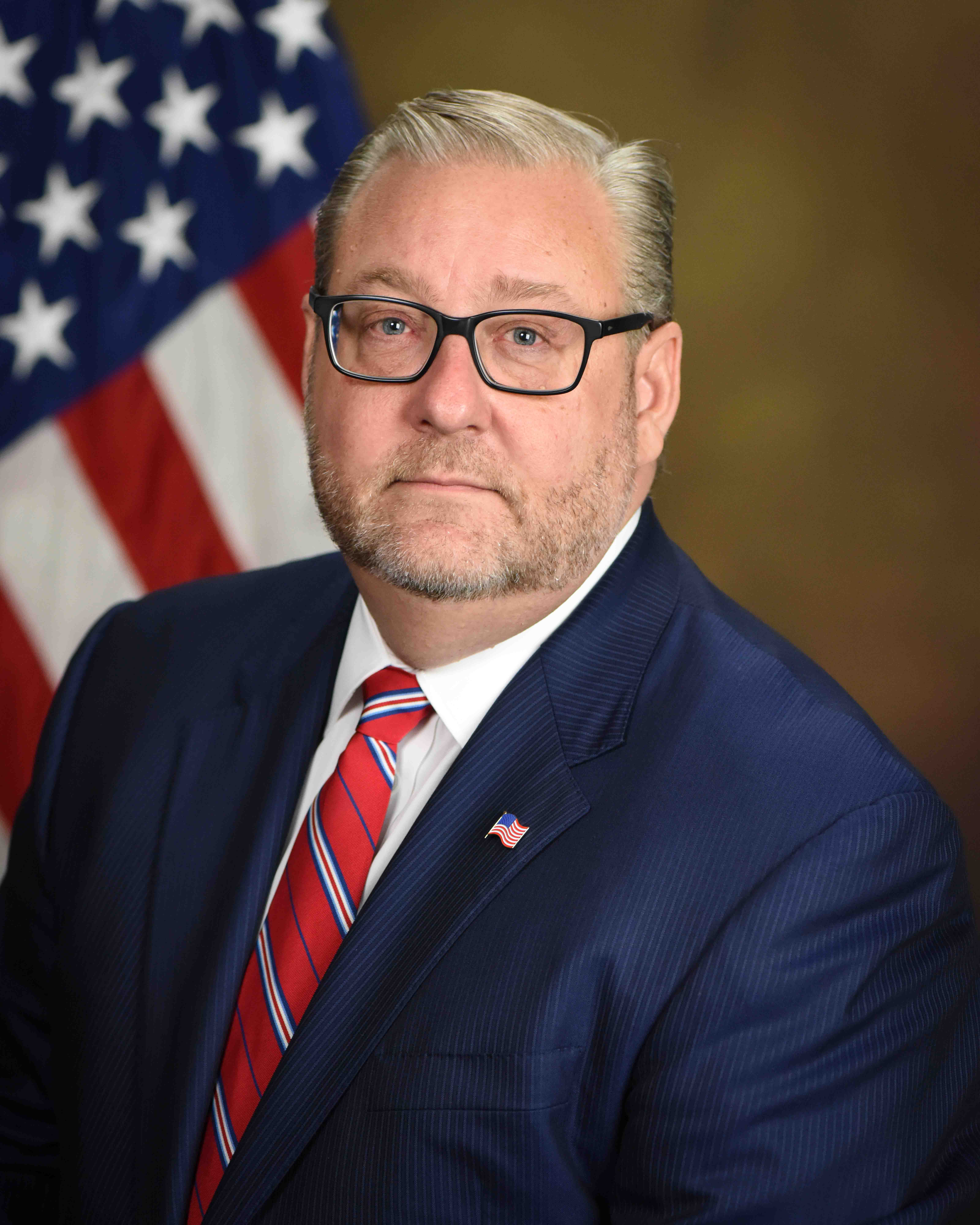

United States Assistant Attorney General for the Criminal Division
- In office July 16, 2018 – July 3, 2020
- President: Donald Trump
- Preceded by: Leslie R. Caldwell
- Succeeded by: Kenneth Polite

Personal details
- Born: Brian Allen Benczkowski; October 5, 1969 (age 56) Fairfax, Virginia, U.S.
- Party: Republican
- Education: University of Virginia (BA); Washington University in St. Louis (JD)

Brian Allen Benczkowski (born October 5, 1969) is an American lawyer who served as the Assistant Attorney General for the Criminal Division of the United States Department of Justice. Prior to assuming that role, he was a partner at Kirkland & Ellis.

== Education ==
Benczkowski received his Bachelor of Arts from the University of Virginia in 1991. He attended the Washington University School of Law, where he was an associate editor of the Washington University Journal of Urban and Contemporary Law. He received his Juris Doctor in 1994.

== Legal career ==
Early in his career, Benczkowski served on the staff of former U.S. Senator Pete Domenici and U.S. Representative Jim Sensenbrenner. His previous roles include serving as Principal Deputy Assistant Attorney General for Legislative Affairs, where he managed the Department of Justice's relationship with Congress. Later, he became Chief of Staff for the Office of the Deputy Attorney General and the Office of the Attorney General. In those positions, he was awarded the Attorney General's Award for Distinguished Service in 2003, and the John Marshall Award for Excellence in Preparing and Handling Legislation in 2008. He was also the Republican Staff Director for the United States Senate Committee on the Judiciary, where he advised Republican members of the committee on legislative, oversight, and nomination issues.

In 2010, Benczkowski joined the law firm of Kirkland & Ellis, where his practice focused on litigation and white collar criminal defense, including government and internal investigations. Benczkowski's clients there included Alfa Bank, the largest private commercial bank in Russia, as well as BP America, Volkswagen, Charter Communications, Blue Cross Blue Shield, and other corporate entities.

== Assistant Attorney General for the Criminal Division ==
Benczkowski was a member of President Donald Trump's 2016 transition team, helping to manage the Justice Department transition.

In June 2017, President Donald Trump announced his intention to nominate Benczkowski to become Assistant Attorney General for the United States Department of Justice Criminal Division. According to The Washington Post, "Benczkowski is a well-regarded lawyer, especially in conservative circles." Politico called him the "GOP's go-to guy for hearings." At the time of his confirmation in July 2018, Benczkowski had no prosecutorial experience.

At his confirmation hearing, Benczkowski refused to recuse himself from dealing with the Mueller investigation, even though he supervised an internal investigation of a bank owned by two Russian oligarchs. He did agree to recuse himself from all matters related to the bank. While in private practice, Benczkowski oversaw an investigation by the cybersecurity firm Stroz Friedberg related to allegations that there was a "secret communications channel" between the Trump Organization and Alfa Bank. During Benczkowski's confirmation hearing he was emphatic that Stroz Friedberg, like Mandiant, had rejected the possibility of complicity, and the investigation's report found that "there was no communications link between the Trump Organization and Alfa Bank." Stroz Friedberg gave the same explanation for why it, along with Mandiant, was "unable to verify" older data in its investigation: it could not inspect the bank's Domain Name System (DNS) logs from 2016 and before because the bank retained such records at the time for only twenty-four hours. The FBI concluded that the data moving between the companies did not amount to clandestine communications.

While heading the Criminal Division, Benczkowski became known for his efforts to use data analytics to combat the opioid epidemic and fraud against government programs enacted to help small businesses during the COVID-19 pandemic, as well as his handling of a whistleblower complaint about President Trump's dealings with Ukraine. He also managed the Fraud, and Money Laundering and Asset Recovery Sections, the largest team of white collar prosecutors in the country. He was responsible for enforcement of the U.S. Foreign Corrupt Practices Act, an antibribery law, and helped negotiate several FCPA settlements against multinational corporations, including the resolution with Ericsson AB that resulted in the telecommunications-equipment maker paying more than $1 billion in fines.

During his tenure, Benczkowski also announced several policy shifts related to how the Department of Justice prosecutes corporations. One policy, which became known as the Benczkowski Memo, set forth the Criminal Division's practices for selecting monitors—third parties who serve in watchdog roles overseeing a company's compliance with the terms of federal criminal settlements. He also was responsible for the division's Evaluation of Corporate Compliance Program Guidance, the Department's Inability to Pay Guidance, revisions to the Foreign Corrupt Practices Act (FCPA) Corporate Enforcement Policy (CEP), and the FCPA Unit's publication of declination letters online. Benczkowski took the view that these policy changes promote greater transparency in how prosecutors apply standards and criteria to cases, which will make investigations more efficient and outcomes fairer and more consistent.

While heading the Criminal Division, Benczkowski and senior career lawyers from the division's Fraud Section met with Rudy Giuliani to discuss a bribery case in which he and other attorneys were representing a Venezuelan energy executive. This meeting took place before the United States Attorney's office in Manhattan, in an unrelated case, publicly charged two Giuliani associates, Lev Parnas and Igor Fruman, with breaking campaign finance laws and trying to unlawfully influence politicians. In an unusual statement, Justice Department spokesman Peter Carr told The New York Times, "When Mr. Benczkowski and fraud section lawyers met with Mr. Giuliani, they were not aware of any investigation of Mr. Giuliani's associates in the Southern District of New York and would not have met with him had they known."

On June 10, 2020, Benczkowski announced he would resign on July 3. On September 1, 2020, Kirkland and Ellis announced that Benczkowski had returned to the firm as a partner in its Washington, D.C. office.

== See also ==
- Timeline of Russian interference in the 2016 United States elections
- Timeline of investigations into Donald Trump and Russia (July–December 2018)
- Trump–Ukraine scandal

Legal offices
Preceded by Leslie R. Caldwell	United States Assistant Attorney General for the Criminal Division; 2018–2020	Succeeded by Brian Rabbitt; Acting
