= Operation Soteria Shield =

2025 American law enforcement operation

Participants
- Planned by: Internet Crimes Against Children Task Force, Federal Bureau of Investigation, and National Center for Missing & Exploited Children
- Executed by: Federal Bureau of Investigation and police agencies

Mission
- Target: Child pornography posters, distributors, and manufacturers
- Method: Arrests

Results
- Suspects: 244
- Arrests: 244

Operation Soteria Shield was a large-scale American law enforcement operation which was conducted in April 2025, resulting in the arrest of 244 suspects and the rescue of 109 children from online sexual exploitation and attacks, and again in April 2026, resulting in the arrest of 276 suspects and the rescue of 89 children. The operation involved over 70 state law enforcement agencies, including the Dallas, Plano, Rowlett, Rockwall, Wylie, and Garland police departments, as well as the Federal Bureau of Investigation Dallas Division, North Texas Internet Crimes Against Children Task Force, and the National Center for Missing & Exploited Children, whose analysts provided intelligence and case coordination. The effort was aimed at identifying and prosecuting individuals involved in the production, distribution, and possession of child sexual abuse material. Over 368 total charges were filed.

== Operation ==
The operation was described as a "massive team effort" and highlighted the importance of interagency collaboration in protecting children and holding offenders accountable. In April 2025, authorities arrested 244 suspects and, in addition to the arrests, investigators seized 1,130 digital devices and 213 terabytes of data containing illicit material. The FBI and law enforcement partners stated that the operation was necessary to combat this "insidious crime" and to ensure that those who exploit children are held accountable. According to Plano Police Department Assistant Chief, Dan Curtis, many of the children recognized or rescued were previously unidentified and they'd never been reported missing with their abuse known to authorities.

The U.S. Attorney’s Office for the Eastern District of Texas also participated in the operation, which led to the indictment of individuals for distributing child pornography and sexually exploiting children to produce child sexual abuse material.
