= Jim Letten =

American lawyer

James B. Letten
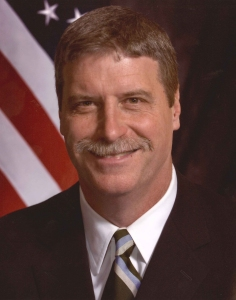

United States Attorney for the Eastern District of Louisiana
- In office April 30, 2001 – December 11, 2012
- President: George W. Bush; Barack Obama
- Preceded by: Eddie J. Jordan Jr.
- Succeeded by: Kenneth Polite

Personal details
- Born: September 12, 1953 (age 73) New Orleans, Louisiana, U.S.
- Education: University of New Orleans (BA); Tulane University (JD)

James B. Letten (born September 12, 1953) is an American attorney. A career prosecutor, Letten served as U.S. Attorney for the Eastern District of Louisiana for more than eleven years. By the time Letten resigned as U.S. Attorney in December 2012, he was the longest-serving U.S. Attorney in the country.

After stepping down, Letten joined Tulane University Law School as an assistant dean. Letten later became of counsel with the firm of Butler Snow, while retaining his post at Tulane.

== Early life and education ==
Letten was born at Southern Baptist Hospital in New Orleans on September 12, 1953. He is the only son of Alden and Dorothy "Dot" Letten; his father was a steel fabricator.

Letten graduated from De La Salle High School in 1971. He received his B.A. from the University of New Orleans in 1976 and his Juris Doctor from the Tulane University Law School in 1979.

== Career ==
Letten worked for Orleans Parish District Attorney Harry Connick Sr. for four years. In 1982, Letten became a federal prosecutor, beginning on an organized crime strike force. He was part of the team that prosecuted several leaders of the New Orleans mafia and figures from the New York crime families.

From 1994 to 2001, Letten was first assistant U.S. attorney under then-U.S. Attorney Eddie Jordan Jr. (who later became Orleans Parish district attorney). In that position Letten was best known as the lead prosecutor in the racketeering trial of former Louisiana Governor Edwin Edwards. Letten also prosecuted former state representative David Duke.

=== U.S. Attorney ===
Letten is a Republican, having been appointed to the U.S. Attorney's position by President George W. Bush. Nonetheless, when Republicans lost the Presidency to Democrat Barack Obama in 2008, many Democrats, including U.S. Senator Mary Landrieu, took the unusual step of urging the new President to reappoint Letten.

As U.S. Attorney, Letten became known for his "successful prosecutions of public officials," ranging from corrupt elected officials to corrupt judges, police officers, and school officials. The New York Times described him as "a popular crusader against the crooked traditions of Louisiana public servants."

The Times-Picayune listed the following as the notable public corruption cases in which the U.S. Attorney's Office achieved convictions under Letten's leadership: "ex-Jefferson Parish Judges Ronald Bodenheimer and Alan Green; former Orleans Parish School Board President Ellenese Brooks-Simms; ex-state Sen. Derrick Shepherd; former St. Tammany Parish Councilman Joe Impastato; a whole bunch of folks who worked for or did business with the Orleans Parish School Board; several high-profile associates of ex-Mayor Marc Morial; and ex-New Orleans City Councilman Oliver Thomas, who had been pegged as a front-runner in the 2010 mayor's race." These successes gained Letten bipartisan support, including from both Louisiana's U.S. Senators, Democrat Mary Landrieu and Republican David Vitter.

In September 2009, the Times-Picayune praised Letten and the FBI for "bringing to justice" Bill Hubbard, who resigned as Saint John Parish president after receiving bribes of $20,000 from contractors.

After being retained in office by President Obama, Letten pursued a number of federal civil rights investigations into the New Orleans Police Department, a priority of the Obama administration's Department of Justice.

In 2010, the conservative provocateur videographer/prankster James O'Keefe, "who specialized in often deceptively edited undercover camera work to expose what he considers to liberal hypocrisies," pleaded guilty to federal misdemeanor charges of entering the New Orleans offices of Senator Landrieu disguised as a telephone repairman and attempting to tamper with the office's phone system under false pretenses. fellow activists who accompanied O'Keefe also faced prosecution. Although the U.S. Attorney's Office prosecuted the case, Letten recused himself because he knew the father of one of the men involved. In July 2013, after Letten left the U.S. Attorney's office to become assistant dean at Tulane law school, O'Keefe appeared at Letten's home, where he complained to Letten's wife about his prosecution, and later confronted Letten on the Tulane campus in a tense videotaped exchange. Letten called O'Keefe "scum" and told him to "stay away from my family."

In December 2012, Letten resigned as U.S. Attorney, following revelations that senior prosecutors in Letten's office had made "provocative, even pugnacious comments about active criminal matters and other subjects under aliases at nola.com, the Web site of The Times-Picayune newspaper." Senator Mary Landrieu and Attorney General Eric Holder paid tribute to Letten's service.

=== Later career ===
In February 2013, Letten was appointed assistant dean of experiential learning at Tulane University Law School, his alma mater. Letten is in charge of the school's moot-court competition and six legal clinics.

In November 2015, Letten joined the New Orleans office of the law firm Butler Snow LLP as of counsel. Letten works with the firm's investigations and white-collar crimes group. He continues to simultaneously serve as Tulane assistant dean.

=== Naval service ===
Letten served in the United States Naval Reserve for two decades and retired as a commander. Letten was a naval intelligence officer, with roles including (among others) counter-intelligence and intelligence analysis. He spent more than twelve years as a Naval Criminal Investigative Service (NCIS) agent.

== Personal life ==
Letten has been married to JoAnn Letten for over thirty years; they have two children.

Letten has been noted for his "trademark" bushy mustache.
