= Peter G. Strasser =

American attorney

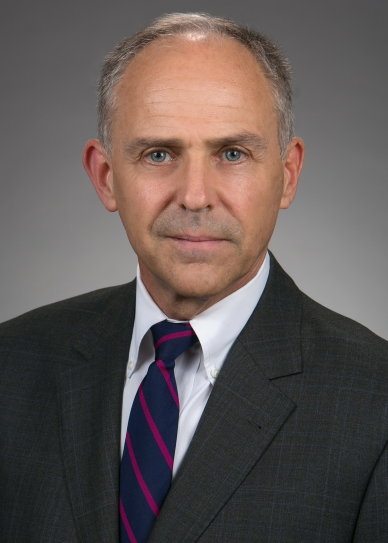

United States Attorney for the Eastern District of Louisiana
- In office September 10, 2018 – February 28, 2021
- President: Donald Trump; Joe Biden
- Preceded by: Kenneth Allen Polite Jr.
- Succeeded by: Duane A. Evans (acting)

Personal details
- Education: University of Virginia, (BA); Washington & Lee University (JD)

Military service
- Allegiance: United States
- Branch/service: United States Navy
- Rank: Captain
- Unit: Judge Advocate General's Corps

Peter G. Strasser is an American attorney who served as the United States Attorney for the Eastern District of Louisiana from 2018 to 2021. Prior to becoming the U.S. Attorney, he was a partner at the New Orleans office of Chaffe McCalle.

== Biography ==
Strasser earned his Bachelor of Arts, with distinction, from the University of Virginia. He earned his Juris Doctor from Washington and Lee University School of Law.

Strasser previously served as an Assistant United States Attorney for the Eastern District of Louisiana, where he was the head of the organized crime and the economic crime sections. He also served for over eleven years at United States Embassies in Eastern Europe, Asia, and Africa as a Resident Legal Advisor with the Department of Justice's Office of Overseas Prosecutorial Development, Assistance, and Training.

He is a retired Navy Reserve Captain, JAGC, where he served world-wide as a military judge.

== U.S. Attorney ==
On June 20, 2018, President Donald Trump announced his intent to nominate Strasser to be the next United States Attorney for the Eastern District of Louisiana. On June 25, 2018, his nomination was sent to the United States Senate. On August 23, 2018, his nomination was reported out of committee by a voice vote. On August 28, 2018, the United States Senate confirmed his nomination by voice vote. Strasser was sworn into office on September 10, 2018.

On February 8, 2021, he along with 55 other Trump-era attorneys were asked to resign. On February 23, 2021, Strasser submitted his resignation, effective February 28, 2021.
