= Peter Beer (judge) =

American judge

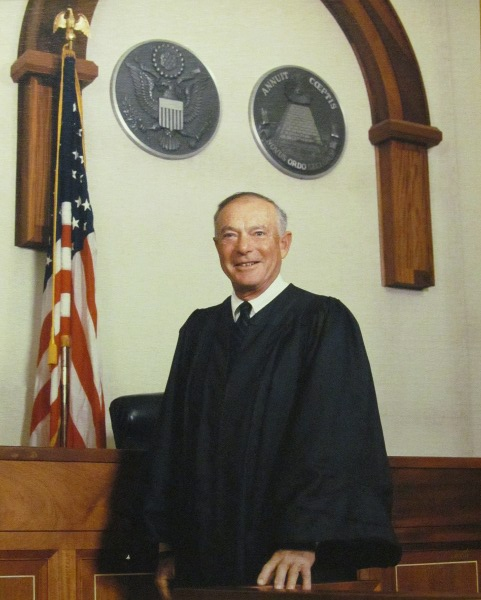

Senior Judge of the United States District Court for the Eastern District of Louisiana
- In office April 12, 1994 – February 9, 2018

Judge of the United States District Court for the Eastern District of Louisiana
- In office November 27, 1979 – April 12, 1994
- Appointed by: Jimmy Carter
- Preceded by: Seat established by 92 Stat. 1629
- Succeeded by: Mary Ann Vial Lemmon

Personal details
- Born: Peter Hill Beer; April 12, 1928 New Orleans, Louisiana, U.S.
- Died: February 9, 2018 (aged 89) New Orleans, Louisiana, U.S.
- Education: Tulane University (BBA, LLB)

Peter Hill Beer (April 12, 1928 – February 9, 2018) was a United States district judge of the United States District Court for the Eastern District of Louisiana.

== Education and career ==
Born in New Orleans, Louisiana, Beer was a sergeant in the United States Army toward the end of World War II, from 1945 to 1946. He received a Bachelor of Business Administration from Tulane University in 1949 and a Bachelor of Laws from Tulane Law School in 1952. He was a captain in the United States Air Force JAG Corps from 1952 to 1955. He was in private practice in New Orleans from 1955 to 1974, serving on the New Orleans City Council from 1969 to 1974, including service as vice president from 1972 to 1974, and as acting president from 1973 to 1974. He was a judge of the Louisiana Court of Appeals from 1974 to 1979, and of the Louisiana Supreme Court from 1978 to 1979.

== Federal judicial service ==
On October 11, 1979, Beer was nominated by President Jimmy Carter to a new seat on the United States District Court for the Eastern District of Louisiana created by 92 Stat. 1629. He was confirmed by the United States Senate on November 26, 1979, and received his commission on November 27, 1979. He assumed senior status on April 12, 1994. He took inactive senior status on December 7, 2009, serving in that status until his death.

== Death ==
Beer died on February 9, 2018, at his New Orleans home.

== See also ==
- List of Jewish American jurists

== Sources ==
- Political Graveyard

Legal offices
Preceded by Seat established by 92 Stat. 1629	Judge of the United States District Court for the Eastern District of Louisiana; 1979–1994	Succeeded by Mary Ann Vial Lemmon
