= Dino Cinel =

Italian American historian (1941–2018)

Dino Cinel (1941–2018) was an Italian-American historian, priest and a Distinguished Professor of Italian-American Studies at College of Staten Island. He is known for evading prosecution and conviction of his self-made child sexual abuse material that he filmed and created at St. Rita's Parish in New Orleans while living there due to his ties to Harry Connick Sr., who was a St. Rita's parishioner at the time.

== Life ==
In 1988, he was a Roman Catholic priest at St. Rita's Church, New Orleans. He was investigated over his possession of child sexual abuse materials, which he had created of himself abusing boys in the rectory of St. Rita's, where he was living at the time. The following lack of prosecution created public outrage and he was not charged by the New Orleans District Attorney until 1995. He was acquitted by the jury because child pornography laws had not yet been enacted at the time he filmed himself abusing the boys. He sued over the public release of the information and it wasn't until 2010 that the Vatican formally revoked his priesthood.

He taught at Tulane University. The scholarship of his book, From Italy to San Francisco, has been questioned. After his abuse in New Orleans came to light, he fled to Italy and later took a position at the College of Staten Island of the City University of New York. Upon learning of his eventual charges, he was suspended with pay from the university. He and his wife, fellow Tulane professor Linda Pollock, divorced in 2015 after many years of separation.

Cinel was stabbed to death in Medellin, Colombia in February 2018 by an 18-year-old man with whom he had been in a relationship.

== Awards ==
- 1984 Merle Curti Award in Social History

== Works ==
- From Italy to San Francisco. Stanford University Press. 1982. ISBN 978-0-8047-1117-3.
- The National Integration of Italian Return Migration, 1870-1929. Cambridge University Press. 2002. ISBN 978-0-521-52118-5.
