= Mary Ann Vial Lemmon =

American judge (born 1941)

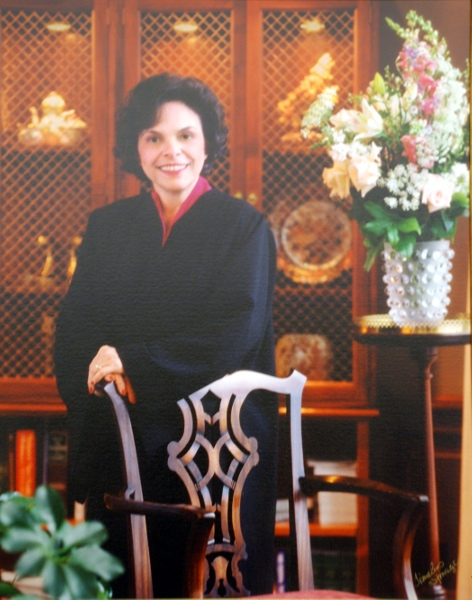

Senior Judge of the United States District Court for the Eastern District of Louisiana
- Incumbent
- Assumed office January 1, 2011

Judge of the United States District Court for the Eastern District of Louisiana
- In office July 25, 1996 – January 1, 2011
- Appointed by: Bill Clinton
- Preceded by: Peter Beer
- Succeeded by: Jane Triche Milazzo

Personal details
- Born: Mary Ann Vial; 1941 (age 84–85) New Orleans, Louisiana, U.S.
- Education: Loyola University New Orleans (BA, JD)

Mary Ann Vial Lemmon (born 1941) is a senior United States district judge of the United States District Court for the Eastern District of Louisiana.

== Education and career ==
Born in New Orleans, Louisiana, Lemmon attended Loyola University New Orleans and continued as a law student on that campus, to receive a Juris Doctor from Loyola University New Orleans School of Law in 1964. Lemmon was in private practice in Hahnville, Louisiana, from 1964 to 1975. She was a law clerk for her husband Judge Harry T. Lemmon, on the Court of Appeal, Fourth Circuit of Louisiana, from 1975 to 1980, and she continued with him as his law clerk on his elevation to the Supreme Court of Louisiana from 1980 to 1981.

== Judicial service ==
Lemmon was a Judge pro tempore of Louisiana District Court for Louisiana's Twenty-third Judicial District from 1981 to 1982. She was a judge on the Louisiana District Court for Louisiana's Twenty-ninth Judicial District from 1982 to 1996. She was a Judge pro tempore, Court of Appeal, First Circuit, Louisiana, in 1990. Lemmon was a federal judge on the United States District Court for the Eastern District of Louisiana. Lemmon was nominated by President Bill Clinton on December 19, 1995, to a seat vacated by Peter Beer. She was confirmed by the United States Senate on July 10, 1996, and received her commission on July 25, 1996. She assumed senior status on January 1, 2011.

== Notable case ==
In June 2009, Lemmon was in the news as the jurist who denied a request by Mose Jefferson to delay his trial on bribery charges also involving former Louisiana legislator Renée Gill Pratt and former Orleans Parish School Board president Ellenese Brooks-Simms.

== Personal life ==
Lemmon married Harry T. Lemmon, a New Orleans attorney who would later become an Associate Justice of the Louisiana Supreme Court, with whom Lemmon had six children. She remained married to her husband until his death in April 2025.

== Sources ==
Legal offices
Preceded by Peter Beer	Judge of the United States District Court for the Eastern District of Louisiana; 1996–2011	Succeeded by Jane Triche Milazzo
