= Kenneth Polite =

American attorney (born 1976)

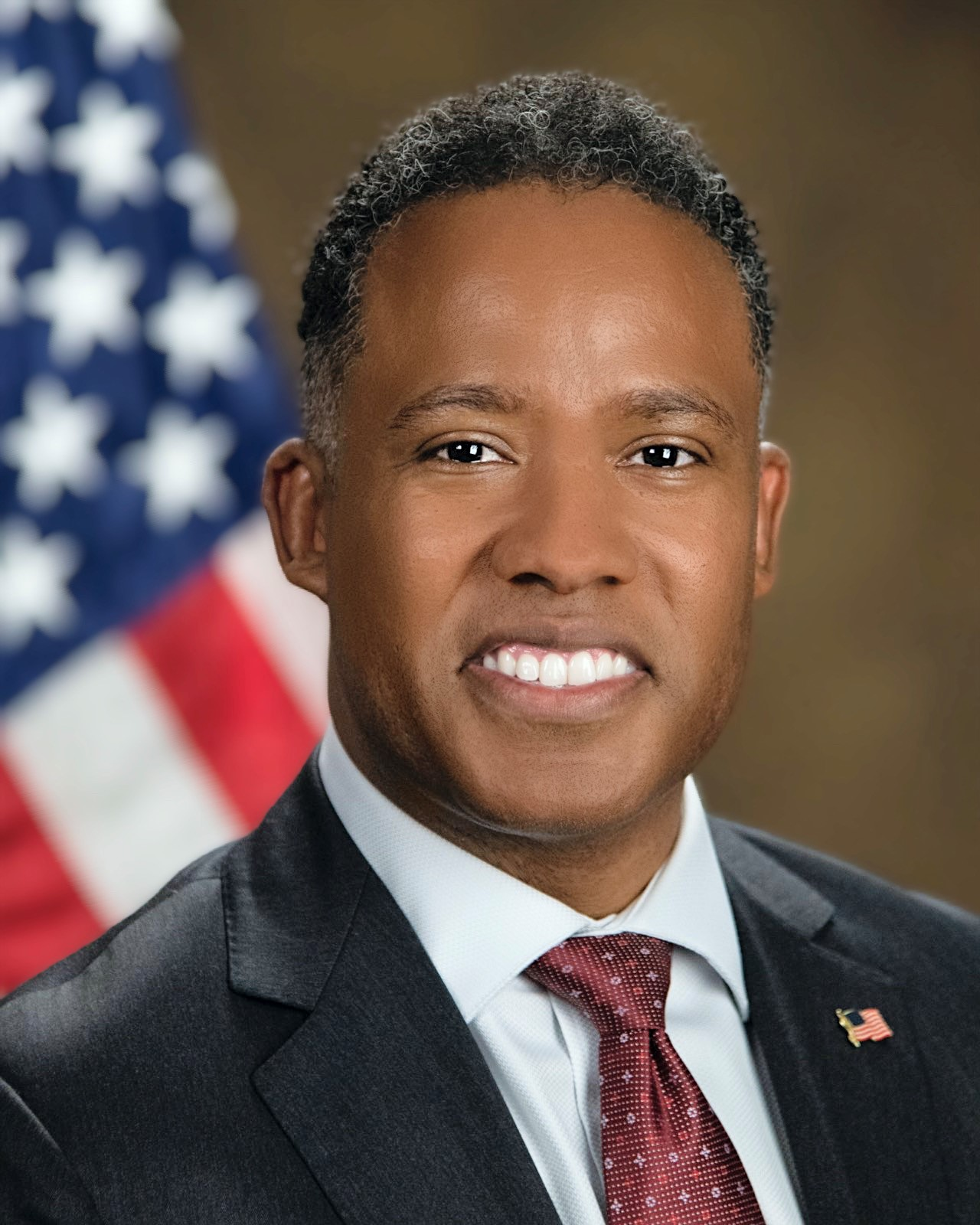

United States Assistant Attorney General for the Criminal Division
- In office July 21, 2021 – July 28, 2023
- President: Joe Biden
- Preceded by: Brian Benczkowski
- Succeeded by: Andrew Duva

United States Attorney for the Eastern District of Louisiana
- In office September 20, 2013 – March 10, 2017
- President: Barack Obama; Donald Trump
- Preceded by: Jim Letten
- Succeeded by: Peter G. Strasser

Personal details
- Born: Kenneth Allen Polite Jr. 1976 (age 49–50) New Orleans, Louisiana, U.S.
- Spouse: Florencia Greer
- Children: 2
- Education: Harvard University (BA); Georgetown University (JD)

Kenneth Allen Polite Jr. (born 1976) is an American lawyer who previously served as the assistant attorney general for the criminal division in the United States Department of Justice from 2021 to 2023. He also served as a United States attorney for the Eastern District of Louisiana from 2013 to 2017.

== Early life and education ==
Polite was born in 1976 in New Orleans, Louisiana to teenage parents. His mother, Rosalind, was still in high school when he was born and his father Kenneth Polite Sr., eventually became a police officer. Along with brothers, Damion and Tyrrel, Polite was raised by his single mother in the Lower Ninth Ward. In 1993, he graduated as valedictorian from De La Salle High School in New Orleans. He received a Bachelor of Arts degree from Harvard University in 1997 and a Juris Doctor from the Georgetown University Law Center in 2000.

== Career ==
In 2001, Polite served as a law clerk to Judge Thomas L. Ambro of the United States Court of Appeals for the Third Circuit. From 2002 to 2006, he served as an associate at the law firm of Skadden, Arps, Slate, Meagher & Flom LLP in New York City. He served as an assistant United States attorney in the Southern District of New York, from 2007 to 2010. From 2010 to 2013, he was a shareholder at the law firm of Liskow & Lewis in New Orleans, Louisiana, where he headed the firm's White Collar Crime Defense Group and served as the hiring partner.

=== United States Attorney ===
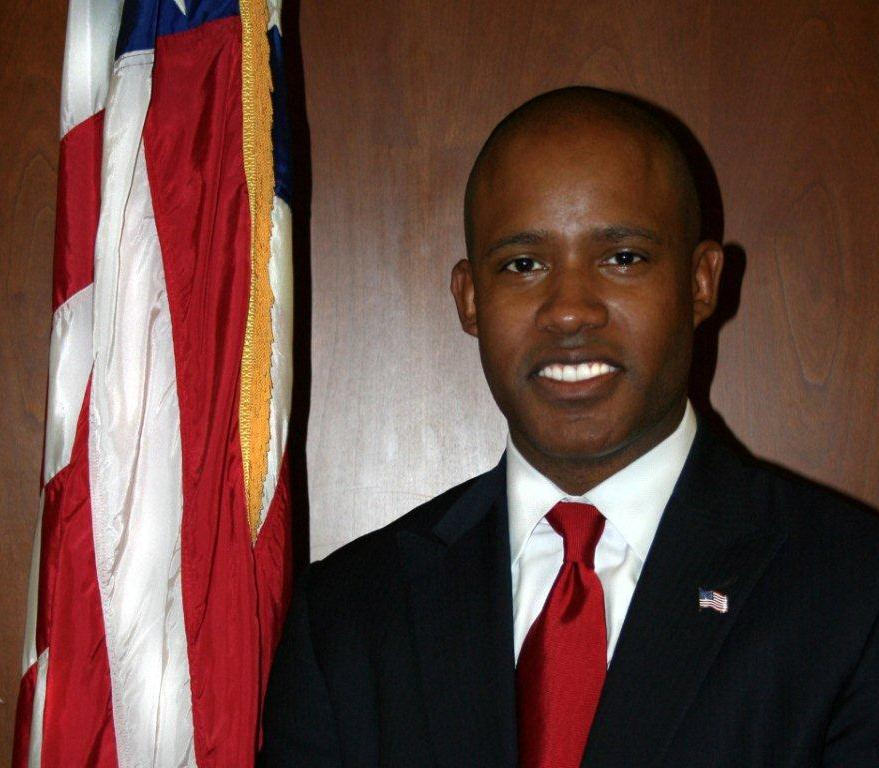
Polite as United States Attorney (2013–2017)

On June 27, 2013, President Barack Obama nominated Polite to be the United States Attorney for the Eastern District of Louisiana. His nomination was reported by the Senate Judiciary Committee on September 12, 2013, by voice vote. On September 17, 2013, his nomination was confirmed in the Senate by voice vote. He received his commission on September 20, 2013, and took the oath of office the same day. In 2014, Polite created the Crescent City Keepers Mentoring Program, aimed at using faith communities to mentor at-risk youth. He also created an anti corruption unit to address claims of civil rights violations and public corruption. That same year, Polite introduced the 30-2-2 reentry program for former inmates. The program joined with 30 local businesses who agreed to hire two formerly incarcerated individuals for two years.

In 2015, Polite was named to the Advisory Committee of U.S. Attorneys, a national advisory board for the U.S. Attorney General Loretta Lynch. The advisory board provides advice and counsel to the Attorney General and other Justice Department officials on issues related to policy and operations.

Under Polite, the U.S. attorney's office has brought several high-profile cases against individuals such as Robert Durst, Ray Nagin, Big Freedia and Darren Sharper.

=== 2017 dismissal ===
In 2017, under President Donald Trump, U.S. Attorney General Jeff Sessions compelled the resignation of 46 U.S. Attorneys across the country, including Polite. He submitted his resignation thereafter and stepped down on March 24. From 2018 to 2021, Polite was a partner at the law firm of Morgan, Lewis & Bockius.

=== Assistant Attorney General, Criminal Division ===
On April 12, 2021, President Joe Biden nominated Polite to be an Assistant Attorney General for the Criminal Division within the United States Department of Justice. On May 26, 2021, a hearing on his nomination was held before the Senate Judiciary Committee. On June 17, 2021, the committee favorably reported his nomination to the Senate floor. On July 20, 2021, the Senate confirmed Polite by a vote of 56–44. He was sworn in on July 21, 2021. Polite left the Justice Department at the end of July 2023. Later that year, he joined Sidley Austin as a partner and global co-leader of the firm's white-collar practice.

== Personal life ==
Polite is married to Florencia Greer Polite, Chief, Division of General Obstetrics & Gynecology, at the University of Pennsylvania. The couple met while attending Harvard. The couple and their two daughters live in Philadelphia and are Catholic.

He has served on the Louisiana Civil Service Commission and the board of New Orleans College Prep Charter School in Central City. Polite cites the murder of his half-brother in New Orleans in 2004 as a factor in becoming a prosecutor.

Polite is a member of the Kappa Alpha Psi fraternity. In 2015, Polite received an honorary doctorate from Loyola University.

== See also ==
- 2017 dismissal of U.S. attorneys

Legal offices
Preceded by Nicholas McQuaid; Acting	United States Assistant Attorney General for the Criminal Division; 2021–2023	Succeeded by Andrew Duva; Acting
