= Operation Protect Our Children =

US anti child-pornography operation

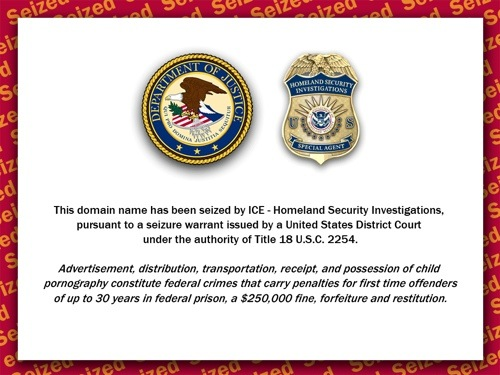
The seizure notice visible on Mooo.com's 84,000 subdomains

Operation Protect Our Children (also called Operation Save Our Children) was a 2011 joint operation by U.S. Immigration and Customs Enforcement, and the U.S. Department of Justice's Child Exploitation and Obscenity Section and Asset Forfeiture and Money Laundering Section to execute "seizure warrants against 10 domain names of websites engaged in the advertisement and distribution of child pornography". The enforcement action was spearheaded by ICE's Cyber Crimes Center (C3).

One of the domains seized, mooo.com, belonged to the DNS provider FreeDNS. FreeDNS stated that on "February 11th at around 9:30 PM PST mooo.com (the most popular shared domain at afraid.org) was suspended at the registrar level." All 84,000 of mooo.com's subdomains were subsequently redirected to a warning which stated:

This domain name has been seized by ICE – Homeland Security Investigations pursuant to a seizure warrant issued by a United States District Court under the authority of Title 18 U.S.C. 2254.
Advertisement, distribution, transportation, receipt, and possession of child pornography constitute federal crimes that carry penalties for first time offenders of up to 30 years in federal prison, a $250,000 fine, forfeiture and restitution.

Service to mooo.com was restored on February 13, 2011, at around 7:15 p.m, although FreeDNS admins noted that it would take up to 3 days for domain propagation. This meant that the affected sites would be unusable and would continue to display the child pornography accusation.

It was initially unclear whether the entire mooo.com domain was shut down due to clerical error or intentionally, ICE later apologized for the seizure stating, "During the course of a joint DHS and DOJ law enforcement operation targeting 10 websites providing explicit child pornographic content, a higher level domain name and linked sites were inadvertently seized for a period of time." The excessive seizure has led to criticism of the DOJ's ex parte warrant process and its possible abuse.

== See also ==
- Think of the children
- Censorship

== Notes ==
This article incorporates public domain material from John Q. Public. Joint DHS-DOJ "Operation Protect Our Children" Seizes Website Domains Involved in Advertising and Distributing Child Pornography. United States Department of Homeland Security.
