= Computer Crime and Intellectual Property Section =

United States federal law enforcement agency

Seal of the Department of Justice

The Computer Crime and Intellectual Property Section (CCIPS) is a section of the Criminal Division of the U.S. Department of Justice in charge of investigating computer crime (hacking, viruses, worms) and intellectual property crime. They are additionally responsible for prosecuting privacy invasions by criminals such as hackers, cyberstalkers, and purveyors of mobile spyware, and specializing in the search and seizure of digital evidence in computers and on networks. In July 2023 the Justice Department announced that it was merging its National Cryptocurrency Enforcement Team (NCET) into CCIPS.

CCIPS has been responsible for:

- the prosecution of infamous hackers such as Albert Gonzalez, who led a hacking ring that stole over 40 million debit and credit card numbers by infiltrating major payment processor and retail networks across the country,
- the multi-nation effort that disrupted the "Gameover ZeuS" Botnet and "CryptoLocker" Ransomware scheme that was connected to the indictment of the alleged Russian cybercriminal Evgeniy Bogachev,
- obtaining a conviction that was handed down by a New Jersey jury in the case of Christopher Rad, who organized an international securities fraud ring and stock manipulation through Botnets and was sentenced to 71 months in prison,
- the indictment of Kim Dotcom, who operated Megaupload.com, a website that enabled large scale online copyright infringement and digital piracy,
- and working with various U.S. Attorney's Offices across the nation as well as a number of international partners to prosecute "Darknet market" websites hosted by the Tor network.
