= Barry Ashe =

American judge (born 1956)

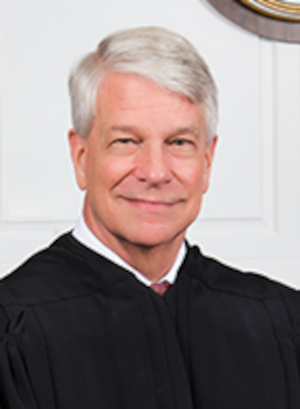

Judge of the United States District Court for the Eastern District of Louisiana
- Incumbent
- Assumed office August 30, 2018
- Appointed by: Donald Trump
- Preceded by: Ivan L. R. Lemelle

Personal details
- Born: Barry Weldon Ashe; 1956 (age 69–70) New Orleans, Louisiana, U.S.
- Education: Tulane University (BA, JD)

Military service
- Allegiance: United States
- Branch/service: United States Navy
- Years of service: 1978–1981
- Rank: Lieutenant

Barry Weldon Ashe (born 1956) is a United States district judge of the United States District Court for the Eastern District of Louisiana.

== Biography ==
Ashe earned his Bachelor of Arts from Tulane University, summa cum laude, where he was inducted into Phi Beta Kappa and Omicron Delta Kappa, and his Juris Doctor from Tulane University Law School, where he graduated magna cum laude, was inducted into the Order of the Coif, and served as the senior managing editor of the Tulane Law Review.

Upon graduation from law school, he served as a law clerk to Judge Carolyn Dineen King of the United States Court of Appeals for the Fifth Circuit. Prior to enrolling in law school, he served for three years in the United States Navy, where he rose to the rank of lieutenant and received an honorable discharge.

Before becoming a judge, he was a partner in the New Orleans office of Stone Pigman Walther Wittmann L.L.C., where his practice spanned a broad range of complex civil and commercial law matters, in both state and federal courts, at trial and on appeal.

== Federal judicial service ==
On September 28, 2017, President Donald Trump announced his intent to nominate Ashe to an undetermined seat on the United States District Court for the Eastern District of Louisiana. On October 2, 2017, he was officially nominated to the seat vacated by Judge Ivan L. R. Lemelle, who assumed senior status on June 29, 2015.

On January 3, 2018, his nomination was returned to the President under Rule XXXI, Paragraph 6 of the United States Senate. On January 5, 2018, President Donald Trump announced his intent to renominate Ashe to a federal judgeship. On January 8, 2018, his renomination was sent to the Senate. A hearing on his nomination before the Senate Judiciary Committee was held on January 10, 2018. On February 8, 2018, the Senate Judiciary Committee reported Ashe's nomination out of committee by a 20–1 vote. On August 28, 2018, his nomination was confirmed by a voice vote. He received his judicial commission on August 30, 2018.

== Memberships ==
He has been a member of the New Orleans chapter of the Federalist Society since 2006.

Legal offices
| Preceded by Ivan L. R. Lemelle | Judge of the United States District Court for the Eastern District of Louisiana; 2018–present | Incumbent |
