= National Child Victim Identification Program =

U.S. government law enforcement database

The National Child Victim Identification Program (NCVIP) is the world's largest database of child pornography, maintained by the Child Exploitation and Obscenity Section (CEOS) of the United States Department of Justice and the National Center for Missing and Exploited Children (NCMEC) for the purpose of identifying victims of child abuse.

== History and operations ==
The program was created by Andrew Oosterban, head of the Child Exploitation and Obscenity Section. Development of the database began in 1999, and it was launched in 2003. It contains images contributed by US Immigration and Customs Enforcement (ICE), FBI, Secret Service, Postal Inspection Service, and several other organizations. In March 2005, the Justice Department's database was merged with that of the NCMEC.

The database uses image analysis software developed by LTU Technologies to detect victims. As a security measure, police are not allowed to personally browse the database, and they cannot identify victims by name. Instead, they are given contact information for higher-level officers who have security clearance. When child pornography is seized, specialist FBI investigators analyze the entire collection before running the images through the database, as the way the computer files are organized can help in identifying victims. Following a seizure of more than 10,000 images in California in 2007, two officers from the Washington Field Office of the FBI reviewed every image.

In early 2006, United States Attorney General Alberto Gonzales used images from the NCVIP database to view child pornography, as part of a campaign for his Project Safe Childhood initiative. According to a speech he gave at the NCMEC, Gonzales saw images of "older men forcing naked young girls to have anal sex", "a young toddler, tied up with towels, desperately crying in pain while she is being brutally raped and sodomized by an adult man", and "a mere infant being savagely penetrated". He described the experience as "shocking".
