= Eddie Jordan (attorney) =

American lawyer

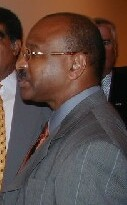
- Jordan in 2003

United States Attorney for the Eastern District of Louisiana
- In office 1994–2001
- President: Bill Clinton
- Preceded by: Robert J. Boitmann
- Succeeded by: Jim Letten

District Attorney of Orleans Parish
- In office 2003–2007
- Preceded by: Harry Connick Sr.
- Succeeded by: Keva Landrum-Johnson (Acting)
- Constituency: New Orleans, Louisiana

Personal details
- Born: October 6, 1952 (age 74)
- Education: Wesleyan University (BA); Rutgers University (JD)

Eddie Jack Jordan Jr. (born October 6, 1952) is an American attorney who served as the district attorney for Orleans Parish, Louisiana from 2003 until his resignation in 2007. A member of the Democratic Party, Jordan was the first African American to have held the elected position. He announced his resignation on October 30, 2007, when a court rendered a large judgment against his office on behalf of white employees that the D.A. had earlier dismissed on account of their race.

== Life and career ==
Jordan was born to Mr. and Mrs. Eddie J. Jordan Sr. He grew up in the middle class Pontchartrain Park neighborhood of the Ninth Ward of New Orleans. He graduated from Wesleyan University in Middletown, Connecticut in 1974, and was then awarded a scholarship to the Rutgers University School of Law in New Jersey, from which he graduated in 1977. After being admitted to the bar and practicing in Pennsylvania for some four years, Jordan returned to Louisiana in 1981 to teach law at Southern University in Baton Rouge. He became a member of the Louisiana bar the following year.

In 1984 Jordan returned to New Orleans to serve as assistant U.S. attorney under then-U.S. Attorney John Volz, a Republican appointed by U.S. President Ronald W. Reagan.

In 1994, Jordan he was named United States Attorney for the Eastern District of Louisiana by his fellow Democrat, President Bill Clinton. As U.S. Attorney, he supervised the prosecution of Governor Edwin Washington Edwards which resulted in the imprisonment of Edwards and several conspirators. Jordan has been criticized for not also having indicted former U.S. Representative Cleo Fields as an Edwards conspirator despite Federal Bureau of Investigation video showing Fields stuffing $20,000 into his pockets. Jordan became a well-known figure on television with his trademark moustache and derby hat.

In 2001, Jordan retired as U.S. attorney to enter private practice.

On November 5, 2002, Jordan was elected district attorney to succeed the retiring Harry Connick Sr. (father of singer Harry Connick Jr.). Jordan defeated fellow Democrat Dale Atkins, 62,155 votes (52 percent) to 57,977 (48 percent). In the October 5 primary, six Democrats and one Republican had filed for the office. The combined Democratic candidates polled 98 percent of the primary vote in the historically Democratic city and parish. Jordan took office in 2003.

A jury determined that Jordan violated employment discrimination laws when, after having taken office, he ordered the wholesale firing of white employees and replaced almost all of them with black workers.

New Orleans, which since Hurricane Katrina has balanced its budget by securing federal loans, will have to determine a way to pay Jordan's legal tab or risk watching the prosecutors' office shut down for financial reasons. Mayor C. Ray Nagin said that the city cannot pay the judgment rendered to the former white employees.

On March 30, 2005, Jordan was found liable for racial discrimination by a federal jury for the mass firing of forty-three white employees immediately after he took office. These employees were replaced almost entirely by African Americans. As a result of Jordan being found liable while acting in his "capacity as a public official", the Orleans Parish District Attorney's Office was required to pay $2.4 million to the plaintiffs. Jordan lost an appeal of the case.

On December 28, 2006, a grand jury indicted seven New Orleans Police Department officers on first-degree murder charges for the death of two men on the Danzinger Bridge in the turmoil after Hurricane Katrina (see NOPD for more information). While he was celebrated for his supervision of the Edwards trial, Jordan has not garnered similar praise for his performance as district attorney. Under Jordan's reign, the murder and attempted murder conviction rate was only 12 percent in 2003 and 2004, compared to the 80 percent national average. His office also had an overall prosecution rate of only 7 percent

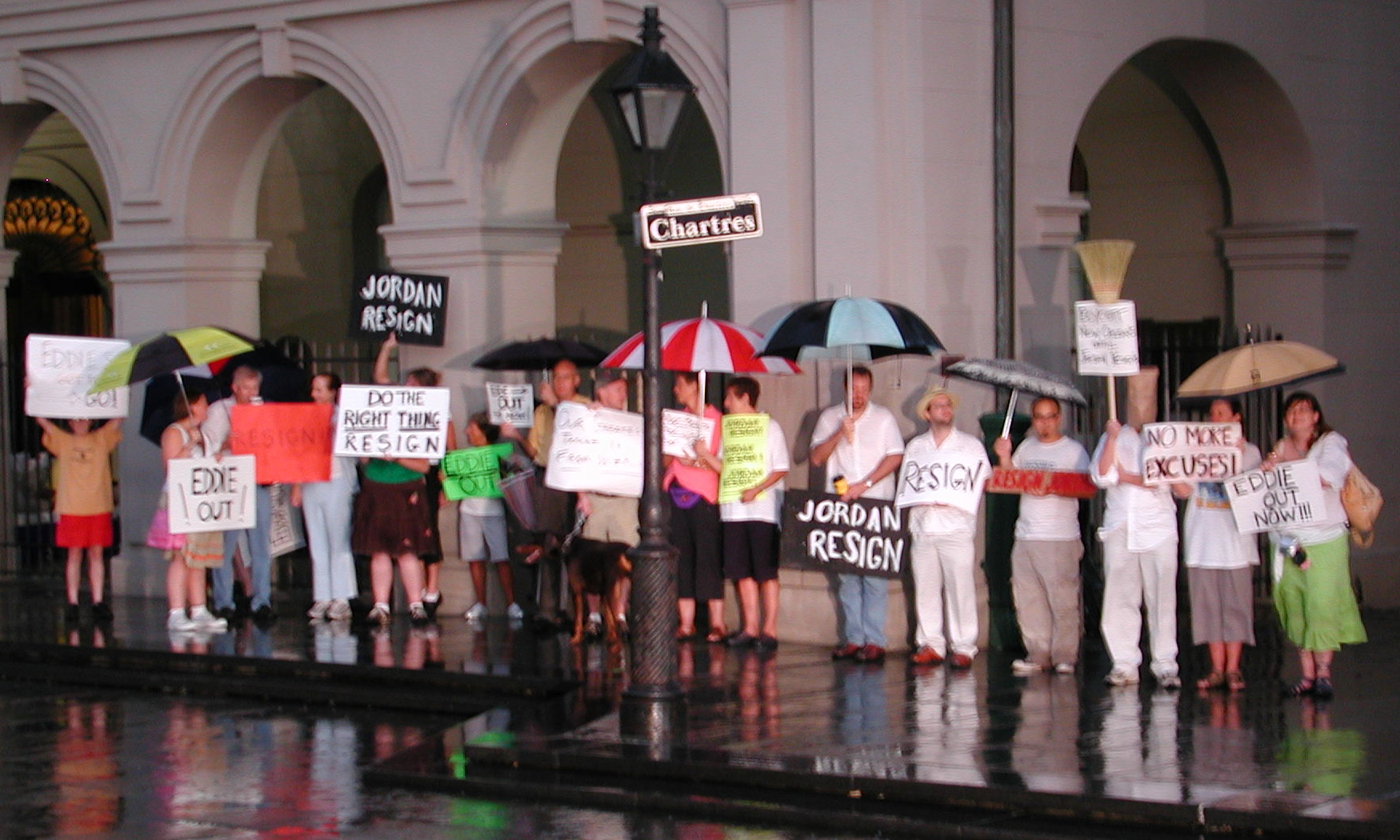
Protesters calling for Jordan's resignation, July 2007

Jordan has also faced widespread criticism for releasing suspects in high-profile murder cases. In July 2007, Jordan released Michael Anderson, a suspect in the murders of five teens. Jordan said that his office was unable to find a key witness in the case; the NOPD subsequently held a press conference a short time later, at which police officials presented the witness.

As of mid-2007, many in New Orleans had voiced complaints about Jordan regarding the low conviction rates of murderers at a time of rising violent crime. On July 12, 2007, City Council member Shelley Midura called for Jordan's resignation.

Eddie Jordan has been a close political ally of embattled New Orleans Congressman William Jefferson, a fellow Democrat who was defeated in 2008.

As the pressure built against him, Jordan resigned as District Attorney. He was succeeded on an acting basis by longtime prosecutor Keva Landrum-Johnson.

In 2005, Jordan was inducted into the Louisiana Political Museum and Hall of Fame in Winnfield.

== Other sources ==
- http://www.washtimes.com/national/20050331-010649-6205r.htm
- https://www.washingtonpost.com/wp-dyn/articles/A14124-2005Mar30.html
- https://web.archive.org/web/20060822032922/http://www.bestofneworleans.com/dispatch/2005-04-12/politics.html
- http://www.wdsu.com/news/4329972/detail.html

Legal offices
Preceded by Harry Connick Sr.	District Attorney, Orleans Parish, Louisiana; 2003–2007	Succeeded by Keva Landrum-Johnson (Acting)
