= Leslie R. Caldwell =

American lawyer (born 1957)

Leslie Caldwell
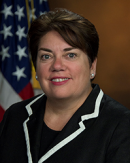

United States Assistant Attorney General for the Criminal Division
- In office May 15, 2014 – January 13, 2017
- President: Barack Obama
- Preceded by: Mythili Raman (acting)
- Succeeded by: Brian Benczkowski

Personal details
- Born: Leslie Ragon Caldwell; 1957 (age 68–69) Steubenville, Ohio, U.S.
- Party: Democratic
- Education: Pennsylvania State University (BA); George Washington University (JD)

Leslie Ragon Caldwell (born 1957) is an American attorney who served as Assistant Attorney General for the Criminal Division of the United States Department of Justice from 2014 to 2017. She has spent the majority of her professional career handling federal criminal cases as both prosecutor and defense attorney. Caldwell served as an Assistant United States Attorney in the Eastern District of New York from 1987 to 1998, after which she was recruited by then US attorney Robert Mueller to serve as chief of the Criminal Division and chief of the Securities Fraud Section of the United States Attorney's office for the Northern District of California; she served from 1999 to 2002. In September 2017, she became a partner at the law firm of Latham & Watkins in San Francisco. In late 2022, Caldwell retired from her partnership at Latham & Watkins.

== Education ==
She received a BA in economics summa cum laude from Pennsylvania State University, and a JD from George Washington University Law School.

== Private practice ==
She started her career in private practice in New York.

== US Attorney's Office ==
She then moved to the US Attorney's office in Brooklyn, in the Eastern District of New York. Proving to be a highlight of her time with the Eastern District was Caldwell's successful conviction of New York City drug lord Howard "Pappy" Mason for the murder of Officer Edward Bryne.

== Enron Task Force ==
She then was recruited by then San Francisco US Attorney Robert S. Mueller III to head his efforts against white-collar crime in Silicon Valley. After being named chief of that office's Criminal Division, Caldwell was recruited by DOJ to head up the Enron Task Force, created to spearhead the investigation of that company's 2001 collapse. Caldwell built a team of lawyers and FBI agents and successfully investigated one of the largest corporate collapses in history. She led the successful prosecutions of more than 30 former Enron executives and others, including Kenneth Lay and Jeffrey Skilling.

In 2002, Caldwell was selected to lead a team of investigators and prosecutors in the Department of Justice's Enron Task Force. In that role, she recruited a team of federal prosecutors and agents from around the country to investigate the collapse of the former Fortune No. 7 company. Under Caldwell's leadership, more than 30 individuals were successfully prosecuted for their roles in fraud at Enron, as well as several corporations, including Merrill Lynch and the Canadian Imperial Bank of Commerce.

== Private practice ==
In the wake of the Enron convictions, Caldwell turned to private practice as a partner at Morgan, Lewis & Bockius until early 2014.

== Assistant Attorney General ==
On May 15, 2014, Leslie R. Caldwell was confirmed as United States Assistant Attorney General for the Criminal Division.

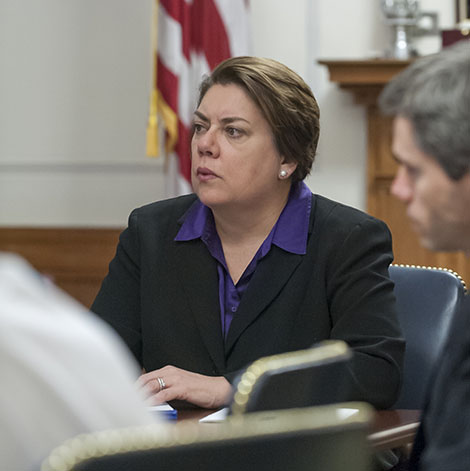
Caldwell in 2015

== Private practice ==
In September 2017, she became a partner at the law firm of Latham & Watkins in San Francisco.

In late 2022, Caldwell retired from her partnership at Latham & Watkins.
