= Project Safe Childhood =

United States Department of Justice initiative

Project Safe Childhood (PSC) is a Department of Justice initiative launched in 2006 that aims to combat the proliferation of technology-facilitated sexual exploitation crimes against children. PSC coordinates efforts by various federal, state and local agencies and organizations to protect children by investigating and prosecuting online sexual predators.

PSC partners include Internet Crimes Against Children (ICAC) task forces, the FBI, U.S. Postal Inspection Service, Immigration and Customs Enforcement, the U.S. Marshals Service, the National Center for Missing & Exploited Children, and state and local law enforcement officials in each U.S. Attorney's district.
