= Veronica DiCarlo Wicker =

American judge (1930–1994)

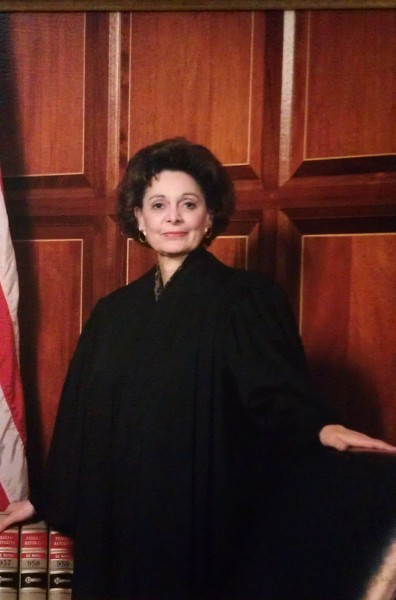

Judge of the United States District Court for the Eastern District of Louisiana
- In office September 26, 1979 – December 10, 1994
- Appointed by: Jimmy Carter
- Preceded by: Seat established by 92 Stat. 1629
- Succeeded by: Ivan L. R. Lemelle

Magistrate Judge of the United States District Court for the Eastern District of Louisiana
- In office 1977–1979

Personal details
- Born: November 26, 1930 Monessen, Pennsylvania, U.S.
- Died: December 10, 1994 (aged 64) New Orleans, Louisiana, U.S.
- Education: Syracuse University (BFA); Loyola University New Orleans (LLB)

Veronica DiCarlo Wicker (November 26, 1930 – December 10, 1994) was a United States district judge of the United States District Court for the Eastern District of Louisiana.

== Education and career ==
Born in Monessen, Pennsylvania, Wicker received a Bachelor of Fine Arts degree from Syracuse University in 1952 and a Bachelor of Laws from Loyola University New Orleans College of Law in 1966. She was a law clerk to Judge Lansing Leroy Mitchell of the United States District Court for the Eastern District of Louisiana from 1966 to 1977.

=== Federal judicial service ===
Wicker was a United States magistrate judge for the Eastern District of Louisiana, from 1977 to 1979. On June 5, 1979, Wicker was nominated by President Jimmy Carter to a new seat on the United States District Court for the Eastern District of Louisiana created by 92 Stat. 1629. She was confirmed by the United States Senate on September 25, 1979, and received her commission on September 26, 1979. Wicker served in that capacity until her death of cancer, on December 10, 1994, in New Orleans, Louisiana.

== See also ==
- List of first women lawyers and judges in Louisiana

== Sources ==
- "Veronica DiCarlo Wicker - Eastern District of Louisiana - United States District Court". www.laed.uscourts.gov.

Legal offices
Preceded by Seat established by 92 Stat. 1629	Judge of the United States District Court for the Eastern District of Louisiana; 1979–1994	Succeeded by Ivan L. R. Lemelle
