= Mose Jefferson =

Mose Oliver Jefferson (August 28, 1942 – May 12, 2011) was a member of the New Orleans family that includes his younger brother, former U.S. Representative William J. Jefferson. On 21 August 2009, Mose Jefferson was convicted on four felony counts of bribery.

== Background ==
Mose Jefferson left his native Lake Providence, Louisiana, to join his older sister Betty Jefferson in Chicago, Illinois, where he attended Marshall High School but dropped out to join the U.S. Air Force in 1959. After being honorably discharged and returning to civilian life, he was convicted of a $450 robbery and served 9 months in Stateville Correctional Center, being released in 1967. He then became a Democratic Party field lieutenant with the political organization of Robert Shaw and his brother William Shaw, the latter of whom served in the Illinois Senate from 1982 to 2002.

== Legal difficulties ==
On July 22, 2009 — during the 16-indictments trial of Mose Jefferson's brother, Congressman William J. Jefferson, before U.S. judge T. S. Ellis III — lead prosecutor Mark Lytle presented a chart which showed

money flowing from Jigawa State in Nigeria to Arkel Sugar in Baton Rouge to pay for a study of the feasibility of Arkel building a sugar plant there, to the coffers of Providence Lake, a company controlled by the congressman's brother Mose Jefferson, to BEP, another company controlled by Mose Jefferson, and on to Harvard University, where it helped pay expenses for Jelani Jefferson, one of the congressman's daughters.

On August 5, 2009, William J. Jefferson was convicted in the Virginia court on 11 of the 16 felony counts. Four days later, on August 9, in an article starting on the front page and extending for almost the entirety of another page, Laura Maggi analyzed Mose Jefferson's imputed connection with the criminal behaviors on which William J. Jefferson had been convicted.

In 2009, while other members of the Jefferson family were facing indictment or trial on various corruption charges, Mose Jefferson faced two trials. Originally a racketeering trial was to begin on August 3, 2009, followed by a bribery trial on August 10. On July 28, 2009, the sequence changed, the bribery trial remaining on August 10, 2009, and the racketeering trial moving to January 25, 2010.

=== Bribery accusations ===
In the bribery allegations Mose Jefferson was accused of paying Orleans Parish School Board president Ellenese Brooks-Simms $140,000 in exchange for her support of adopting a software-based teaching system sold by Mose Jefferson. Brooks-Simms accepted the money but, on getting caught, entered into a plea-bargain to testify (along with two other witnesses) against Mose Jefferson, including cooperating with investigators in recording certain conversations she had with Mose Jefferson. According to CBS News, the software sale was just part of a set of schemes wherein Brooks-Simms steered $14 million in sales toward a company which paid Mose Jefferson $913,000 in commissions.

=== Racketeering accusations ===
Racketeering charges under the Racketeer Influenced and Corrupt Organizations Act (RICO) involved Mose Jefferson and Renée Gill Pratt, Mose Jefferson's "long-time companion" in a relationship described as being "as close as it gets" by columnist Stephanie Grace. The indictment alleged that Gill Pratt, a former state senator and member of the New Orleans City Council (defeated in 2006 by Stacy Head), had assisted Mose Jefferson in obtaining government grants for humanitarian causes managed by him, his sister Betty Jefferson, and Betty Jefferson's daughter Angela Coleman, whereupon the Jeffersons unduly used some of the money for personal interests. Betty Jefferson and Angela Coleman were additional defendants in the racketeering trial.

=== Pre-trial Motions ===
On June 3, 2009, Mose Jefferson requested that the racketeering charge be postponed because of the then-potential time overlap with the trial on bribery charges (both trials originally being docketed to begin in August). The request for delay was probably mooted, however, by new charges arraigned on June 5, effectuating postponement of one trial (the racketeering trial) by request of the court.

==== Potential change in defense attorneys ====
The situation was further complicated by an implication that Mose Jefferson needed to obtain a new lawyer, in that Arthur "Buddy" Lemann, according to U.S. attorney Daniel Friel, faced a conflict of interest in having once represented Stacy Simms, daughter of Ellenese Brooks-Simms. Lemann was to represent Mose Jefferson in the racketeering case. Stacy Simms had assisted her mother in laundering the bribe (in the other case), through Stacy's bank account and, after pleading guilty to the felony, joined her mother in becoming a witness for the prosecution of Mose Jefferson. Lemann (arguing that "the very inclusion of allegations related to another pending indictment is improper") had objected that the racketeering indictment described a relationship to the (undecided) bribery case in that part of the alleged racketeering involved Gill Pratt's supposed obtaining of $300,000 for a couple of private schools so that they could buy the software which Mose Jefferson, with Ellenese Brooks-Simms' help, also sold to the public schools; according to the indictment, Mose Jefferson's commission on the sales to the private schools was $30,000, of which Gill Pratt pocketed $3500. "It's not RICO, it's wacko"—said Lemann on June 5 as he objected to the move to separate him from the racketeering case.

Lemann himself was not Mose Jefferson's original attorney; Lemann had replaced Ike Spears, who had earlier been disqualified on a conflict of interest inherent in his having previously represented Brenda Jefferson Foster, younger sister of Mose and William J. Jefferson. Brenda Jefferson Foster had entered a guilty plea in the racketeering case and obtained a promise of leniency in exchange for agreeing to testify against her siblings.

As of June 6, 2009, Mose Jefferson's attorney in the bribery case continued to be Mike Fawer, "another pugnacious defense attorney" as described by the Times-Picayune.

==== Political allegations by defenders ====
On June 8, 2009, Lemann called the racketeering case "a political prosecution initiated by the office of a Republican prosecutor against a minority neighborhood association led by the Jefferson family" and asked for the case to be dismissed as being politically motivated. U.S. Attorney Jim Letten claimed to be "not surprised to see that again" in reference to Lemann's having made allegations of prosecutorial political or racial bias when defending former mayor Marc Morial's administrator Kerry DeCay, who was convicted and spent 9 years in federal incarceration.

==== Indigence claim ====
Lemmon referred to magistrate judge Louis Moore Jr. the question of whether Mose Jefferson should be declared indigent, a status conference on that question set for July 28. Fawer and Lemann both asked Moore to declare Mose Jefferson indigent because a building he owns on New Orleans' Loyola Avenue was put on hold by U.S. attorney Jim Letten. Fawer and Lemann had intended to use the building as a "means of obtaining payment for their services"; but Moore, on August 6, 2009, cited that Mose Jefferson owns a New Orleans East house which he used as collateral for his bond pending trial. According to Laura Maggi of the Times-Picayune on Mose Jefferson's wherewithal to pay defense lawyers, "Moore pointed out that Jefferson could give up the bond on the house and go to jail"; Moore denied the request for indigence.

==== Requests for delay ====
At a hearing before U.S. District Judge Ivan L. R. Lemelle on June 17, 2009, lawyers for Betty Jefferson and Angela Coleman requested a delay from the August 3, 2009, start date for the racketeering trial; at the same hearing, however, lawyers for Gill Pratt and Mose Jefferson requested that the racketeering trial begin as scheduled on August 3.

During the ensuing week, on June 26, 2009, U.S. District Judge Mary Ann Vial Lemmon denied Mose Jefferson's request to delay the start of the bribery case also involving Gill Pratt and Ellenese Brooks-Simms. Fawer immediately filed a second request for delay of the bribery trial, this request arguing that Gill Pratt could not risk testifying in the racketeering case if a charge against her were to be pending in the bribery case. On July 16, 2009, Lemmon ruled as follows:

- denied Fawer's (Mose's Jefferson's) second request for delay.
- denied a motion by Fawer (representing Mose Jefferson) to stay the proceedings so that Fawer (Mose Jefferson) could appeal, to the U.S. Fifth Circuit Court of Appeals, Lemmon's June 26 denial of Fawer's (Mose Jefferson's) request for delay in the bribery trial.
- denied a Fawer motion to remove a government lien on Mose Jefferson's property on Loyola Avenue to cover Fawer's lawyer charges.
- denied a motion by Fawer to remove him as Mose Jefferson's attorney.

===== Racketeering trial delayed =====
On July 28, 2009, Lemelle delayed the start of the racketeering trial to January 25, 2010. The bribery trial of Mose Jefferson alone was still set to begin on August 10, 2009, with jury selection beginning on August 4, 2009.

===== Bribery trial not delayed =====
On August 4, Fawer unsuccessfully sought (denied by Lemmon) to delay the bribery trial until after the racketeering trial, because, as summarized by Michael Kunzelman of the Times-Picayune:

Gill Pratt ... isn't available to testify during the bribery case this month because she is awaiting her own trial next year in a [the] separate but related racketeering conspiracy case.

==== Requests for change of venue ====
On August 7, 2009, Fawer requested to move the bribery trial from New Orleans because the "trial atmosphere has been utterly corrupted by ongoing media coverage" (Fawer's words) of the conviction of William J. Jefferson; Lemmon's written denial was just two sentences in length, including that questions to potential jurors "will reveal the extent of prejudice, if any, resulting from news coverage of the trial of defendant's brother" (Lemmon's words).

== Bribery trial ==
Jury selection for Mose Jefferson's trial on charges of bribery began on August 10, 2009, with Fawer again requesting a venue change and Lemmon again denying it. By the end of the day attorneys on both sides had selected a 12-member panel of jurors—six women, six men—with two women alternates.

The bribery trial per se began on August 11 at 10:00 AM CDT, with strikingly different perspectives between the prosecution and the defense on the $140,000 which Mose Jefferson gave to Ellenese Brooks-Simms. According to Fawer, Brooks-Simms said "what the government wanted to hear" concerning the $140,000. Fawer maintained that the FBI-recorded conversations between Brooks-Simms and Mose Jefferson would be shown to concur with the defense's characterization of the exchange of money as a gift or loan to Brooks-Simms in that her husband was at the time experiencing expensive medical costs. Fawer also revealed defense plans to call as witnesses not only Mose Jefferson but also Republican former U.S. Representative Bob Livingston, head of the Livingston Group lobbying firm which represented JRL Enterprises, contractor for the "I CAN LEARN" program, in successful efforts to obtain $36 million in federal contracts. The prosecution called Paul Cambon, Livingston's former congressional aide who later became a partner in the Livingston Group. After Cambon testified that the Livingston Group had received monthly retainers of up to $30,000 from JRL Enterprises, prosecutor Michael Simpson asked: "Did the Livingston Group ever kick back $140,000?"—which question was overridden by Lemmon on Fawer's objection.

On August 18, Mose Jefferson, testifying under oath, countervailed the testimony of Brooks-Simms and characterized her as a former lover for whom the $140,000 was a gift; she had testified that they first met in 1999, but he testified that their relationship began in the 1980s.

On August 19, 2009, former Orleans Parish schools superintendent Tony Amato testified in support of the "I CAN LEARN" program, but most of the testimony on that day centered on the nature of the relationship between Mose Jefferson and Brooks-Simms. Fawer called as witness 83-year-old minister Zebedee Bridges who testified that in the 1980s Mose Jefferson was involved in an adulterous affair with Brooks-Simms, but Ralph Capitalli, attorney for Brooks-Simms, characterized the story as "a lie" and stated that Fawer had not inquired of Brooks-Simms about the alleged affair; Capitelli asserted that Brooks-Simms was loyal to her husband throughout 40 years of marriage. Prosecutor Michael Simpson, who repeatedly during the day attempted to steer the discussion back to the exchange of money and the recorded conversations between Brooks-Simms and Mose Jefferson, adopted "an incredulous tone" in that Fawer had said nothing about adultery during the opening statement and during the three days when Brooks-Simms was on the witness stand.

Before the case went to the jury on August 20, 2009, the defense called Livingston as witness, in an attempt to analogize the lobbying activities of the Livingston Group to the involvements of Mose Jefferson, Fawer's repeated arguments that the $140,000 payment could only be a gift in that adoption of I CAN LEARN already had Brooks-Simms' support as well as that of the other voting members of the school system, but Fawer's observations of the time of the payment and the prior day's testimony by Amato were "sideshows" when "This case is about payoffs and rewards" according to federal prosecutor Sal Perricone. At 6:00 PM on August 20 Lemmon ordered the jury sequestered to consider the charges against Mose Jefferson.

The following morning, on August 21, 2009, the jury returned the following verdicts declaring Mose Jefferson guilty on four of the seven felony counts, as reported by WDSU-TV New Orleans Channel 6 (NBC):

Count 1—Conspiracy to commit bribery: Not guilty
Count 2—Bribery of an agent (Brooks-Simms) of an organization seeking federal funding: Guilty
Count 3—Bribery of an agent (Brooks-Simms) of an organization seeking federal funding: Guilty
Count 4—Bribery of an agent (Brooks-Simms) of an organization seeking federal funding: Not guilty
Count 5—Money laundering: Not guilty
Count 6—Obstruction of justice: Guilty
Count 7—Obstruction of justice: Guilty

Sentencing by Lemmon was set for December 9, 2009, Mose Jefferson remaining in the meantime free on personal surety bond.

== Racketeering trial ==
Jefferson's racketeering trial began on March 22, 2010. He died of cancer in 2011 in Lake Providence.
