= Internet Crimes Against Children Task Force =

Task Force protecting children from crimes over the internet

logo of the Internet Crimes Against Children Task Force program

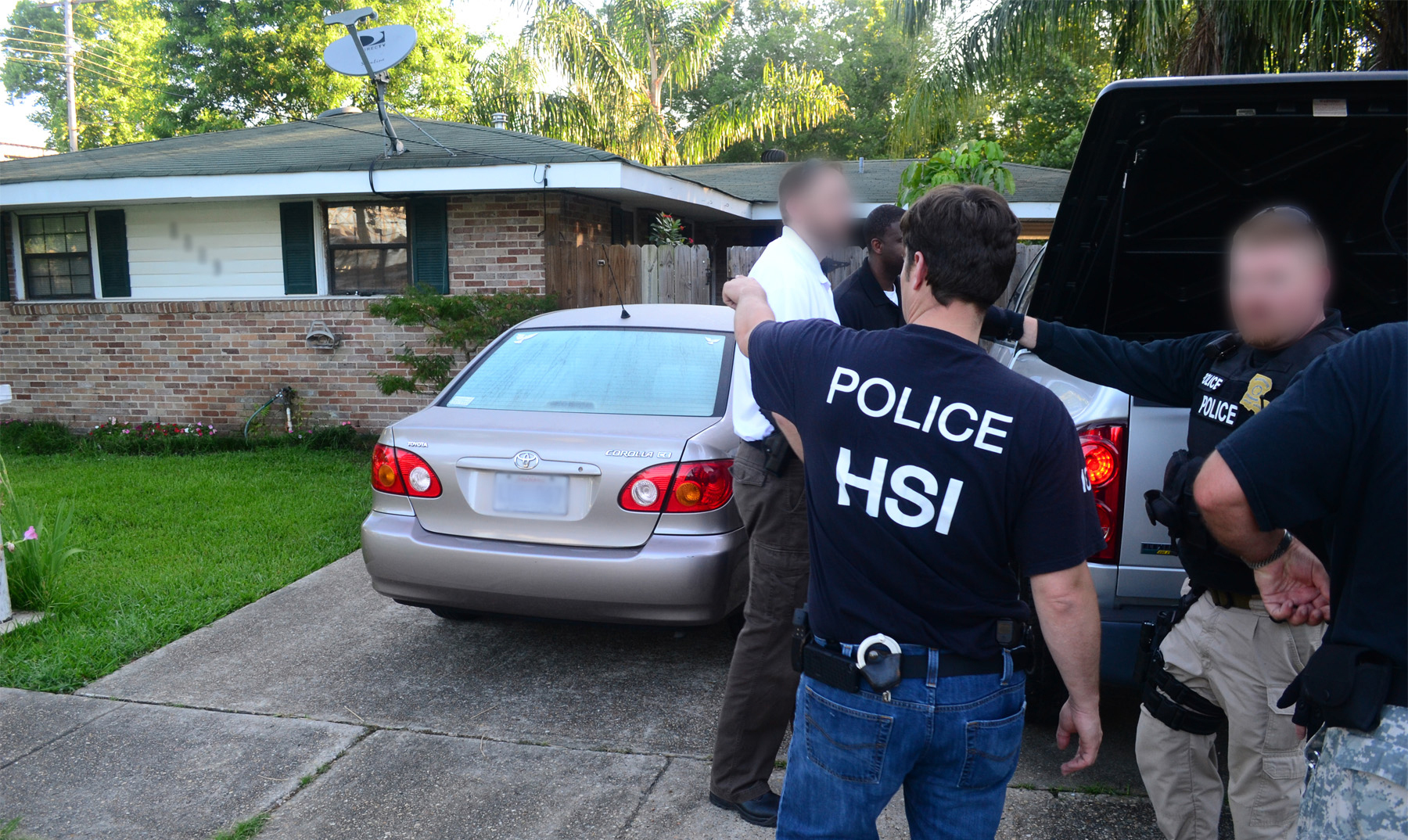
ICE arrests child predators in Operation iGuardian, May 12, 2012

The Internet Crimes Against Children Task Force program (ICAC Task Force program) is a national network of 61 coordinated task forces representing more than 5,400 federal, state, and local law enforcement and prosecutorial agencies organized by the United States Department of Justice's Office of Juvenile Justice and Delinquency Prevention (OJJDP) in 1998 to prevent Cybercrime against children. The aims of ICAC task forces are to catch distributors of child pornography on the Internet, whether delivered on-line or solicited on-line and distributed through other channels and to catch sexual predators who solicit victims on the Internet through chat rooms, forums and other methods.

On November 2, 2017, the Providing Resources, Officers, and Technology to Eradicate Cyber Threats to the Protect Our Children Act of 2017 was signed into law, reauthorizing the ICAC Task Force Program through 2022.

In 2020, the attorney of Davis County, Utah Troy Rawlings said that "a local nonprofit was conducting illegal fundraising efforts by taking credit for arrests", which had actually been made by the Davis County ICAC Task Force. He alluded to Operation Underground Railroad.

On November 15, 2022, the PROTECT Our Children Act of 2022 was passed by the United States Senate, reauthorizing ICAC and the National Strategy for Child Exploitation Prevention and Interdiction through 2024. On December 6, Congress motioned to agree without objection.

== See also ==
- Internet Watch Foundation
- National Child Victim Identification Program
