= Betty Jefferson =

Betty Jefferson (born 1938) is the elected assessor of New Orleans' Fourth Municipal District; she was first elected on 1998 February 7 and was reelected in 2002 and 2006. Before her political career in New Orleans she lived for a number of years in Chicago. She is an older sister of convicted felon former U.S. Representative William J. Jefferson.

In 2009 Betty Jefferson was a defendant in racketeering charges also involving her brother Mose Jefferson, her daughter Angela Coleman, and Renée Gill Pratt. On 2009 June 5 all the defendants pleaded not guilty.

At a hearing before U. S. District Judge Ivan L. R. Lemelle on 2009 June 17, lawyers for Betty Jefferson and Angela Coleman requested a delay from the 2009 August 3 start date for the racketeering trial; at the same hearing, however, lawyers for Gill Pratt and Mose Jefferson requested that the racketeering trial begin as scheduled on August 3. On 2009 July 28, Lemelle delayed the start of the racketeering trial to 2010 January 25.

If proved, the charges—raised under provisions of the Racketeer Influenced and Corrupt Organizations (RICO) Act—can result in up to 20 years' imprisonment, $250,000 in fines, and stiff penalties of forfeiture. Some of the charges involved fraudulent use of e-mail.

In an article starting on the front page and extending for almost the entirety of another page, Laura Maggi analyzed Betty Jefferson's imputed connection with William J. Jefferson's conviction.

She died in 2013
