= Jane Triche Milazzo =

American judge (born 1957)

Jane Margaret Triche Milazzo
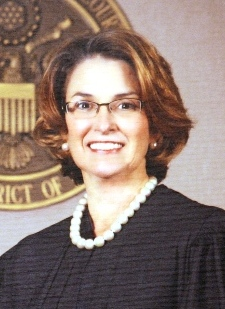

Judge of the United States District Court for the Eastern District of Louisiana
- Incumbent
- Assumed office October 12, 2011
- Appointed by: Barack Obama
- Preceded by: Mary Ann Vial Lemmon

Personal details
- Born: Jane Margaret Triche; March 2, 1957 (age 69) Napoleonville, Louisiana, U.S.
- Spouse: John Milazzo
- Relations: Philip H. Gilbert (great-grandfather); Risley Triche (father)
- Parents: Risley C. Triche 1927–2012 (father); Clara Caballero Triche (deceased) (mother)
- Education: Nicholls State University (BA); Louisiana State University (JD)

Jane Margaret Triche Milazzo (born March 2, 1957) is a United States district judge of the United States District Court for the Eastern District of Louisiana.

== Early life and education ==
A native of Napoleonville, Louisiana, Milazzo earned a Bachelor of Arts degree in 1977 from Nicholls State University. She then earned a Juris Doctor in 1992 from Louisiana State University's Paul M. Hebert Law Center.

== Career ==
Milazzo began her career as an elementary school teacher. She then began working in 1986 as a paralegal for a Napoleonville, Louisiana law firm. In 1989, she shifted to being a law clerk while attending law school. From 1992 until 1998, she served as an associate at her family's law firm, and from 1998 until 2008, she was a partner in that firm. In 2008, Milazzo was elected a state district judge in Louisiana.

=== Federal judicial service ===
On March 16, 2011, President Barack Obama nominated Milazzo to fill a seat on the United States District Court for the Eastern District of Louisiana that had been vacated by Judge Mary Ann Vial Lemmon, who assumed senior status on January 1, 2011. On October 11, 2011, the United States Senate confirmed Milazzo by a 98–0 vote. She received her judicial commission the following day. Milazzo was appointed to the bench under the name Jane Margaret Triche-Milazzo, but has since changed her name to Jane Margaret Triche Milazzo.

== Personal life ==
Milazzo is the daughter of former Louisiana politician Risley C. Triche and Clara Triche of Napoleonville, Louisiana. She is married to John W. Milazzo Jr. and they have four children and 5 grandchildren.

Legal offices
Preceded by Mary Ann Vial Lemmon	Judge of the United States District Court for the Eastern District of Louisiana; 2011–present	Incumbent
