= Ivan L. R. Lemelle =

American judge (born 1950)

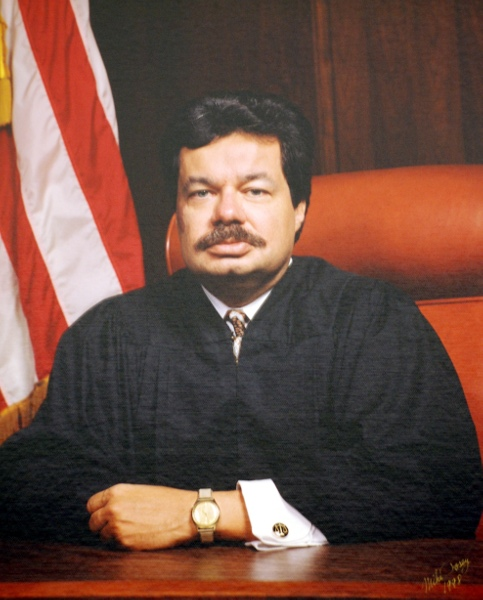

Senior Judge of the United States District Court for the Eastern District of Louisiana
- Incumbent
- Assumed office June 29, 2015

Judge of the United States District Court for the Eastern District of Louisiana
- In office April 7, 1998 – June 29, 2015
- Appointed by: Bill Clinton
- Preceded by: Veronica D. Wicker
- Succeeded by: Barry Ashe

Magistrate Judge of the United States District Court for the Eastern District of Louisiana
- In office 1984–1998

Personal details
- Born: 1950 (age 75–76) Opelousas, Louisiana, U.S.
- Education: Xavier University of Louisiana (BS); Loyola University New Orleans (JD)

Ivan L. R. Lemelle (born 1950) is a senior United States district judge of the United States District Court for the Eastern District of Louisiana.

== Early life and education ==
Born in Opelousas, Louisiana, Lemelle received a Bachelor of Science degree from Xavier University of Louisiana in 1971 and a Juris Doctor from Loyola University New Orleans School of Law in 1974. He was a law clerk for Robert Collins of the Orleans Parish Criminal District Court from 1972 to 1974.

== Career ==
Lemelle was an assistant district attorney of Orleans Parish from 1974 to 1977. He was in private practice in New Orleans from 1977 to 1981. He was an assistant city attorney of New Orleans from 1977 to 1978. He was an assistant state attorney general of Louisiana Department of Justice from 1980 to 1984.

=== Federal judicial service ===
Lemelle served as United States magistrate judge of the United States District Court for the Eastern District of Louisiana from 1984 to 1998.

On February 12, 1997, Lemelle was nominated by President Bill Clinton to a seat on the United States District Court for the Eastern District of Louisiana vacated by Judge Veronica D. Wicker. He was confirmed by the United States Senate on April 3, 1998, and received his commission on April 7, 1998. He assumed senior status on June 29, 2015.

=== Notable cases ===
- In 2009, Lemelle was assigned the Racketeer Influenced and Corrupt Organizations Act (RICO) case alleged against Renée Gill Pratt and Mose Jefferson, brother of former U.S. representative William J. Jefferson, who simultaneously stood indicted on sixteen counts in federal court in Virginia. On 2009 July 28, Lemelle delayed the start of the racketeering trial to 2010 January 25. In two separate trials during August 2009, William J. Jefferson was convicted on 11 felony counts related to bribery; Mose Jefferson, on four.
- In 2009, Lemelle heard a real estate fraud case against Michael O'Keefe Jr. (born c. 1959), the son of former Louisiana State Senate President Michael H. O'Keefe Sr. The younger O'Keefe was at the time the president of Citywide Mortgage Company of New Orleans. He pleaded guilty to making false statements during a transaction with the United States Department of Housing and Urban Development. The scam involved fraudulent appraisals, credit documents, and loan applications. O'Keefe was ordered to pay nearly $700,000 in restitution. He also served in prison for nearly two years.
- On September 11, 2009, Lemelle visited Kentwood High School and O. W. Dillon Memorial Elementary School (both in Kentwood, Louisiana), Roseland Elementary School (in Roseland, Louisiana), and Northwood Preparatory High School (in Amite, Louisiana)—all in Tangipahoa Parish. The three schools are subject to potential changes, depending on Lemelle's ruling on a 4-decades-old desegregation-related settlement.

== Legacy ==
In November 2020, it was proposed by the New Orleans City Council Street Renaming Commission that Capdevielle Street (named after Paul Capdevielle, a Confederate hero and former mayor) be renamed for Lemelle. He was the only living person proposed for such an honor. The decision process was ongoing as of February 2021.

== Personal life ==
Lemelle is Catholic, raised in Holy Ghost Catholic Church in Opelousas, the largest Black Catholic church in the country.

== See also ==
- List of African-American federal judges
- List of African-American jurists

== Sources ==
Legal offices
| Preceded by Veronica D. Wicker | Judge of the United States District Court for the Eastern District of Louisiana; 1998–2015 | Succeeded by Barry Ashe |
