= Renée Gill Pratt =

American politician

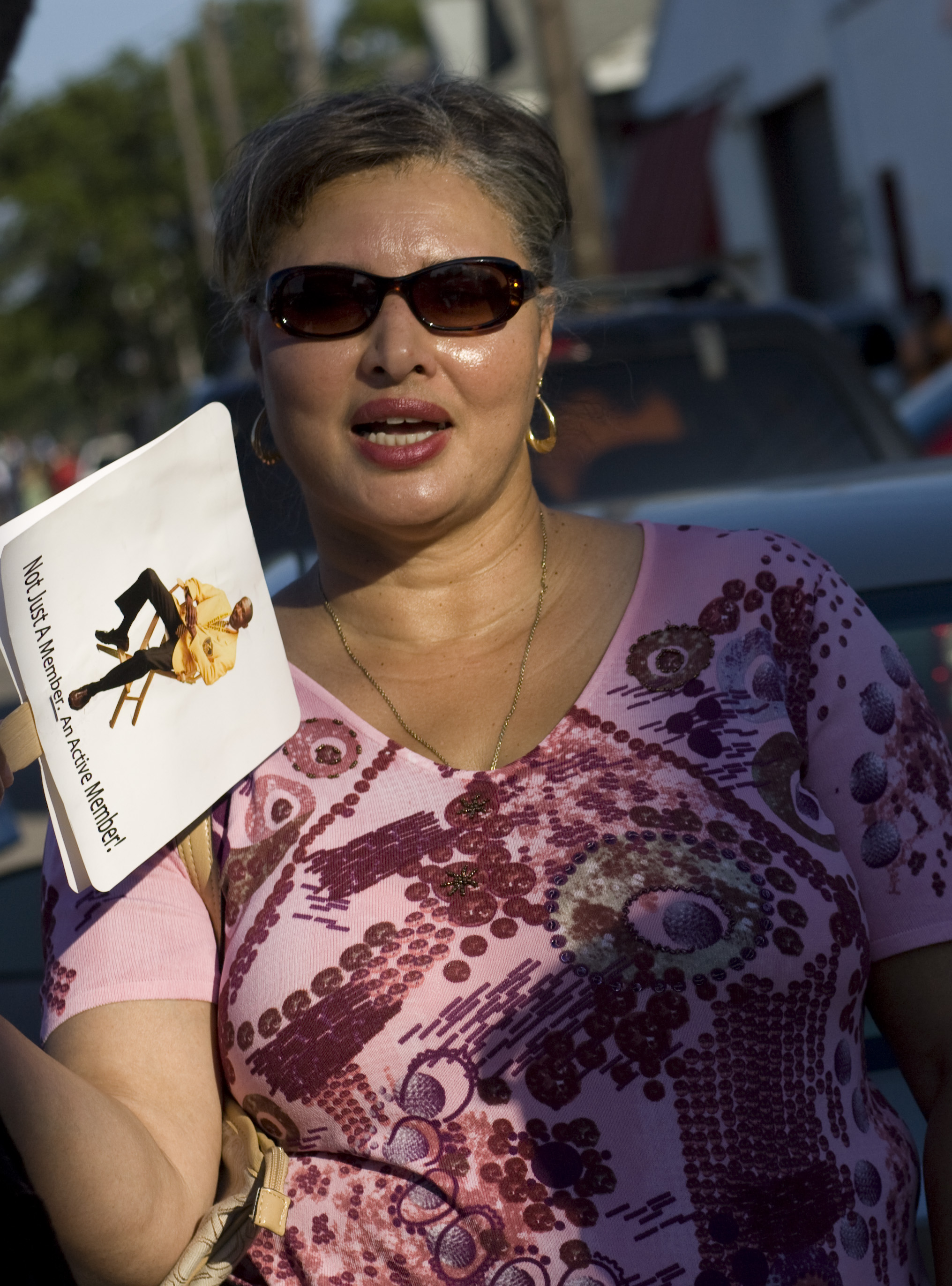
- Gill Pratt in 2009

Member of the New Orleans City Council from District B
- In office 2006–2010
- Preceded by: Oliver Thomas
- Succeeded by: Stacey Head

Member of the Louisiana House of Representatives for the 91st District
- In office 1991–2002
- Preceded by: Diana Bajoie
- Succeeded by: Rosalind Peychaud

Personal details
- Born: 1954 (age 71–72)
- Party: Democratic
- Education: Dillard University; University of New Orleans
- Alma mater: Jackson State University; Tulane University

Renée Gill Pratt (born 1954) is an American politician from New Orleans, Louisiana. She was also Director of the Center for Student Retention and Success in Southern University at New Orleans. On July 25, 2011, she was found guilty of racketeering. For this crime, she served a four-year sentence.

== Political career ==
A Democrat, Gill Pratt began her tenure in the Louisiana House of Representatives for District 91 in 1991, when she was elected to succeed Diana Bajoie, who was the victor in a special election for the District 5 seat in the Louisiana State Senate. Gill Pratt served in the House until 2002, when she was succeeded by Rosalind Peychaud. Gill Pratt served on the New Orleans city council for District B from 2002 to 2006.

District B includes the Central Business District, the Garden District, Central City, the Irish Channel, the Lower Garden District and the Touro neighborhood. District 91 covers the precincts located on the southwest side of District B, roughly corresponding to the Irish Channel and the Touro neighborhood.

Gill Pratt lost her bid for re-election in 2006, against Stacy Head, another Democrat and a New Orleans attorney.

== Controversies ==
In May 2009 Gill Pratt—along with Mose Jefferson, Betty Jefferson, and Angela Coleman (Betty Jefferson's daughter)—was indicted on federal racketeering charges. Mose Jefferson was also facing a separate trial for bribing Orleans Parish School Board president Ellenese Brooks-Simms. The racketeering indictment contained a relationship to the bribery case in that part of the alleged racketeering involved Gill Pratt's supposed obtaining of $300,000 for a couple of private schools so that they could buy the software which Mose Jefferson, with Ellenese Brooks-Simms' help, also sold to the public schools; according to the indictment, Mose Jefferson's commission on the sales to the private schools was $30,000, of which Gill Pratt pocketed $3500. Within a week of the indictment of Gill Pratt, John Pope reported in the Times-Picayune that Gill Pratt was being appointed to a SUNO position which carries no additional pay. In the same article Pope described Mose Jefferson as "Gill Pratt's longtime companion"—a situation noted as being "as close as it gets" by columnist Stephanie Grace. Gill Pratt's appointment to SUNO's Executive Cabinet was immediately criticized by, among others, Louisiana Governor Bobby Jindal. Amid astonishment over the appropriateness and timing of the appointment—in that all Louisiana public universities were facing steep budget cuts and suggestions were circulating that SUNO should be merged with the neighboring University of New Orleans—Gill Pratt, with the urging of SUNO chancellor Victor Ukpolo, went on a leave of absence without pay.

Gill Pratt had not been seen in public since 22 May 2009 when on June 5 she—along with Mose Jefferson, Betty Jefferson, and Angela Coleman—pleaded "not guilty" before U.S. magistrate Joseph Wilkinson Jr. at the Hale Boggs Federal Building in New Orleans. Gill Pratt's lawyer was Michael Fawer, who also represents Mose Jefferson in a separate bribery case.

At a hearing before U. S. District Judge Ivan L. R. Lemelle on 17 June 2009, lawyers for Betty Jefferson and Angela Coleman requested a delay from the 3 August 2009 start date for the racketeering trial; at the same hearing, however, lawyers for Gill Pratt and Mose Jefferson requested that the racketeering trial begin as scheduled on August 3. On 28 July 2009, Lemelle delayed the start of the racketeering trial to 25 January 2010.

On August 4, Fawer unsuccessfully sought (denied by U.S. District Judge Mary Ann Vial Lemmon) to delay Mose Jefferson's bribery trial until after the racketeering trial, because, as summarized by Michael Kunzelman of the Times-Picayune:

Gill Pratt . . . isn't available to testify during the bribery case this month because she is awaiting her own trial next year in a [the] separate but related racketeering conspiracy case.

On 21 August 2009 Mose Jefferson was convicted on four felony counts in his bribery trial.

On February 24, 2011, one juror's siding with Gill Pratt resulted in a mistrial. The Times-Picayune editorialized over the hung jury, citing what the newspaper called "the criminal enterprise run by some members of the Jefferson family." But, during the retrial, in July 2011, she was found guilty. On September 2, 2014, more than three years after her conviction, Gill Pratt reported to a minimum-security federal prison camp in Florida to begin serving a four-year sentence.

== Education ==
A lifelong resident of District B, Gill Pratt attended Holy Ghost Elementary School, Xavier University Preparatory School, Dillard University, and the University of New Orleans.

== Election history ==
State Representative, 91st Representative District, Spring 1991

Threshold > 50%

First Ballot, March 23, 1991

Candidate	Affiliation	Support	Outcome
Renée Gill Pratt	Democratic	853 (29%)	Runoff
Linda Compton	Democratic	757 (25%)	Runoff
Others	n.a.	1,375 (46%)	Defeated

Second Ballot, April 20, 1991

Candidate	Affiliation	Support	Outcome
Renée Gill Pratt	Democratic	1,246 (52%)	Elected
Linda Compton	Democratic	1,159 (48%)	Defeated

State Representative, 91st Representative District, Fall 1991

Threshold > 50%

First Ballot, October 10, 1991

Candidate	Affiliation	Support	Outcome
Renée Gill Pratt	Democratic	7,605 (72%)	Elected
Louella Givens	Republican	2,941 (28%)	Defeated

Councilmember, District B, 1994

Threshold > 50%

First Ballot, February 5, 1994

Candidate	Affiliation	Support	Outcome
Oliver Thomas	Democratic	9,467 (42%)	Runoff
Renée Gill Pratt	Democratic	8,609 (38%)	Runoff
Others	n.a.	4,651 (20%)	Defeated

Second Ballot, March 5, 1994

Candidate	Affiliation	Support	Outcome
Oliver Thomas	Democratic	13,964 (52%)	Elected
Renée Gill Pratt	Democratic	13,042 (48%)	Defeated

State Representative, 91st Representative District, 1995

Threshold > 50%

First Ballot, October 21, 1995

Candidate	Affiliation	Support	Outcome
Renée Gill Pratt	Democratic	6,903 (78%)	Elected
George Patterson	Democratic	1,933 (22%)	Defeated

State Representative, 91st Representative District, 1999

Threshold > 50%

First Ballot, October 23, 1999

Candidate	Affiliation	Support	Outcome
Renée Gill Pratt	Democratic	No opponents	Elected

Councilmember, District B, 2002

Threshold > 50%

First Ballot, February 2, 2002

Candidate	Affiliation	Support	Outcome
Renée Gill Pratt	Democratic	14,016 (77%)	Elected
Kenneth Bazile	Democratic	3,783 (14%)	Defeated
Donald Ray Pryor	Democratic	1,526 (8%)	Defeated

Councilmember, District B, 2006

Threshold > 50%

First Ballot, April 22, 2006

Candidate	Affiliation	Support	Outcome
Renée Gill Pratt	Democratic	7,042 (40%)	Runoff
Stacy Head	Democratic	6,691 (38%)	Runoff
Others	n.a.	3,893 (22%)	Defeated

Second Ballot, May 20, 2006

Candidate	Affiliation	Support	Outcome
Stacy Head	Democratic	10,214 (54%)	Elected
Renée Gill Pratt	Democratic	8,694 (46%)	Defeated

== Sources ==
- City of New Orleans : https://web.archive.org/web/20051108055806/http://www.cityofno.com/
- Louisiana Secretary of State : http://www.sos.louisiana.gov/
- New Orleans Gambit: http://www.bestofneworleans.com/dispatch/2006-07-11/politics.php

Louisiana House of Representatives
Preceded by Diana Bajoie (D)	Louisiana Legislature House District 91 (Orleans Parish); 1991–2002	Succeeded by Rosalind Peychaud (D)
Political offices
Preceded by Oliver Thomas (D)	Councilmember, District B 2002–2006	Succeeded by Stacy Head (D)
