= Harry Connick Sr. =

American attorney (1926–2024)

District Attorney of Orleans Parish
- In office April 1, 1974 – January 10, 2003
- Preceded by: Jim Garrison
- Succeeded by: Eddie Jordan

Personal details
- Born: Joseph Harry Fowler Connick; March 27, 1926 Mobile, Alabama, U.S.
- Died: January 25, 2024 (aged 97) New Orleans, Louisiana, U.S.
- Party: Democratic
- Spouses: Anita Levy Livingston (died 1981); Londa Matherne (m. 1995)
- Children: 2, including Harry Jr.
- Relatives: Patrick Connick (nephew)
- Education: Loyola University New Orleans (BA); Tulane University (JD)

Joseph Harry Fowler Connick Sr. (March 27, 1926 – January 25, 2024) was an American attorney who served as the district attorney of Orleans Parish, Louisiana, from 1973 to 2003. His son, Harry Connick Jr., is a musician and actor.

== Early life ==
Joseph Harry Fowler Connick was born in Mobile, Alabama, on March 27, 1926, the second of eight children of Jessie Catherine (née Fowler, 1898–1985) and James Paul Connick (1901–1979). Both his parents and grandparents were from Mobile. His father worked for the United States Army Corps of Engineers. When Harry was two years old, the family moved to New Orleans. Music was a large part of his early life, and he was particularly influenced by Glenn Miller. After high school, he served in the U.S. Navy in the Pacific during World War II. After the war, he returned to New Orleans and graduated from Loyola University New Orleans with a degree in business administration.

Connick later joined the U.S. Army Corps of Engineers as a civilian employee, where he met his future wife, Anita Livingston, an accomplished flute player who became a lawyer and judge. She was one of the first female judges in the city of New Orleans. They married in Tunisia, and spent time in Casablanca, where Connick Sr. contracted tuberculosis. They were sent back to the United States and eventually ended up in New Orleans again. When Harry and Anita Connick returned to New Orleans, they opened a record store. Ultimately they owned two stores while simultaneously pursuing law degrees, one working in the store while the other was at school. They also had a daughter, Suzanna, and a son, Harry Jr.

== Music and life in New Orleans ==
In New Orleans, Connick was frequently involved with local music and culture. In 1993, he and his son were part of the group that founded the Krewe of Orpheus, a superkrewe that participates in annual Mardi Gras parades. He was nicknamed "The Singing District Attorney" by Time magazine. This nickname was given to him because he spent many nights singing in clubs in the French Quarter, including Maxwell's Toulouse Cabaret.

== New Orleans District Attorney ==
In 1973, Connick defeated incumbent New Orleans District Attorney Jim Garrison, who had recently been tried and acquitted of corruption charges. As district attorney, he was the defendant and petitioner in Connick v. Myers, a free-speech case in public-employment law. In the case, Connick asked Sheila Myers to take a transfer to another position in his office. She had resisted, finally saying she would consider it after a meeting with Connick. Later the same day, she distributed a questionnaire on issues of employee morale to her fellow prosecutors, after which Connick fired her.

Myers sued in federal court, alleging Connick violated her First Amendment rights by firing her. He maintained she had been fired for refusing the transfer, but judge Jack Gordon of the Eastern District of Louisiana held that the distribution of the questionnaire was speech on a matter of public concern and thus constitutionally protected. Since the facts indicated to Judge Gordon that Myers had been fired for it, he ordered her reinstated. After the Fifth Circuit affirmed Gordon, the Supreme Court granted certiorari and narrowly reversed the ruling, holding that Myers' questionnaire largely touched on matters internal to the office that were not of public concern and thus she was lawfully fired.

In 1987, Connick waged an unsuccessful challenge to incumbent William J. "Billy" Guste Jr. for the position of Louisiana Attorney General. Guste prevailed over Connick, 516,658 (54%) to 440,984 (46%). Both were registered Democrats, but in Louisiana a general election can feature two members of the same party. In 1989, Connick was indicted on racketeering charges for aiding and abetting a gambling operation by returning gambling records to an arrested gambler. He stated that he returned the records to the man in question because he needed them to file tax returns. On July 25, 1990, he was acquitted.

In 1995, while district attorney, Connick promised to the Assassination Records Review Board and at a public meeting in New Orleans that he would donate the Garrison investigative files, which were still in his office. According to the review board's final report, Connick instructed one of his investigators, Gary Raymond, to destroy these documents after he took office. Raymond took them home instead and kept them because he did not feel right about burning the records, stating, "It's not every day you are assigned to burn the records of investigations into the assassination of a president." When he found out about the review board in 1995, he gave the records to television reporter Richard Angelico for Angelico to deliver the records to Congress, stating, "When Congress asks for all documents, they mean all documents." A battle ensued between Connick and the Review Board after Connick demanded that the papers were returned to him and threatening to withhold the investigation papers. After many subpoenas going both ways, and with the help of the U.S. Department of Justice, the Review Board won and all of the documents in question are in the JFK Collection.

In 2003, Connick did not seek re-election and was inducted into the Louisiana Political Museum and Hall of Fame in Winnfield.

== Controversies ==
=== Prosecutorial misconducts and innocents on death row ===
There are several allegations of systemic misconduct by Connick and his prosecutors. "According to the Innocence Project, a national organization that represents incarcerated criminals claiming innocence, 36 men convicted in Orleans Parish during Connick's 30-year tenure as DA have made allegations of prosecutorial misconduct, and 19 have had their sentences overturned or reduced as a result." In the case of Shareef Cousin, Connick's attorneys withheld a key witness statement from the defense, arguing that the prosecution was under no legal obligation to disclose such information. As a result, Cousin was put on death row at the age of 16, but the conviction and death sentence were overturned after four years, in 1999.

Conversely, Connick's office was also accused of not prosecuting in a timely manner. In 1988, Dino Cinel, a priest at St. Rita's Parish in New Orleans, of which Connick was a parishioner, was found to have produced child sexual abuse materials of himself and boys in the rectory of the parish, where he was living at the time. Connick's office allowed the parish to hold onto the tapes for an extended period of time and initially declined to prosecute, citing lack of sufficient evidence. After a series of television interviews aired on WWL-TV and WDSU-TV, attracting media attention and outrage (including a Vanity Fair article that details the relationship between Connick and Cinel), Connick reversed his decision and charged Cinel in 1995. The latter was acquitted because he had made and/or acquired the tapes prior to child pornography laws being enacted in 1986.

=== Thompson lawsuit ===
In 2007, John Thompson, who was wrongfully convicted of murder by Connick's DA office due to evidence withholding, was awarded a $14 million verdict by a federal court jury. The jury found that "Thompson's 18 years behind bars (14 of which he spent in solitary confinement on death row) were caused by Connick's deliberate failure to train his prosecutors on their obligations to turn over exculpatory evidence." The Orleans Parish DA's office appealed and the case, Connick v. Thompson, was orally argued before the U.S. Supreme Court during the October 2010 term. By a 5–4 vote split along ideological lines, the Supreme Court overturned the $14 million award in a decision issued on March 29, 2011.

The majority opinion, written by Justice Clarence Thomas, construed the series of admitted violations not to amount to a pattern of "similar" violations of Brady v. Maryland (1963), and such a pattern was necessary to hold Connick liable for the incompetence of his employees. The dissenting opinion, read from the bench by Justice Ruth Bader Ginsburg, noted that Connick's office had in fact committed a pattern of violations, failing to disclose exculpatory blood type evidence, failing to disclose audio tapes of witness testimony, failing to disclose a deathbed confession of evidence destruction by the prosecuting attorney Gerry Deegan, and failing to disclose eyewitness identification of the killer that did not match Thompson. Ginsburg noted that the office had employee turnover so high a young attorney could advance to a senior supervisory position within four years, thus the office offered little training in ongoing developments in criminal procedure law despite its large number of inexperienced attorneys.

== Personal life ==
Connick was a Roman Catholic of Irish, English, Northern Irish, and German ancestry. Connick's first wife, Anita Frances Livingston Connick (née Levy), was Jewish. They raised their two children, Suzanna and Harry Jr., in the Lakeview neighborhood of New Orleans. Harry Connick Jr. is a musician, actor, and television show host. Anita died of ovarian cancer in July 1981. Connick later married Londa Jean Matherne on March 25, 1995, in County Tipperary, Ireland. Connick was the uncle of Jefferson Parish District Attorney Paul Connick and State Senator Patrick Connick, also of Jefferson Parish. Harry Connick Sr. died in New Orleans on January 25, 2024, at the age of 97.

Legal offices
Preceded by Jim Garrison	District Attorney, Orleans Parish, Louisiana; 1973–2003	Succeeded by Eddie Jordan
