= United States Department of Justice Criminal Division =

Main federal anti-crime agency

- Seal of the United States Department of Justice

Division overview
- Formed: 1919
- Jurisdiction: United States government agency
- Headquarters: Robert F. Kennedy Department of Justice Building 950 Pennsylvania Avenue NW Washington, D.C., United States
- Division executives: Andrew Duva, Assistant Attorney General; Matthew R. Galeotti, Principal Deputy Assistant Attorney General
- Parent department: U.S. Department of Justice
- Website: Official website

The United States Department of Justice Criminal Division is a federal agency of the United States Department of Justice that develops, enforces, and supervises the application of all federal criminal laws in the United States. Criminal Division attorneys prosecute many nationally significant cases and formulate and implement criminal enforcement policy. Division attorneys also provide advice and guidance to the attorney general of the United States, the United States Congress, and the White House on matters of criminal law. The Division was founded in 1919.

== Office of the Assistant Attorney General ==
The Criminal Division is headed by an assistant attorney general, appointed by the president of the United States with the advice and consent of the Senate. Kenneth Polite was appointed by President Joe Biden and sworn in as assistant attorney general on July 21, 2021. Nicholas McQuaid was appointed Principal Deputy Assistant Attorney General on January 20, 2021, and served as Acting Assistant Attorney General until Polite's confirmation. Polite's tenure ended on July 28, 2023 after it was announced he would step down to enter the private sector.

== Organization ==
The assistant attorney general is assisted by six Deputy Assistant Attorneys General, four of whom are career attorneys, who each oversee two or more of the Criminal Division's 16 sections.

- Principal Deputy Assistant Attorney General
- Chief of Staff and Counselor to the Assistant Attorney General
  - Office of Administration
  - Office of Policy and Legislation
- Deputy Assistant Attorney General

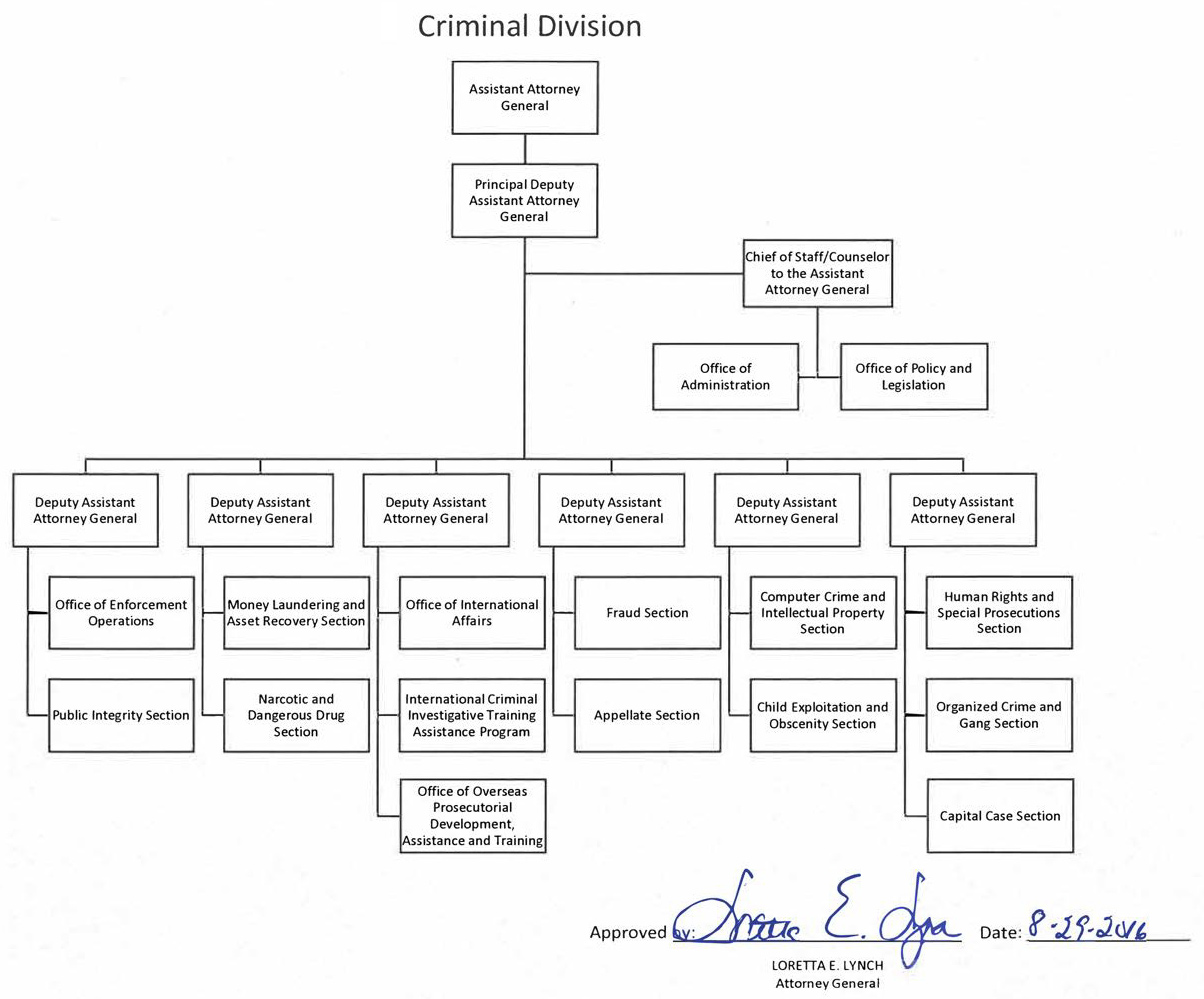
Criminal Division organizational chart signed by AG Loretta Lynch (August 2016)

  - Public Integrity Section created after Watergate in 1976
  - Money Laundering and Asset Recovery Section (MLARS)
- Deputy Assistant Attorney General
  - Narcotic and Dangerous Drug Section
  - Office of Enforcement Operations
- Deputy Assistant Attorney General
  - Office of International Affairs
  - International Criminal Investigative Training Assistance Program formed in 1990
  - Office of Overseas Prosecutorial Development Assistance and Training
- Deputy Assistant Attorney General
  - Fraud Section established in 1955
  - Appellate Section
- Deputy Assistant Attorney General
  - Computer Crime and Intellectual Property Section formed in 1996
  - Child Exploitation and Obscenity Section (CEOS). Created in 1987, the section comprises approximately 15 attorneys who prosecute defendants who have violated federal child exploitation and obscenity laws and also assist the 93 United States Attorney Offices in investigations, trials, and appeals related to these offenses. The section also has a number of Computer Forensic Specialist (CFS) within the High Technology Investigative Unit (HTIU) and, under the direction of a section manager, they conduct analysis of Internet technologies used to distribute obscene materials and child pornography.
- Deputy Assistant Attorney General
  - Capital Case Section
  - Human Rights and Special Prosecutions Section
  - Violent Crime and Racketeering Section (Formerly known as the Organized Crime and Gang Section)

The Criminal Division does not supervise the 94 U.S. Attorney's Offices, but rather works alongside the U.S. Attorney offices as subject matter experts.

=== Reorganization ===
The Criminal Division's Counterterrorism and Counterespionage Sections were transferred to the newly created United States Department of Justice National Security Division in 2006.

== See also ==
- National Child Victim Identification Program
- Obscenity Prosecution Task Force
- Operation Protect Our Children
