= List of United States attorneys appointed by Donald Trump =

This is a list of United States attorneys appointed by the 45th and 47th president of the United States, Donald Trump.

During his first term, President Trump nominated 86 people to be U.S. attorneys, and 84 of them were confirmed. There are a total of 93 U.S. attorneys in the Department of Justice.

During Trump's first term, seven U.S. attorneys named were women, including acting attorneys, and one of his first 42 appointments was a woman. Seven individuals named to vacancies among the 93 positions were people of color.

== Appointments ==
Denotes interim appointee.

=== First term ===
District	Attorney	Assumed office	Left office
Alabama
U.S. Attorney for the M.D. of Alabama	Louis V. Franklin Sr.	September 21, 2017	February 26, 2021
U.S. Attorney for the N.D. of Alabama	Jay Town	August 11, 2017	July 15, 2020
U.S. Attorney for the N.D. of Alabama	Prim F. Escalona	July 16, 2020	February 20, 2026
U.S. Attorney for the S.D. of Alabama	Richard W. Moore	September 22, 2017	February 26, 2021
Alaska
U.S. Attorney for the District of Alaska	Bryan Schroder	November 21, 2017	February 28, 2021
Arizona
U.S. Attorney for the District of Arizona	Michael G. Bailey	June 2019	February 28, 2021
Arkansas
U.S. Attorney for the E.D. of Arkansas	J. Cody Hiland	October 10, 2017	December 31, 2020
U.S. Attorney for the W.D. of Arkansas	Duane Kees	January 5, 2018	January 17, 2020
U.S. Attorney for the W.D. of Arkansas	David Clay Fowlkes	January 17, 2020	February 6, 2026
California
U.S. Attorney for the C.D. of California	Nicola T. Hanna	January 5, 2018 (Interim) (Confirmed to a four-year term on April 26, 2018)	January 8, 2021
U.S. Attorney for the E.D. of California	McGregor W. Scott	December 29, 2017	February 28, 2021
U.S. Attorney for the N.D. of California	David L. Anderson	January 15, 2019	February 27, 2021
U.S. Attorney for the S.D. of California	Robert S. Brewer Jr.	January 16, 2019	February 28, 2021
Colorado
U.S. Attorney for the District of Colorado	Jason R. Dunn	October 26, 2018	February 28, 2021
Connecticut
U.S. Attorney for the District of Connecticut	John Durham	February 22, 2018	February 28, 2021
Delaware
U.S. Attorney for the District of Delaware	David C. Weiss	February 22, 2018	January 17, 2025
District of Columbia
U.S. Attorney for the District of Columbia	Jessie K. Liu	September 24, 2017	January 31, 2020
U.S. Attorney for the District of Columbia	Michael R. Sherwin	May 18, 2020 (Interim)	March 3, 2021
Florida
U.S. Attorney for the M.D. of Florida	Maria Chapa Lopez	January 5, 2018 (Interim) (Confirmed to a four-year term on August 28, 2018)	February 27, 2021
U.S. Attorney for the N.D. of Florida	Larry Keefe	January 9, 2019	February 28, 2021
U.S. Attorney for the S.D. of Florida	Ariana Fajardo Orshan	September 18, 2018	March 26, 2021
Georgia
U.S. Attorney for the M.D. of Georgia	Charles Peeler	November 22, 2017	December 11, 2020
U.S. Attorney for the M.D. of Georgia	Peter D. Leary	December 14, 2020	January 11, 2025
U.S. Attorney for the N.D. of Georgia	B. J. Pak	October 10, 2017	January 4, 2021
U.S. Attorney for the S.D. of Georgia	Bobby Christine	November 22, 2017	February 9, 2021
Guam and the Northern Mariana Islands
Hawaii
U.S. Attorney for the District of Hawaii	Kenji M. Price	January 5, 2018 (Interim) (Confirmed to a four-year term on April 26, 2018)	February 21, 2021
Idaho
U.S. Attorney for the District of Idaho	Bart Davis	September 21, 2017	February 28, 2021
Illinois
U.S. Attorney for the C.D. of Illinois	John C. Milhiser	October 31, 2018 (Confirmed to a four-year term on January 2, 2019)	February 28, 2021
U.S. Attorney for the N.D. of Illinois	John R. Lausch Jr.	November 22, 2017	March 11, 2023
Indiana
U.S. Attorney for the N.D. of Indiana	Thomas Kirsch	October 10, 2017	December 18, 2020
U.S. Attorney for the S.D. of Indiana	Joshua Minkler	October 10, 2017	November 21, 2020
Iowa
U.S. Attorney for the N.D. of Iowa	Peter Deegan	September 21, 2017	February 17, 2021
U.S. Attorney for the S.D. of Iowa	Marc Krickbaum	October 2, 2017	January 7, 2021
Kansas
U.S. Attorney for the District of Kansas	Stephen McAllister	January 25, 2018	February 28, 2021
Kentucky
U.S. Attorney for the E.D. of Kentucky	Robert M. Duncan Jr.	November 21, 2017	January 24, 2021
U.S. Attorney for the W.D. of Kentucky	Russell Coleman	September 22, 2017	January 20, 2021
Louisiana
U.S. Attorney for the M.D. of Louisiana	Brandon Fremin	February 23, 2018	February 28, 2021
U.S. Attorney for the W.D. of Louisiana	David C. Joseph	March 30, 2018	August 3, 2020
U.S. Attorney for the E.D. of Louisiana	Peter G. Strasser	September 10, 2018	February 28, 2021
Maine
U.S. Attorney for the District of Maine	Halsey Frank	October 10, 2017	February 28, 2021
Maryland
U.S. Attorney for the District of Maryland	Robert K. Hur	April 9, 2018	February 15, 2021
Massachusetts
U.S. Attorney for the District of Massachusetts	Andrew Lelling	December 21, 2017	February 28, 2021
Michigan
U.S. Attorney for the E.D. of Michigan	Matthew J. Schneider	January 5, 2018 (Interim) (Confirmed to a four-year term on January 2, 2019)	February 1, 2021
Minnesota
U.S. Attorney for the District of Minnesota	Erica MacDonald	June 11, 2018	February 28, 2021
Mississippi
U.S. Attorney for the N.D. of Mississippi	William C. Lamar	November 22, 2017	February 27, 2021
U.S. Attorney for the S.D. of Mississippi	D. Michael Hurst Jr.	October 10, 2017	January 19, 2021
Missouri
U.S. Attorney for the E.D. of Missouri	Jeffrey Jensen	October 6, 2017	December 30, 2020
U.S. Attorney for the W.D. of Missouri	Timothy A. Garrison	January 5, 2018 (Interim) (Confirmed to a four-year term on April 26, 2018)	February 28, 2021
Montana
U.S. Attorney for the District of Montana	Kurt Alme	September 21, 2017	December 2, 2020
Nebraska
U.S. Attorney for the District of Nebraska	Joseph P. Kelly	February 23, 2018	February 28, 2021
Nevada
U.S. Attorney for the District of Nevada	Nicholas A. Trutanich	January 16, 2019	February 28, 2021
New Hampshire
U.S. Attorney for the District of New Hampshire	Scott W. Murray	March 5, 2018	March 6, 2021
New Jersey
New Mexico
U.S. Attorney for the District of New Mexico	John C. Anderson	February 23, 2018	January 2, 2021
U.S. Attorney for the District of New Mexico	Fred Joseph Federici III	January 3, 2021 (Acting)	May 24, 2022
New York
U.S. Attorney for the S.D. of New York	Geoffrey Berman	January 5, 2018	June 20, 2020
U.S. Attorney for the S.D. of New York	Audrey Strauss	June 20, 2020	October 10, 2021
North Carolina
U.S. Attorney for the E.D. of North Carolina	Robert Higdon Jr.	October 10, 2017	February 28, 2021
U.S. Attorney for the M.D. of North Carolina	Matthew Martin	November 9, 2017	February 28, 2021
U.S. Attorney for the W.D. of North Carolina	R. Andrew Murray	November 27, 2017	February 28, 2021
North Dakota
U.S. Attorney for the District of North Dakota	Drew Wrigley	April 17, 2019	February 28, 2021
Ohio
U.S. Attorney for the N.D. of Ohio	Justin Herdman	August 21, 2017	January 8, 2021
U.S. Attorney for the S.D. Ohio	David M. DeVillers	October 28, 2019	February 28, 2021
Oklahoma
U.S. Attorney for the E.D. of Oklahoma	Brian Kuester	September 25, 2017	February 28, 2021
U.S. Attorney for the N.D. of Oklahoma	R. Trent Shores	September 21, 2017	February 28, 2021
U.S. Attorney for the W.D. of Oklahoma	Timothy J. Downing	June 5, 2019	February 28, 2021
Oregon
U.S. Attorney for the District of Oregon	Billy J. Williams	December 18, 2015 (Confirmed to a four-year term on March 7, 2018)	February 28, 2021
Pennsylvania
U.S. Attorney for the M.D. of Pennsylvania	David Freed	November 27, 2017	January 1, 2021
U.S. Attorney for the W.D. of Pennsylvania	Scott Brady	December 22, 2017	February 28, 2021
U.S. Attorney for the E.D. of Pennsylvania	William M. McSwain	April 6, 2018	January 22, 2021
Puerto Rico
U.S. Attorney for the District of Puerto Rico	W. Stephen Muldrow	October 4, 2019 (Confirmed September 26, 2019, voice vote)	July 7, 2026
Rhode Island
U.S. Attorney for the District of Rhode Island	Aaron L. Weisman	January 14, 2019	February 28, 2021
South Carolina
U.S. Attorney for the District of South Carolina	Sherri Lydon	March 24, 2018	December 10, 2019
U.S. Attorney for the District of South Carolina	Peter M. McCoy Jr.	March 30, 2020 (Interim) (Confirmed to a four-year term on June 18, 2020)	February 28, 2021
South Dakota
U.S. Attorney for the District of South Dakota	Ron A. Parsons Jr.	January 5, 2018	February 26, 2021
Tennessee
U.S. Attorney for the E.D. of Tennessee	Doug Overbey	November 21, 2017	February 28, 2021
U.S. Attorney for the M.D. of Tennessee	Donald Q. Cochran	September 21, 2017	February 28, 2021
U.S. Attorney for the W.D. of Tennessee	D. Michael Dunavant	September 21, 2017	February 28, 2021
Texas
U.S. Attorney for the E.D. of Texas	Joseph D. Brown	February 26, 2018	May 31, 2020
U.S. Attorney for the E.D. of Texas	Stephen J. Cox	May 31, 2020	January 20, 2021
U.S. Attorney for the N.D. of Texas	Erin Nealy Cox	November 17, 2017	January 8, 2021
U.S. Attorney for the S.D. of Texas	Ryan Patrick	January 8, 2018	February 28, 2021
U.S. Attorney for the W.D. of Texas	John Bash	December 11, 2017	October 9, 2020
U.S. Attorney for the W.D. of Texas	Gregg N. Sofer	October 10, 2020	February 8, 2021
Utah
U.S. Attorney for the District of Utah	John W. Huber	June 15, 2015 (Confirmed to an additional four-year term on August 3, 2017)	February 28, 2021
Vermont
U.S. Attorney for the District of Vermont	Christina E. Nolan	November 27, 2017	February 28, 2021
Virgin Islands
Virginia
U.S. Attorney for the E.D. of Virginia	G. Zachary Terwilliger	May 25, 2018 (Interim) (Confirmed to a four-year term on August 28, 2018)	January 15, 2021
U.S. Attorney for the W.D. of Virginia	Thomas T. Cullen	March 30, 2018	September 15, 2020
U.S. Attorney for the W.D. of Virginia	Daniel P. Bubar	September 15, 2020	October 7, 2021
Washington
U.S. Attorney for the E.D. of Washington	William D. Hyslop	July 18, 2019	February 28, 2021
U.S. Attorney for the W.D. of Washington	Brian T. Moran	January 17, 2019	February 28, 2021
West Virginia
U.S. Attorney for the N.D. of West Virginia	William Powell	October 13, 2017	February 28, 2021
U.S. Attorney for the S.D. of West Virginia	Michael B. Stuart	January 9, 2018	February 28, 2021
Wisconsin
U.S. Attorney for the E.D. of Wisconsin	Matthew Krueger	February 23, 2018	February 20, 2021
U.S. Attorney for the W.D. of Wisconsin	Scott Blader	November 22, 2017	February 28, 2021
Wyoming
U.S. Attorney for the District of Wyoming	Mark Klaassen	November 21, 2017	January 31, 2021

=== Second term ===
Denotes U.S. Attorneys confirmed by the Senate.
Denotes U.S. Attorney nominees awaiting Senate confirmation.
Denotes U.S. Attorneys appointed by the President or Attorney General to serve in an interim capacity, then re-appointed by the federal district court after or during the 120-day interim appointment.
Denotes U.S. Attorneys appointed directly by the federal district court, without a prior appointment by the President of Attorney General.
Denotes U.S. Attorneys appointed by the President or Attorney General to serve in an interim capacity for 120 days.
Denotes U.S. Attorneys appointed by the President or Attorney General to serve in an interim capacity for 120 days, then installed in an acting capacity (or performing the duties of U.S. Attorney) after the federal district court declined to re-appoint them.
Denotes Assistant U.S. Attorneys serving as U.S. Attorney in an acting capacity by operation of law or as de facto head of their respective U.S. Attorney's office.
Denotes U.S. Attorneys who have left office after confirmation.

District	Attorney	Assumed office	Left office
Alabama
U.S. Attorney for the M.D. of Alabama	Thomas Govan Jr.	May 29, 2026 (Confirmed* May 18, 2026, 46–43); *En bloc confirmation of 49 nominees.	
U.S. Attorney for the N.D. of Alabama	Philip Williams Jr.	May 28, 2026 (Confirmed* May 18, 2026, 46–43); *En bloc confirmation of 49 nominees.	
U.S. Attorney for the N.D. of Alabama	Catherine L. Crosby	February 20, 2026	May 28, 2026
U.S. Attorney for the N.D. of Alabama	Prim F. Escalona	July 16, 2020*; *Appointed by the first Trump Administration.	February 20, 2026
U.S. Attorney for the S.D. of Alabama	Sean P. Costello	August 14, 2026 (Confirmed* August 7, 2026, 51–47); *En bloc confirmation of 74 nominees.	
U.S. Attorney for the S.D. of Alabama	Sean P. Costello	February 27, 2021	August 14, 2026
Alaska
U.S. Attorney for the District of Alaska	Michael J. Heyman	March 3, 2025	
Arizona
U.S. Attorney for the District of Arizona	Timothy Courchaine	February 28, 2025	
U.S. Attorney for the District of Arizona	Rachel C. Hernandez	February 17, 2025	February 28, 2025
Arkansas
U.S. Attorney for the E.D. of Arkansas			
U.S. Attorney for the W.D. of Arkansas	Kevin Holmes	May 22, 2026 (Confirmed* May 18, 2026, 46–43); *En bloc confirmation of 49 nominees.	
California
U.S. Attorney for the C.D. of California	Bill Essayli	April 2, 2025	
U.S. Attorney for the E.D. of California	Eric Grant	August 11, 2025	
U.S. Attorney for the E.D. of California	Kimberly Sanchez	July 15, 2025	August 11, 2025
U.S. Attorney for the N.D. of California	Craig H. Missakian	May 27, 2025	
U.S. Attorney for the N.D. of California	Patrick Robbins	February 12, 2025	May 27, 2025
U.S. Attorney for the S.D. of California	Adam Gordon	April 11, 2025	
U.S. Attorney for the S.D. of California	Andrew R. Haden	February 12, 2025	April 11, 2025
Colorado
U.S. Attorney for the District of Colorado	Peter McNeilly	June 16, 2025	
U.S. Attorney for the District of Colorado	J. Bishop Grewell	January 25, 2025	June 16, 2025
Connecticut
U.S. Attorney for the District of Connecticut	David X. Sullivan	May 12, 2025	
Delaware
U.S. Attorney for the District of Delaware	Benjamin L. Wallace	December 12, 2025	
U.S. Attorney for the District of Delaware	Julianne Murray	July 14, 2025	December 12, 2025
U.S. Attorney for the District of Delaware	Dylan J. Steinberg	June 2025	July 14, 2025
U.S. Attorney for the District of Delaware	Shannon T. Hanson	January 21, 2025	June 2025
District of Columbia
U.S. Attorney for the District of Columbia	Jeanine Pirro	August 2, 2025 (Confirmed August 2, 2025, 50-45)	
U.S. Attorney for the District of Columbia	Jeanine Pirro	May 14, 2025	August 2, 2025
U.S. Attorney for the District of Columbia	Ed Martin	Nomination withdrawn by the President on June 16, 2025	
U.S. Attorney for the District of Columbia	Ed Martin	January 20, 2025	May 14, 2025
Florida
U.S. Attorney for the M.D. of Florida	Gregory W. Kehoe	March 31, 2025	
U.S. Attorney for the M.D. of Florida	Sara C. Sweeney	February 18, 2025	March 31, 2025
U.S. Attorney for the N.D. of Florida	John Heekin	October 7, 2025 (Confirmed* October 7, 2025, 51–47); *En bloc confirmation of 107 nominees.	
U.S. Attorney for the N.D. of Florida	John Heekin	June 2, 2025	October 7, 2025
U.S. Attorney for the N.D. of Florida	Michelle Spaven	February 18, 2025	June 2, 2025
U.S. Attorney for the S.D. of Florida	Yara Klukas	November 6, 2026	
U.S. Attorney for the S.D. of Florida	Jason Reding Quiñones	August 13, 2025 (Confirmed August 2, 2025, 52–44)	November 6, 2026
U.S. Attorney for the S.D. of Florida	Hayden O'Byrne	January 28, 2025	August 13, 2025
Georgia
U.S. Attorney for the M.D. of Georgia	William R. Keyes	June 24, 2025	
U.S. Attorney for the N.D. of Georgia	Theodore S. Hertzberg	May 13, 2025	
U.S. Attorney for the S.D. of Georgia	Meg Heap	August 18, 2025	
Guam and the Northern Mariana Islands
U.S. Attorney for the Districts of Guam and the Northern Mariana Islands	Gretchen Shappert	Awaiting Senate Confirmation	
Hawaii
U.S. Attorney for the District of Hawaii	Ken Sorenson	August 18, 2026 (Confirmed* August 7, 2026, 51–47); *En bloc confirmation of 74 nominees.	
U.S. Attorney for the District of Hawaii	Ken Sorenson	November 17, 2025	August 18, 2026
U.S. Attorney for the District of Hawaii	Ken Sorenson	January 20, 2025	November 17, 2025
Idaho
U.S. Attorney for the District of Idaho	John Shirts	October 18, 2026	
U.S. Attorney for the District of Idaho	Bart Davis	October 10, 2025 (Confirmed* October 7, 2025, 51–47); *En bloc confirmation of 107 nominees.	October 17, 2026
U.S. Attorney for the District of Idaho	Justin D. Whatcott	February 14, 2025	October 10, 2025
Illinois
U.S. Attorney for the C.D. of Illinois	Gregory Gilmore	June 1, 2026 (Confirmed* May 18, 2026, 46–43); *En bloc confirmation of 49 nominees.	
U.S. Attorney for the C.D. of Illinois	Gregory Gilmore	January 2, 2025	June 1, 2026
U.S. Attorney for the N.D. of Illinois	Andrew S. Boutros	April 7, 2025	
U.S. Attorney for the S.D. of Illinois	Steven D. Weinhoeft		
U.S. Attorney for the S.D. of Illinois	Steven D. Weinhoeft	Awaiting Senate Confirmation	
U.S. Attorney for the S.D. of Illinois	Steven D. Weinhoeft	February 28, 2025	
U.S. Attorney for the S.D. of Illinois	Ali M. Summers	February 18, 2025	February 28, 2025
Indiana
U.S. Attorney for the N.D. of Indiana	Adam Mildred	January 5, 2026 (Confirmed* December 18, 2025, 53–43); *En bloc confirmation of 97 nominees.	
U.S. Attorney for the N.D. of Indiana	Scott Proctor	July 11, 2025	January 5, 2026
U.S. Attorney for the S.D. of Indiana	Thomas Wheeler II	December 18, 2025 (Confirmed* December 18, 2025, 53–43); *En bloc confirmation of 97 nominees.	
U.S. Attorney for the S.D. of Indiana	Thomas Wheeler II	July 14, 2025	December 18, 2025
Iowa
U.S. Attorney for the N.D. of Iowa	Leif Olson	October 20, 2025 (Confirmed* October 7, 2025, 51–47); *En bloc confirmation of 107 nominees.	
U.S. Attorney for the S.D. of Iowa	David Waterman	October 15, 2025 (Confirmed* October 7, 2025, 51–47); *En bloc confirmation of 107 nominees.	
Kansas
U.S. Attorney for the District of Kansas	Ryan Kriegshauser	December 18, 2025 (Confirmed* December 18, 2025, 53–43); *En bloc confirmation of 97 nominees.	
U.S. Attorney for the District of Kansas	Ryan Kriegshauser	July 31, 2025	December 18, 2025
U.S. Attorney for the District of Kansas	Duston J. Slinkard	January 23, 2025	July 31, 2025
Kentucky
U.S. Attorney for the E.D. of Kentucky	Jason Parman	August 25, 2026	
U.S. Attorney for the E.D. of Kentucky	Paul McCaffrey	February 26, 2025	August 25, 2026
U.S. Attorney for the W.D. of Kentucky	Kyle G. Bumgarner	June 2, 2025	
Louisiana
U.S. Attorney for the E.D. of Louisiana	David Courcelle	December 29, 2025 (Confirmed* December 18, 2025, 53–43); *En bloc confirmation of 97 nominees.	
U.S. Attorney for the E.D. of Louisiana	Michael M. Simpson	February 12, 2025	December 29, 2025
U.S. Attorney for the M.D. of Louisiana	Kurt Wall	October 14, 2025 (Confirmed* October 7, 2025, 51–47); *En bloc confirmation of 107 nominees.	
U.S. Attorney for the M.D. of Louisiana	Ellison C. Travis	June 2, 2025	October 14, 2025
U.S. Attorney for the M.D. of Louisiana	April M. Leon	February 19, 2025	June 2, 2025
U.S. Attorney for the W.D. of Louisiana	Zachary Keller	May 18, 2026 (Confirmed* May 18, 2026, 46–43); *En bloc confirmation of 49 nominees.	
U.S. Attorney for the W.D. of Louisiana	Zachary Keller	September 29, 2025	May 18, 2026
U.S. Attorney for the W.D. of Louisiana	Alexander Van Hook	January 20, 2025	September 29, 2025
Maine
U.S. Attorney for the District of Maine	Andrew Benson	May 18, 2026 (Confirmed* May 18, 2026, 46–43); *En bloc confirmation of 49 nominees.	
U.S. Attorney for the District of Maine	Andrew Benson	October 22, 2025	May 18, 2026
U.S. Attorney for the District of Maine	Craig M. Wolff	February 17, 2025	October 22, 2025
Maryland
U.S. Attorney for the District of Maryland	Kelly O. Hayes	March 3, 2025	
U.S. Attorney for the District of Maryland	Phil Selden	February 12, 2025	March 3, 2025
Massachusetts
U.S. Attorney for the District of Massachusetts	Leah Foley	January 20, 2025	
Michigan
U.S. Attorney for the E.D. of Michigan	Jerome Francis Gorgon Jr.	December 18, 2025 (Confirmed* December 18, 2025, 53–43); *En bloc confirmation of 97 nominees.	
U.S. Attorney for the E.D. of Michigan	Jerome Francis Gorgon Jr.	May 2, 2025	December 18, 2025
U.S. Attorney for the E.D. of Michigan	Julie A. Beck	January 20, 2025	May 2, 2025
U.S. Attorney for the W.D. of Michigan	Timothy VerHey	August 7, 2026 (Confirmed* August 7, 2026, 51–47); *En bloc confirmation of 74 nominees.	
U.S. Attorney for the W.D. of Michigan	Timothy VerHey	July 21, 2025	August 7, 2026
U.S. Attorney for the W.D. of Michigan	Alexis M. Sanford	June 2025	July 21, 2025
U.S. Attorney for the W.D. of Michigan	Andrew Byerly Birge	January 20, 2025	June 2025
Minnesota
U. S. Attorney for the District of Minnesota	Daniel N. Rosen	October 10, 2025 (Confirmed* October 7, 2025, 51–47); *En bloc confirmation of 107 nominees.	
U. S. Attorney for the District of Minnesota	Joseph H. Thompson	June 2, 2025	October 10, 2025
Mississippi
U.S. Attorney for the N.D. of Mississippi	Scott Leary	December 18, 2025 (Confirmed* December 18, 2025, 53–43); *En bloc confirmation of 97 nominees.	
U.S. Attorney for the N.D. of Mississippi	Scott Leary	November 17, 2025	December 18, 2025
U.S. Attorney for the S.D. of Mississippi	James "Baxter" Kruger	December 18, 2025 (Confirmed* December 18, 2025, 53–43); *En bloc confirmation of 97 nominees.	
U.S. Attorney for the S.D. of Mississippi	James "Baxter" Kruger	November 17, 2025	December 18, 2025
Missouri
U.S. Attorney for the E.D. of Missouri	Thomas Albus	December 18, 2025 (Confirmed* December 18, 2025, 53–43); *En bloc confirmation of 97 nominees.	
U.S. Attorney for the E.D. of Missouri	Thomas Albus	August 1, 2025	December 18, 2025
U.S. Attorney for the E.D. of Missouri	Matthew Drake	June 3, 2025	August 1, 2025
U.S. Attorney for the W.D. of Missouri	R. Matthew Price	May 28, 2026 (Confirmed* May 18, 2026, 46–43); *En bloc confirmation of 49 nominees.	
U.S. Attorney for the W.D. of Missouri	R. Matthew Price	August 1, 2025	May 28, 2026
U.S. Attorney for the W.D. of Missouri	Jeffrey P. Ray	February 13, 2025	August 1, 2025
Montana
U.S. Attorney for the District of Montana	Scott Twito	October 30, 2026	
U.S. Attorney for the District of Montana	Mark Stegar Smith	June 1, 2026	September 2026
U.S. Attorney for the District of Montana	Timothy J. Racicot	March 4, 2026	June 1, 2026
U.S. Attorney for the District of Montana	Kurt G. Alme	October 7, 2025 (Confirmed* October 7, 2025, 51–47); *En bloc confirmation of 107 nominees.	March 4, 2026
U.S. Attorney for the District of Montana	Kurt G. Alme	March 17, 2025	October 7, 2025
U.S. Attorney for the District of Montana	Timothy J. Racicot	February 18, 2025	March 17, 2025
Nebraska
U.S. Attorney for the District of Nebraska	Lesley Woods Murphy	October 7, 2025 (Confirmed* October 7, 2025, 51–47); *En bloc confirmation of 107 nominees.	
U.S. Attorney for the District of Nebraska	Lesley Woods Murphy	May 6, 2025	October 7, 2025
U.S. Attorney for the District of Nebraska	Matthew R. Molsen	February 14, 2025	May 6, 2025
Nevada
U.S. Attorney for the District of Nevada	George Kelesis	Awaiting Senate Confirmation	
U.S. Attorney for the District of Nevada	Sigal Chattah	April 1, 2025	
U.S. Attorney for the District of Nevada	Sue Fahami	January 21, 2025	April 1, 2025
New Hampshire
U.S. Attorney for the District of New Hampshire	Erin Creegan	December 18, 2025 (Confirmed* December 18, 2025, 53–43); *En bloc confirmation of 97 nominees.	
U.S. Attorney for the District of New Hampshire	Erin Creegan	August 13, 2025	December 18, 2025
New Jersey
U.S. Attorney for the District of New Jersey	Robert Frazer	March 23, 2026	
U.S. Attorney for the District of New Jersey	Alina Habba	March 24, 2025	December 8, 2025
U.S. Attorney for the District of New Jersey	Alina Habba	Nomination withdrawn by the President on July 24, 2025	
U.S. Attorney for the District of New Jersey	John Giordano	March 3, 2025	March 24, 2025
New Mexico
U.S. Attorney for the District of New Mexico	Ryan Ellison	April 18, 2025	
U.S. Attorney for the District of New Mexico	Holland S. Kastrin	February 17, 2025	April 18, 2025
New York
U.S. Attorney for the E.D. of New York	Joseph Nocella Jr.		
U.S. Attorney for the E.D. of New York	Joseph Nocella Jr.	Awaiting Senate Confirmation	
U.S. Attorney for the E.D. of New York	Joseph Nocella Jr.	May 5, 2025	
U.S. Attorney for the E.D. of New York	John J. Durham	January 22, 2025	May 5, 2025
U.S. Attorney for the N.D. of New York	John A. Sarcone III	March 4, 2025	
U.S. Attorney for the N.D. of New York	Daniel Hanlon	February 17, 2025	March 4, 2025
U.S. Attorney for the S.D. of New York	Jamie McDonald	July 29, 2026	
U.S. Attorney for the S.D. of New York	Jay Clayton	April 16, 2025	July 29, 2026
U.S. Attorney for the S.D. of New York	Matthew Podolsky	February 13, 2025	April 16, 2025
U.S. Attorney for the S.D. of New York	Danielle Sassoon	January 21, 2025	February 13, 2025
U.S. Attorney for the W.D. of New York	Michael DiGiacomo	February 28, 2025	
U.S. Attorney for the W.D. of New York	Joel L. Violanti	February 17, 2025	February 28, 2025
North Carolina
U.S. Attorney for the E.D. of North Carolina	William Ellis Boyle	May 18, 2026 (Confirmed* May 18, 2026, 46–43); *En bloc confirmation of 49 nominees.	
U.S. Attorney for the E.D. of North Carolina	William Ellis Boyle	August 7, 2025	May 18, 2026
U.S. Attorney for the E.D. of North Carolina	Daniel P. Bubar	February 3, 2025	August 7, 2025
U.S. Attorney for the M.D. of North Carolina	Dan Bishop	May 18, 2026 (Confirmed* May 18, 2026, 46–43); *En bloc confirmation of 49 nominees.	
U.S. Attorney for the M.D. of North Carolina	Dan Bishop	November 12, 2025	May 18, 2026
U.S. Attorney for the M.D. of North Carolina	Cliff Barrett	July 21, 2025	November 12, 2025
U.S. Attorney for the W.D. of North Carolina	Russ Ferguson	December 23, 2025 (Confirmed* December 18, 2025, 53–43); *En bloc confirmation of 97 nominees.	
U.S. Attorney for the W.D. of North Carolina	Russ Ferguson	March 11, 2025	December 23, 2025
North Dakota
U.S. Attorney for the District of North Dakota	Nicholas W. Chase	October 10, 2025 (Confirmed* October 7, 2025, 51–47); *En bloc confirmation of 107 nominees.	
U.S. Attorney for the District of North Dakota	Jennifer Puhl	February 20, 2025	October 10, 2025
Ohio
U.S. Attorney for the N.D. of Ohio	David M. Toepfer	October 7, 2025 (Confirmed* October 7, 2025, 51–47); *En bloc confirmation of 107 nominees.	
U.S. Attorney for the N.D. of Ohio	David M. Toepfer	July 23, 2025	October 7, 2025
U.S. Attorney for the S.D. of Ohio	Dominick Gerace II	December 29, 2025 (Confirmed* December 18, 2025, 53–43); *En bloc confirmation of 97 nominees.	
U.S. Attorney for the S.D. of Ohio	Dominick Gerace II	August 11, 2025	December 29, 2025
U.S. Attorney for the S.D. of Ohio	Kelly A. Norris	February 18, 2025	August 11, 2025
Oklahoma
U.S. Attorney for the E.D. of Oklahoma	Joy Lynne Pittman Thorp	Awaiting Senate Confirmation	
U.S. Attorney for the N.D. of Oklahoma	Christopher Nassar	August 14, 2026 (Confirmed* August 7, 2026, 51–47); *En bloc confirmation of 74 nominees.	
U.S. Attorney for the W.D. of Oklahoma	Robert J. Troester		
U.S. Attorney for the W.D. of Oklahoma	Robert J. Troester	Awaiting Senate Confirmation	
U.S. Attorney for the W.D. of Oklahoma	Robert J. Troester	March 1, 2021*; *Appointed by the Biden Administration.	
Oregon
U.S. Attorney for the District of Oregon	Scott E. Bradford	July 29, 2025	
U.S. Attorney for the District of Oregon	William Narus	February 19, 2025	July 29, 2025
Pennsylvania
U.S. Attorney for the E.D. of Pennsylvania	David Metcalf	October 7, 2025 (Confirmed* October 7, 2025, 51–47); *En bloc confirmation of 107 nominees.	
U.S. Attorney for the E.D. of Pennsylvania	David Metcalf	March 12, 2025	October 7, 2025
U.S. Attorney for the E.D. of Pennsylvania	Nelson Thayer	February 17, 2025	March 12, 2025
U.S. Attorney for the M.D. of Pennsylvania	Brian D. Miller	May 18, 2026 (Confirmed* May 18, 2026, 46–43); *En bloc confirmation of 49 nominees.	
U.S. Attorney for the M.D. of Pennsylvania	Brian D. Miller	October 27, 2025	May 18, 2026
U.S. Attorney for the M.D. of Pennsylvania	John C. Gurganus	January 20, 2025	October 27, 2025
U.S. Attorney for the W.D. of Pennsylvania
U.S. Attorney for the W.D. of Pennsylvania	Daniel Johnson	Awaiting Senate Confirmation	
U.S. Attorney for the W.D. of Pennsylvania	Troy Rivetti	January 28, 2026	
U.S. Attorney for the W.D. of Pennsylvania	Troy Rivetti	January 20, 2025	January 28, 2026
Puerto Rico
U.S. Attorney for the District of Puerto Rico	Héctor E. Ramírez-Carbó	July 7, 2026	
U.S. Attorney for the District of Puerto Rico	W. Stephen Muldrow	October 4, 2019* (Confirmed September 26, 2019, voice vote); *Confirmed during the first Trump Administration.	July 7, 2026
Rhode Island
U.S. Attorney for the District of Rhode Island	Charles Calenda	December 30, 2025	
U.S. Attorney for the District of Rhode Island	Sara M. Bloom	February 18, 2025	December 30, 2025
South Carolina
U.S. Attorney for the District of South Carolina	Bryan Stirling	December 18, 2025 (Confirmed* December 18, 2025, 53–43); *En bloc confirmation of 97 nominees.	
U.S. Attorney for the District of South Carolina	Bryan Stirling	April 28, 2025	December 18, 2025
U.S. Attorney for the District of South Carolina	Brook Andrews	February 18, 2025	April 28, 2025
South Dakota
U.S. Attorney for the District of South Dakota	Ron A. Parsons Jr.	October 14, 2025 (Confirmed* October 7, 2025, 51–47); *En bloc confirmation of 107 nominees.	
Tennessee
U.S. Attorney for the E.D. of Tennessee	Samuel King Lee	Awaiting Senate Confirmation	
U.S. Attorney for the M.D. of Tennessee	Braden Boucek	December 24, 2025 (Confirmed* December 18, 2025, 53–43); *En bloc confirmation of 97 nominees.	
U.S. Attorney for the W.D. of Tennessee	D. Michael Dunavant	October 10, 2025 (Confirmed* October 7, 2025, 51–47); *En bloc confirmation of 107 nominees.	
U.S. Attorney for the W.D. of Tennessee	Joseph C. Murphy Jr.	March 28, 2025	October 10, 2025
Texas
U.S. Attorney for the N.D. of Texas	Ryan Raybould	May 18, 2026 (Confirmed* May 18, 2026, 46–43); *En bloc confirmation of 49 nominees.	
U.S. Attorney for the N.D. of Texas	Ryan Raybould	November 17, 2025	May 18, 2026
U.S. Attorney for the N.D. of Texas	Nancy E. Larson	May 29, 2025	November 17, 2025
U.S. Attorney for the N.D. of Texas	Chad Meacham	January 20, 2025	May 29, 2025
U.S. Attorney for the E.D. of Texas	Jay R. Combs	May 29, 2025	
U.S. Attorney for the W.D. of Texas	Justin R. Simmons	May 30, 2025	
U.S. Attorney for the S.D. of Texas	Aaron Reitz	July 9, 2026	
U.S. Attorney for the S.D. of Texas	John Marck	March 11, 2026	July 9, 2026
U.S. Attorney for the S.D. of Texas	Nicholas Ganjei	January 29, 2025	March 10, 2026
U.S. Attorney for the S.D. of Texas	Jennifer B. Lowery	January 20, 2025	January 29, 2025
Utah
U.S. Attorney for the District of Utah	Melissa Holyoak	May 28, 2026 (Confirmed* May 18, 2026, 46–43); *En bloc confirmation of 49 nominees.	
U.S. Attorney for the District of Utah	Melissa Holyoak	November 17, 2025	May 28, 2026
U.S. Attorney for the District of Utah	Felice John Viti	February 17, 2025	November 17, 2025
Vermont
U.S. Attorney for the District of Vermont	Jonathan Ophardt	January 9, 2026	
U.S. Attorney for the District of Vermont	Michael P. Drescher	January 20, 2025	January 9, 2026
Virgin Islands
U.S. Attorney for the District of the Virgin Islands	Adam Sleeper	October 7, 2025 (Confirmed* October 7, 2025, 51–47); *En bloc confirmation of 107 nominees.	
U.S. Attorney for the District of the Virgin Islands	Adam Sleeper	April 14, 2025	October 7, 2025
Virginia
U.S. Attorney for the E.D. of Virginia
U.S. Attorney for the E.D. of Virginia	Theophani K. Stamos	July 16, 2026	
U.S. Attorney for the E.D. of Virginia	Frank Bradsher	January 20, 2026	July 16, 2026
U.S. Attorney for the E.D. of Virginia	Lindsey Halligan	Awaiting Senate Confirmation	
U.S. Attorney for the E.D. of Virginia	Lindsey Halligan	September 22, 2025	January 20, 2026
U.S. Attorney for the E.D. of Virginia	Maggie Cleary	September 20, 2025	September 22, 2025
U.S. Attorney for the E.D. of Virginia	Erik S. Siebert	Nomination withdrawn by the President on September 29, 2025	
U.S. Attorney for the E.D. of Virginia	Erik S. Siebert	January 20, 2025	September 19, 2025
U.S. Attorney for the W.D. of Virginia	Robert N. Tracci	August 20, 2025	
U.S. Attorney for the W.D. of Virginia	Todd Gilbert	Nomination withdrawn by the President on September 3, 2025	
U.S. Attorney for the W.D. of Virginia	Todd Gilbert	July 14, 2025	August 20, 2025
Washington
U.S. Attorney for the E.D. of Washington	Peter Serrano		
U.S. Attorney for the E.D. of Washington	Peter Serrano	Awaiting Senate Confirmation	
U.S. Attorney for the E.D. of Washington	Peter Serrano	August 6, 2025	
U.S. Attorney for the E.D. of Washington	Stephanie A. Van Marter	July 7, 2025	August 6, 2025
U.S. Attorney for the E.D. of Washington	Richard R. Barker	February 12, 2025	July 7, 2025
U.S. Attorney for the W.D. of Washington	Charles Neil Floyd	October 6, 2025	
U.S. Attorney for the W.D. of Washington	Teal Luthy Miller	February 13, 2025	October 6, 2025
West Virginia
U.S. Attorney for the N.D. of West Virginia	Matthew Harvey	October 10, 2025 (Confirmed* October 7, 2025, 51–47); *En bloc confirmation of 107 nominees.	
U.S. Attorney for the N.D. of West Virginia	Randolph J. Bernard	January 20, 2025	October 10, 2025
U.S. Attorney for the S.D. of West Virginia	Moore Capito	October 10, 2025 (Confirmed* October 7, 2025, 51–47); *En bloc confirmation of 107 nominees.	
U.S. Attorney for the S.D. of West Virginia	Lisa G. Johnson	March 3, 2025	October 10, 2025
Wisconsin
U.S. Attorney for the E.D. of Wisconsin	Brad Schimel	November 17, 2025	
U.S. Attorney for the E.D. of Wisconsin	Richard G. Frohling	February 20, 2025	November 17, 2025
U.S. Attorney for the W.D. of Wisconsin	Chadwick M. Elgersma	June 28, 2025	
Wyoming
U.S. Attorney for the District of Wyoming	Darin Smith	May 28, 2026 (Confirmed* May 18, 2026, 46–43); *En bloc confirmation of 49 nominees.	
U.S. Attorney for the District of Wyoming	Darin Smith	August 11, 2025	May 28, 2026
U.S. Attorney for the District of Wyoming	Stephanie I. Sprecher	February 13, 2025	August 11, 2025

== Notes ==
=== Confirmation votes ===
Confirmations by voice vote (first administration)

Confirmations by roll call vote (second administration)
