= List of first minority male lawyers and judges in Louisiana =

List of first African-American male lawyers and judges in Louisiana, U.S.

This is a list of the first minority male lawyer(s) and judge(s) in Louisiana. It includes the year in which the men were admitted to practice law (in parentheses). Also included are men who achieved other distinctions such as becoming the first in their state to graduate from law school or become a political figure.

== Firsts in state history ==
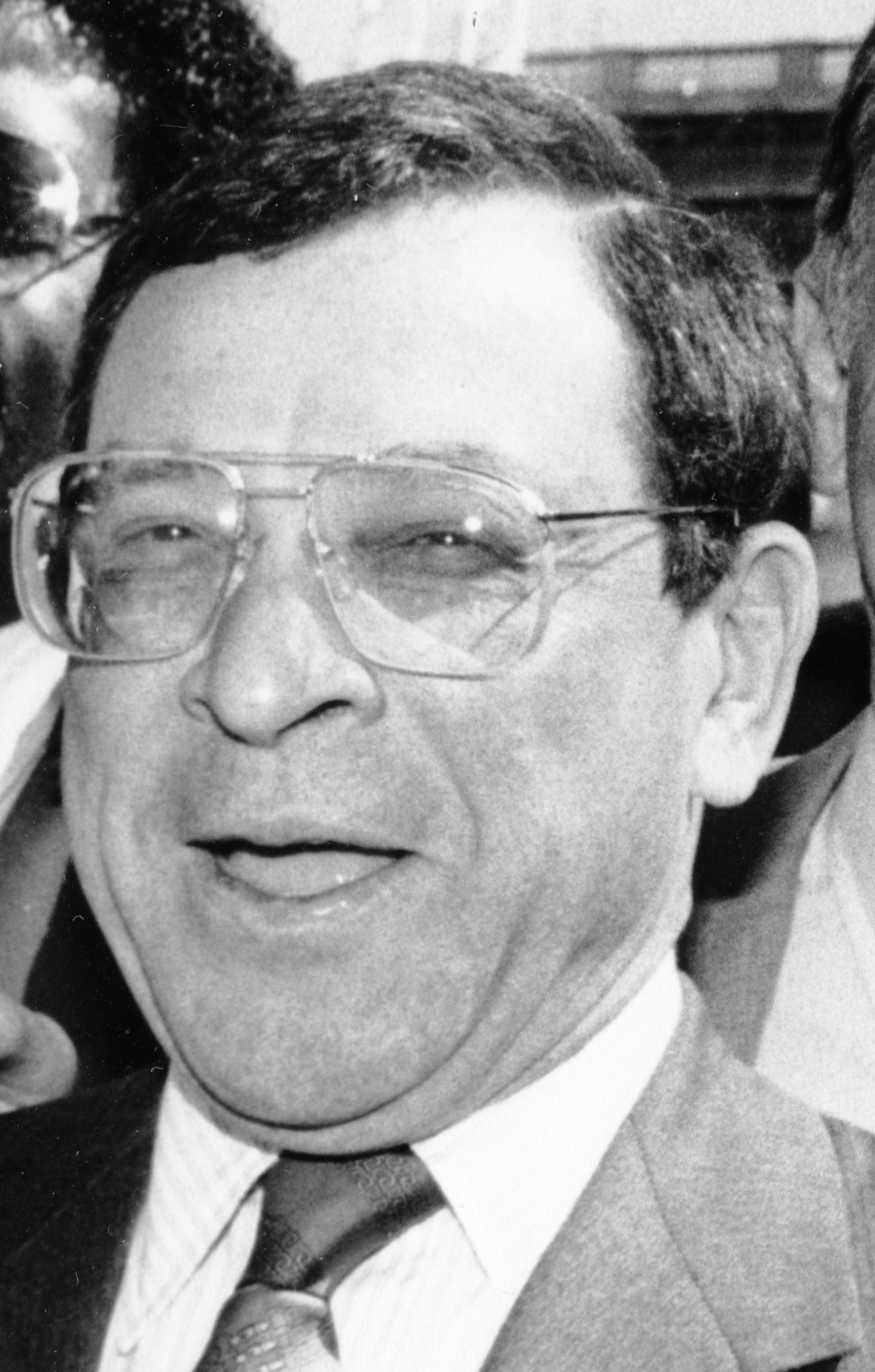
Ernest Morial: First African American male Judge of the Louisiana Fourth Circuit Court of Appeal (1970)

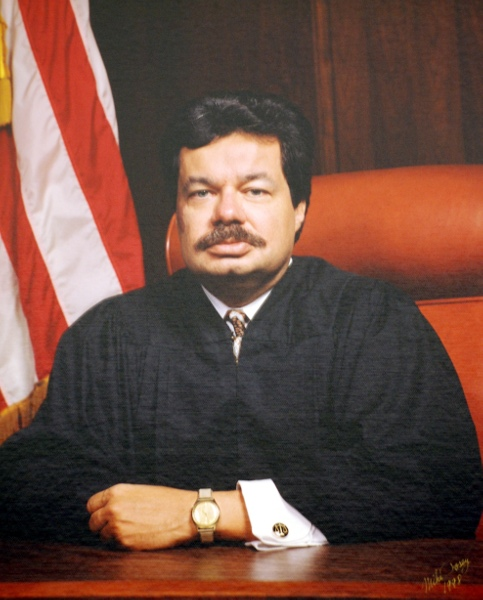
Ivan L.R. Lemelle: First African American male U.S. Magistrate of the U.S. District Court for the Eastern District of Louisiana (1984)

=== Lawyers ===
- C. Clay Morgan (1860): First African American male lawyer in Louisiana
- David A. Kattán: One of the first Latino American male lawyers in Louisiana
- Jeremy M. Bolton (2006): First deaf male lawyer in Louisiana

=== State judges ===
- Edouard Bermudez: First Creole male to serve as the Chief Justice of the Louisiana Supreme Court (1880)
- Israel M. "I.M." Augustine: First African American male judge in Louisiana (1969)
- Ernest "Dutch" Nathan Morial: First African American male to serve as a juvenile court judge in Louisiana (1970) and serve on the Louisiana Fourth Circuit Court of Appeal (1974)
- Don Johnson (1982) and Ron Johnson (1984): First set of (African American) twins to serve simultaneously as judges in Louisiana
- Freddie Pitcher (1973): First African American male appointed as a Judge of the Nineteenth Judicial District of Louisiana (1987)
- Jesse N. Stone: First African American male to serve as an (Associate Pro Tempore) Justice of the Louisiana Supreme Court (1972)
- Revius Ortique Jr.: First African American male to serve on the Louisiana Supreme Court (1992)

=== Federal judges ===
- Robert Frederick Collins: First African American male to serve as a federal court judge in Louisiana (1978)
- Ivan L.R. Lemelle (1974): First African American male to serve as the United States Magistrate of the U.S. District Court for the Eastern District of Louisiana (1984)
- Ralph E. Tyson (1973): First African American male appointed as a Judge of the U.S. District Court for the Middle District of Louisiana (1998)
- Jerry Edwards Jr.: First African American male appointed as a Judge of the U.S. District Court for the Western District of Louisiana (2023)

=== United States Attorneys ===
- Eddie Jordan, Jr.: First African American male to serve as a U.S. Attorney in Louisiana (1994)
- Donald W. Washington: First African American male to serve as the United States Attorney for the Western District of Louisiana (2001)
- Ronald C. Gathe, Jr.: First African American male to serve as the United States Attorney for the Middle District of Louisiana (2021)

=== Assistant United States Attorney ===
- Ernest "Dutch" Nathan Morial: First African American male to serve as an Assistant U.S. Attorney in Louisiana (1965)

=== District Attorney ===
- Charles Shropshire: First African American male elected as a District Attorney in Louisiana (1996)

=== Assistant District Attorney ===
- J. Edward "Eddie" Hines Jr.: First African American male to serve as an Assistant District Attorney in Louisiana (1979)

=== Bar Association ===
- Wayne J. Lee: First African American male to serve as the President of the Louisiana State Bar Association

== Firsts in local history ==
- Alvin Turner Jr.: First African American male to serve as an Assistant District Attorney and a Judge of the 23rd Judicial District [Ascension, Assumption, and St. James Parishes, Louisiana]
- Jesse N. Stone: First African American lawyer in Shreveport, Louisiana [Bossier and Caddo Parishes, Louisiana]
- John Belton: First African American male to serve as the District Attorney for the Third Judicial District in Louisiana [Lincoln and Union Parishes, Louisiana]
- James E. Stewart, Sr.: First African American male to serve as the District Attorney of Caddo Parish, Louisiana (2015)
- Ernest Nathan Morial: First African American male to graduate from Louisiana State University law school [East Baton Rouge Parish, Louisiana]
- Freddie Pitcher (1973): First African American male judge in Baton Rouge, Louisiana [East Baton Rouge Parish, Louisiana]
- Ralph E. Tyson (1973): First African American male to serve as a federal judge in Baton Rouge, Louisiana [East Baton Rouge Parish, Louisiana]
- Nathan E. Wilson: First African American male to serve as an Assistant District Attorney in East Baton Rouge Parish, Louisiana
- Charles Shropshire: First African American male elected as the District Attorney for East and West Feliciana Parishes, Louisiana (1996)
- Lionel R. Collins: First African American male judge in Jefferson Parish, Louisiana
- Melvin Zeno: First African American male to serve as the Assistant District Attorney for Jefferson Parish, Louisiana
- Miguel A. Elias: First Hispanic American male to serve as a Magistrate Judge for Kenner, Jefferson Parish, Louisiana (2004)
- Anthony Lewis: First African American male to serve as an Assistant District Attorney in Lafourche Parish, Louisiana
- Earl J. Amedee: First African American male to serve as the Assistant District Attorney of Orleans Parish, Louisiana (1958)
- Ernest Nathan Morial: First African American male (a lawyer) to serve as the mayor and a judge in New Orleans, Orleans Parish, Louisiana
- Okla Jones II (1971): First African American male to serve as the City Attorney for the City of New Orleans, Orleans Parish, Louisiana (1986). He would later become a district court judge.
- Bruce James McConduit: First African American (male) elected to a municipal court judgeship in Orleans Parish, Louisiana (1986)
- Eddie Jordan, Jr: First African American male to serve as the District Attorney of Orleans Parish, Louisiana (2003)
- Charles Jones: First African American male to serve as the Assistant District Attorney of Ouachita Parish, Louisiana
- William E. Armstrong: First African American male to serve as Monroe City Prosecutor [Ouachita Parish, Louisiana]
- Larry Jefferson: First African American male elected as a Judge of the Monroe City Court (1990) [Ouachita Parish, Louisiana]
- J. Edward "Eddie" Hines, Jr.: First African American male to serve as an Assistant District Attorney of Rapides Parish, Louisiana (1979)
- Louis Berry: First African American male lawyer in Alexandria, Louisiana
- Richard L. Millspaugh: First African American male to serve as the Opelousas City Attorney [St. Landry Parish, Louisiana]. In 1954, he was supposedly the first African American lawyer to represent a White litigant in the South.
- Juan Pickett: First African American male judge in Terrebonne Parish, Louisiana (2014)

== See also ==
- List of first minority male lawyers and judges in the United States

== Other topics of interest ==
- List of first women lawyers and judges in the United States
- List of first women lawyers and judges in Louisiana
