= Elmer Gordon West =

American judge (1914–1992)

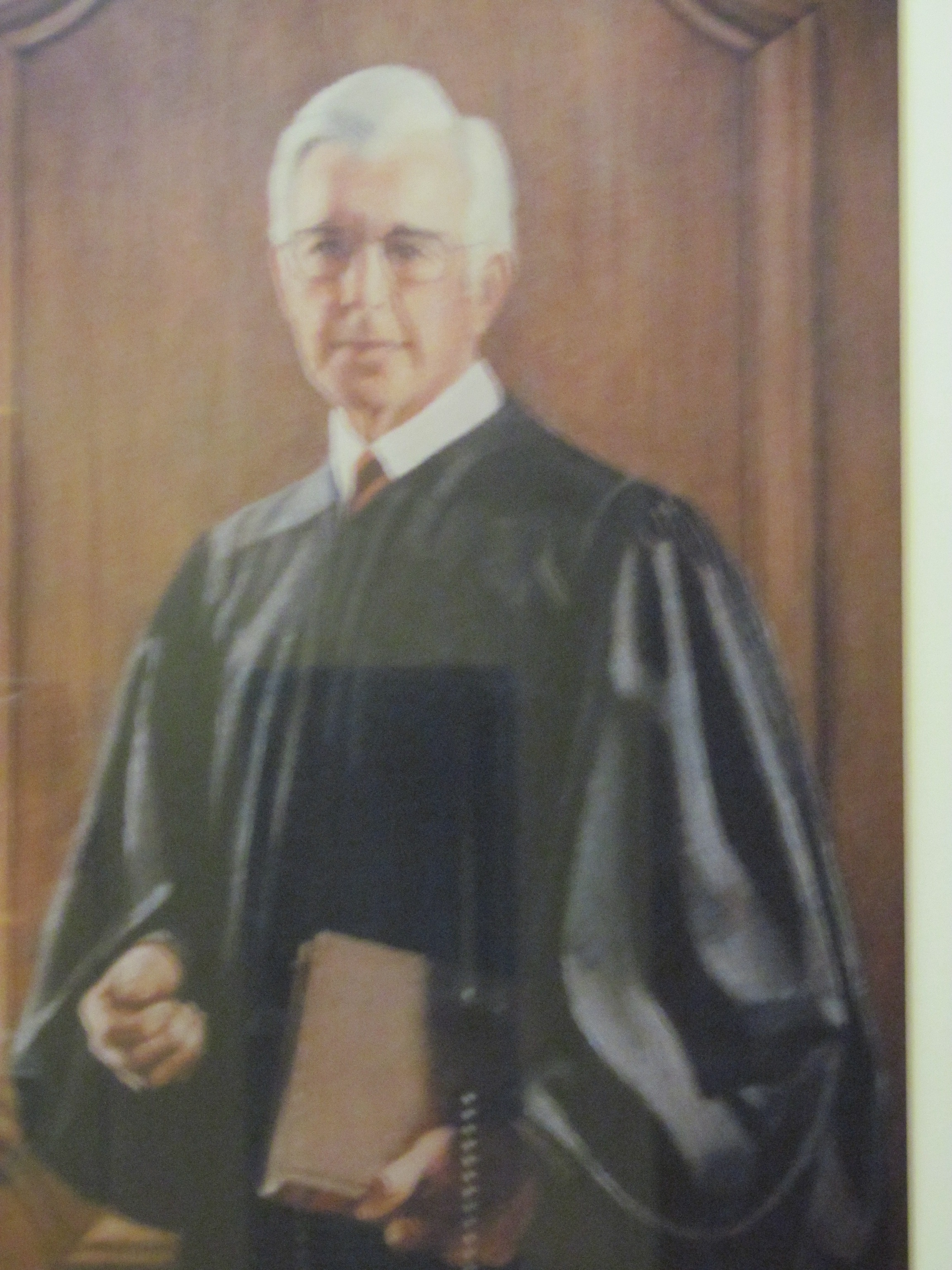

Senior Judge of the United States District Court for the Middle District of Louisiana
- In office November 27, 1979 – November 2, 1992

Chief Judge of the United States District Court for the Middle District of Louisiana
- In office 1978–1979
- Preceded by: Office established
- Succeeded by: John Victor Parker

Judge of the United States District Court for the Middle District of Louisiana
- In office April 16, 1972 – November 27, 1979
- Appointed by: operation of law
- Preceded by: Seat established by 85 Stat. 741
- Succeeded by: Frank Joseph Polozola

Chief Judge of the United States District Court for the Eastern District of Louisiana
- In office 1967–1972
- Preceded by: Herbert William Christenberry
- Succeeded by: Frederick Jacob Reagan Heebe

Judge of the United States District Court for the Eastern District of Louisiana
- In office September 15, 1961 – April 16, 1972
- Appointed by: John F. Kennedy
- Preceded by: Seat established by 75 Stat. 80
- Succeeded by: Seat abolished

Personal details
- Born: November 17, 1914 Hyde Park, Massachusetts, U.S.
- Died: November 2, 1992 (aged 77)
- Education: Louisiana State University (B.S.); Paul M. Hebert Law Center (LL.B.)

Elmer Gordon West (November 17, 1914 – November 2, 1992) was a United States district judge of the United States District Court for the Eastern District of Louisiana and the United States District Court for the Middle District of Louisiana.

== Education and career ==
Born in Hyde Park, Massachusetts, West received a Bachelor of Science degree from Louisiana State University in 1941. He received a Bachelor of Laws from the Paul M. Hebert Law Center at Louisiana State University in 1942. He was in the United States Naval Reserve from 1942 to 1945. He was an attorney for the Louisiana State Department of Revenue from 1945 to 1946. He was an inheritance tax collector for the State of Louisiana from 1948 to 1952. He was in private practice of law in Baton Rouge, Louisiana from 1946 to 1961.

=== Law partnership with Senator Long ===
In 1946, West opened the law firm of Long & West, with soon to be United States Senator Russell B. Long. At LSU, West met Long. Both men served in the Navy during World War II. According to West, "[d]uring the invasion of Sicily, my ship hit a mine. We were torn up pretty bad. We came back; the ship was half underwater. They towed us back to northern Africa. I got a message that another ship was going to have a moving picture in their hold." West went on to say, "[t]he picture had already started. When I got down to the hold of the ship my eyes got acclimated to the dark and I looked around, and two seats down was Russell Long. Well, as far as we both were concerned, that far away from home, anyone from home really looked good. And so that was the beginning of our real wonderful friendship. Russell and I became such very good friends, and when we got out we decided to go into law practice together. So, we formed the firm of Long and West in January 1946." In 1950, West became a member of the firm Kantrow & West, which ultimately became Kantrow, Spaht, West & Klienpeter, and remained in general active practice until September 5, 1961.

== Federal judicial service ==
West was nominated by President John F. Kennedy on September 5, 1961, to the United States District Court for the Eastern District of Louisiana, to a new seat created by 75 Stat. 80. He was confirmed by the United States Senate on September 14, 1961, and received his commission on September 15, 1961. He served as Chief Judge from 1967 to 1972. He was reassigned by operation of law to the United States District Court for the Middle District of Louisiana on April 16, 1972, to a new seat established by 85 Stat. 741. He was a member of the Judicial Conference of the United States from 1971 to 1974. He served as Chief Judge from 1978 to 1979. He assumed senior status on November 27, 1979. His service was terminated on November 2, 1992, due to his death. As of 2020, West is the only judge appointed by a Republican president to have served on the District Court for the Middle District of Louisiana. All direct appointments to this Court have been by Jimmy Carter, Bill Clinton or Barack Obama, making the Middle District of Louisiana the only federal court where all appointments have been by presidents of one party. (Note: Two older district courts have gone longer without an appointment by a president of one or the other party: the District of North Dakota has had no Democratic appointee since Franklin D. Roosevelt, while the Southern District of Alabama has had no Democratic appointments since Lyndon B. Johnson.)

=== Notable case ===
West was widely praised for his protection of the rights of prisoners in litigation challenging the constitutionality of conditions of confinement in the Louisiana State Penitentiary at Angola. In 1975, West ruled that Angola prison conditions "shocked the conscience" and entered an injunction designed to improve the penitentiary and decentralize the Louisiana prison system. The Fifth Circuit affirmed, remanding for determination of specific inmate population and security staffing requirements. Williams v. Edwards, 547 F.2d 1206 (5th Cir. 1977). The Angola Museum website intimates that West's order resulted eventually in quadrupling the number of security guards; major facilities renovations, including construction of four new camps; and improved rehabilitative efforts and prisoner medical care at Angola.

== Death and legacy ==
West died on November 2, 1992, aged 77. Upon his death, Senator Long stated, "The Lord never made a better man that Gordon West. He was fair, hard working and had a heart that was compassionate to all."

United States District Judge Frank Joseph Polozola remarked that West was one of the "most scholarly judges I ever met...there was no question that he had a very strong belief in the Constitution."

== Sources ==
Legal offices
Preceded by Seat established by 75 Stat. 80	Judge of the United States District Court for the Eastern District of Louisiana; 1961–1972	Succeeded by Seat abolished
Preceded by Herbert William Christenberry	Chief Judge of the United States District Court for the Eastern District of Louisiana; 1967–1972	Succeeded by Frederick Jacob Reagan Heebe
Preceded by Seat established by 85 Stat. 741	Judge of the United States District Court for the Middle District of Louisiana; 1972–1979	Succeeded by Frank Joseph Polozola
Preceded by Office established	Chief Judge of the United States District Court for the Middle District of Louisiana; 1978–1979	Succeeded by John Victor Parker
