= Patrick Robins =

Patrick Robbins may refer to:

- Paddy Robbins (1914-1986), Irish footballer
- Patrick Robbins, see List of United States attorneys appointed by Donald Trump
