= Judge Dick =

Judge Dick may refer to:

- John Dick (judge) (1788–1824), judge of the United States District Court for the District of Louisiana, and of the Eastern and Western Districts of Louisiana
- Robert P. Dick (1823–1898), judge of the United States District Court for the Western District of North Carolina
- Shelly Dick (born 1960), judge of the United States District Court for the Middle District of Louisiana
