= Frank Joseph Polozola =

American judge (1942–2013)

Senior Judge of the United States District Court for the Middle District of Louisiana
- In office January 15, 2007 – February 24, 2013

Chief Judge of the United States District Court for the Middle District of Louisiana
- In office 1998–2005
- Preceded by: John Victor Parker
- Succeeded by: Ralph E. Tyson

Judge of the United States District Court for the Middle District of Louisiana
- In office May 23, 1980 – January 15, 2007
- Appointed by: Jimmy Carter
- Preceded by: Elmer Gordon West
- Succeeded by: Brian A. Jackson

Magistrate Judge of the United States District Court for the Middle District of Louisiana
- In office 1972–1980

Personal details
- Born: Frank Joseph Polozola; January 15, 1942 Baton Rouge, Louisiana, U.S.
- Died: February 24, 2013 (aged 71) Baton Rouge, Louisiana, U.S.
- Education: Paul M. Hebert Law Center (LLB)

Frank Joseph Polozola (January 15, 1942 – February 24, 2013) was a United States district judge of the United States District Court for the Middle District of Louisiana.

== Education and career ==
Born in Baton Rouge, Louisiana, Polozola received a Bachelor of Laws in 1965 from the Paul M. Hebert Law Center at Louisiana State University. He was a law clerk for Judge Elmer Gordon West of the United States District Court for the Middle District of Louisiana from 1965 to 1966. He was in private practice in Baton Rouge from 1966 to 1973. He began teaching in 1977 at the Paul M. Hebert Law Center.

== Federal judicial service ==
Polozola was a part-time United States Magistrate of the United States District Court for the Middle District of Louisiana from 1972 to 1973, and a full-time United States Magistrate for the same court from 1973 to 1980.

On April 2, 1980, Polozola was nominated by President Jimmy Carter to the seat on the United States District Court for the Middle District of Louisiana vacated by his former mentor, Judge West. Polozola was confirmed by the U.S. Senate on May 21, 1980, and received his commission two days later. Polozola served as Chief Judge from 1998 to 2005. He assumed senior status on January 15, 2007. Polozola died on February 24, 2013, in Baton Rouge.

== Notable cases ==
In September 1980, Polozola presided over the racketeering and extortion trial of former Louisiana Commissioner of Agriculture and Forestry Gil Dozier of Baton Rouge. When Dozier was found to have engaged in jury tampering in his original trial while on bond, Polozola added eight years to the original ten-year sentence. In 1984, Dozier's term was commuted by President Reagan, over Judge Polozola's objections.

Polozola presided over the case of notorious Louisiana drug smuggler Barry Seal, who made countless runs from Central America to the United States, flying thousands of pounds of cocaine and marijuana into the country and making millions of dollars. When faced with criminal prosecution, Seal turned informant for the DEA, but he continued to smuggle drugs into the US. As part of a plea bargain after his arrest, Seal was effectively shielded from serving hard time for narcotic trafficking. On 20 December 1985, Polozola invoked the sentence handed down by a Florida judge as he was required to under the terms of Seal's deal with the government and sentenced Seal to six months' supervised probation, as permitted under federal law. A condition of the sentence was that he had to spend every night, from 6 p.m. to 6 a.m., at the Salvation Army halfway house on Airline Highway in Baton Rouge. Polozola further stipulated that Seal could not carry a gun or hire armed bodyguards as this would be possession or constructive possession of a firearm by a convicted felon - both federal felonies. Seal's attorney, Lewis Unglesby, told Polozola his ruling amounted to a death sentence for his client. However, Seal refused witness protection. Seal told friends that the judge "made me a clay pigeon." At 6 p.m. on February 19, 1986, Seal promptly drove up to the Salvation Army in his white Cadillac. As he parked his car, he was approached by a man carrying an automatic weapon. Two quick bursts riddled Seal's head and chest, killing him instantly.

In 2000, Polozola presided over the criminal trial of former Governor Edwin Edwards.

== Sources ==
Legal offices
Preceded by Elmer Gordon West	Judge of the United States District Court for the Middle District of Louisiana; 1980–2007	Succeeded by Brian A. Jackson
Preceded by John Victor Parker	Chief Judge of the United States District Court for the Middle District of Louisiana; 1998–2005	Succeeded by Ralph E. Tyson
