= Bockrath =

Bockratz is a surname. Notable people with the surname include:

- George Eugene Bockrath (1911–1998), American aeronautical engineer
- Joseph T. Bockrath, American legal scholar
