= Maynard Nexsen =

American law firm

- Headquarters: Birmingham, Alabama
- No. of offices: 25
- No. of attorneys: 550
- Key people: Jeff Grantham, CEO; Leighton Lord, President; Greg Curran, Chairman
- Date founded: 2023; Maynard Cooper & Gale, 1984; Nexsen Pruet, 1945
- Company type: Professional corporation
- Website: www.maynardnexsen.com

Maynard Nexsen PC is an American full-service law firm based in Birmingham, Alabama. The firm has more than 550 lawyers and professionals in 25 offices nationwide. The firm offers services in more than 100 practice areas, spanning corporate, regulatory and litigation work.

Maynard Nexsen was formed in 2023 through the merger of law firms Maynard Cooper & Gale and Nexsen Pruet. It is the largest law firm in Alabama by number of lawyers.

== Subsidiaries ==
- NP Strategy, a strategic communications and public relations firm
- Nextra Solutions, an e-discovery and litigation technology support company

== Notable attorneys and alumni ==
- Stephen Boyd – U.S. assistant attorney general for the Office of Legislative Affairs (2017–2021)
- William Campbell – chief judge of the U.S. District Court for the Middle District of Tennessee
- J. Michelle Childs – judge of the U.S. Court of Appeals for the District of Columbia Circuit
- Bob Coble – mayor of Columbia, South Carolina (1990–2010)
- Prim Escalona – U.S. attorney for the Northern District of Alabama
- Tanya Gee – at-large judge of the South Carolina Circuit Court
- James Holshouser – 68th governor of North Carolina
- John Johns – CEO of Protective Life Corporation (2002–2017)
- Sherri Lydon – judge of the U.S. District Court for the District of South Carolina
- Steve Marshall – 48th attorney general of Alabama
- Jay Mitchell – associate justice of the Supreme Court of Alabama
- Drayton Nabers Jr. – chief justice of the Supreme Court of Alabama (2004–2007)
- Terri Sewell – U.S. representative for Alabama's 7th Congressional District
- C. C. Torbert Jr. – chief justice of the Supreme Court of Alabama (1977–1989)
- William Wilkins – chief judge of the U.S. Court of Appeals for the Fourth Circuit (2003–2007) and chair of the U.S. Sentencing Commission (1985–1994)
