= John Victor Parker =

American judge (1928–2014)

Senior Judge of the United States District Court for the Middle District of Louisiana
- In office October 31, 1998 – July 14, 2014

Chief Judge of the United States District Court for the Middle District of Louisiana
- In office 1979–1998
- Preceded by: Elmer Gordon West
- Succeeded by: Frank Joseph Polozola

Judge of the United States District Court for the Middle District of Louisiana
- In office September 26, 1979 – October 31, 1998
- Appointed by: Jimmy Carter
- Preceded by: Seat established by 92 Stat. 1629
- Succeeded by: James Joseph Brady

Personal details
- Born: John Victor Parker; October 14, 1928 Baton Rouge, Louisiana, U.S.
- Died: July 14, 2014 (aged 85) Baton Rouge, Louisiana, U.S.
- Education: Louisiana State University (BA); Paul M. Hebert Law Center (JD)

John Victor Parker (October 14, 1928 – July 14, 2014) was a United States district judge of the United States District Court for the Middle District of Louisiana.

== Education and career ==
Born in Baton Rouge, Louisiana, Parker received a Bachelor of Arts degree from Louisiana State University in 1949 and a Juris Doctor from the Paul M. Hebert Law Center at Louisiana State University in 1952. He was in the United States Army from 1952 to 1954, remaining in the United States Army Reserve until 1964. He was in private practice in Baton Rouge from 1954 to 1979, also serving as an assistant parish attorney of the City of Baton Rouge in the Parish of East Baton Rouge, from 1956 to 1966.

== Federal judicial service ==
On May 24, 1979, Parker was nominated by President Jimmy Carter to a new seat on the United States District Court for the Middle District of Louisiana created by 92 Stat. 1629. He was confirmed by the United States Senate on September 25, 1979, and received his commission on September 26, 1979. He served as Chief Judge from 1979 to 1998, assuming senior status on October 31, 1998, serving until his death on July 14, 2014, at his home in Baton Rouge.

== Sources ==
Legal offices
Preceded by Seat established by 92 Stat. 1629	Judge of the United States District Court for the Middle District of Louisiana; 1979–1998	Succeeded by James Joseph Brady
Preceded by Elmer Gordon West	Chief Judge of the United States District Court for the Middle District of Louisiana; 1979–1998	Succeeded by Frank Joseph Polozola
