= List of first women lawyers and judges in Louisiana =

This is a list of the first women lawyer(s) and judge(s) in Louisiana. It includes the year in which the women were admitted to practice law (in parentheses). Also included are women who achieved other distinctions, such as becoming the first in their state, to graduate from law school or become a political figure.

LaLeshia Walker Alford made history as the First African American elected to Shreveport City Court bench in 1997.

== Firsts in state history ==
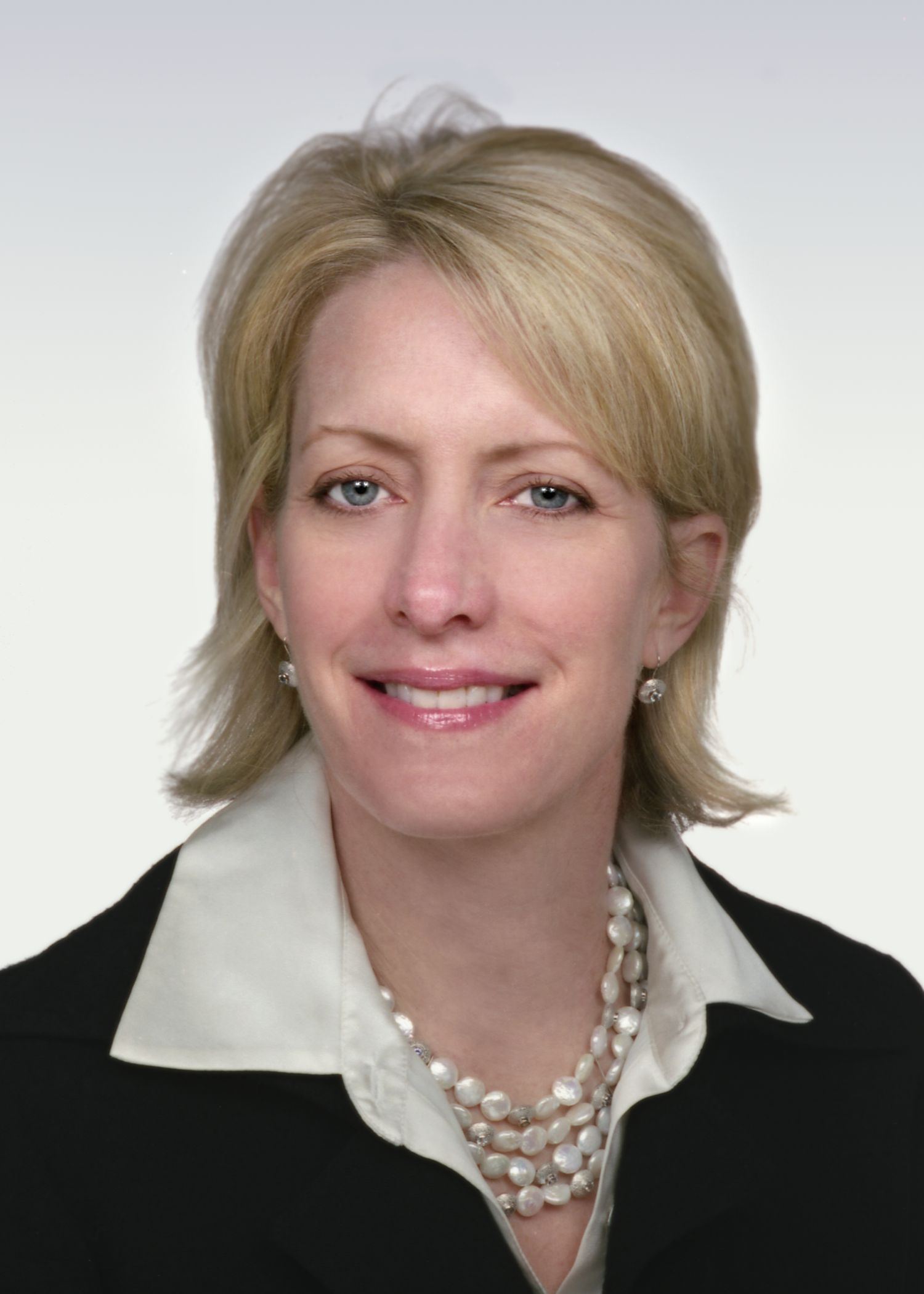
Shelly Deckert Dick: First female Judge of the U.S. District Court for the Middle District of Louisiana (2013)

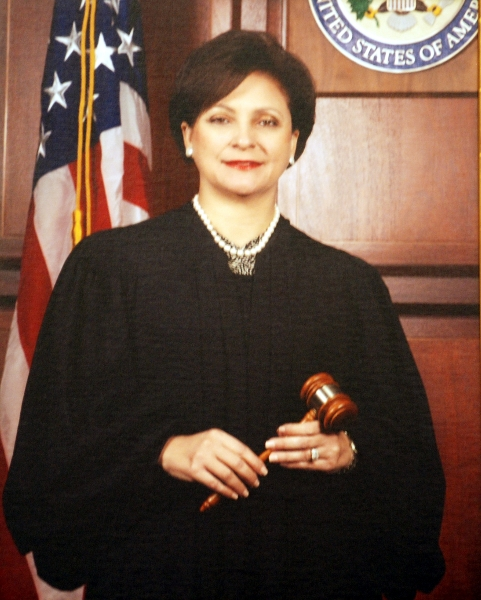
Nannette Jolivette Brown: First African American female appointed as a Judge of the U.S. District Court for the Eastern District of Louisiana (2011)

=== Lawyers ===
- Bettie Runnels and Rose Cara Falls Bres (1898): First female lawyers in Louisiana. Bres would become the first female lawyer to plead cases before the Court of Appeals and the Supreme Court of Louisiana.
- Irene J. Barrios (1922): First Latino American female lawyer in Louisiana
- Marian Berkett (1937): First female lawyer hired by a law firm in Louisiana
- Marcia McDonald Fenelon (1948) and Mary Gloria Lawson (1956): First African American female lawyers respectively in Louisiana

=== Law clerks ===
- Tammy Lee: First African American female to serve as a law clerk for the Fourth Judicial District Court (1993)
- Veronica Odinet Koclanes: First female to serve as the clerk of the court for Louisiana Supreme Court (2021)

=== State judges ===
- Anna Judge Veters Levy (c. 1922): First female judge in Louisiana (1941): Orleans Parish Juvenile Court.
- Fannie Burch (1934): first woman elected district court judge in Louisiana--21st District Court.
- Joan Armstrong (1967): First African American female judge in Louisiana (1974) and first to serve on the Louisiana Court of Appeals (1984)
- Catherine D. Kimball (1970): First female elected to the Eighteenth Judicial District Court (1983) and serve on the Supreme Court of Louisiana (1992)
- Rae Swent: First female to serve on the Ninth Judicial District Court in Louisiana
- Ann B. McIntyre (1977): First female to serve on the Fifth Judicial District Court in Louisiana
- Madeline Jasmine: First African American (female) appointed as a Judge of the Fortieth Judicial District Court in Louisiana (1991). She also the first African-American (female) Assistant District Attorney in the 29th and 40th Judicial Districts.
- Felicia Toney Williams: First female (and African American female) elected to the Louisiana Second Circuit Court of Appeal (1992) and serve as its Chief Judge (2018)
- Bernette Joshua Johnson (1969): First African American female to serve as the Associate Justice (1994-2013) and Chief Justice for the Supreme Court of Louisiana (2013)
- Patricia Minaldi (1983): First female elected as the Judge for the Fourteenth Judicial District Court in Louisiana (1995)
- Patricia Hedges: First female appointed as a Judge of the Twenty-Second Judicial District Court in Louisiana (1995)
- Lori Landry: First African American female appointed as a Judge of the Sixteenth Judicial District in Louisiana (2002)
- Jane Margaret Triche-Milazzo: First female appointed as a Judge of the Twenty-Third Judicial District in Louisiana (2008)
- Bernadette D'Souza: First Indian American (female) judge in Louisiana (2012)
- Monique F. Rauls (1993): First African American female appointed as a Judge of the Ninth District Court in Louisiana (2015)
- Amy Burford-McCartney: First female judge elected in the Forty-Second Judicial District in Louisiana (2016)
- Marissa Hutabarat (2010): First Indonesian American (female) judge in Louisiana (2020)
- Marla M. Abel: First female judge elected in the Seventeenth Judicial District in Louisiana (2019)

=== Federal judges ===
- Veronica DiCarlo Wicker: First (Italian American) female to serve as a United States District Judge for the Eastern District of Louisiana (1979)
- Nannette Jolivette Brown (1988): First African American female to serve on the U.S. District Court for the Eastern District of Louisiana (2011)
- Shelly Deckert Dick (1988): First female to serve on the U.S. District Court for the Middle District of Louisiana (2013)

=== Attorney General ===
- Liz Murrill: First female to serve as the Attorney General of Louisiana (2024)

=== Assistant Attorney General ===
- Constance A. Koury (1980): First female Assistant Attorney General of Louisiana (1997)
- Ingrid Johnson: First African American female Assistant Attorney General of Louisiana

=== United States Attorney ===
- Stephanie A. Finley: First female to serve as a U.S. Attorney in Louisiana (2010)

=== District Attorneys ===
- Keva Landrum-Johnson: First female (and African American female) to serve as a District Attorney in Louisiana (2007)
- Bridget A. Dinvaut: First African American female elected as a District Attorney in Louisiana (2015)

=== Assistant District Attorney ===
- Lori Landry: First African American female to serve as an Assistant District Attorney for the Sixteenth Judicial District in Louisiana (c. 1993)

=== Bar Association ===
- Marta-Ann Schnabel: First female to serve as the President of the Louisiana State Bar Association
- Kim M. Boyle: First African American female to serve as the President of the Louisiana State Bar Association (2009-2010)

== Firsts in local history ==
- Jane Margaret Triche-Milazzo: First female appointed as a Judge of the Twenty-Third Judicial District in Louisiana (2008) [Ascension, Assumption, and St. James Parishes, Louisiana]
- Carrie Keller (c. 1915): First female lawyer in Shreveport, Louisiana [Bossier and Caddo Parishes, Louisiana]
- Donna Y. Frazier: First female Caddo Parish attorney (equivalent to a County Attorney) in Shreveport, Louisiana (2013)
- Pammela Lattier: First (African American) female to serve as the Chief Judge for the Shreveport City Court (2020)
- Alwine Louise Smith Ragland (1935): First female to become a Judge of the Sixth Judicial District in Louisiana (1974) [East Carroll, Madison, and Tensas Parishes, Louisiana]
- Ann B. McIntyre (1977): First female lawyer in Franklin Parish, Louisiana (specifically Winnsboro, Louisiana) and Judge of the Fifth Judicial District in Louisiana [Franklin, Richland and West Carroll Parishes, Louisiana]
- Catherine D. Kimball (1970): First female elected as a Judge of the Eighteenth Judicial District Court (1983) [Iberville, Pointe Coupee, and West Baton Rouge Parishes, Louisiana]
- Patricia Hedges: First female appointed as a Judge of the Twenty-Second Judicial District Court in Louisiana (1995) [St. Tammany and Washington Parishes, Louisiana]
- Amy Burford-McCartney: First female judge elected in the Forty-Second Judicial District in Louisiana (2016) [DeSoto Parish, Louisiana]
- Jo Ellen Grant and Martha E. Sassone: First female judges respectively in Jefferson Parish, Louisiana
- June Berry Darensburg: First African American female elected to a judgeship in Jefferson Parish, Louisiana (2006)
- Diana Simon: First female litigator in Lafayette, Louisiana [Lafayette Parish, Louisiana]
- Vanessa Harris: First African American (female) to serve as a Judge of the Lafayette City Court (2021) [Lafayette Parish, Louisiana]
- Kristine Russell: First female District Attorney for the Lafourche Parish, Louisiana (2018)
- Marla Abel: First female judge in Lafourche Parish, Louisiana (upon her appointment as a Judge of the 17th Judicial District Court in 2020)
- Bernette Joshua Johnson (1969): First female (and African American female) to serve as a Judge of the Orleans Parish Civil District Court (1984) and its Chief Judge (1994)
- Angelique Reed: First African American (female) to serve as a Judge of New Orleans' First City Civil District Court (1998) and its Senior Judge
- Miriam Waltzer: First female judge to be elected to Orleans Parish Criminal District Court, Louisiana
- Kim M. Boyle: First African American female (and African American overall) to serve as the President of the New Orleans Bar Association (2003)
- Keva Landrum-Johnson: First female District Attorney for the Orleans Parish, Louisiana (2007)
- Marissa Hutabarat (2010): First Indonesian American (female) to serve as Judge of the First City Court in New Orleans, Louisiana (2020)
- Tammy Lee: First African American female to serve as Monroe City Prosecutor and Judge of the Monroe City Court (2000) [Ouachita Parish, Louisiana].
- Monique F. Rauls (1993): First African American female judge in Rapides Parish, Louisiana
- Rae Swent: First female appointed as a Judge of the Ninth Judicial District in Louisiana [Rapides Parish, Louisiana]
- Jeanne Juneau: First female judge in St. Bernard Parish, Louisiana (2013)
- Bridget A. Dinvaut: First African American female elected as the District Attorney for St. John the Baptist Parish, Louisiana (2015)
- Vanessa Harris: First (African American) female to serve as a Judge of the Opelousas City Court (2009) [St. Landry Parish, Louisiana]
- Dixie Brown: First female prosecutor in Terrebonne Parish, Louisiana (1979)
- Allie Aiello Stahl: First female judge elected in the Twenty-Sixth Judicial District in Louisiana (2024) [Bossier and Webster Parish, Louisiana]

== See also ==
- List of first women lawyers and judges in the United States
- Timeline of women lawyers in the United States
- Women in law

Louisiana:

- Courts of Louisiana
- Judiciary of Louisiana
- Law enforcement in Louisiana

== Other topics of interest ==
- List of first minority male lawyers and judges in the United States
- List of first minority male lawyers and judges in Louisiana
