= Ralph E. Tyson =

American judge (1948–2011)

Chief Judge of the United States District Court for the Middle District of Louisiana
- In office 2005–2011
- Preceded by: Frank Joseph Polozola
- Succeeded by: Brian A. Jackson

Judge of the United States District Court for the Middle District of Louisiana
- In office August 3, 1998 – July 18, 2011
- Appointed by: Bill Clinton
- Preceded by: Marcel Livaudais Jr.
- Succeeded by: Shelly Dick

Personal details
- Born: August 13, 1948 Baton Rouge, Louisiana, U.S.
- Died: July 18, 2011 (aged 62) Baton Rouge, Louisiana, U.S.
- Education: Louisiana State University (B.A.); Paul M. Hebert Law Center (J.D.)

Ralph Eric Tyson (August 13, 1948 – July 18, 2011) was a United States district judge of the United States District Court for the Middle District of Louisiana.

== Education and career ==
Born in Baton Rouge, Louisiana, Tyson received a Bachelor of Arts degree from Louisiana State University in 1970 and a Juris Doctor from the Paul M. Hebert Law Center at Louisiana State University in 1973. He was in private practice from 1973 to 1988. He was an adjunct professor, Paul M. Hebert Law Center from 1989 to 1991. He was an Instructor, Sociology/Law Enforcement Department, Southern University from 1989 to 1998. He was a judge on the Baton Rouge City Court, Louisiana from 1988 to 1993. He was a judge of the 19th Judicial District Court, East Baton Rouge Parish, Louisiana from 1993 to 1998.

== Federal judicial service ==
Tyson was a United States District Judge of the United States District Court for the Middle District of Louisiana. Tyson was nominated by President Bill Clinton on April 2, 1998, to a new seat reassigned from the United States District Court for the Eastern District of Louisiana by 111 Stat. 1174. He was confirmed by the United States Senate on July 31, 1998, and received his commission on August 3, 1998. He served as chief judge from 2005 to 2011. His service was terminated by his death on July 18, 2011.

== See also ==
- List of African-American federal judges
- List of African-American jurists

== Sources ==
Legal offices
Preceded by Marcel Livaudais Jr.	Judge of the United States District Court for the Middle District of Louisiana; 1998–2011	Succeeded by Shelly Dick
Preceded by Frank Joseph Polozola	Chief Judge of the United States District Court for the Middle District of Louisiana; 2005–2011	Succeeded by Brian A. Jackson
