= Shelly Dick =

American judge (born 1960)

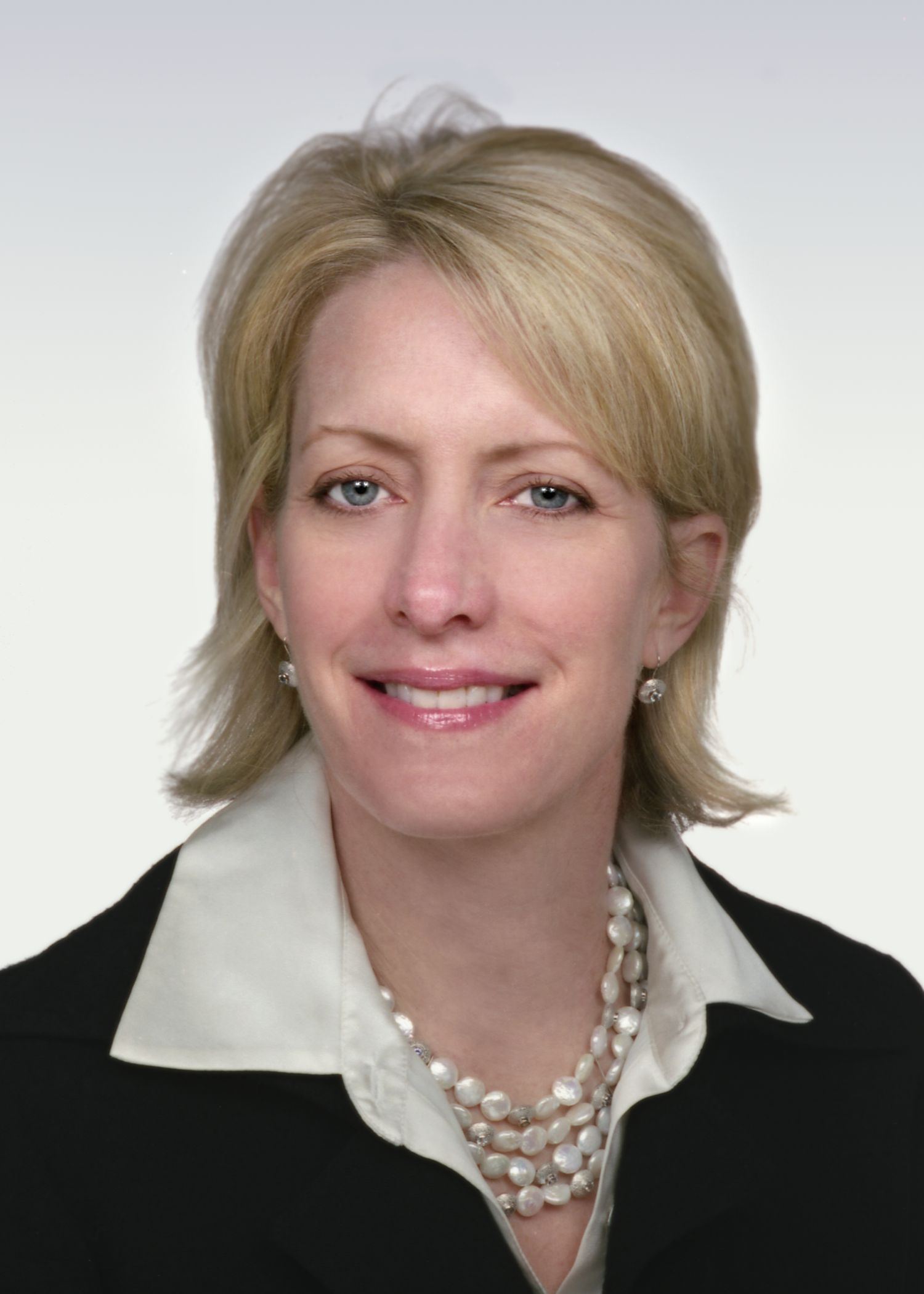

Chief Judge of the United States District Court for the Middle District of Louisiana
- Incumbent
- Assumed office July 18, 2018
- Preceded by: Brian A. Jackson

Judge of the United States District Court for the Middle District of Louisiana
- Incumbent
- Assumed office May 10, 2013
- Appointed by: Barack Obama
- Preceded by: Ralph E. Tyson

Personal details
- Born: Rachelle Lynne Deckert; 1960 (age 65–66) El Paso, Texas, U.S.
- Education: University of Texas, Austin (BBA); Louisiana State University (JD)

Rachelle Lynne "Shelly" Deckert Dick (born 1960) is the chief United States district judge of the United States District Court for the Middle District of Louisiana. She is the first female judge to serve in the Middle District.

== Biography ==
Dick was born Rachelle Lynne Deckert in 1960 in El Paso, Texas. She received her Bachelor of Business Administration degree, cum laude, from the University of Texas in 1981 and her Juris Doctor from Paul M. Hebert Law Center in 1988. From 1988 to 1994, she worked at the law firm of Gary, Field, Landry and Dornier in Baton Rouge. From 1994 to 2013, she was a partner at the law firm of Forrester, Dick & Clark. During her private career, she litigated a wide variety of cases in both state and federal courts. From 2008 to 2013, she also served as an ad hoc hearing officer appointed by the Louisiana Workforce Commission to hear workers' compensation cases and other administrative matters.

=== Federal judicial service ===
On April 25, 2012, President Barack Obama nominated Dick to serve as a United States district judge for the United States District Court for the Middle District of Louisiana, to the seat vacated by Judge Ralph E. Tyson. Senator David Vitter initially refused to return his blue slip, effectively blocking her nomination. On November 28, 2012, Senator Vitter announced that he would return his "blue slip", permitting confirmation proceedings to proceed on Dick's nomination. She received a hearing on December 12, 2012. On January 2, 2013, her nomination was returned to the President, due to the sine die adjournment of the Senate. On January 3, 2013, she was renominated to the same office. Her nomination was reported by the Senate Judiciary Committee on February 28, 2013, by voice vote. Her nomination was confirmed by voice vote on May 9, 2013. She received her commission on May 10, 2013. She became chief judge on July 18, 2018.

== See also ==
- List of first women lawyers and judges in Louisiana

Legal offices
Preceded by Ralph E. Tyson	Judge of the United States District Court for the Middle District of Louisiana; 2013–present	Incumbent
Preceded by Brian A. Jackson	Chief Judge of the United States District Court for the Middle District of Louisiana; 2018–present	Incumbent
