= Brandon Fremin =

American attorney (born 1974)

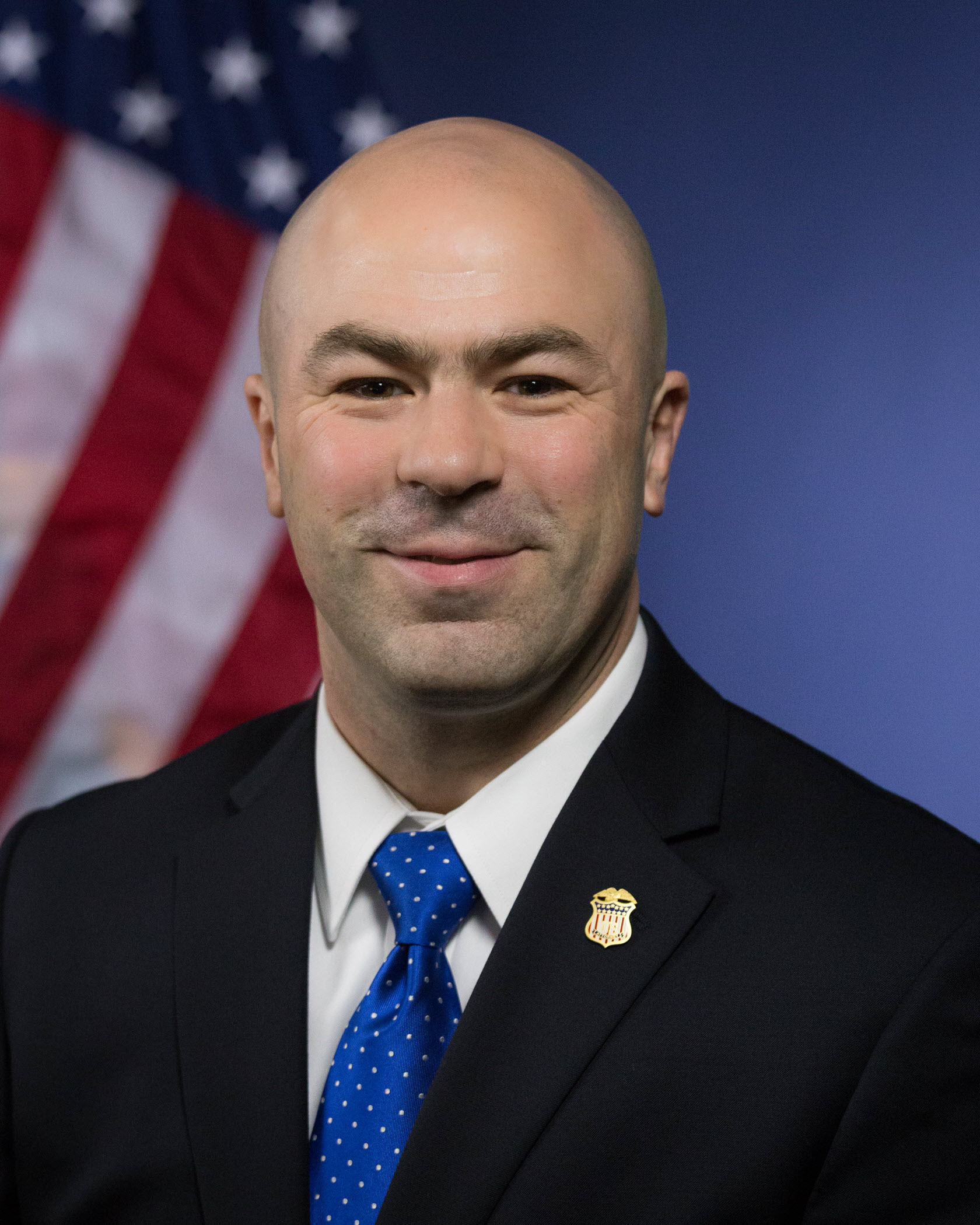

United States Attorney for the Middle District of Louisiana
- In office February 23, 2018 – February 28, 2021
- President: Donald Trump; Joe Biden
- Preceded by: Corey Amundson (acting)
- Succeeded by: Ronald C. Gathe

Personal details
- Born: Brandon Joseph Himpler; April 9, 1974 (age 52) Baton Rouge, Louisiana, U.S.
- Education: Southeastern Louisiana University (BA); Louisiana State University, Baton Rouge (JD)

Brandon Joseph Fremin (born April 9, 1974) is an American attorney who served as the United States Attorney for the Middle District of Louisiana from 2018 to 2021.

== Biography ==
Fremin received his Bachelor of Arts, cum laude, from Southeastern Louisiana University, and his Juris Doctor from the Paul M. Hebert Law Center at Louisiana State University. He enlisted in the United States Marine Corps in 1994, where he served until 2002 when he was honorably discharged as a platoon sergeant.

He previously served as an Assistant District Attorney in the Office of the District Attorney for the 19th Judicial District of Louisiana and as an Assistant United States Attorney in the U.S. Attorney's Office for the Middle District of Louisiana. Prior to his appointment as U.S. Attorney, he served as the Director of the Criminal Division for the Office of the Louisiana Attorney General.

== United States Attorney for the Middle District of Louisiana ==
On November 1, 2017, Fremin was nominated by President Donald Trump to be the next United States Attorney for the Middle District of Louisiana. On February 8, 2018, his nomination was reported out of committee by voice vote. On February 15, 2018, his nomination was confirmed by voice vote. He was sworn into office on February 23, 2018.

On February 8, 2021, he along with 55 other Trump-era attorneys were asked to resign. He submitted his resignation on February 18, effective February 28.
