= Kurt Wall =

American lawyer

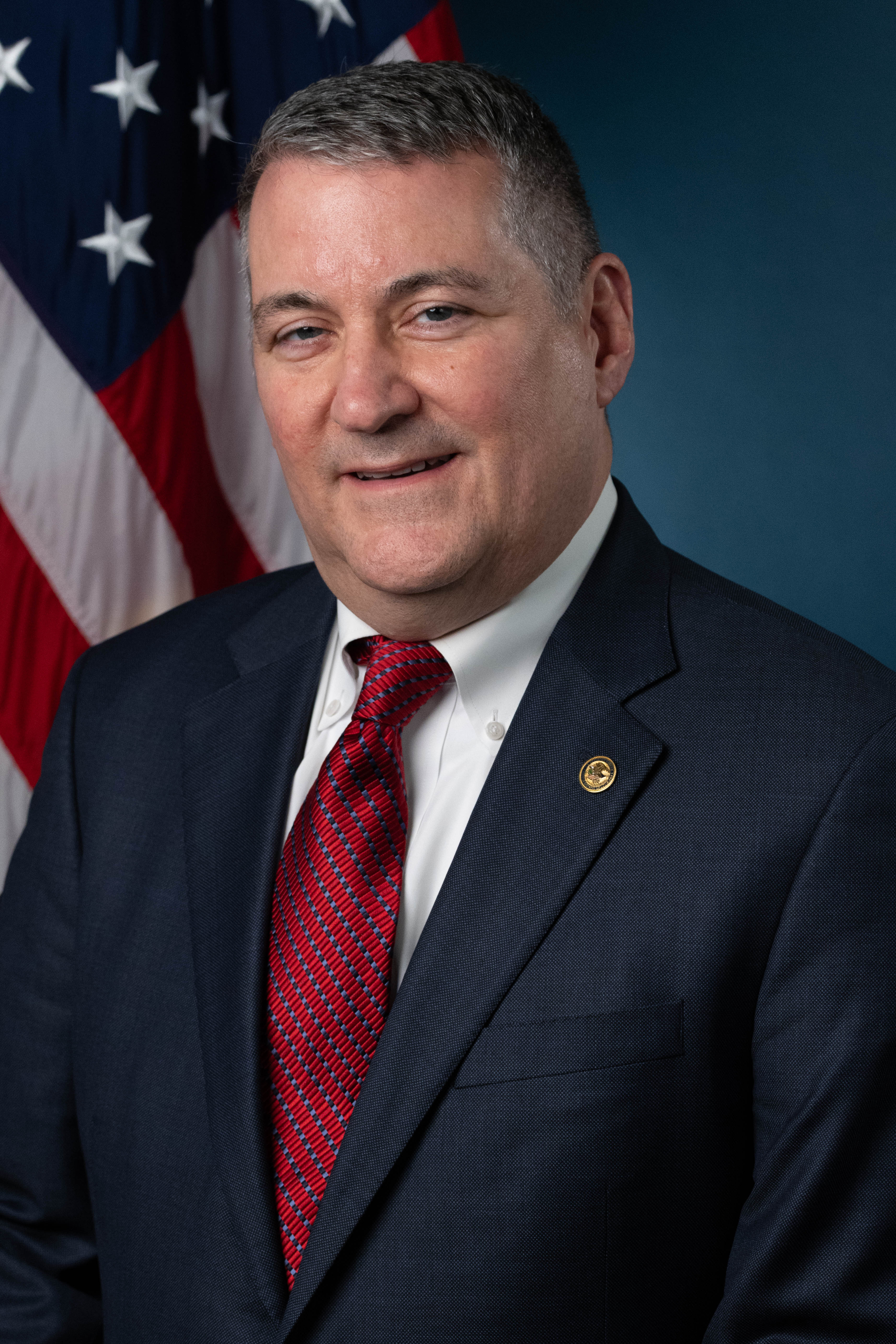

United States Attorney for the Middle District of Louisiana
- Incumbent
- Assumed office October 14, 2025
- President: Donald Trump
- Preceded by: Ronald C. Gathe

Personal details
- Education: Texas Christian University (BA); Paul M. Hebert Law Center (JD)

Kurt Wall is an American lawyer serving as the United States Attorney for the Middle District of Louisiana.

== U.S. Attorney for the Middle District of Louisiana ==
On May 6, 2025, Wall was nominated by President Donald Trump to be the United States Attorney for the Middle District of Louisiana. He was confirmed by the U.S. Senate on October 7, 2025, and sworn into office on October 14, 2025.

Legal offices
Preceded by Ronald C. Gathe	United States Attorney for the Middle District of Louisiana; 2025-	Succeeded by Incumbent
