= Marcel Livaudais Jr. =

American judge

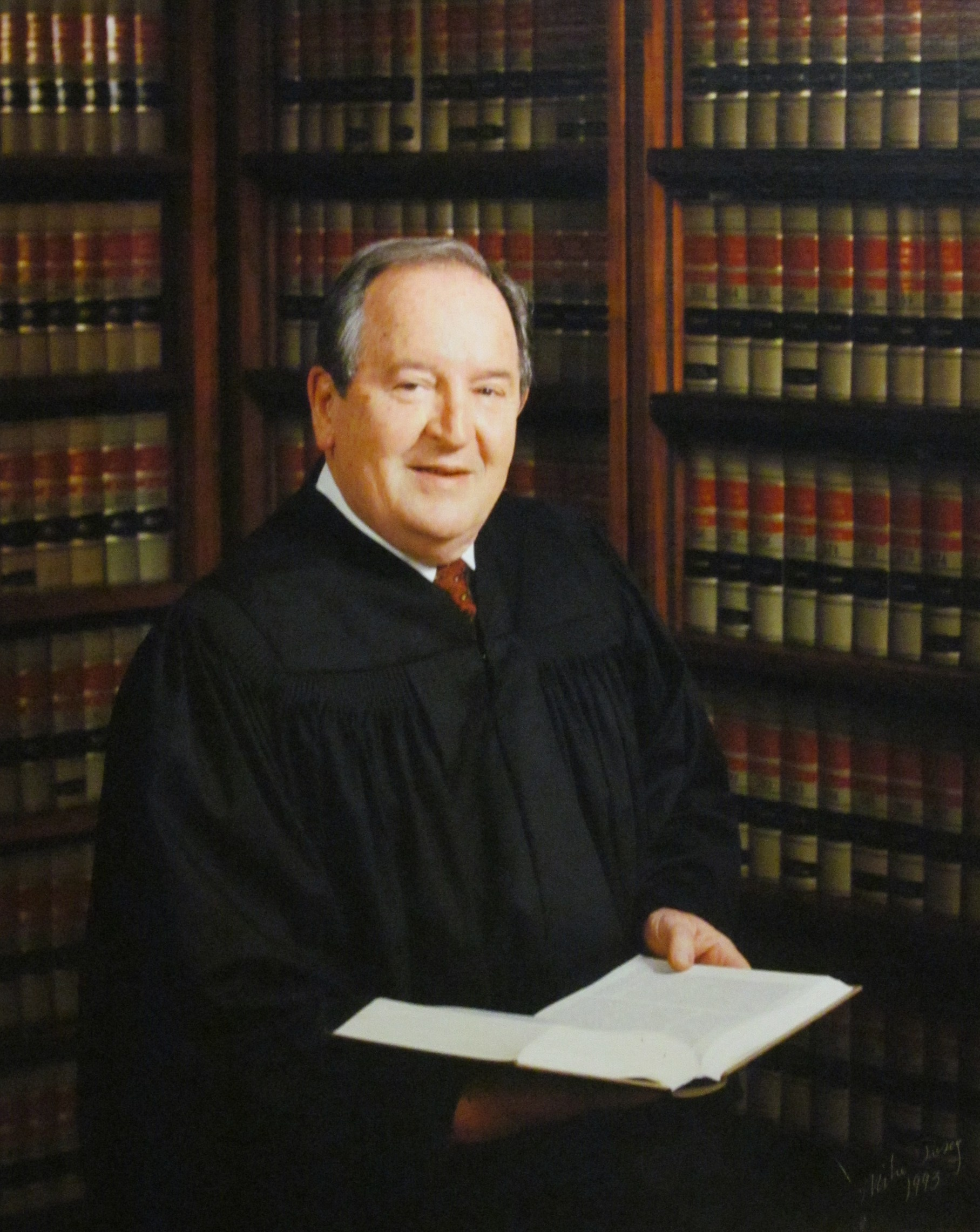

Senior Judge of the United States District Court for the Eastern District of Louisiana
- In office December 31, 1996 – December 31, 2008

Judge of the United States District Court for the Eastern District of Louisiana
- In office September 18, 1984 – December 31, 1996
- Appointed by: Ronald Reagan
- Preceded by: Fred James Cassibry
- Succeeded by: Ralph E. Tyson; Seat reassigned

Magistrate Judge of the United States District Court for the Eastern District of Louisiana
- In office 1977–1984

Personal details
- Born: March 3, 1925 New Orleans, Louisiana, U.S.
- Died: February 9, 2009 (aged 83) New Orleans, Louisiana, U.S.
- Education: Tulane University (B.A.); Tulane University Law School (J.D.)

Marcel Livaudais Jr. (March 3, 1925 – February 9, 2009) was a United States district judge of the United States District Court for the Eastern District of Louisiana.

== Education and career ==
Born in New Orleans, Louisiana, Livaudais received a Bachelor of Arts degree from Tulane University in 1945 and a Juris Doctor from Tulane University Law School in 1949. He was a commissioned Ensign in the United States Navy during World War II from 1943 to 1946. He was in private practice in New Orleans from 1949 to 1950, returning to the Navy as a Lieutenant (J.G.) from 1950 to 1952. He then resumed his private practice in New Orleans until 1977.

=== Federal judicial service ===
Livaudais served as a United States magistrate judge for the Eastern District of Louisiana from 1977 to 1984.

On June 19, 1984, Livaudais was nominated by President Ronald Reagan to a seat on the United States District Court for the Eastern District of Louisiana vacated by Judge Fred James Cassibry. Livaudais was confirmed by the United States Senate on September 17, 1984, and received his commission the following day. He assumed senior status on December 31, 1996, and served in that capacity until his retirement on December 31, 2008. He died on February 9, 2009, in New Orleans.

== Sources ==
Legal offices
Preceded by Fred James Cassibry	Judge of the United States District Court for the Eastern District of Louisiana; 1984–1996	Succeeded by Ralph E. Tyson
