= Brian A. Jackson =

American judge (born 1960)

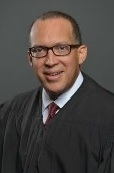

Chief Judge of the United States District Court for the Middle District of Louisiana
- In office July 18, 2011 – July 17, 2018
- Preceded by: Ralph E. Tyson
- Succeeded by: Shelly Dick

Judge of the United States District Court for the Middle District of Louisiana
- Incumbent
- Assumed office June 15, 2010
- Appointed by: Barack Obama
- Preceded by: Frank Joseph Polozola

Personal details
- Born: 1960 (age 65–66) New Orleans, Louisiana, U.S.
- Education: Xavier University of Louisiana (BA); Southern University (JD); Georgetown University (LLM)

Brian Anthony Jackson (born 1960) is an American lawyer who serves as a United States district judge of the United States District Court for the Middle District of Louisiana.

== Early life and education ==
Born in New Orleans, Jackson earned a Bachelor of Arts degree from Xavier University of Louisiana in 1982 and a Juris Doctor in 1985 from Southern University Law Center. He also earned a Master of Laws degree in international and comparative law from Georgetown University Law Center in 2000.

== Career ==
After graduating from law school in 1985, Jackson took a job as a general attorney for the Los Angeles office of the United States Immigration and Naturalization Service. He served in that capacity until 1987, when he moved to Washington, D.C., to serve as an assistant general counsel for the INS. In 1988, Jackson left INS and returned to New Orleans, taking a job in the United States Attorney's office for the Eastern District of Louisiana, where he worked first as a Special Assistant United States Attorney and then, from 1990 until 1992, as an Assistant United States Attorney. From 1992 until 1994, Jackson worked in the Executive Office for United States Attorneys in the United States Department of Justice, serving as the assistant director for the Evaluation and Review staff. From 1994 until 2002, Jackson worked in the United States Attorney's office for the Middle District of Louisiana, serving as a First Assistant United States Attorney and then in 2001 as an interim United States Attorney for the Middle District of Louisiana. During that tenure, Jackson also was detailed to Washington from 1998 until 1999 to work in the office of the United States Deputy Attorney General, serving as an associate deputy attorney general. From 2002 until 2010, Jackson worked as a partner for Liskow & Lewis, a law firm with offices in New Orleans, Lafayette, and Houston.

=== Federal judicial service ===
In January 2009, United States Senator Mary Landrieu approached Jackson and encouraged him to become a United States Attorney for the Eastern District of Louisiana. In April 2009, Landrieu notified Jackson that she was proceeding with recommending the incumbent United States Attorney, Jim Letten, remain in place, but that given Jackson's many years in the federal courts that she believed him to be well-qualified to serve as a district judge. Soon afterward, Landrieu formally recommended that President Barack Obama nominate Jackson to the seat. On October 29, 2009, Obama formally nominated Jackson to fill the vacancy, which was created when Judge Frank Joseph Polozola took senior status in 2007. Jackson's nomination was delayed for months due to a dispute between Landrieu and fellow United States Senator David Vitter, but eventually Vitter approved of the nomination and a hearing was held before the United States Senate Committee on the Judiciary. The Senate confirmed Jackson on June 15, 2010 by a 96–0 vote. He received his commission the same day. On July 18, 2011, he became chief judge of the court, upon the death of Ralph E. Tyson and served until July 17, 2018.

== See also ==
- List of African-American federal judges
- List of African-American jurists

Legal offices
Preceded by Frank Joseph Polozola	Judge of the United States District Court for the Middle District of Louisiana; 2010–present	Incumbent
Preceded by Ralph E. Tyson	Chief Judge of the United States District Court for the Middle District of Louisiana; 2011–2018	Succeeded by Shelly Dick
