= Fred James Cassibry =

American judge

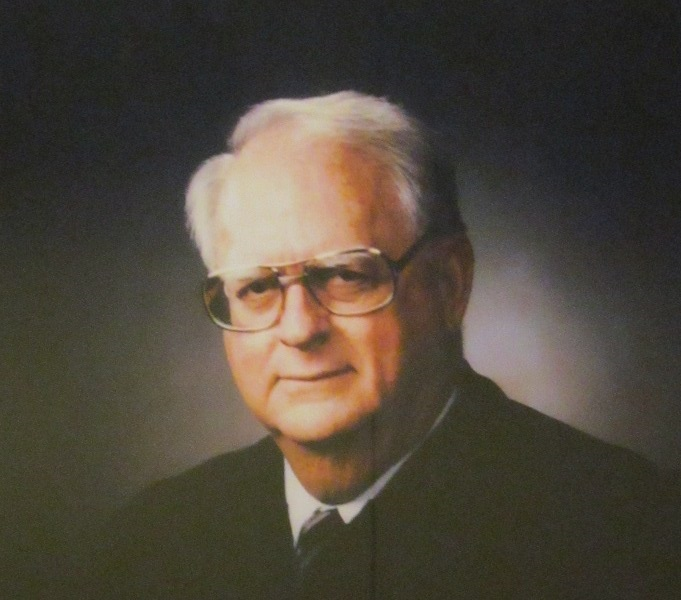

Senior Judge of the United States District Court for the Eastern District of Louisiana
- In office March 15, 1984 – April 3, 1987

Judge of the United States District Court for the Eastern District of Louisiana
- In office November 3, 1966 – March 15, 1984
- Appointed by: Lyndon B. Johnson
- Preceded by: Seat established by 80 Stat. 75
- Succeeded by: Marcel Livaudais Jr.

Personal details
- Born: Fred James Cassibry; September 26, 1918 D'Lo, Mississippi, U.S.
- Died: July 6, 1996 (aged 77) New Orleans, Louisiana, U.S.
- Education: Tulane University (B.A.); Tulane University Law School (LL.B.)

Fred James Cassibry (September 26, 1918 – July 6, 1996) was a United States district judge of the United States District Court for the Eastern District of Louisiana.

== Education and career ==
Born in D'Lo, Mississippi, Cassibry received a Bachelor of Arts degree from Tulane University in 1941 and a Bachelor of Laws from Tulane University Law School in 1943. He was in the United States Navy during World War II, from 1944 to 1946. He was then a field examiner for the National Labor Relations Board from 1946 to 1948. He entered private practice in New Orleans, Louisiana from 1948 to 1961, and was a New Orleans City Councilman from 1954 to 1961. He was a judge of the Civil District Court of the Parish of Orleans from 1961 to 1966.

== Federal judicial service ==
On October 11, 1966, Cassibry was nominated by President Lyndon B. Johnson to a new seat on the United States District Court for the Eastern District of Louisiana created by 80 Stat. 75. He was confirmed by the United States Senate on October 20, 1966, and received his commission on November 3, 1966. He assumed senior status on March 15, 1984, serving in that capacity until his retirement on April 3, 1987.

== Death ==
Cassibry died on July 6, 1996, in New Orleans.

== Honor ==
In 1999, the square surrounding the Supreme Court of Louisiana was named "Judge Fred J. Cassibry Square" in Cassibry's honor.

== Sources ==
Legal offices
Preceded by Seat established by 80 Stat. 75	Judge of the United States District Court for the Eastern District of Louisiana; 1966–1984	Succeeded by Marcel Livaudais Jr.
