= Tanya Gee =

American judge (1977–2016)

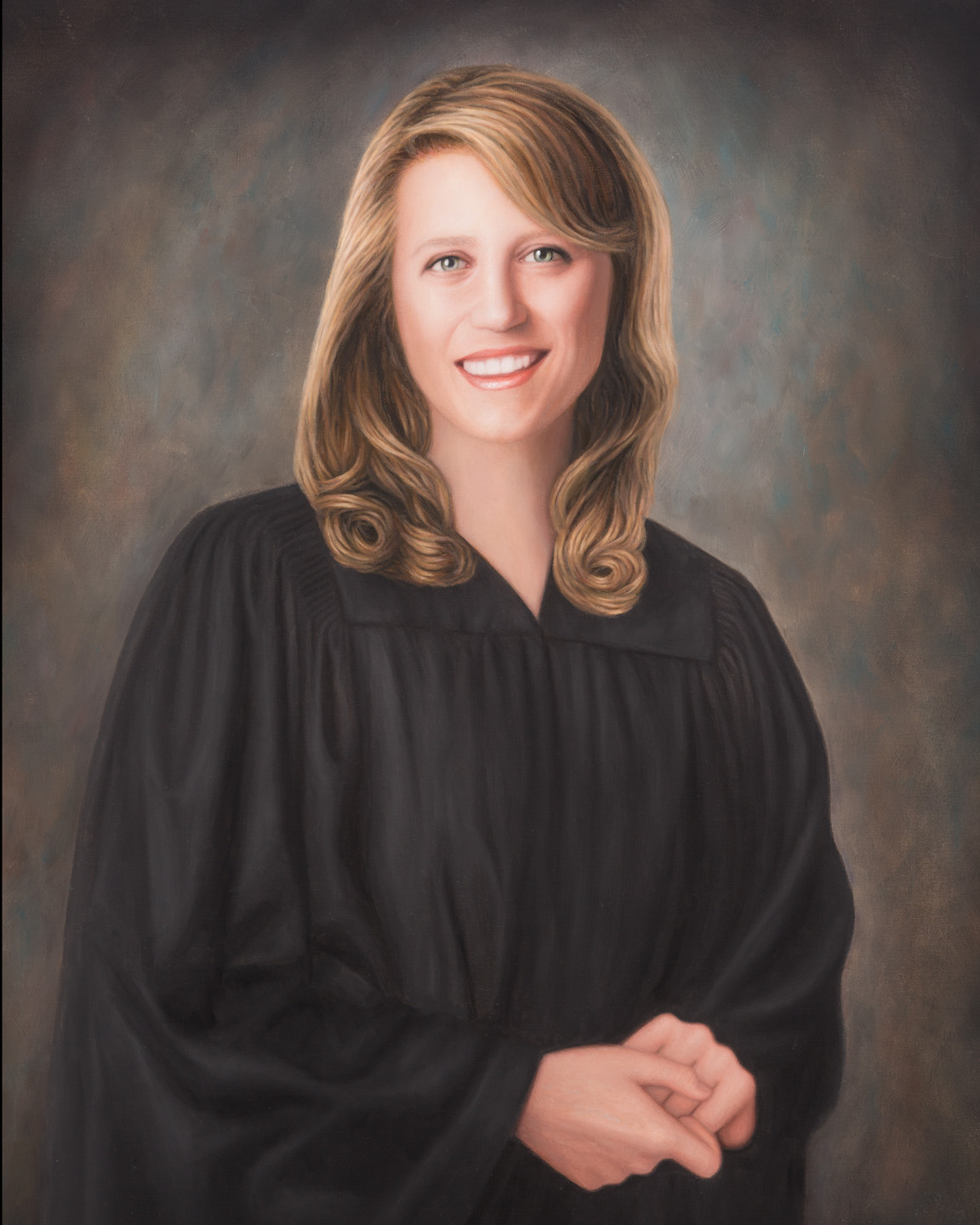
- Portrait of Judge Tanya Gee, by artist Janet Fleming Smith, currently hanging in the South Carolina Court of Appeals.

At–Large Judge of the South Carolina Circuit Court
- In office January 2015 – September 28, 2016
- Appointed by: South Carolina General Assembly

Personal details
- Born: July 15, 1977 Grand Rapids, Michigan, U.S.
- Died: September 28, 2016 (aged 39) Columbia, South Carolina, U.S.
- Cause of death: chondrosarcoma
- Education: Winthrop University (BA); University of South Carolina (JD)

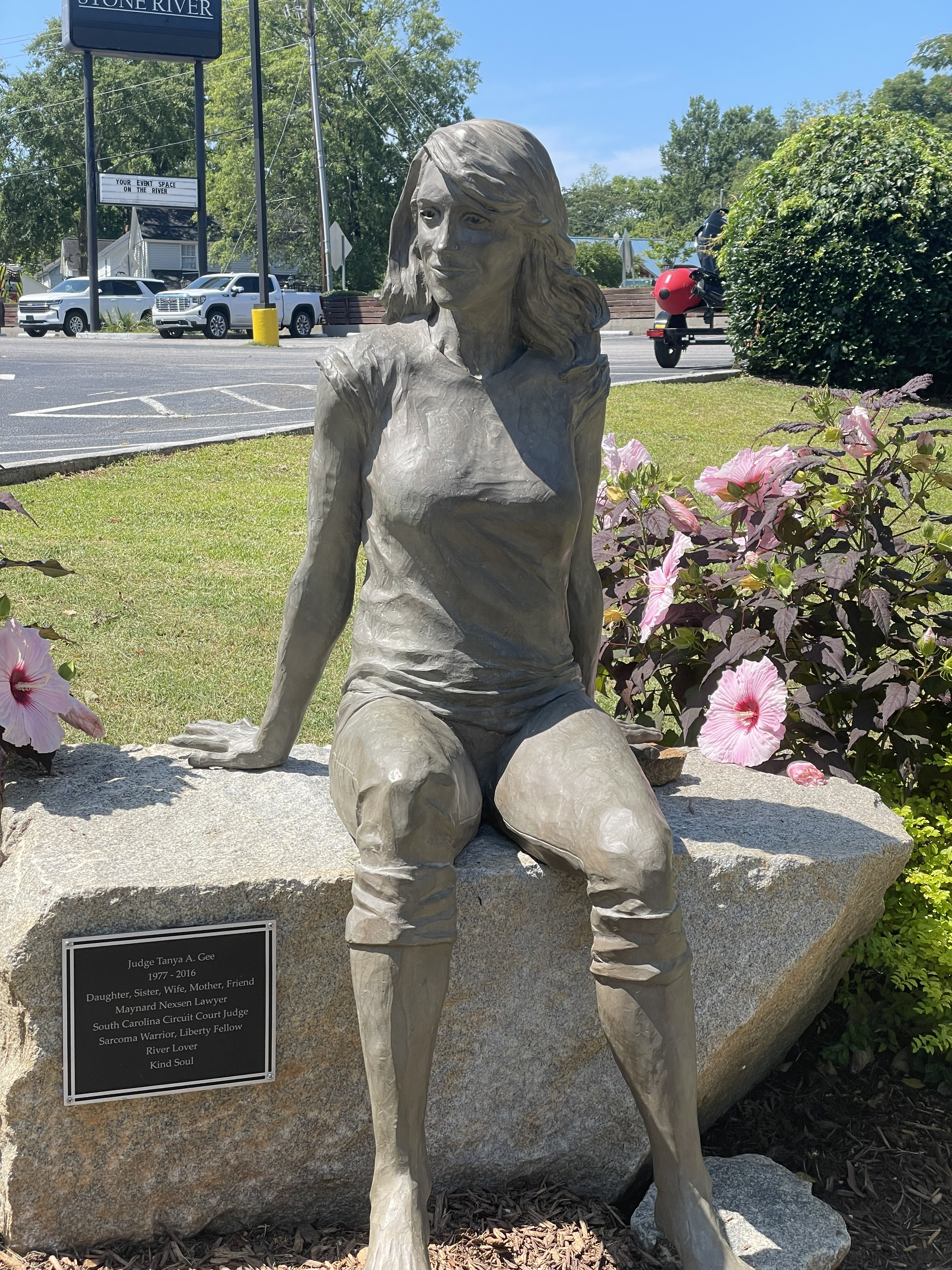
Statue of Gee at the West Columbia Riverwalk Amphitheater

Tanya Amber Gee (July 15, 1977 – September 28, 2016) was a judge of the South Carolina Circuit Court.

== Early life, education ==
Gee was born in Grand Rapids, Michigan. Her mother was originally from Germany, and her parents met while her father was serving in the army overseas. Gee was educated in public schools in Michigan until her family moved to Rock Hill, South Carolina, when she was sixteen. She graduated from Northwestern High School in 1995.

Gee earned her Bachelor of Arts, magna cum laude, from Winthrop University. In 2002, she graduated from the University of South Carolina School of Law, where she served as president of both the Pro Bono Board and the Public Interest Law Society. Upon graduation, she was awarded the Bronze Compleat Lawyer award, the most prestigious award chosen by the law school faculty and administration, as well as the Claude Sapp Award, chosen by her classmates “as possessing the best combination of scholarship, leadership and industry.”

== Legal career ==
Gee began her legal career as law clerk to Kaye Gorenflo Hearn, who was then chief judge of the South Carolina Court of Appeals. Gee was eventually appointed chief staff attorney for the Court, and in 2010, she was elected clerk of court. In 2012, she left the court to practice law at Nexsen Pruet, where she worked for several years in business litigation and on appellate work. Among her clients were state senators Paul Thurmond and Clementa Pinckney, who faced ballot challenges in 2012. In 2015, the South Carolina legislature elected Gee, at the age of 37, to a seat on the South Carolina Circuit Court.

== Awards ==
Gee was selected one of The State newspaper's 2010 “20 Under 40” class of young professionals. She was a member of the Liberty Fellowship Class of 2012. She also was awarded the Silver Compleat Lawyer Award (awarded to three selected young alumni) and making her one of only two attorneys to have been awarded both the Bronze and Silver Compleat Lawyer Awards. She also served as a board member for Sarcoma Warriors. After her death, a judicial portrait was presented to a joint session of the South Carolina Supreme Court and the South Carolina Court of Appeals. The portrait currently hangs in the state's Court of Appeals. Gee was also posthumously awarded the Judge Matthew J. Perry Civility Award from the Richland County Bar.

== Death and legacy ==
Late in her life, Gee was diagnosed with a rare form of cancer called chondrosarcoma. She was first treated in 2013 while practicing law at Nexsen Pruet. After appearing to recover, Gee was elected to the bench. However, the cancer returned in 2016, and she died on September 28, 2016.

State Supreme Court Chief Justice Costa Pleicones appointed Gee to sit on some S.C. Court of Appeals cases because she was familiar with that court’s practices and she had “an incredible work ethic.” “She was one of the best and brightest,” Pleicones said, adding that had she lived, her career would have gone upward, perhaps “ultimately to the Supreme Court.” Chief Judge James Lockemy wrote in the Court's case opinion that she was the only individual to ever serve as a law clerk, chief staff attorney, and clerk of court, “culminating at the time of her death as a member of the South Carolina Court of Appeals.” He noted that “Judge Gee was filled with pride and happiness, as were her colleagues.”

The University of South Carolina School of Law maintains a "Tanya A. Gee Warriors for Justice Fund," which facilitates scholarships.

On August 16, 2024, a statue of Gee was erected at the West Columbia Riverwalk Amphitheater in West Columbia.
