= Prim F. Escalona =

American lawyer

Prim Escalona
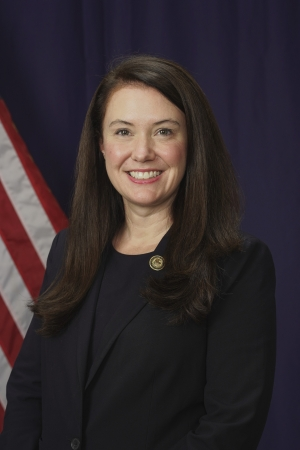
- Escalona in 2020

Interim United States Attorney for the Northern District of Alabama
- In office July 16, 2020 – February 20, 2026
- President: Donald Trump; Joe Biden; Donald Trump
- Preceded by: Jay Town
- Succeeded by: Catherine L. Crosby

Personal details
- Born: Elizabeth Prim Formby Escalona
- Party: Republican
- Education: Birmingham-Southern College (BA); University of Alabama (JD)

Elizabeth Prim Formby Escalona was the interim United States attorney for the Northern District of Alabama from July 16, 2020 to February 20, 2026. Escalona previously served as a law clerk for William H. Pryor Jr. on the U.S. Court of Appeals and as Deputy Solicitor General in the Office of the Attorney General of the State of Alabama.

== Education ==
Escalona received a Juris Doctor degree from the University of Alabama School of Law. She also received a Bachelor of Arts degree from Birmingham-Southern College.

== Career ==
From 2008 to 2009 Escalona also served as a law clerk for Judge William H. Pryor Jr. on the U.S. Court of Appeals for the Eleventh Circuit. From 2009 to 2011 she served as an associate at Maynard, Cooper & Gale. She later worked as an associate for that same firm from 2013 to 2017. From 2011 to 2012 she served as the Deputy Solicitor General in the Office of the Attorney General of the State of Alabama. She was also a visiting assistant professor at the University of Alabama School of Law from 2012 to 2013. Escalona held multiple leadership positions within the United States Department of Justice, including in the Office of Legislative Affairs and the Office of Legal Policy. Escalona also helped establish and manage a new Department component, the State and Local Law Enforcement Coordination Section.

In July 2020, Escalona was announced by then United States Attorney General William Barr as his interim pick to become the United States attorney for the Northern District of Alabama following Jay Town's resignation.
