= Joseph Bockrath =

American legal scholar

Joseph Thurston Bockrath is the R. Gordon Kean Professor of Law at the LSU Law Center. He joined the faculty in 1976 following three years as an assistant professor of marine studies at the College of Marine Studies at the University of Delaware. His teaching areas include civil procedure, constitutional law, professional responsibility, and contracts.

== Educational background ==
- A.B., 1968, California State College
- J.D., 1971, University of California, Hastings College of the Law

== Books ==
- Contracts and the Legal Environment for Engineers and Architects 6th ed. McGraw-Hill, 2000. ISBN 0-07-039363-X,

This book is part of the curriculum in legal or engineering programs at Drexel University, Western Carolina University, Anna University, Western Kentucky University, and the extension program at University of Pittsburgh.

- Contracts, Specifications & Law for Engineers
- Environmental Law for Engineers, Scientists, and Managers
- Basic Civil Procedure
