= Jay Town =

Former United States Attorney for the Northern District of Alabama

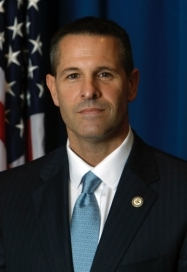

United States Attorney for the Northern District of Alabama
- In office August 11, 2017 – July 15, 2020
- President: Donald Trump
- Preceded by: Joyce Vance
- Succeeded by: Prim F. Escalona (acting)

Personal details
- Born: John Edward Town; August 26, 1973 (age 52)
- Party: Republican
- Spouse: Dana Griffin
- Education: University of Notre Dame (BA); Seton Hall University (JD)

Military service
- Allegiance: United States
- Branch/service: United States Marine Corps
- Rank: Major
- Unit: Marine Corps Judge Advocate Division

John Edward "Jay" Town (born August 26, 1973) is an American attorney and former government official who served as the United States Attorney for the Northern District of Alabama from August 2017 to July 2020. Town had previously served as a senior prosecutor in the Madison County District Attorney's Office.

== Personal life ==
Town received his Bachelor of Arts degree from the University of Notre Dame in 1995 and his Juris Doctor degree from Seton Hall University School of Law in 1998. Town was a Judge Advocate General in the United States Marine Corps, where he served on active duty and as a reservist for twelve years, achieving the rank of major. He is married to Dana Griffin.

== Career ==
From 2002 to 2005, Town served as an associate at McElroy, Deutsch, Mulvaney & Carpenter. From 2005 to 2017, he was a prosecutor in the Madison County District Attorney's Office. He also served on the executive committee of the Alabama Republican Party.

In June 2017, Town was announced as Donald Trump's nominee to become the United States Attorney for the Northern District of Alabama. He was confirmed to the position by the United States Senate on August 3, 2017. Town was sworn in as the U.S. Attorney for the Northern District of Alabama on August 11, 2017, by Chief District Judge Karon O. Bowdre. Town chaired or served on a number of committees during his tenure, including the China Initiative and the Presidential Commission on Law Enforcement and the Administration of Justice.

On July 10, 2020, Town announced he would resign as U.S. Attorney effective July 15, 2020. Town was the Vice President and General Counsel at Gray Analytics, a military defense and cybersecurity contractor located in Huntsville, Alabama.

In 2025, Jay Town became the Chief Compliance Officer at Radiance Technologies, a large defense and aerospace contractor.

Up until 2024, Town made regular media appearances as a legal expert explaining the federal and state indictments against Trump and is now a legal analyst for Newsmax. He initially supported Ron DeSantis in the 2024 Republican presidential primary, but later switched his endorsement to Trump. Town has been published in both the University of Notre Dame Law Review and the Belmont University Law Review.
