= Ronald C. Gathe =

American lawyer (born 1974)

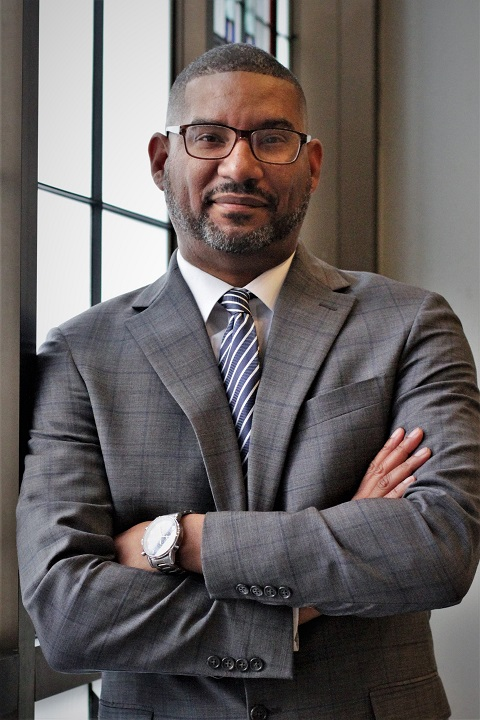

United States Attorney for the Middle District of Louisiana
- In office December 13, 2021 – February 19, 2025
- President: Joe Biden; Donald Trump
- Preceded by: Brandon Fremin
- Succeeded by: Kurt Wall

Personal details
- Born: Ronald Charles Gathe Jr. 1974 (age 51–52) New Roads, Louisiana, U.S.
- Education: Xavier University of Louisiana (BS); Southern University (JD)

Ronald Charles Gathe Jr. (born 1974) is an American lawyer who served as the United States attorney for the Middle District of Louisiana.

== Education ==
Gathe received a Bachelor of Science degree from Xavier University of Louisiana in 1996 and a Juris Doctor from Southern University Law Center in 2000.

== Career ==
Gathe began his legal career as a law clerk for Judge James Best of the 18th Judicial District Court in Louisiana from 2000 to 2001. From 2001 to 2021, he was in private practice at his own law firm. From 2001 to 2021, he served as an assistant district attorney in the 19th Judicial District Attorney's Office in Louisiana, where he served as section chief from 2009 to 2021. In January 2021, he became chief of trials for the 18th Judicial District Attorney's Office in Louisiana. He served as the vice president of membership for the National Black Prosecutors Association.

=== U.S. attorney for the Middle District of Louisiana ===
On November 12, 2021, President Joe Biden announced his intent to nominate Gathe to be the United States attorney for the Middle District of Louisiana. On November 15, 2021, his nomination was sent to the United States Senate. On December 2, 2021, his nomination was reported out of committee by a voice vote. On December 7, 2021, his nomination was confirmed in the United States Senate by voice vote. He was sworn into office on December 13, 2021.

On February 19, 2025, Gathe was fired from his post.

Legal offices
Preceded by Brandon Fremin	United States Attorney for the Middle District of Louisiana; 2021–2025	Succeeded by April M. Leon
