= John D. Johns =

American businessman and civic leader

- Born: February 8, 1952 (age 74); Gadsden, Alabama
- Education: University of Alabama (B.A.); Harvard Business School (M.B.A); Harvard Law School (J.D)
- Spouse: Dr. Nancy Dunlap Johns
- Children: Dr. Anna Johns Hrom and James Dixon Johns

John D. Johns (born February 8, 1952) was born in Gadsden, Alabama to J. D. and Margaret Griffin Johns.

== Education and career ==
He graduated with honors in 1974 from the University of Alabama. Johns was a member of Phi Beta Kappa and Omicron Delta Kappa, and served as president of the Jasons Honor Society and Kappa Alpha Order. He then earned a dual juris doctor from Harvard Law School and master of business administration from Harvard Business School in 1978.

Johns joined the Protective Life Corporation in 1993 as Executive Vice President and CFO. He served as chairman, president and CEO of Protective Life Corporation from 2002 to 2017, and as executive chairman from 2017 to 2019. Earlier in his career, Johns served as General Counsel at Sonat and helped found Maynard Cooper & Gale, a law firm in Birmingham, Alabama. He was inducted into the Alabama Academy of Honor in late 2013, in part for his nine years of service to the Alabama Commission on Higher Education.
