= United States District Court for the Middle District of Louisiana =

United States federal district court in Louisiana

Coordinates: 30.4501°N 91.1825°W

- (M.D. La.)
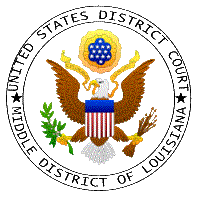

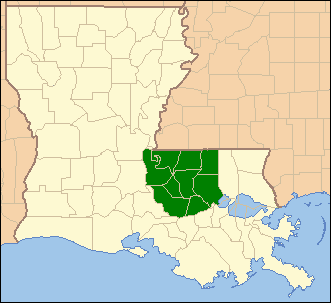
- Location: Baton Rouge
- Appeals to: Fifth Circuit
- Established: December 18, 1971
- Judges: 3
- Chief Judge: Shelly Dick

Officers of the court
- U.S. Attorney: Kurt Wall
- U.S. Marshal: William Travis Brown Jr.
- www.lamd.uscourts.gov

The United States Court for the Middle District of Louisiana (in case citations, M.D. La.) comprises the parishes of Ascension, East Baton Rouge, East Feliciana, Iberville, Livingston, Pointe Coupee, St. Helena, West Baton Rouge, and West Feliciana. Court is held at the Russell B. Long United States Courthouse in Baton Rouge, Louisiana. It falls under the jurisdiction of the United States Court of Appeals for the Fifth Circuit (except for patent claims and claims against the U.S. government under the Tucker Act, which are appealed to the Federal Circuit).

The United States Attorney's Office for the Middle District of Louisiana represents the United States in civil and criminal litigation in the court. As of October 14, 2025 the United States attorney is Kurt Wall.

== History ==
On March 26, 1804, Congress organized the Territory of Orleans and created the United States District Court for the District of Orleans - the only time Congress provided a territory with a district court equal in its authority and jurisdiction to those of the states. The United States District Court for the District of Louisiana was established on April 8, 1812, by 2 Stat. 701, several weeks before Louisiana was formally admitted as a state of the union. The District was thereafter subdivided and reformed several times. It was first subdivided into Eastern and Western Districts on March 3, 1823, by 3 Stat. 774.

On February 13, 1845, Louisiana was reorganized into a single District with one judgeship, by 5 Stat. 722, but was again divided into Eastern and the Western Districts on March 3, 1849, by 9 Stat. 401. Congress again abolished the Western District of Louisiana and reorganized Louisiana as a single judicial district on July 27, 1866, by 14 Stat. 300. On March 3, 1881, by 21 Stat. 507, Louisiana was for a third time divided into Eastern and the Western Districts, with one judgeship authorized for each. The Middle District was formed from portions of those two Districts on December 18, 1971, by 85 Stat. 741, making it one of the youngest districts in the United States. It is the third youngest district, ahead of only the District for the Northern Mariana Islands (1976) and the Central District of Illinois (1978).

== Current judges ==
As of July 18, 2018:

#	Title	Judge	Duty station	Born	Term of service			Appointed by
#	Title	Judge	Duty station	Born	Active	Chief	Senior	Appointed by
7	Chief Judge	Shelly Dick	Baton Rouge	1960	2013–present	2018–present	—	Obama
6	District Judge	Brian A. Jackson	Baton Rouge	1960	2010–present	2011–2018	—	Obama
8	District Judge	John W. deGravelles	Baton Rouge	1949	2014–present	—	—	Obama

== Former judges ==
#	Judge	Born–died	Active service	Chief Judge	Senior status	Appointed by	Reason for termination
1	Elmer Gordon West	1914–1992	1972–1979 (Note: Reassigned from the Eastern District of Louisiana)	1978–1979	1979–1992	Kennedy/Operation of law	death
2	John Victor Parker	1928–2014	1979–1998	1979–1998	1998–2014	Carter	death
3	Frank Joseph Polozola	1942–2013	1980–2007	1998–2005	2007–2013	Carter	death
4	Ralph E. Tyson	1948–2011	1998–2011	2005–2011	—	Clinton	death
5	James Joseph Brady	1944–2017	2000–2013	—	2013–2017	Clinton	death

== Chief judges ==
Chief judges have administrative responsibilities with respect to their district court. Unlike the Supreme Court, where one justice is specifically nominated to be chief, the office of chief judge rotates among the district court judges. To be chief, a judge must have been in active service on the court for at least one year, be under the age of 65, and have not previously served as chief judge.

A vacancy is filled by the judge highest in seniority among the group of qualified judges. The chief judge serves for a term of seven years, or until age 70, whichever occurs first. The age restrictions are waived if no members of the court would otherwise be qualified for the position.

When the office was created in 1948, the chief judge was the longest-serving judge who had not elected to retire, on what has since 1958 been known as senior status, or declined to serve as chief judge. After August 6, 1959, judges could not become or remain chief after turning 70 years old. The current rules have been in operation since October 1, 1982.

== Succession of seats ==
Seat 1
Seat reassigned from Eastern District on April 16, 1972 by 85 Stat. 741
E. West	1972–1979
Polozola	1980–2007
Jackson	2010–present

Seat 2
Seat established on October 20, 1978 by 92 Stat. 1629
Parker	1979–1998
Brady	2000–2013
deGravelles	2014–present

Seat 3
Seat reassigned from Eastern District on October 6, 1997 by 111 Stat. 1173
Tyson	1998–2011
Dick	2013–present

== U.S. Attorneys ==
- Douglas M. Gonzales 1972-76
- Cheney C. Joseph Jr. 1976-77
- Donald L. Beckner 1977-81
- Stanford O. Bardwell Jr. 1981-86
- P. Raymond Lamonica 1986-94
- L. J. Hymel 1994-2001
- David R. Dugas 2001-2010
- Don Cazayoux Jr. 2010-2013
- James Walter Frazer Green 2013-2017
- Corey Amundson 2017-2018
- Brandon Fremin 2018-2021
- Ronald C. Gathe 2021-2025
- April M. Leon (acting) 2025
- Ellison C. Travis (acting) 2025
- Kurt Wall 2025-

== See also ==
- Courts of Louisiana
- List of current United States district judges
- List of United States federal courthouses in Louisiana
- United States District Court for the Eastern District of Louisiana
- United States District Court for the Western District of Louisiana
- United States Court of Appeals for the Fifth Circuit
