= Paul M. Hebert Law Center =

Public law school in Baton Rouge, Louisiana, US

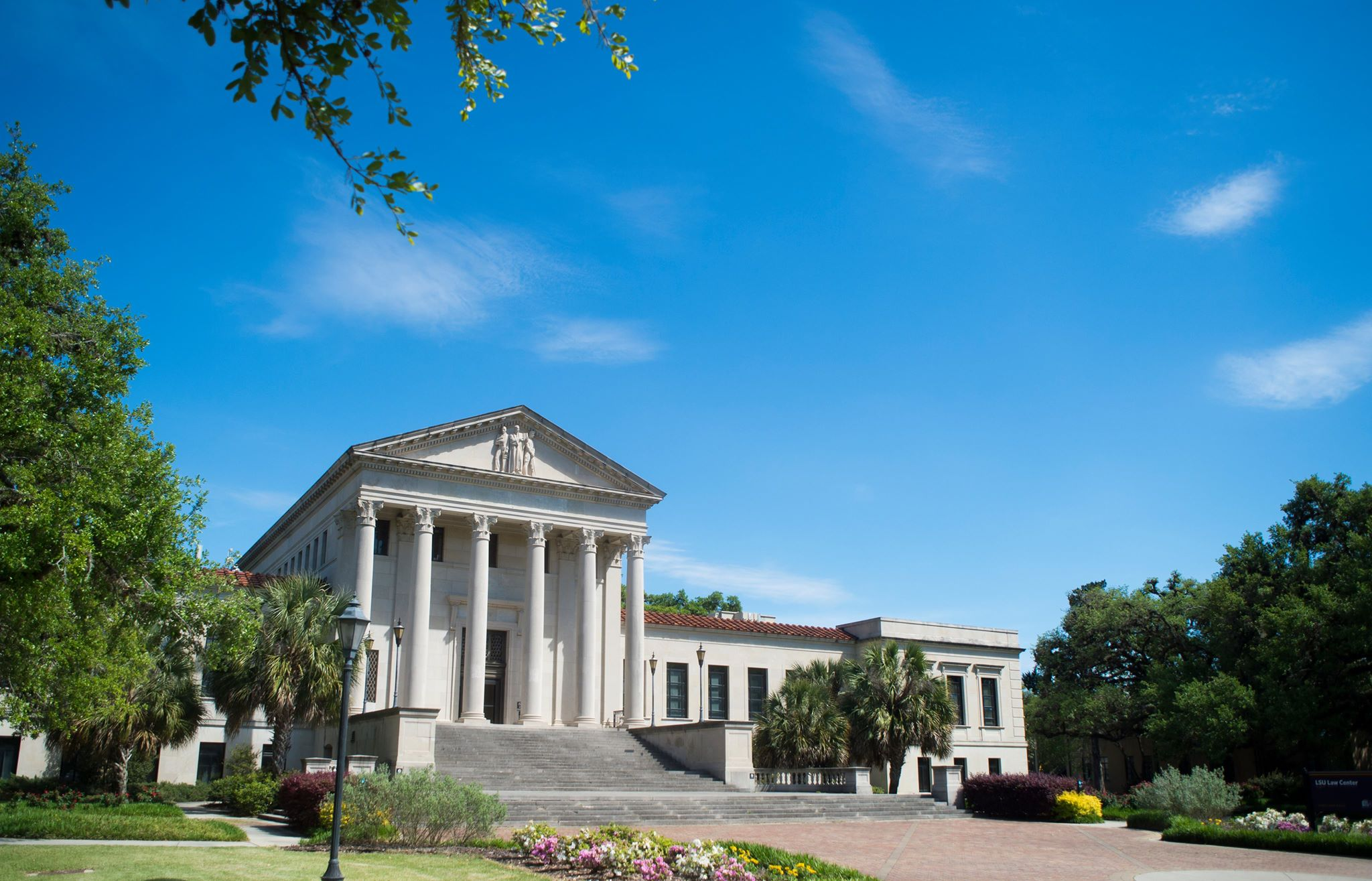
- Parent school: Louisiana State University System
- Established: 1906
- School type: Public law school
- Dean: Alena M. Allen
- Location: 1 East Campus Drive; Baton Rouge, Louisiana, United States; 30°24′52″N 91°10′30″W
- Enrollment: 655
- Faculty: 80
- USNWR ranking: 91st (tie) (2024)
- Bar pass rate: 92.2% (2023)
- Website: law.lsu.edu

The Paul M. Hebert Law Center, often styled "LSU Law", is a public law school in Baton Rouge, Louisiana. It is part of the Louisiana State University System and located on the main campus of Louisiana State University.

Because Louisiana is a civil law state, unlike its 49 common law sister states, the curriculum includes both civil law and common law courses, requiring 94 hours for graduation, the most in the United States. In the Fall of 2002, the LSU Law Center became the sole United States law school, and only one of two law schools in the Western Hemisphere, offering a course of study leading to the simultaneous conferring of a J.D. (Juris Doctor), which is the normal first degree in American law schools, and a D.C.L. (Diploma in Comparative Law), which recognizes the training its students receive in both the common and the civil law.

Until voting in April 2015 to realign itself as an academic unit of Louisiana State University, the Paul M. Hebert Law Center was an autonomous school. Its designation as a Law Center, rather than Law School, derives not only from its formerly independent campus status but also from the centralization on its campus of J.D. and post-J.D. programs, foreign and graduate programs, including European programs at the Jean Moulin University Lyon 3 School of Law, France, and the University of Louvain, Belgium, and the direction of the Louisiana Law Institute and the Louisiana Judicial College, among other initiatives.

According to the school's 2017 ABA-required disclosures, 81.3% of the Class of 2017 obtained full-time, long-term, bar passage-required employment nine months after graduation, excluding solo practitioners.

== History ==
In 1904, LSU constitutional law professor Arthur T. Prescott, who earlier had been the founding president of Louisiana Tech University, became the first to propose the establishment of a law school at LSU.

The law school came to fruition in 1906, under LSU president Thomas Duckett Boyd, with nineteen founding students. Since 1924, the LSU Law Center has been a member of the Association of American Law Schools and approved by the American Bar Association. The Law Center was renamed in honor of Dean Paul M. Hebert (1907–1977), the longest serving Dean of the LSU Law School, who served in that role with brief interruptions from 1937 until his death in 1977. One of these interruptions occurred in 1947–1948, when he was appointed as a judge for the United States Military Tribunals in Nuremberg.

== Demographics ==
In 2011, the Law Center received 1,437 applications for the J.D./C.L. program for an enrolled class of 239. The current first-year class includes graduates from 80 colleges and universities throughout the nation. Women make up 49% of the class, 51% are men. Approximately 35% of the class of 2014 came from outside Louisiana representing 19 others states, United States Virgin Islands, France, and China.

== Louisiana Law Review ==
The Center publishes Louisiana Law Review, the flagship law review for the State of Louisiana. The first issue of the Louisiana Law Review went into print in November 1938. The Louisiana Law Review currently ranks in the top 200 student-edited journals, and among the top 100 journals for the highest number of cases citing to a law review.

== LSU Journal of Energy Law and Resources ==
The Center publishes the biannual open-access LSU Journal of Energy Law and Resources that focuses on the law of energy development, energy industries, natural resources, and sustainable development.

== Employment ==
According to the Law Center's official 2018 ABA-required disclosures, 89% of the Class of 2018 obtained full-time, long-term, bar passage-required employment 10 months after graduation, excluding solo-practitioners. The school's Law School Transparency under-employment score is 11.6%, indicating the percentage of the Class of 2018 unemployed, pursuing an additional degree, or working in a non-professional, short-term, or part-time job nine months after graduation.

== Costs ==
The total cost of attendance (indicating the cost of tuition, fees, and living expenses) at the Law Center for the 2014–2015 academic year is $39,880.75. The Law School Transparency estimated debt-financed cost of attendance for three years is $160,966.

== See also ==
- Joseph T. Bockrath
- Tom Galligan
- Louisiana State University, Baton Rouge
