= A. J. McNamara =

American judge (1936–2014)

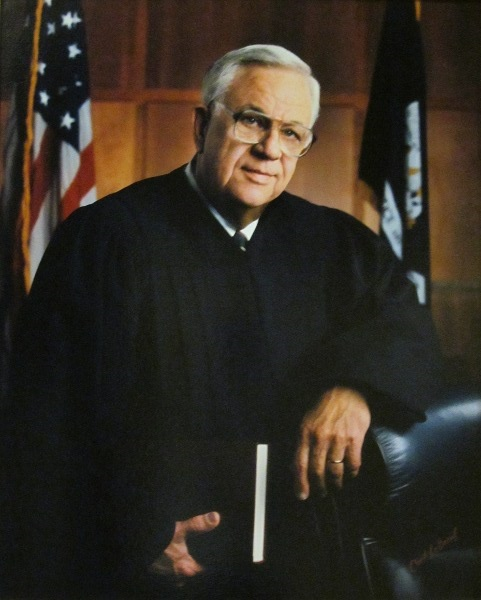

Senior Judge of the United States District Court for the Eastern District of Louisiana
- In office June 9, 2001 – December 2, 2014

Chief Judge of the United States District Court for the Eastern District of Louisiana
- In office 1999–2001
- Preceded by: Morey Leonard Sear
- Succeeded by: Edith Brown Clement

Judge of the United States District Court for the Eastern District of Louisiana
- In office June 21, 1982 – June 9, 2001
- Appointed by: Ronald Reagan
- Preceded by: Edward James Boyle Sr.
- Succeeded by: Jay C. Zainey

Louisiana State Representative
- In office 1976–1980

Personal details
- Born: Abel John McNamara; June 9, 1936 New Orleans, Louisiana, U.S.
- Died: December 2, 2014 (aged 78) Metairie, Louisiana, U.S.
- Cause of death: Progressive supranuclear palsy
- Resting place: Greenwood Cemetery, New Orleans
- Party: Democratic until 1977; Republican from 1977
- Education: Louisiana State University (B.S.); Loyola University New Orleans College of Law (J.D.)

Abel John "A. J." McNamara (June 9, 1936 – December 2, 2014), was a Louisiana politician and judge who served in the Louisiana House of Representatives from 1976 to 1980 and as a United States district judge of the New Orleans–based United States District Court for the Eastern District of Louisiana from 1982 to 2001.

== Early life, education and career ==
Born in New Orleans, Louisiana, to Henry D. and Ruby (née Price), McNamara graduated from the Roman Catholic Jesuit High School in 1954. He received a B.S. in engineering from Louisiana State University in Baton Rouge in 1959, and thereafter served in the United States Navy until 1962. He received a J.D. from Loyola University New Orleans College of Law in 1968. From 1966 to 1968 he was a bailiff and law clerk for United States District Judge Herbert William Christenberry. After gaining admission to the bar in 1968, he entered private practice until 1982.

== Political life ==
In 1975, McNamara was elected to represent Jefferson Parish in suburban New Orleans in the Louisiana House of Representatives. He was elected in the first-ever nonpartisan blanket primary (also called the jungle primary), and was a Democrat from 1976 to 1977, and a Republican from 1977 to 1980. He did not seek reelection in 1979.

== Federal judicial service ==
On May 5, 1982, President Reagan nominated McNamara to a seat on the United States District Court for the Eastern District of Louisiana vacated by Judge Edward James Boyle Sr. He was confirmed by the United States Senate on June 18, 1982, and received his commission on June 21, 1982. He served as Chief Judge from 1999 to 2001, assuming senior status on June 9, 2001. His service terminated on December 2, 2014, due to his death. McNamara was succeeded on the court by Judge Jay C. Zainey, a nominee of President George W. Bush, who was confirmed on October 10, 2001.

== Private life ==
McNamara married Alma J. Loisel (c. 1939–2023), with whom he had had two sons, John Price McNamara and Dwight Loisel McNamara, and two daughters, Joni McNamara Parent and Nancy Ann McNamara Miller. McNamara and his wife lived in Metairie, Louisiana.

McNamara died at his home of progressive supranuclear palsy at the age of 78. He was interred at Greenwood Cemetery, New Orleans.

== Sources ==
Legal offices
Preceded by Edward James Boyle Sr.	Judge of the United States District Court for the Eastern District of Louisiana; 1982–2001	Succeeded by Jay C. Zainey
Preceded by Morey Leonard Sear	Chief Judge of the United States District Court for the Eastern District of Louisiana; 1999–2001	Succeeded by Edith Brown Clement
