= Ruiz v. Shell Oil Co =

Ruiz v Shell Oil Co
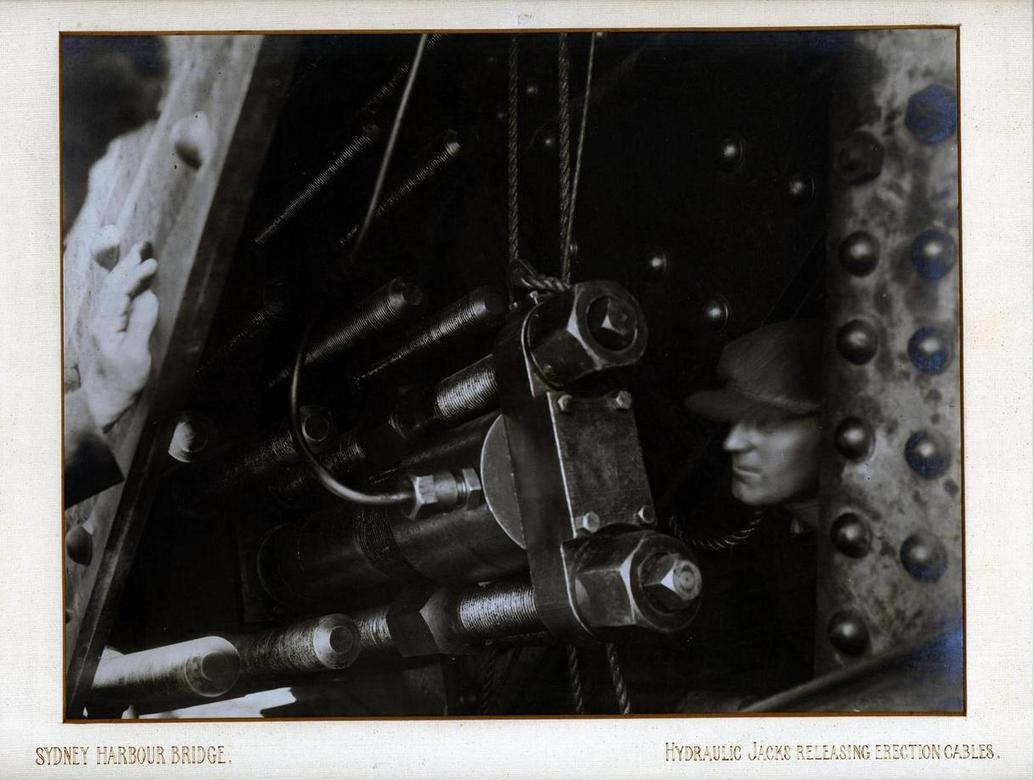
- Court: US Supreme Court
- Decided: June 23, 1969
- Citations: 413 F2d 310 (1969), [1969] USCA5 758

Court membership
- Judges sitting: Ainsworth, Godbold and Dawkins

Keywords
- Employment relationship

Ruiz v Shell Oil Co, 413 F2d 310 (1969) is a US labor law case, concerning the scope of labor rights in the United States.

== Facts ==
Mr Ruiz was employed by Zenith, Inc in Harvey, Louisiana. Zenith had a contract with Shell Oil Co to do welding, removing a dent in a metal tank that separated oil and water on one of Shell's barges. The tank was made by the National Tank Company, and it contracted with Shell to supervise tank repair, providing an employee named Mr Crowley. NTC had no contract with Zenith. Mr Ruiz was injured when a 30-ton hydraulic jack struck him after being dislodged on the barge. He sued Shell and NTC in negligence for the barge being unseaworthy, and Shell claimed damages from NTC. A jury awarded Mr Ruiz $50,000, and found only NTC's negligence was a proximate cause of injury.

== Judgment ==
The Court of Appeals, Fifth Circuit held that NTC was liable to Ruiz, although on the facts it did not count as an employer. Relevant to that question would be which employer had more control, whose work was being performed, whether there were agreements in place, who provided tools, had a right to discharge the employee, or had the obligation to pay. Robert A. Ainsworth Jr. delivered the Court's judgment.

National's defense throughout these proceedings, including its motions for summary judgment, judgment n. o. v., and for a partial new trial, is that appellant Ruiz was its borrowed servant at the time the injury occurred, which legal theory, if established, would limit National's liability to compensation under the Longshoremen's and Harbor Workers' Compensation Act, 33 U.S.C. § 901 et seq., since Ruiz' exclusive remedy would thus be under that Act. The trial court denied these motions and refused to submit the issue of the borrowed-servant theory to the jury. Based on the verdict, the court awarded judgment in favor of appellant and against National in the sum of $50,000 and allowed indemnity in favor of Shell against National for costs and attorney's fees.

We find no error in the court's rulings and affirm.

Various criteria have been considered in determining when the doctrine of borrowed servant is applicable. While no one of these factors, or any combination of them, is decisive, and no fixed test is used to determine the existence of a borrowed-servant relationship, the following tests have been given great weight.

The factor of control is perhaps the most universally accepted standard for establishing an employer-employee relationship, and what constitutes "control" has been the subject of much litigation. National, in attempting to show that such a relationship existed, cites the testimony of several witnesses which it contends evidences its control over Ruiz and the work he was performing at the time of his injury. We have, however, carefully studied the record and find no element of control by National. The evidence indicates nothing more than cooperation between the several Zenith employees aboard the barge, under the direction of Zenith's tool pusher, with National's supervisor. In considering whether the power exists to control and direct a servant, a careful distinction must be made "between authoritative direction and control, and mere suggestion as to details or the necessary co-operation, where the work furnished is part of a larger undertaking." Standard Oil Co. v. Anderson, [1909] USSC 40; 212 U.S. 215, 222 [1909] USSC 40; 29 S.Ct. 252, 254 [1909] USSC 40; 53 L.Ed. 480 (1909). "Co-operation," as distinguished from "subordination," is not enough to create an employment relationship. Id., 212 U.S. at 226, 29 S.Ct. at 256.

Although a formal agreement between the two employers is not considered indispensable to the borrowed-servant relationship, the very terms "borrowed" and "loaned" connote some type of agreement, understanding, or meeting of the minds between the borrower and the lender. The cases cited by appellant consistently imply such an agreement. However, the record indicates that there was no type of understanding or agreement between Zenith and National. Nor was there any agreement or acquiescence by Ruiz that he be employed by National, another factor indicative of the borrowed-servant relationship. Standard Oil Co. v. Anderson, 212 U.S. at 220, 29 S.Ct. at 253. Ruiz did not even know that the one National man aboard the barge, Crowley, was an employee of that company, but thought he was a Shell employee. Implicit in the borrowed-servant conception, and absent here, is temporary termination by the general employer of its relationship with the servant. Other factors which have been considered are the furnishing by the temporary employer of the necessary instruments and the place for performance of the work in question, employment of the servant over a considerable length of time, the fact that work being performed is that of the temporary employer, and the customary right to discharge the servant and the obligation for payment of his wages. None of these factors is remotely attributable to National.

== See also ==
- United States labor law
