= Anna St. John =

American judge (born 1979)

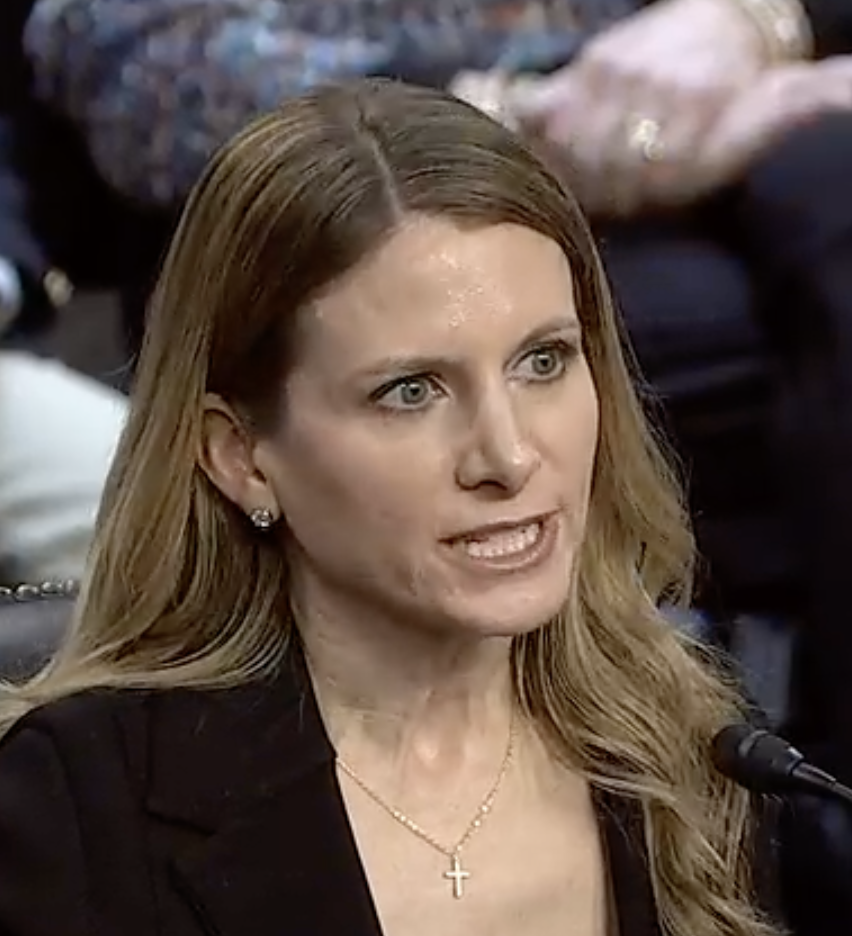

Judge of the United States Court of Appeals for the Fifth Circuit
- Designate
- Assuming office TBD
- Appointed by: Donald Trump
- Succeeding: Kurt D. Engelhardt

Judge of the United States District Court for the Eastern District of Louisiana
- Incumbent
- Assumed office April 13, 2026
- Appointed by: Donald Trump
- Preceded by: Sarah S. Vance

Personal details
- Born: Anna Elizabeth Wagner; 1979 (age 46–47) Gulfport, Mississippi, U.S.
- Education: Louisiana State University (BA); Columbia University (MA, JD)

Anna Elizabeth Wagner St. John (née Wagner; born 1979) is an American lawyer who has served as a United States district judge of the United States District Court for the Eastern District of Louisiana since 2026 and is a United States circuit judge - designate of the United States Court of Appeals for the Fifth Circuit. She was president and general counsel of the Hamilton Lincoln Law Institute and its Center for Class Action Fairness from 2019 to 2026.

== Early life and education ==
St. John was born Anna Elizabeth Wagner in 1979 in Gulfport, Mississippi. She received her Bachelor of Arts degree in 2001 from Louisiana State University, her Master of Arts degree in 2006 from Columbia Graduate School of Arts and Sciences, and her Juris Doctor in 2006 from Columbia Law School. She clerked for Judge Rhesa Barksdale of the United States Court of Appeals for the Fifth Circuit.

== Career ==
St. John served as president and general counsel of the Hamilton Lincoln Law Institute from 2020 to 2026.

=== Federal judicial service ===
On January 6, 2026, President Donald Trump announced his intention to nominate St. John to an unspecified seat on the United States District Court for the Eastern District of Louisiana. On January 29, 2026, Trump formally nominated St. John to the seat on the Eastern District of Louisiana vacated by Judge Sarah S. Vance. On March 5, 2025, her nomination was reported from the Judiciary Committee by a 12–10 vote. She was confirmed by the U.S. Senate on March 17, 2026, by a 51–45 vote. She received her judicial commission on April 13, 2026.

On June 29, 2026, it was announced that St. John would be nominated to be a judge on the United States Court of Appeals for the Fifth Circuit. On September 24, 2026, her nomination was reported by the Judiciary Committee by a 12–10 vote. On November 17, 2026, she was confirmed by the U.S. Senate by a vote of 52–46.

== Personal life ==
St. John married Scott St. John on January 14, 2006.

Legal offices
Preceded by Sarah S. Vance	Judge of the United States District Court for the Eastern District of Louisiana; 2026–present	Incumbent
