= James Marshall Klebba =

American lawyer and professor of law

James Marshall Klebba is an American lawyer, having been Dean and Victor H. Schiro Professor of Law at Loyola University New Orleans College of Law.
