= Sarah Vance =

Sarah Vance may refer to:

- Sarah S. Vance (born 1950), American judge
- Sarah Vance (politician), American politician from Alaska
