= Jesuit High School (New Orleans) =

High School in New Orleans, Louisiana, United States

- Jesuit High School (2010)

Location
- 4133 Banks Street; New Orleans, Louisiana 70119; United States; 29°58′23.0″N 90°6′12.5″W

Information
- Type: Private, Catholic all-boys college-preparatory educational institution
- Motto: Latin: Ad Majorem Dei Gloriam; English: For the Greater Glory of God
- Religious affiliation: Roman Catholic (Jesuit)
- Established: 1847; 179 years ago (as the College of the Immaculate Conception); 1911; 115 years ago (as Jesuit High School)
- Founder: Jean Baptiste Maisonabe, SJ
- Status: Open
- President: Rev. Fr. John Brown, SJ
- Chairperson: Brian W. North '83
- Director: List: Helen M. Swan, B.S. (Director of Student Affairs); Jonathan E. Hernandez (Director of Admissions); David A. Moreau, B.A. (Director of Athletics); Stephanie C. Strain, B.A. (Director of Guidance); Daniel C. Wagner (Dir. of Information Technology); Scott J. Delatte (Director of Alumni Service Corps); Matthew P. Orillion, M.A. (Director of Student Activities); Roger A. Bacon (Director of Evangelization); Scott J. Delatte (Director of Community Service); Christian Bautista (Dir. of Institutional Advancement); Melissa S. Jurisich (Director of Communications); James M. Linn (Director of Alumni)
- Principal: Dr. Jeremy M. Reuther '01
- Prefect of Discipline: Michael J. Armelin
- Faculty: 119
- Grades: 8–12
- Gender: Male
- Enrollment: 1,287 (2025-2026)
- Average class size: 25
- Student to teacher ratio: 11:1
- Hours in school day: 7
- Campus size: 7 acres (28,000 m^{2})
- Campus type: Urban
- Colors: Blue and white
- Slogan: Men of Faith, Men for Others
- Song: "The Jesuit Alma Mater"
- Fight song: "Jesuit Fight Song: The Blue Jay March"
- Athletics: Baseball, basketball, bowling, cross country, football, golf, lacrosse, powerlifting, rugby, soccer, swimming, tennis, track & field, wrestling
- Athletics conference: LHSAA; Catholic League
Sports
Varsity Sports
- Baseball Basketball Football; Soccer; Bowling; Cross Country Golf	Lacrosse Rugby Swimming Tennis; Track & Field Wrestling
- Mascot: Jayson the Blue Jay
- Nickname: Blue Jays
- Rival: Holy Cross Tigers; Brother Martin Crusaders; Rummel Raiders
- Accreditation: SACS
- Publication: Calliope (literary magazine)
- Newspaper: The Blue Jay
- Yearbook: The Annual
- School fees: $300 (2023–24)
- Tuition: $11,250 (2023–24)
- Graduates: 243 (2025)
- Website: www.jesuitnola.org

Jesuit High School is a private Roman Catholic college-preparatory school for boys in grades eight through twelve. It is located in the Mid-City neighborhood of New Orleans, Louisiana, and is operated by the Society of Jesus (the Jesuits).

The school was founded in 1847 as the College of the Immaculate Conception. In 1911, the school became a separate secondary institution when the college division relocated and later developed into Loyola University New Orleans. Jesuit High School was moved to a new location in 1926.

== History ==
=== Founding and early history ===
The College of the Immaculate Conception was founded in 1847 and opened in 1849. It functioned as both a secondary school and a college. It was located in the Faubourg Sainte Marie neighborhood of New Orleans (now the New Orleans Central Business District), near the French Quarter. The opening of the school was delayed by the 1849 yellow fever epidemic in New Orleans. The school's founder, Jean Baptiste Maisunabe, S.J., succumbed to the disease and was succeeded by John Cambiaso, S.J., who helped oversee the construction and development of the Church of the Immaculate Conception which still stands at the site of the original campus.

=== Move to Carrollton & Banks ===
In 1911, the high school and college divisions were split. The college division (now Loyola University New Orleans) relocated to St. Charles Avenue. The Jesuit High School remained on Baronne Street until 1926, when it was moved to its current location at 4133 Banks Street in Mid-City.

Several additions and renovations have been made to the campus since 1926. In 1953, a wing was added along Palmyra Street, which included an auditorium, the Chapel of the North American Martyrs, a cafeteria, a library, several classrooms, and a band room. In 1957, a gym and recreation center were built across Banks Street to support athletic teams and physical education programs.

A resource center featuring a school library, additional classrooms, and science facilities was built in 1974. In 2001, a new Student Commons was constructed on the first floor beneath the Resource Center. Further renovations were made to the school after Hurricane Katrina in 2005.

In 2012, John Ryan Stadium, a multi-purpose sports stadium primarily used for baseball, was constructed at 100 Blue Jay Way in Metairie, LA, expanding the school into Jefferson Parish.

After Hurricane Maria impacted Puerto Rico in 2017, Jesuit hosted students from Colegio San Ignacio in Puerto Rico.

=== Mascot, colors, and logo ===
The mascot is a blue jay posed with its fists raised, designed by cartoonist Walt Kelly. A contest among students was held to name the mascot in 1954, with the name "Jayson" chosen by the editors of the school paper.

The school’s colors are blue and white, traditionally associated with the Virgin Mary in Catholic symbolism. Student athletes wear a white sweater with a blue letter "J" on it and were referred to as the "Blue J's"—hence the eventual selection of the mascot. As with many Jesuit schools, the school's motto is Ad Majorem Dei Gloriam ("For the Greater Glory of God").

=== Hurricane Katrina ===
Jesuit High School was affected by Hurricane Katrina in August 2005. Up to five feet (1.5 m) of water flooded the school, destroying the ground floor and closing the school temporarily. Jesuit's students and faculty returned to the campus by the end of 2005. On January 23, 2006, 1,285 of the 1,450 students returned to attend Jesuit for the second semester.

=== Recent leadership ===
Fr. Raymond Fitzgerald, S.J. served as school president. He was succeeded by Fr. Anthony McGinn, S.J. In November 2016, Fr. Chris Fronk, S.J. assumed office as the school's president. In January 2020, Fr. Chris Fronk, S.J., stepped down as school president. Fr. John Brown, S.J. became the next president in 2020.

The principal in 2023 was Jeremy Reuther '01.

== History of sexual abuse ==
There have been several instances of child sexual abuse at the school. Multiple lawsuits have alleged sexual abuse by priests, employees, and administrators associated with the school, including incidents reported to have occurred on campus. The Jesuit order confirmed that at least fourteen priests assigned to Jesuit High were accused of sexual abuse.

The school has paid undisclosed settlements to victims and their families. In 2019, a lawsuit against the school's administration accused the school of knowingly hiring a convicted pedophile as head janitor in the 1980s.

In 2018, Jesuit High School president Fr. Chris Fronk, S.J., said he was "horrified" by the sexual abuse at the school dating back to the "disgusting time in our history" of the 1970s.

== Notable alumni ==
In a 1978 article in The Atlantic, James K. Glassman wrote that "practically every white Orleanian of note went to Jesuit." Some notable alumni are:

In chronological order:

- Larry Gilbert (Class of 1910), MLB player (Boston Braves)
- Felix Edward Hebert (Class of 1920), U.S. Congressman (1940–1976)
- Robert B. Landry (Class of 1927), United States military officer
- Hap Glaudi
- Charlie Gilbert (Class of 1937), MLB player (Brooklyn Dodgers, Chicago Cubs, Philadelphia Phillies)
- Fats Dantonio (Class of 1938), MLB player (Brooklyn Dodgers)
- Connie Ryan (Class of 1938), MLB player and manager
- Jimmy Fitzmorris (Class of 1939), Lieutenant Governor of Louisiana (1972–1980)
- Ray Coates (Class of 1944), MVP 1947 Cotton Bowl, member of LSU’s 1946 Southeastern Conference championship baseball team
- Adrian G. Duplantier (Class of 1945), United States federal judge
- Putsy Caballero (Class of 1946), MLB player (Philadelphia Phillies)
- Tookie Gilbert (Class of 1947), MLB player (New York Giants)
- John Petitbon (Class of 1947), Notre Dame and National Football League player
- Donald Wetzel (Class of 1947), inventor of the modern, networked Automated Teller Machine (ATM)
- Buddy Diliberto (Class of 1948), Hall of Fame television and radio sportscaster.
- Moon Landrieu (Class of 1948), Mayor of New Orleans (1970–1978) and Secretary of Housing and Urban Development
- John Grenier (Class of 1948), Alabama attorney and Republican Party figure
- Clyde F. Bel, Jr. (Class of 1951), businessman and state representative for Orleans Parish, 1964–1972 and 1975–1980
- John R. Bourgeois (Class of 1951), served as the 25th director of The President’s Own Marine Band for 17 years.
- Marv Breeding (Class of 1952), MLB player (Baltimore Orioles, Washington Senators, Los Angeles Dodgers)
- John Favalora (Class of 1954), Archbishop of Miami, Florida (1994–2010)
- John Volz (Class of 1954), attorney for United States District Court for the Eastern District of Louisiana
- A. J. McNamara (Class of 1954), member of Louisiana House of Representatives, 1976–1980; judge for U.S. District Court, 1982–2001
- Richie Petitbon (Class of 1955), Tulane University and National Football League player, Washington Redskins head coach
- Rusty Staub (Class of 1961), Major League Baseball player, 6-time All-Star, New York Mets Hall of Fame
- Pat Screen (Class of 1961), state champion 1960, LSU quarterback, Mayor-President of East Baton Rouge Parish (1981–1988)
- Jim Donelon (Class of 1962), Louisiana insurance commissioner
- Jay Thomas (Class of 1966), actor (Eddie LeBec of Cheers, Murphy Brown) and radio personality (Sirius Satellite Radio, Channel 104 M-TH, Channel 101 F)
- Jason Berry (Class of 1967), investigative journalist, book author, and historian
- Jay Zainey (Class of 1969), Federal District Court judge, appointed by President George W. Bush
- Paul Schott Stevens (Class of 1970), attorney, serving on the National Security Council under President Ronald Reagan
- Steve Foley (Class of 1971), NFL player (Denver Broncos)
- Jim Gaudet (Class of 1973), MLB player (Kansas City Royals)
- Christopher Drew (Class of 1974), journalist and book author
- Michael T. Dugan (Class of 1975), educator and accounting scholar
- Ellis Henican (Class of 1976), journalist and voice actor
- Christian LeBlanc (Class of 1976), actor (Michael Baldwin of The Young and the Restless)
- Marc Morial (Class of 1976), Mayor of New Orleans (1994–2002)
- Brett Giroir (Class of 1978), Physician Scientist, Assistant Secretary for Health (2018–2021), former four-star admiral in the U.S. Public Health Service Commissioned Corps
- Mitch Landrieu (Class of 1978), Mayor of New Orleans and Lieutenant Governor of Louisiana
- Dan Clancy (Class of 1981), technologist and computer scientist for NASA & Google, CEO of Twitch
- Fred LeBlanc (Class of 1981), drummer and singer in rock band Cowboy Mouth
- Will Clark (Class of 1982), Major League Baseball player, 6-time All-Star, Gold Glove winner
- Fred Weller (Class of 1984), Broadway and television actor
- Harry Connick, Jr. (Class of 1985), musician, recording artist, actor, and television personality
- Michael Smith (Class of 1989), former NFL wide receiver
- Jay Duplass (Class of 1991), filmmaker
- Cameron Henry (Class of 1992), business analyst and Louisiana state legislator
- David Guas (Class of 1993), celebrity chef, TV personality, restaurateur, and cookbook author
- Mark Duplass (Class of 1995), filmmaker, actor
- Michael White (Class of 1995), men's head basketball coach at the University of Georgia
- Brandon Long (Class of 1995), federal judge for the United States District Court for the Eastern District of Louisiana, former FBI deputy chief of staff
- Walt Leger III (Class of 1996), attorney and state legislator, former Speaker Pro Tempore, Louisiana House of Representatives
- Christian N. Weiler (Class of 1997), tax lawyer
- Corey Hilliard (Class of 2003), football player
- Johnny Giavotella (Class of 2005), second baseman for Kansas City Royals
- Ryan Adams (Class of 2006), MLB player (Baltimore Orioles)
- Ruby (Suicideboys) (Class of 2008) Musical Artist
- Patrick Mullins (Class of 2010), professional soccer player
- Kyle Keller, (Class of 2011), MLB player, currently (Miami Marlins)
- Deion Jones (Class of 2012), linebacker for LSU,
- Tanner Lee (Class of 2013), former quarterback for Jacksonville Jaguars
- Foster Moreau (Class of 2015), tight end for LSU, selected in the fourth round (137th pick overall) in the 2019 NFL draft by the Oakland Raiders

=== Notable students (attended but did not graduate) ===
- Edward Douglass White (Class of 1865), Chief Justice of the United States
- Malcolm John Rebennack, Jr., known by his stage name Dr. John
- Louis Prima (transferred to Warren Easton High School in 1926)
- Alois "Al" Hirt ‘39, trumpeter and entertainer
- Stephen Stills, guitar player with Buffalo Springfield and Crosby, Stills, Nash & Young

== See also ==
- List of Jesuit secondary schools in the United States
