= James August Comiskey =

American judge (1926 – 2005)

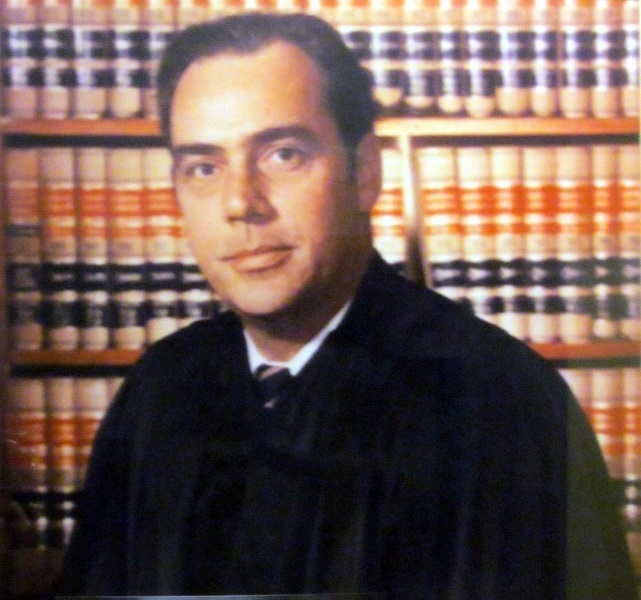

Judge of the United States District Court for the Eastern District of Louisiana
- In office March 4, 1967 – June 15, 1975
- Appointed by: Lyndon B. Johnson
- Preceded by: Seat established by 80 Stat. 75
- Succeeded by: Morey Leonard Sear

Personal details
- Born: James August Comiskey; October 16, 1926 New Orleans, Louisiana, U.S.
- Died: February 1, 2005 (aged 78) New Orleans, Louisiana, U.S.
- Education: Loyola University New Orleans (BA, JD)

James August Comiskey (October 16, 1926 – February 1, 2005) was a United States district judge of the United States District Court for the Eastern District of Louisiana.

== Education and career ==
Born in New Orleans, Louisiana, Comiskey was in the United States Army during World War II, from 1944 to 1946. He received a Bachelor of Arts degree from Loyola University New Orleans in 1949 and a Juris Doctor from Loyola University New Orleans College of Law in 1951. He was in private practice in New Orleans from 1951 to 1967.

== Federal judicial service ==
On January 16, 1967, Comiskey was nominated by President Lyndon B. Johnson to a new seat on the United States District Court for the Eastern District of Louisiana created by 80 Stat. 75. He was confirmed by the United States Senate on March 2, 1967, and received his commission on March 4, 1967. Comiskey served in that capacity until his resignation on June 15, 1975.

== Post judicial service ==
Comiskey was thereafter in private practice in New Orleans until his death in that city on February 1, 2005.

== Sources ==
Legal offices
Preceded by Seat established by 80 Stat. 75	Judge of the United States District Court for the Eastern District of Louisiana; 1967–1975	Succeeded by Morey Leonard Sear
