= Edith Brown Clement =

American judge (born 1948)

Edith Clement
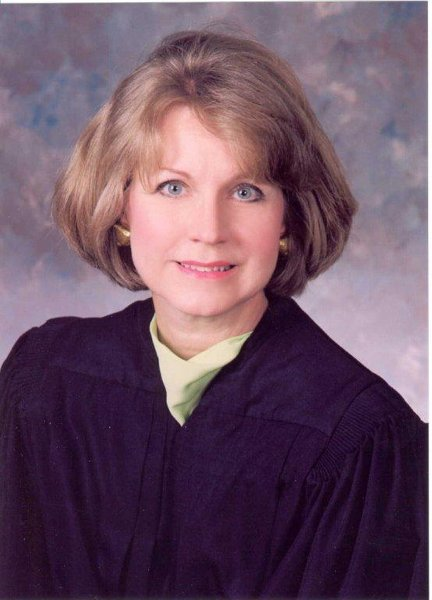

Senior Judge of the United States Court of Appeals for the Fifth Circuit
- Incumbent
- Assumed office May 14, 2018

Judge of the United States Court of Appeals for the Fifth Circuit
- In office November 26, 2001 – May 14, 2018
- Appointed by: George W. Bush
- Preceded by: John M. Duhé Jr.
- Succeeded by: Kurt D. Engelhardt

Chief Judge of the United States District Court for the Eastern District of Louisiana
- In office June 9, 2001 – November 27, 2001
- Preceded by: A. J. McNamara
- Succeeded by: Helen Ginger Berrigan

Judge of the United States District Court for the Eastern District of Louisiana
- In office November 25, 1991 – November 27, 2001
- Appointed by: George H. W. Bush
- Preceded by: Charles Schwartz Jr.
- Succeeded by: Lance Africk

Personal details
- Born: Edith Joy Brown; April 29, 1948 (age 78) Birmingham, Alabama, U.S.
- Party: Republican
- Spouse: Rutledge Clement
- Children: 2
- Education: University of Alabama, Tuscaloosa (BA); Tulane University (JD)

Edith Joy Brown Clement (born April 29, 1948) is a senior United States circuit judge of the United States Court of Appeals for the Fifth Circuit, based in New Orleans, Louisiana.

== Early life and education ==
Clement was born on April 29, 1948, in Birmingham, Alabama, the daughter of Erskine John Brown and the former Edith Burrus. In 1969, she received a Bachelor of Arts degree from the University of Alabama at Tuscaloosa. In 1972, she obtained a Juris Doctor from the Tulane University Law School in New Orleans. From 1973 to 1975, she clerked for Judge Herbert W. Christenberry at the United States District Court for the Eastern District of Louisiana (1973–1975), after which she worked as a maritime attorney in private practice in New Orleans until 1991.

== Federal judicial service ==
On October 1, 1991, President George H. W. Bush nominated Clement to the United States District Court for the Eastern District of Louisiana, also in New Orleans. She was confirmed by the Senate on November 21, 1991 by a unanimous consent. She received her commission on November 25, 1991. In 2001 she served as chief judge of this court, before being nominated to the Fifth Circuit. Her service as a district court judge was terminated on November 27, 2001 when she was elevated to the court of appeals.

Clement was nominated on September 4, 2001 by President George W. Bush to fill a seat vacated by Judge John M. Duhé Jr., who assumed Senior status. President Bill Clinton in 1999 had nominated Louisiana lawyer Alston Johnson to that seat on the Fifth Circuit, but the United States Senate never held a hearing or took a vote on Johnson's nomination. Clement was confirmed by the Senate on November 13, 2001 by a 99–0 vote. She received her commission on November 26, 2001. In September 2017, Judge Clement stated that she would assume senior status upon the confirmation of her successor. She assumed senior status on May 14, 2018.

She criticized her liberal colleagues James L. Dennis and Gregg Costa in a dissent on March 22, 2019, regarding a racist gerrymandering case. She said that the plaintiffs only won because the panel happened to have 2 liberal Democratic appointees on it. Clement also slammed a "majority-minority panel", suggesting that the 5th Circuit's conservative majority would reverse the holding if en banc were granted.

=== Notable opinions ===
Clement has a reputation as a conservative jurist and a strict constructionist who strongly supports principles of federalism.

She wrote for the majority in Vogler v. Blackmore, reducing pain and suffering damages awarded by a jury to a mother and daughter who were killed in a car accident. The basis of her ruling was the lack of specific evidence about the daughter's "awareness of the impending collision." Large damage awards to the father and husband due to the loss of society in his wife and daughter were affirmed.

In Chiu v. Plano Independent School District, Clement held that a school district's policy requiring the preapproval of fliers handed out at a school event violated the First Amendment free speech rights of would-be protestors.

In United States v. Harris, Clement again wrote for the majority, this time reinstating the sentence of a police captain convicted for violation of federal civil rights laws in using excessive force. The captain moved to vacate, arguing that his counsel had been insufficient. Clement and the court held that the representation had been reasonable.

Clement wrote a unanimous opinion for the 5th Circuit in Tarver v. City of Edna. She upheld officers' appeal of qualified immunity for reasonably arresting a father who was interfering with the return of a child to its rightful custodian. Qualified immunity also protected officers from the plaintiff's accusation of excessive force in using handcuffs and confining him to the police car as part of the arrest. Officers also, however, slammed the car door on his foot and head, and the plaintiff's excessive force claim under this heading was remanded.

Clement has joined other conservative judges in dissenting in Commerce Clause cases that implicate federalism. In U.S. v. McFarland, she argued that the Commerce Clause power did not enable Congress to regulate local robberies. In GDF Realty Investments, Ltd. v. Norton Clement argued that the Endangered Species Act needed a commercial nexus to enable regulation of endemic rare species.

In 2010, Clement joined Judges Garza and Owen in affirming the dismissal of the complaint in Doe v. Silsbee Independent School District. The plaintiff ("H.S.") was a cheerleader who was ordered by her high school to cheer for her sexual assaulter, a basketball player named Rakheem Bolton. H.S. refused and was kicked off the team. She sued, claiming a violation of her First Amendment right to free speech. The Eastern District of Texas, Judge Thad Heartfield, granted the school district's motion to dismiss, and Judges Clement, Garza, and Owen affirmed. H.S. was ordered to pay the school $45,000 in legal fees for filing a "frivolous" lawsuit.

In 2025, Clement, and Judges Engelhardt and Wilson, upheld in part the jury verdict against Southwest Airlines in Carter v. Local 556 for discriminating against a flight attendant's religious practice without providing an accommodation. Clement wrote for the panel that "the jury instruction’s delineation of Southwest’s burden at the time does not amount to reversible error because it nevertheless stated an undue hardship must amount to more than a de minimis cost, encompassing the possibility of cost to Southwest’s business operations from changes in employee morale." The panel, however, reversed the jury's finding that Southwest Airlines discriminated against the flight attendant's religious beliefs. Separately, the district court previously had held Southwest Airlines in contempt for failing to notify its flight attendants of the jury's judgment as directed. Clement wrote that "[i]nforming employees that their employer does not discriminate is indeed different from informing employees their employer is legally prohibited from discriminating again." However, the panel vacated the district court's contempt order, which required Southwest's attorneys to attend religious liberty training at Alliance Defending Freedom, by noting that "when a court’s contempt sanction in a civil matter is both overbroad in scope and undoubtedly punitive in nature, the judiciary risks appearing contemptuous like the contemnor."

== Possible Supreme Court nomination ==
In July 2005, after Supreme Court Justice Sandra Day O'Connor announced her retirement, Clement was regarded in the press as the frontrunner to succeed her, though President Bush ultimately selected John Roberts for the seat. Following the death of Chief Justice William Rehnquist in September 2005, and Bush eventually nominating Roberts for the Chief Justice position instead, Clement was again mentioned as a possible choice to fill the vacant Associate Justice seat, or for Chief Justice if Bush did not alter Roberts' nomination. Much of this speculation was because Clement is a conservative woman with a limited paper trail on controversial issues. Eventually, Bush chose White House Counsel Harriet Miers as his nominee to succeed O'Connor, but after Miers withdrew her nomination, some sources reported that Clement was still a potential choice for the seat, though others reported she was out of consideration; Judge Samuel Alito was ultimately confirmed to O'Connor's seat.

== Personal life ==
Clement and her husband, Rutledge, have two children. Rutledge Clement was a noted lawyer in New Orleans until having a near-fatal stroke in the mid-1990s, though by 2005, he had recovered his abilities to drive and speak.

== See also ==
- George W. Bush Supreme Court candidates

Legal offices
Preceded by Charles Schwartz Jr.	Judge of the United States District Court for the Eastern District of Louisiana; 1991–2001	Succeeded by Lance Africk
Preceded by A. J. McNamara	Chief Judge of the United States District Court for the Eastern District of Louisiana; 2001	Succeeded by Helen Ginger Berrigan
Preceded by John M. Duhé Jr.	Judge of the United States Court of Appeals for the Fifth Circuit; 2001–2018	Succeeded by Kurt D. Engelhardt
