= Nannette Jolivette Brown =

American judge (born 1963)

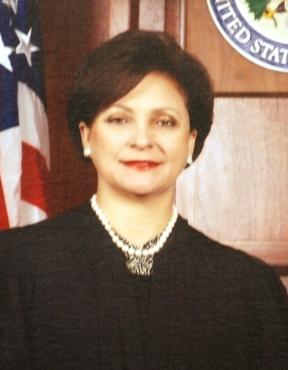

Chief Judge of the United States District Court for the Eastern District of Louisiana
- In office May 15, 2018 – May 15, 2025
- Preceded by: Kurt D. Engelhardt
- Succeeded by: Wendy Vitter

Judge of the United States District Court for the Eastern District of Louisiana
- Incumbent
- Assumed office October 4, 2011
- Appointed by: Barack Obama
- Preceded by: Stanwood Duval

Personal details
- Born: Nannette V. Jolivette; November 19, 1963 (age 62) Lafayette, Louisiana, U.S.
- Spouse: Marcus Brown
- Children: 2
- Education: University of Louisiana at Lafayette (BA); Tulane University (JD, LLM)

Nannette Jolivette Brown (née Jolivette; born November 19, 1963) is a United States district judge of the United States District Court for the Eastern District of Louisiana. She previously served in the role of city attorney for the city of New Orleans from the time that Mayor Mitch Landrieu hired her in May 2010 until becoming a federal judge in 2011. As city attorney, Brown was responsible for all city contracts and oversaw all legal matters for the city.

== Early life and education ==
Brown received a Bachelor of Arts degree from University of Southwestern Louisiana in 1985, and then attended Tulane Law School, where she received a Juris Doctor in 1988 and a Master of Laws in Energy and Environment in 1998.

== Career ==
From 1988 to 1992, Brown practiced corporate and environmental litigation at the New Orleans office of the firm of Adams & Reese LLP, From 1996 to 1998 she was working for the Onebane Law Firm. From 2000 to 2003, Brown was employed by Milling, Benson, Woodward LLP. Between 2004 and 2007, she practiced at the firm Chaffe McCall LLP and again with this firm from 2009 until 2010. From 2007 to 2009, she was a visiting assistant clinical professor at Loyola University New Orleans College of Law.

=== Federal judicial service ===
Brown was nominated to fill the seat of Judge Stanwood Duval by President Barack Obama on March 2, 2011. The United States Senate confirmed her by unanimous consent on October 3, 2011. She received her judicial commission the following day and became the first African-American woman judge on the court. She became Chief Judge on May 15, 2018, after Kurt D. Engelhardt was appointed to the United States Court of Appeals for the Fifth Circuit.Brown became the first African American Chief Judge in the court's history.

== See also ==
- List of African-American federal judges
- List of African-American jurists
- List of first women lawyers and judges in Louisiana

Legal offices
Preceded by Stanwood Duval	Judge of the United States District Court for the Eastern District of Louisiana; 2011–present	Incumbent
Preceded by Kurt D. Engelhardt	Chief Judge of the United States District Court for the Eastern District of Louisiana; 2018–2025	Succeeded by Wendy Vitter
