= Loyola University School of Law =

Loyola University School of Law may refer to more than one entry of Jesuit law school:

- Loyola University New Orleans College of Law
- Loyola University Chicago School of Law
- Loyola Law School, at Loyola Marymount University in Los Angeles
