= Judge Boyle =

Judge Boyle may refer to:

- Edward James Boyle Sr. (1913–2002), judge of the United States District Court for the Eastern District of Louisiana
- Francis J. Boyle (1927–2006), judge of the United States District Court for the District of Rhode Island
- Jane J. Boyle (born 1954), judge of the United States District Court for the Northern District of Texas
- John Boyle (congressman) (1774–1834), judge of the United States District Court for the District of Kentucky
- Patricia Boyle (1937–2014), judge of the United States District Court for the Eastern District of Michigan
- Terrence Boyle (born 1945), judge of the United States District Court for the Eastern District of North Carolina
