= Wendy Vitter =

American judge (born 1961)

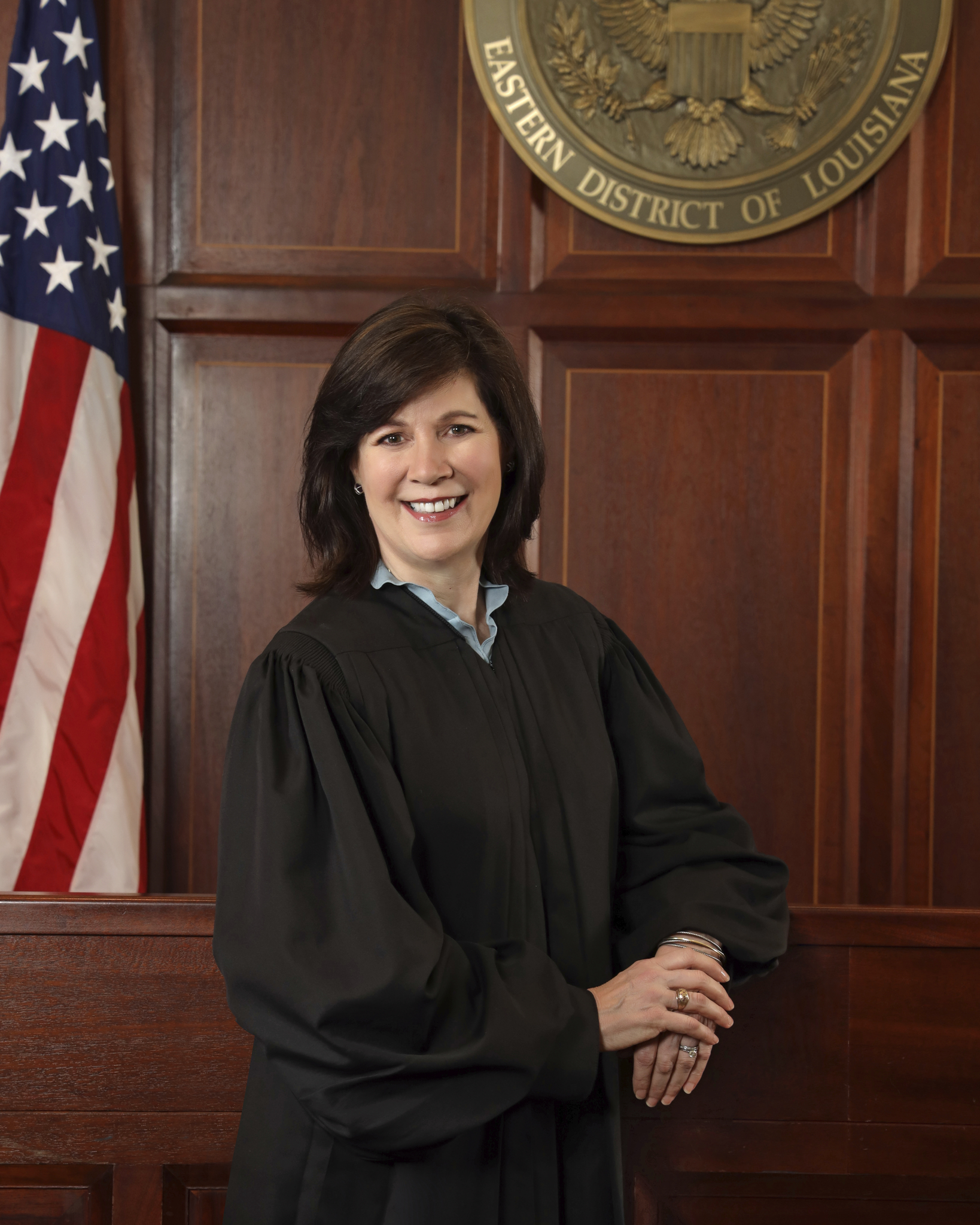
- Official portrait, 2024

Chief Judge of the United States District Court for the Eastern District of Louisiana
- Incumbent
- Assumed office May 15, 2025
- Preceded by: Nannette Jolivette Brown

Judge of the United States District Court for the Eastern District of Louisiana
- Incumbent
- Assumed office May 29, 2019
- Appointed by: Donald Trump
- Preceded by: Helen Ginger Berrigan

Personal details
- Born: Wendy Lee Freret Baldwin; 1961 (age 64–65) New Orleans, Louisiana, U.S.
- Party: Republican
- Spouse: David Vitter (m. 1990)
- Children: 4
- Education: Sam Houston State University (BA); Tulane University (JD)

Wendy Baldwin Vitter (née Baldwin; born 1961) is the chief United States district judge of the United States District Court for the Eastern District of Louisiana.

== Education ==
Vitter earned a Bachelor of Arts from Sam Houston State University and a Juris Doctor from Tulane University Law School.

== Career ==
Upon graduation from law school, she served as a law clerk in the Orleans Parish District Attorney's office and eventually rose to chief of the felony trials division. There, she prosecuted over 100 jury trials, primarily homicide cases. Former New Orleans District Attorney Harry Connick Sr. called Vitter "honest, impartial and an outstanding legal scholar with plenty of courtroom experience." Later she practiced at a boutique litigation firm specializing in maritime law and other matters.

Vitter worked as the General Counsel of the Roman Catholic Archdiocese of New Orleans from 2012 to 2019, representing the body in all legal matters.

=== Federal judicial service ===
On January 23, 2018, Donald Trump nominated Vitter to the seat on the United States District Court for the Eastern District of Louisiana vacated by Judge Helen Ginger Berrigan, who assumed senior status on August 23, 2016. A "substantial majority" of the American Bar Association, which evaluates candidates for the federal bench, rated Vitter with its "qualified" rating, with a minority of those who participated in the process rating her as "unqualified." Vitter's judicial nomination was endorsed by then-mayor of New Orleans, Democrat Mitch Landrieu; New Orleans District Attorney Leon A. Cannizzaro Jr.; and former New Orleans District Attorney Harry Connick Sr. Vitter's judicial nomination has been opposed by the liberal judicial advocacy group the Alliance for Justice. On April 11, 2018, a hearing on her nomination was held before the Senate Judiciary Committee. During her hearing before the Judiciary Committee, Vitter was questioned by Democrats about her previous anti-abortion and anti-birth control advocacy. In her position as general counsel of the Roman Catholic Archdiocese of New Orleans, Vitter had promoted claims about health dangers linked to the birth control pill. During her Senate hearing, Vitter distanced herself from these claims and promised to uphold Roe v. Wade. Senator Richard Blumenthal asked Vitter whether she thought Brown v. Board of Education was "correctly decided," and she declined to answer, saying "I don't mean to be coy, but I think I can get into a difficult, difficult area when I start commenting on Supreme Court decisions – which are correctly decided and which I may disagree with. Again my personal, political or religious views I would set aside – that is Supreme Court precedent. It is binding. If I were honored to be confirmed, I would be bound by it and of course, I would uphold it." She further stated "It's very easy to see Plessy v. Ferguson and to read Justice Harlan's dissent which of course became the basis for Brown v. Board of Education and to look at that and say well that sounds very obvious to us now in 2018, that that was the right decision, but that's hindsight, I have the benefit of that hindsight." She stated that "she didn't think she should comment on which cases she agreed with for fear of starting down a slippery slope." According to CNN , "Judicial conservatives argued Vitter had declined to answer the Brown question because she believes that judges should maintain their impartiality by declining to put forward personal opinions on particular cases." In written follow-up questions submitted after her hearing, Vitter said "I do not believe that racial segregation in schools is constitutional." On May 24, 2018 her nomination was reported out of committee by an 11–10 vote.

On January 3, 2019, her nomination was returned to the President under Rule XXXI, Paragraph 6 of the United States Senate. On January 23, 2019, President Trump announced his intent to renominate Vitter for a federal judgeship. Her nomination was sent to the Senate later that day. On February 7, 2019, her nomination was reported out of committee by a 12–10 vote. On May 15, 2019, the Senate invoked cloture on her nomination by a 51–45 vote, with Senator Susan Collins being the only Republican voted against the motion to invoke cloture on her nomination. On May 16, 2019, her nomination was confirmed by a 52–45 vote. She received her judicial commission on May 29, 2019. She became Chief Judge on May 15, 2025.

In July 2026, Vitter delayed the fraud trial of former New Orleans mayor Latoya Cantrell and Cantrell's reported lover Jeffrey Vappie from October 2026 to March 2027, alleging an "arduous trial schedule."

== Personal life ==
She is married to former U.S. Senator David Vitter, with whom she has four children. The Vitters reside in Metairie, Louisiana. Vitter predicted in 2000 that she would act more like Lorena Bobbitt than Hillary Clinton, if her husband strayed, saying, "If he does something like that, I'm walking away with one thing, and it's not alimony, trust me." In 2007, Vitter stood by her husband and publicly stated her support for him after he admitted to and apologized for involvement with an escort service.

== See also ==
- Donald Trump judicial appointment controversies

Legal offices
Preceded by Helen Ginger Berrigan	Judge of the United States District Court for the Eastern District of Louisiana; 2019–present	Incumbent
Preceded by Nannette Jolivette Brown	Chief Judge of the United States District Court for the Eastern District of Louisiana; 2025–present	Incumbent
