= Michael Smith (wide receiver) =

American football player (born 1970)

No. 83
- Position: Wide receiver

Personal information
- Born: November 21, 1970 (age 55); New Orleans, Louisiana, U.S.
- Listed height: 5 ft 8 in (1.73 m)
- Listed weight: 160 lb (73 kg)

Career information
- High school: Jesuit (New Orleans)
- College: Kansas State (1988–1991)
- NFL draft: 1992: undrafted

Career history
- Kansas City Chiefs (1992)
- Stats at Pro Football Reference

Michael Charles Smith Jr. (born November 21, 1970) is an American former professional football player who was a wide receiver for the Kansas City Chiefs of the National Football League (NFL). He played college football for the Kansas State Wildcats.

Born in 1970 in New Orleans, Smith attended Jesuit High School in that city. He played college football at Kansas State University from 1988 to 1991. He set all-time Kansas State receiving records with 179 receptions in 43 games for 2,457 yards and 11 receiving touchdowns. He received third-team All-America honors in both 1990 and 1991. He also played professional football in the NFL for the Kansas City Chiefs in 1992, appearing in two games.
