= Lance Africk =

American judge (born 1951)

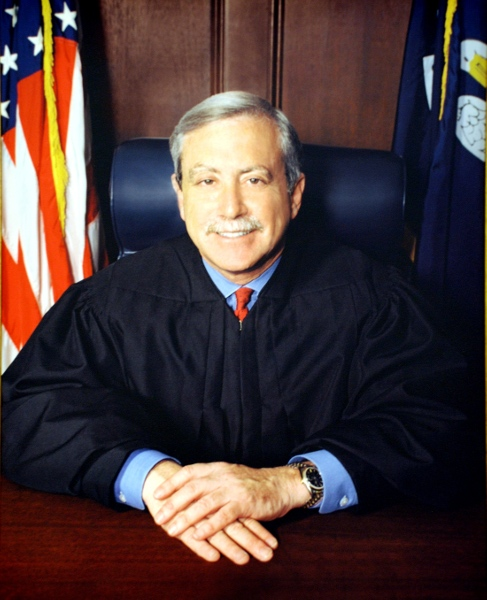

Senior Judge of the United States District Court for the Eastern District of Louisiana
- Incumbent
- Assumed office October 1, 2024

Judge of the United States District Court for the Eastern District of Louisiana
- In office April 17, 2002 – October 1, 2024
- Appointed by: George W. Bush
- Preceded by: Edith Brown Clement
- Succeeded by: vacant

Magistrate Judge of the United States District Court for the Eastern District of Louisiana
- In office 1990–2002

Personal details
- Born: Lance Michael Africk; December 1, 1951 (age 74) New York City, New York, U.S.
- Party: Republican (prior to 1993, 2001-present); Democrat (1993–2001)
- Education: University of North Carolina (BA, JD)

Lance Michael Africk (born December 1, 1951) is a senior United States district judge for the United States District Court for the Eastern District of Louisiana.

== Education and career ==
The New York City-born Africk received a Bachelor of Arts from the University of North Carolina at Chapel Hill in 1973, and two years later a Juris Doctor from the University of North Carolina School of Law. From 1975 to 1976, he was a law clerk to James Gulotta, a judge of the Louisiana 4th Circuit Court of Appeals. He entered the private practice of law in Louisiana from 1976 to 1977, and was thereafter Director of the Career Criminal Bureau for the Orleans Parish District Attorney's Office from 1977 to 1980. He returned to private practice until 1982, and then became an Assistant United States Attorney for the United States District Court for the Eastern District of Louisiana until 1990. In 1986, he began teaching as an instructor at the University of New Orleans.

=== Federal judicial service ===
Africk became a United States magistrate judge for the United States District Court for the Eastern District of Louisiana in 1990. After the election of Bill Clinton in 1992, Africk changed his party affiliation from Republican to Democrat. He did not obtain nomination for a judgeship under Clinton. On January 23, 2002, by which time he had returned to Republican registration, Africk was nominated by President George W. Bush to a seat on the United States District Court for the Eastern District of Louisiana vacated by Edith Brown Clement. He was confirmed by the United States Senate on April 17, 2002, and received his commission the same day. He assumed senior status on October 1, 2024. More conservative Republicans opposed Bush's selection of Africk, whose past Democratic affiliation caused them discomfiture; the publication Gambit Weekly reported that shipbuilder Donald Thomas "Boysie" Bollinger of Lockport in Lafourche Parish, a major GOP donor and the son of former party chairman Donald G. Bollinger, was the driving force behind the Africk nomination.

=== Notable case ===
On March 31, 2011, Africk sentenced former New Orleans police officer David Warren to 25 years and 9 months in federal prison on a federal civil rights violation of committing manslaughter with a firearm in the case of the death of Henry Glover. Africk sentenced another former officer, Greg McRae, to 17 years and 3 months in prison and three years of supervised release on obstruction of justice and another civil rights charge. "Henry Glover was not at the strip mall to commit suicide. He was there to retrieve some baby clothing. You killed a man. Despite your tendentious arguments to the contrary, it was no mistake," Africk told Warren.

On December 17, 2012, the Fifth Circuit vacated Warren's conviction and one of the convictions related to McRae, ordering new trials on those charges. The three-judge panel found, among other concerns, that the trials of the two men should have been conducted separately. In 2013, Warren was acquitted.

In 2014, Africk resentenced McRae to the same punishment. He dismissed calls for leniency on the grounds of Warren's acquittal, calling it "irrelevant." He said McRae's crime was separate and should be punished individually.

"You did not merely burn a corpse, you, a law enforcement officer, burned a corpse to obstruct justice."

In 2015, McRae was granted a resentencing hearing after his obstruction of justice conviction was overturned entirely. In 2016, Africk reduced McRae's sentence to 11 years and nine months, which was within the federal guidelines. However, he rejected calls for a greater reduction on the grounds that McRae was mentally disturbed at the time of the crime. He said a long prison sentence was still warranted due to the severity of the crime.

"The facts behind your conviction deal with much more than the burning of an automobile. By hiding behind a blue wall of silence, you were hiding the truth."

== Other interests ==
Africk served as the 54th president of the Sugar Bowl Committee in 2011–2012, and oversaw the game in which the University of Michigan Wolverines defeated Virginia Tech in an overtime win. Thereafter he helped in the presentation of the Sugar Bowl Trophy to Brady Hoke and the Wolverines team.

== Notes ==
Legal offices
Preceded by Edith Brown Clement	Judge of the United States District Court for the Eastern District of Louisiana; 2002–2024	Vacant
