= John Volz =

American lawyer (1935–2011)

John Volz, Sr.

United States Attorney for the Eastern District of Louisiana
- In office 1978–1991
- President: Jimmy Carter; Ronald Reagan; George H. W. Bush
- Preceded by: Gerald J. Gallinghouse
- Succeeded by: Harry A. Rosenberg

Personal details
- Born: April 22, 1935 New Orleans, Louisiana, USA
- Died: February 12, 2011 (aged 75) Tulsa, Oklahoma
- Party: Democratic-turned-Republican
- Spouse: Daisy Volz
- Children: John Volz, Jr.
- Education: Jesuit High School Tulane University Tulane University Law School
- Occupation: Attorney

John P. Volz, Sr. (April 22, 1935 – February 12, 2011) was a prominent lawyer from New Orleans, Louisiana. He was the attorney for the United States District Court for the Eastern District of Louisiana under President Jimmy Carter, a Democrat, and Presidents Ronald W. Reagan and George Herbert Walker Bush, both Republicans.

Volz was chosen as U.S. attorney in 1977 after the initial choice, George W. Reese, Jr., of New Orleans, a former Republican national committeeman, withdrew from consideration after the Federal Bureau of Investigation came forward with "allegations" of his drinking, gambling, and procurement of a loan from a financial institution with mob ties.

Volz in time prosecuted reputed Mafia figure Carlos Marcello, Louisiana commissioner of administration Charles E. Roemer, II, Orleans Parish District Attorney Harry Connick Sr., Louisiana State Senate President Michael H. O'Keefe, Sr., and Governor Edwin Washington Edwards.

In 1995, Volz, running as a Republican, finished third in a crowded nonpartisan blanket primary for sheriff of suburban St. Tammany Parish outside New Orleans. In 1996, failed in a bid to oust Walter Reed as district attorney in the 22nd Judicial District, which covers St. Tammany and Washington parishes.

Volz died in Tulsa, Oklahoma, where he had been an administrative law judge for several years until forced to retire on December 31, 2010, because of failing health. His widow, Daisy Volz, said that he would be interred in New Orleans.
