= Jimmy Kuhn =

American lawyer

Louisiana First Circuit Court of Appeal
- In office 1994–2014

Louisiana 21st Judicial District Judge
- In office 1990–1994

Personal details
- Party: Republican
- Education: Southeastern Louisiana University; Loyola Law School

Military service
- Branch/service: Army National Guard

James Edward Kuhn (born October 31, 1946) is a former member of the Louisiana Circuit Courts of Appeal First Circuit. Kuhn lives in Ponchatoula, Louisiana. He began his second term in 2005. He retired when his 10-year term ended on December 31, 2014.

== Education ==
Kuhn was graduated from Ponchatoula High School in 1964 and from Southeastern Louisiana University in 1968 and then Loyola Law School. He served in the Army National Guard and attended the Army War College National Security Seminar at Carlisle Barracks, Pennsylvania.

== Legal career ==
Kuhn began his career in private practice and was a State Prosecutor for 17 years. He was elected to Louisiana's 21st Judicial District Court in 1990 and was there until his term on the First Circuit Appeals Court of Louisiana, to which he was elected in 1994. Kuhn has been part of the faculty at Southeastern Louisiana University since 1991. He has lectured before the Association of Defense Counsel and the National Institute of Trial Advocacy.

== 2008 election ==
Kuhn ran for the first district seat on the Louisiana Supreme Court made vacant by the retirement of Pascal Calogero. On Saturday, October 4, Kuhn won 30 percent of the vote in a 3-way primary, coming in second in a race against Greg Guidry and Roland Belsome; the race was then between Kuhn and Guidry, both Republicans, and was decided on November 4. On November 4, 2008 Greg G. Guidry won a seat on the Supreme Court with 160,893 votes (60%) to Jimmy Kuhn's 108,541 (40%) with all precincts reporting.

== Judicial philosophy ==
In explaining his views to Louisiana's voters, Kuhn has said:

- He advocates a philosophy of judicial restraint.
- He hopes to protect the court from political influence: "The court is under attack from groups who want to make it strictly a political contest rather than what's best for the court system in this state. Whether they are from the right or the left, they are on a mission for this, and it's no-holds-barred."
- He does not support public financing for judicial races.
- The state's judicial systems needs to increase the qualifications of candidates for judicial office in the state, and improve the way judicial elections are run.
- The Louisiana Supreme Court needs to "more vigorously supervise" the state's intermediate appellate courts in the wake of recent revelations that between February 1994 and May 2007, appeals filed in the 5th Circuit by prisoners without attorneys were not reviewed by three-judge panels as the law requires.

== Case summaries ==
=== Published opinions ===
- Carter v. State Farm Mutual Insurance Co., 2007-0583 (La. App. 1st Cir. --/--/--), 2008 WL --------- Majority upholds trial court's denial of summary judgment, finding that a waiver of uninsured/underinsured motorists (UM) coverage was invalid and, therefore, that Imperial Fire and Casualty Co. (Imperial) provided coverage. Judge Kuhn dissented, stating "[Imperial] has carried its evidentiary burden of proof to establish the absence of genuine issues of material fact and is entitled to judgment as matter of law that the [UM] Rejection Form was properly completed and UM coverage was waived. The evidence establishes that no policy number was available at the time of execution of the form at issue. LIRC 98-03 specifically provides '[I]n the case where a policy number is not available, the space for the policy number may be left blank or a binder number may be inserted." On appeal, the Supreme Court reversed the majority "for the reasons assigned by the dissenting judge." See Carter v. State Farm Mutual Insurance Co., 2007-1974 (La. 10/5/07), 964 So.2d 375.
- Crummey v. Morgan, 2007-0087 (La. App. 1st Cir. 8/8/07), 965 So.2d 497, writ denied, 2007-1806 (La. 11/9/07), 967 So.2d 509 - A Louisiana resident learned of the availability of a recreational vehicle (RV) from the Texas defendants through the eBay website. The Texas defendants urged that the Louisiana court lacked jurisdiction to hear the Louisiana resident's claims that the RV he had purchased from them was defective. Held: The Texas defendants entered into the contract to sell the allegedly-defective RV to a Louisiana resident utilizing eBay, which greatly expanded their market. The Texas defendants secured the sale with a credit card sent from Louisiana. The Louisiana resident spoke to the Texas defendants on the phone while he was in his residence in Louisiana. Therefore, the Louisiana district court had sufficient minimum contacts to maintain personal jurisdiction. "To hold to the contrary would have a chilling effect on e-commerce in that buyers, wary of being haled into the home courts of out-of-state sellers, will refrain from purchasing goods on eBay and other similar websites should the merchandise they considered purchasing be defective.
- Fernandez v. Hebert, 2006-1558 (La. App. 1st Cir. 5/4/07), 961 So.2d 404, writ denied, 2007-1123 (La. 9/21/07), 964 So.2d 333 - Decedent was an elderly widow who left no children. Her will, which mirrored that of her late husband, left numerous legacies to her nephew and his siblings. Her nephew had worked alongside her late husband at a wholesale malt beverage distributorship for nearly 40 years and had become a partial owner of the distributorship at the time of decedent's death. Nephew's cousin, who had an interest in the decedent's estate as a residuary legatee, challenged, among other things, the nephew's authority to make donations of stock to himself and his siblings, on behalf of decedent prior to her death. The cousin claimed that the nephew needed the decedent's written authority to make the donations. The First Circuit applied the Civil Code and the Louisiana Stock Transfer Law to hold that the express authority granted to the nephew by the decedent to make the stock donations to himself and his siblings did not have to be written. Therefore, in light of the evidence admitted at the hearing, there was no legal error in the conclusion that the donations were valid despite the lack of written authorization.
- Hogan v. Morgan, 2006-0808 (La. App. 1st Cir. 4/26/07), 960 So.2d 1024, writ denied, 2007-1122 (La. 9/14/07), 963 So.2d 1000 - Plaintiff had sustained injuries to his upper back, shoulders, and cervical spine in a 2001 car crash. He sued, among others, his uninsured/underinsured motorists (UM) provider to recover damages from the crash. The UM provider sent plaintiff to defendant, a doctor, to conduct an independent medical evaluation (IME) of plaintiff. The trial court's order permitting the IME expressly limited defendant's examination to plaintiff's upper body. Neither the doctor nor his staff reviewed the court order prior to the IME, in which he conducted a routine orthopedic and neurological examination of plaintiff's entire body. Although plaintiff commented once or twice that defendant was not supposed to go below his shoulders, he allowed the doctor to complete the full examination. Plaintiff then filed this lawsuit against the doctor, seeking damages for mental and physical injuries. Held: The record provided no support for a finding that the doctor committed a battery upon plaintiff. Further, the record does not support a finding that the doctor's conduct while performing the IME was unreasonable or that it seriously interfered with plaintiff's privacy interest such that it amounted to an actionable invasion of privacy. Thus, the trial court's award of damages to plaintiff was reversed.
- Girard v. Patterson State Bank, 2006-0049 (La. App. 1st Cir. 11/3/06), 950 So.2d 703, writ denied, 2006-2792 (La. 1/26/07), 948 So.2d 173 - The issue before the First Circuit was whether a loan servicing clerk of a bank, who was injured the inaccurate placement of a needle into her arm by a phlebotomist drawing blood, was entitled to workers' compensation benefits. Finding that the bank demonstrated through evidence that the employee's attendance was not mandatory and that the bank simply permitted the mobile blood unit to park on its premises without deriving any benefit designed to further the bank's purposes, the clerk's claim for benefits was denied.
- Samuels v. Goodwin, 2005-2131 (La. App. 1st Cir. 11/3/06), 950 So.2d 736 - A prisoner sued the State seeking to limit the methods by which he was required to give a sample for the State's DNA database to use of a buccal swab. Held: Because the undisputed facts showed that the State did not have to employ reasonable force to obtain the DNA sample from the prisoner, its decision to collect the sample by the drawing of blood was permitted under the law. Thus, the district court's conclusion limiting collection to use of a buccal swab was reversed.
- In Re: Ark-La-Tex Antique and Classic Vehicles, Inc., 2005-1931 (La. App. 1st Cir. 9/15/06), writ denied, 2006-2509 (La. 1/12/07), 948 So.2d 151 - Public employee with an interest in a non-profit car museum and the limited liability company (LLC) that owned it was subjected to conflicts of interest provisions of the Code of Governmental Ethics (the Code). When the museum accepted funds for another company's use of the museum to run a gin rummy tournament, the museum violated the conflict of interest provisions of the Code. The public employee was in a position with a potential for undue influence based on LLC-owner's acceptance of monthly lease proceeds from other company, which also did business with the public employee in his capacity as a public employee. The First Circuit affirms the Board of Ethics conclusion that the museum and the LLC-owner violated the Code and its imposition of civil penalties.

=== Notable criminal law opinions ===
- State v. Ballard 97-0233 (La. App. 1st Cir. 7/14/98), 718 So.2d 521, in an en banc determination, with Judge Kuhn writing, the First Circuit ruled that the employment of police officer did not automatically imply bias of officer, so as to preclude him from serving on jury. On review, the Supreme Court expressly overruling the broad pronouncement of its earlier decision in State v. Simmons, 390 So.2d 1317, which had held "an actively employed criminal deputy sheriff is not a competent criminal juror." In reaching its conclusion, the Supreme Court noted, "Law enforcement officers are sworn to uphold the laws of the state, which laws include the provision of a fair trial to each and every defendant. If a law enforcement officer testifies under oath during voir dire that he can be a fair and impartial juror, the trial judge has the discretion to determine whether that officer is speaking the truth. The disqualification of all law enforcement officers from service on a jury disregards whether or not the judge, whose rulings on challenges for cause are given great deference in all other instances, accepts the officer as a fair and impartial juror. We find that such a disqualification amounts to an irrebuttable presumption of untrustworthiness in law enforcement officers and is an affront to police officers in this state." Thus, the First Circuit's determination was affirmed. See State v. Ballard, 98-2198 (La. 10/19/99), 747 So.2d 1077.
- State v. Jones, 2003-1345 (La. App. 1st Cir. 9/24/04), 888 So.2d 885 – A divided First Circuit en banc court upheld the trial court's conviction of a defendant for a fourth offense DWI. Writing in a separate concurrence, Judge Kuhn addressed the posture of the dissenting opinion, which maintained that the Supreme Court's holding in State v. Smith, 367 So.2d 857 (La. 1979), required the First Circuit, on its own motion, to find that the verdict rendered by a twelve-person jury constituted patent error. Pointing out that the defendant, who was entitled to a jury before six people, had been tried by a twelve-person jury created no prejudice and did not infringe defendant's due process safeguards. Judge Kuhn emphasized the lack of prejudice because the twelve-person jury had rendered a unanimous verdict. Reviewing the First Circuit's affirmance of the conviction, the Supreme Court affirmed, holding that the defendant's conviction by a unanimous twelve-person jury, rather than by jury of six persons as required by state constitution, was subject to harmless error analysis and that the defendant's conviction by unanimous jury of 12 persons was harmless error beyond reasonable doubt. The Supreme Court also held that the empanelling of jury composed of a greater number of persons than constitutionally required did not constitute a non-waivable jurisdictional defect subject to automatic nullity and abrogated its earlier decision in State v. Smith, 367 So.2d 857 (among other decisions). See State v. Jones, 2005-0226 (La. 2/22/06), 922 So.2d 508.
- State v. Price, 2005-2514 (La. App. 1st Cir. 12/28/06), 952 So.2d 112, writ denied, 2007-0130 (La. 2/22/08), 976 So.2d 1277 - Writing for an en banc First Circuit, Judge Kuhn specified that the court of appeal review for error is pursuant to La. Code of Criminal Procedure article 920, which provides that the only matters to be considered on appeal are errors designated in the assignments of error and "error that is discoverable by a mere inspection of the pleadings and proceedings and without inspection of the evidence, noting that the article makes no reference to the errors for review as patent. After a discussion of the jurisprudence, which gave rise to use of the patent-error review, the First Circuit pointed out that the Louisiana Supreme Court, as a whole, had turned away from its own jurisprudence "finding reversible patent error." Thus, the First Circuit held that defects in the proceedings—even violations of the constitution – that are not inherently prejudicial to the defendant are no longer considered reversible "patent error," and limited its review under Code of Criminal Procedure article 920 to errors that inherently prejudice the defendant.

=== Other rulings ===
Judge Kuhn ruled with the majority in a March 2008 1st Circuit Court of Appeal decision that reinstated a multi-million dollar award to a drunk driving crash victim. The case, originating with a 1994 head-on collision, was originally decided by 2004 jury, which awarded the victim $12.6 million (the state being responsible for 50% of the damages); in the spring of 2005, presiding State District Judge Timothy Kelley "amended the jury verdict to place all the blame for the wreck on the defendant, in which one person was killed." However, Kuhn et al. over-ruled his findings; per the court's decision the State of Louisiana is required to pay the victim $6.3 million plus interest.

== Other sources ==
- Kuhn seeks high court seat
- Louisiana Court of Appeal First Circuit Website
- Judge Kuhn's Election Website
- Baton Rouge Bar Association Supreme Court judicial forum
