= Morey Leonard Sear =

American judge (1929-2004)

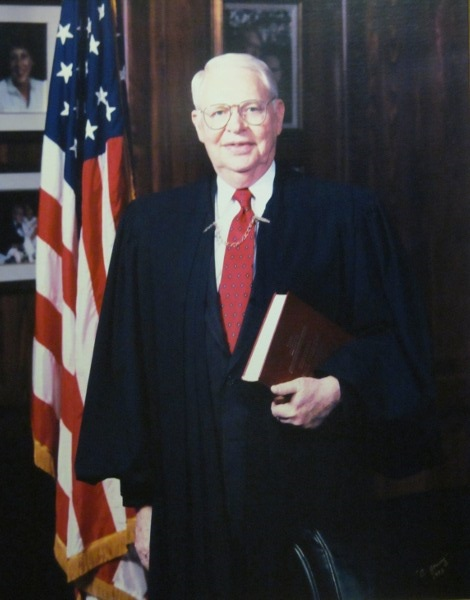

Senior Judge of the United States District Court for the Eastern District of Louisiana
- In office October 31, 2000 – September 6, 2004

Chief Judge of the United States District Court for the Eastern District of Louisiana
- In office 1992–1999
- Preceded by: Frederick Jacob Reagan Heebe
- Succeeded by: A. J. McNamara

Judge of the United States District Court for the Eastern District of Louisiana
- In office May 7, 1976 – October 31, 2000
- Appointed by: Gerald Ford
- Preceded by: James August Comiskey
- Succeeded by: Kurt D. Engelhardt

Magistrate Judge of the United States District Court for the Eastern District of Louisiana
- In office 1971–1976

Personal details
- Born: Morey Leonard Sear; February 26, 1929 New Orleans, Louisiana, U.S.
- Died: September 6, 2004 (aged 75) New Orleans, Louisiana, U.S.
- Education: Tulane University Law School (J.D.)

Morey Leonard Sear (February 26, 1929 – September 6, 2004) was a United States district judge of the United States District Court for the Eastern District of Louisiana.

== Education and career ==
Born in New Orleans, Louisiana, Sear received a Juris Doctor from Tulane University Law School in 1950. He was a Captain in the United States Marine Corps from 1950 to 1952. He was an assistant district attorney of the Parish of Orleans, Louisiana from 1952 to 1955. He was in private practice in New Orleans from 1955 to 1971, serving as special counsel to the New Orleans Aviation Board from 1956 to 1959.

== Federal judicial service ==
Sear served as a United States magistrate judge for the United States District Court for the Eastern District of Louisiana from 1971 to 1976. On March 30, 1976, Sear was nominated by President Gerald Ford to a seat on that court vacated by Judge James August Comiskey. Sear was confirmed by the United States Senate on May 6, 1976, and received his commission on May 7, 1976. He served as a Judge of the Temporary Emergency Court of Appeals from 1982 to 1993. He served as Chief Judge from 1992 to 1999, assuming senior status on October 31, 2000, and serving in that capacity until his death on September 6, 2004, in New Orleans.

== See also ==
- List of Jewish American jurists

== Sources ==
Legal offices
Preceded by James August Comiskey	Judge of the United States District Court for the Eastern District of Louisiana; 1976–2000	Succeeded by Kurt D. Engelhardt
Preceded by Frederick Jacob Reagan Heebe	Chief Judge of the United States District Court for the Eastern District of Louisiana; 1992–1999	Succeeded by A. J. McNamara
