= Stuart H. Smith =

(Attorney)

- Born: September 15, 1960; New Orleans, Louisiana
- Died: May 20, 2022 (aged 61)
- Occupation: Attorney

Stuart H. Smith (September 15, 1960 – May 20, 2022) was a plaintiff's attorney licensed in Louisiana. Smith practiced law for more than 25 years, litigating against oil companies and other energy-related corporations for damages associated with radioactive oilfield waste. Smith was one of the lead legal strategists in on-going national litigation regarding the nation's drug-industry manufactured opioid crisis, having led the nationwide effort to have the crisis’ impact on opioid-dependent born children recognized as a special class deserving of dedicated, long-term response from those who caused the epidemic in the United States.

== Biography ==
Smith dropped out of school at 15, earning his GED years later. He went on to earn his B.S. from Louisiana State University and his J.D. from Loyola University New Orleans College of Law in 1986.

Smith pledged $1.5 million to Loyola's Law School in 2008 and they renamed their law clinic the Stuart H. Smith Law Clinic and Center for Social Justice.

Smith was suspended from practicing law by the Louisiana State Supreme Court for a period of 3 months in 2018.

== Legal career ==
In 1992, Smith litigated against Chevron. Street v. Chevron pitted the family owners of a pipe-yard located in rural southeastern Mississippi against a multinational oil conglomerate. Allegedly, for years, Chevron had sent radioactive oilfield pipe to Street, Inc., for cleaning –– without informing the owners that the pipe contained radioactive material. Investigators from the Mississippi Division of Radiological Health found radiation from radium on the Street property 500 times the natural level. Chevron ultimately settled the case for an undisclosed amount of money in what remains one of the longest-running jury trials in Mississippi history.

In 1994, Smith teamed with Andrew Sacks to form Sacks & Smith, a New Orleans–based plaintiff law firm. Smith and Michael Stag began working together in 1997 and later established the firm SmithStag, focusing on plaintiff-oriented, environmental and toxic tort cases.

In 2001, Smith was lead counsel in an oilfield radiation case that resulted in a verdict of $1.056 billion against ExxonMobil for contaminating private property it leased from the Grefer family in Harvey, Louisiana. ExxonMobil appealed the verdict, securing a reduction in the punitive award, but was still ordered to pay hundreds of millions in damages.

In 2010 Smith registered Louisiana Truth PAC with the Federal Election Commission. The PAC attacked then State Representative Cedric Richmond as he sought to unseat Republican Joseph Cao. A third candidate, State Representative and New Orleans trial lawyer Juan LaFonta appeared to the beneficiary of Louisiana Truth PAC efforts. While Smith initially demurred on whether he funded it, he contributed thousands of dollars. Cedric Richmond went on to win that race and is now the powerful chairman of the Congressional Black Caucus. Smith continued to fund Louisiana Truth PAC as late as 2017. He had been a contributor to the American Association for Justice PAC, whose stated purpose is "preserving the civil justice system."

He was lead counsel in representing commercial fishermen in 2010, whose livelihoods continue to be devastated by the Deepwater Horizon oil spill in the Gulf of Mexico, and won the second largest verdict against an oil company in 2001 for exposing the cancer-causing soil contamination left behind in Harvey, Louisiana by ExxonMobil. He is author of Crude Justice: How I Fought Big Oil and Won.

In 2014, Stuart H. Smith supported an effort by the Vieux Carré Property Owners, Residents and Associates (VCPORA) to 'eliminate noise' in the French Quarter neighborhood of New Orleans. This sparked a massive fight between New Orleans preservationists and Smith/VCPORA. This culminated in Stuart H. Smith pleading guilty to the charge of cyber-stalking against the Hon. Kristin Gisleson Palmer.

== Personal life ==
Smith was married to Barry Cooper, his law partner, until Smith's death in France on May 20, 2022. After Smith's death, Cooper started his own law firm.
