= Greg G. Guidry =

American judge (born 1960)

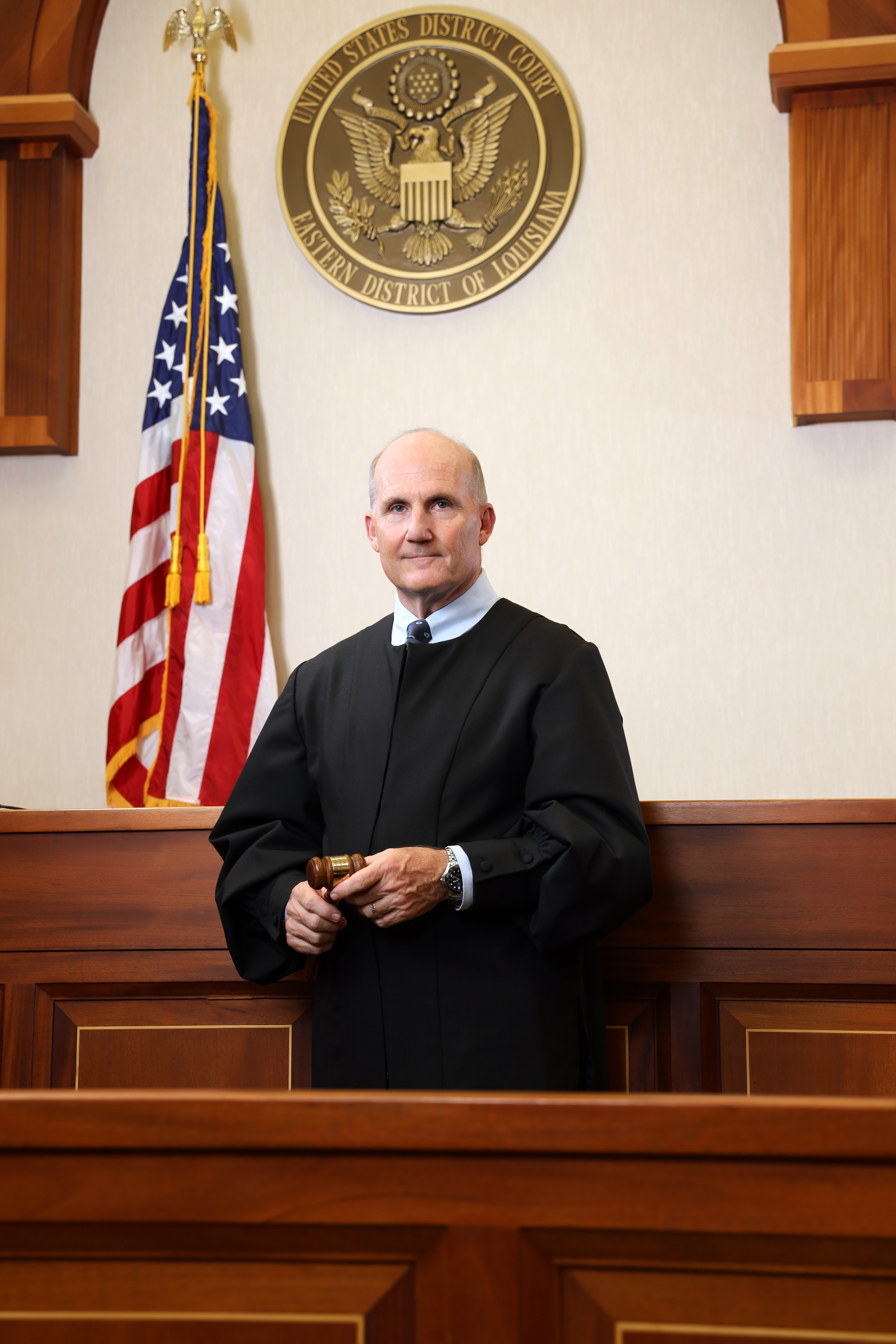

Judge of the United States District Court for the Eastern District of Louisiana
- Incumbent
- Assumed office June 21, 2019
- Appointed by: Donald Trump
- Preceded by: Kurt D. Engelhardt

Associate Justice of the Louisiana Supreme Court
- In office January 1, 2009 – June 21, 2019
- Succeeded by: William J. Crain

Personal details
- Born: Greg Gerard Guidry; July 1960 (age 65) Jefferson, Louisiana, U.S.
- Party: Republican
- Education: Louisiana State University (BA, JD); National Judicial College (MJS)

Greg Gerard Guidry (born July 1960) is a United States district judge of the United States District Court for the Eastern District of Louisiana. He is a former associate justice of the Louisiana Supreme Court.

== Early life ==
Guidry was born in July 1960 in Jefferson, Louisiana. He graduated from Louisiana State University with a Bachelor of Arts degree. In 1985, he graduated with a Juris Doctor from the Louisiana State University Law Center, Order of the Coif. While there he was selected for The Louisiana Law Review. In 2010, he earned a Master of Judicial Studies from the National Judicial College.

He was also awarded a Rotary International Foundation Scholarship for International Understanding. During the scholarship year, Guidry studied classical civilizations and Roman law at the University of the Witwatersrand in Johannesburg, South Africa.

== Career ==
Guidry served as an assistant United States attorney in the U.S. Attorney's Office for the Eastern District of Louisiana, where he was both chief of the Violent Crime Unit and chief of the Drug Unit, and an assistant attorney general in the Louisiana Department of Justice.

=== State court service ===
Guidry was formerly a judge on the Louisiana Court of Appeal for the Fifth Circuit, to which he was elected in August 2006. Earlier, Guidry served for six years as a judge of the Louisiana 24th Judicial District Court for Jefferson Parish in suburban New Orleans, Louisiana.

=== Louisiana Supreme Court ===
Guidry was elected to the high court on November 4, 2008, with 160,893 votes (60 percent); his opponent, fellow Republican Judge Jimmy Kuhn, received 108,541 votes (40 percent). His service on the Supreme Court terminated once he received his federal judicial commission.

=== Federal judicial service ===
In June 2018, Guidry was considered a contender for a vacancy on the U.S. District Court for the Eastern District of Louisiana. On January 16, 2019, President Donald Trump announced his intent to nominate Guidry to serve as a United States district judge for the United States District Court for the Eastern District of Louisiana. On January 17, 2019, his nomination was sent to the United States Senate. President Trump nominated Guidry to the seat vacated by Judge Kurt D. Engelhardt, who was elevated to the United States Court of Appeals for the Fifth Circuit on May 15, 2018. On February 13, 2019, a hearing on his nomination was held before the Senate Judiciary Committee. On March 7, 2019, his nomination was reported out of committee by a 12–10 vote. On June 18, 2019, the Senate invoked cloture on his nomination by a 53–43 vote. On June 19, 2019, he was confirmed by a 53–46 vote. He received his judicial commission on June 21, 2019.

The Associated Press reported Judge Greg Guidry donated tens of thousands of dollars to the Roman Catholic Archdiocese of New Orleans and consistently ruled in favor of the church amid bankruptcy involving nearly 500 clergy sex abuse victims. Some ethics experts said Guidry should immediately recuse himself to avoid even the appearance of a conflict. About a week later, he decided on a late-night reversal to recuse himself from the bankruptcy case involving the church. He issued his reversal with the statement, “I have decided to recuse myself from this matter in order to avoid any possible appearance of personal bias or prejudice”.

== See also ==
- List of justices of the Louisiana Supreme Court

Legal offices
Preceded by Kurt D. Engelhardt	Judge of the United States District Court for the Eastern District of Louisiana; 2019–present	Incumbent
