= Roger Blake West =

American judge (1928-1978)

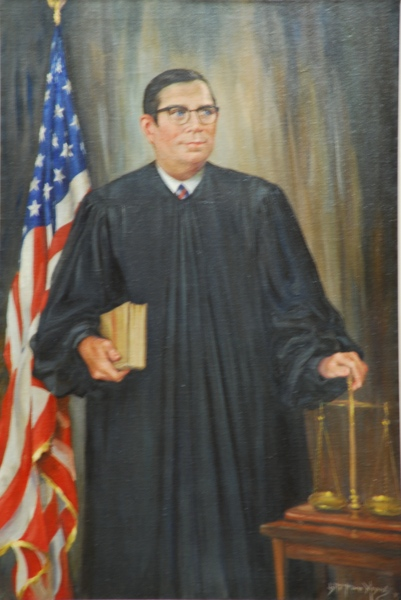

Judge of the United States District Court for the Eastern District of Louisiana
- In office June 22, 1971 – January 24, 1978
- Appointed by: Richard Nixon
- Preceded by: Seat established by 84 Stat. 294
- Succeeded by: Adrian G. Duplantier

Personal details
- Born: Roger Blake West; May 10, 1928 New Orleans, Louisiana
- Died: January 24, 1978 (aged 49)
- Education: Tulane University (B.A.); Tulane University Law School (LL.B.)

Roger Blake West (May 10, 1928 – January 24, 1978) was a United States district judge of the United States District Court for the Eastern District of Louisiana.

== Education and career ==
Born in New Orleans, Louisiana, West received a Bachelor of Arts degree from Tulane University in 1949 and a Bachelor of Laws from Tulane University Law School in 1951. He was in private practice in New Orleans from 1951 to 1971.

== Federal judicial service ==
On April 14, 1971, West was nominated by President Richard Nixon to a new seat on the United States District Court for the Eastern District of Louisiana created by 84 Stat. 294. He was confirmed by the United States Senate on June 18, 1971, and received his commission on June 22, 1971. West served in that capacity until his death on January 24, 1978.

== Sources ==
Legal offices
Preceded by Seat established by 84 Stat. 294	Judge of the United States District Court for the Eastern District of Louisiana; 1971–1978	Succeeded by Adrian G. Duplantier
