= Edward James Boyle Sr. =

American judge (1913–2002)

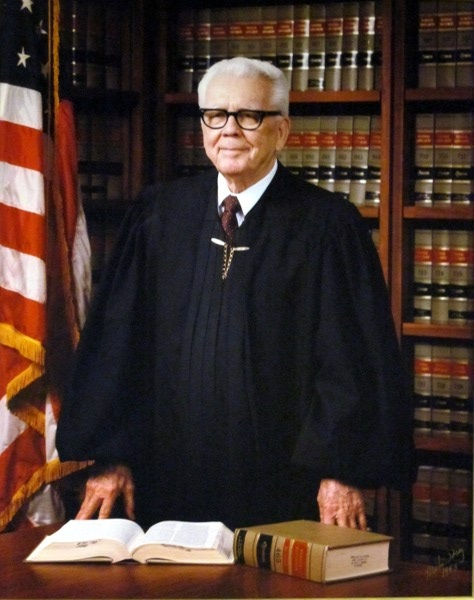

Senior Judge of the United States District Court for the Eastern District of Louisiana
- In office December 1, 1981 – July 24, 2002

Judge of the United States District Court for the Eastern District of Louisiana
- In office November 3, 1966 – December 1, 1981
- Appointed by: Lyndon B. Johnson
- Preceded by: Robert A. Ainsworth Jr.
- Succeeded by: A. J. McNamara

Personal details
- Born: Edward James Boyle Sr. October 11, 1913 McDonoghville, Louisiana, U.S.
- Died: July 24, 2002 (aged 88) New Orleans, Louisiana, U.S.
- Education: Loyola University New Orleans College of Law (LL.B.)

Edward James Boyle Sr. (October 11, 1913 – July 24, 2002) was a United States district judge of the United States District Court for the Eastern District of Louisiana.

== Education and career ==
Born in McDonoughville, Louisiana, Boyle received a Bachelor of Laws from Loyola University New Orleans College of Law in 1935. He was in private practice in New Orleans, Louisiana from 1935 to 1942 and again from 1945 to 1966. He was an Assistant United States Attorney of the Eastern District of Louisiana from 1942 to 1945.

== Federal judicial service ==
On August 16, 1966, Boyle was nominated by President Lyndon B. Johnson to a seat on the United States District Court for the Eastern District of Louisiana vacated by Judge Robert A. Ainsworth Jr. He was confirmed by the United States Senate on October 20, 1966, and received his commission on November 3, 1966. He assumed senior status on December 1, 1981. Boyle served in that capacity until his death in New Orleans on July 24, 2002.

== Sources ==
Legal offices
Preceded by Robert A. Ainsworth Jr.	Judge of the United States District Court for the Eastern District of Louisiana; 1966–1981	Succeeded by A. J. McNamara
