= Charles Schwartz Jr. =

American judge (1922–2012)

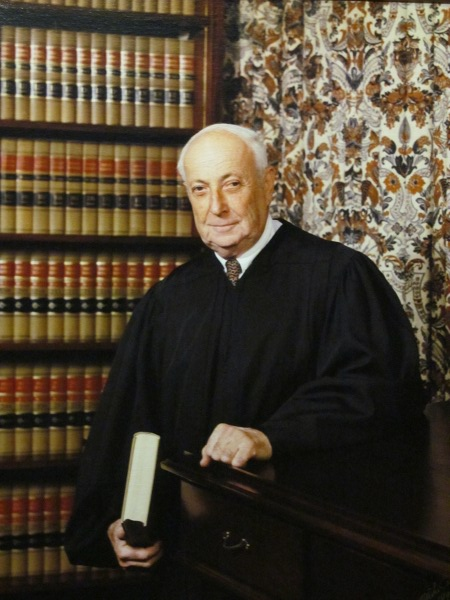

Senior Judge of the United States District Court for the Eastern District of Louisiana
- In office February 28, 1991 – November 3, 2012

Judge of the United States District Court for the Eastern District of Louisiana
- In office May 7, 1976 – February 28, 1991
- Appointed by: Gerald Ford
- Preceded by: Herbert William Christenberry
- Succeeded by: Edith Brown Clement

Personal details
- Born: Charles Schwartz Jr. August 20, 1922 New Orleans, Louisiana
- Died: November 3, 2012 (aged 90) Metairie, Louisiana
- Education: Tulane University (B.A.); Tulane University Law School (J.D.)

Charles Schwartz Jr. (August 20, 1922 – November 3, 2012) was a United States district judge of the United States District Court for the Eastern District of Louisiana.

== Education and career ==
Born in New Orleans, Louisiana, Schwartz received a Bachelor of Arts degree from Tulane University in 1943 and was in the United States Army as a Second Lieutenant from 1943 to 1945, remaining in the United States Army Reserve from 1946 to 1965 and attaining the rank of Major. He received a Juris Doctor from Tulane University Law School in 1947 and was then in private practice in New Orleans until 1976. He was a district counsel for the Gulf Coast District of the United States Maritime Administration from 1953 to 1962.

== Federal judicial service ==
On March 23, 1976, Schwartz was nominated by President Gerald Ford to a seat on the United States District Court for the Eastern District of Louisiana vacated by Judge Herbert William Christenberry. Schwartz was confirmed by the United States Senate on May 6, 1976, and received his commission on May 7, 1976. He assumed senior status on February 28, 1991. Concurrent to his federal judicial service, he taught as an adjunct professor of law at Tulane University, starting in 1977. Schwartz died on November 3, 2012, in Metairie, Louisiana.

== See also ==
- List of Jewish American jurists

== Sources ==
Legal offices
Preceded by Herbert William Christenberry	Judge of the United States District Court for the Eastern District of Louisiana; 1976–1991	Succeeded by Edith Brown Clement
