= Adrian G. Duplantier =

American judge (1929–2007)

Adrian Guy Duplantier Sr.
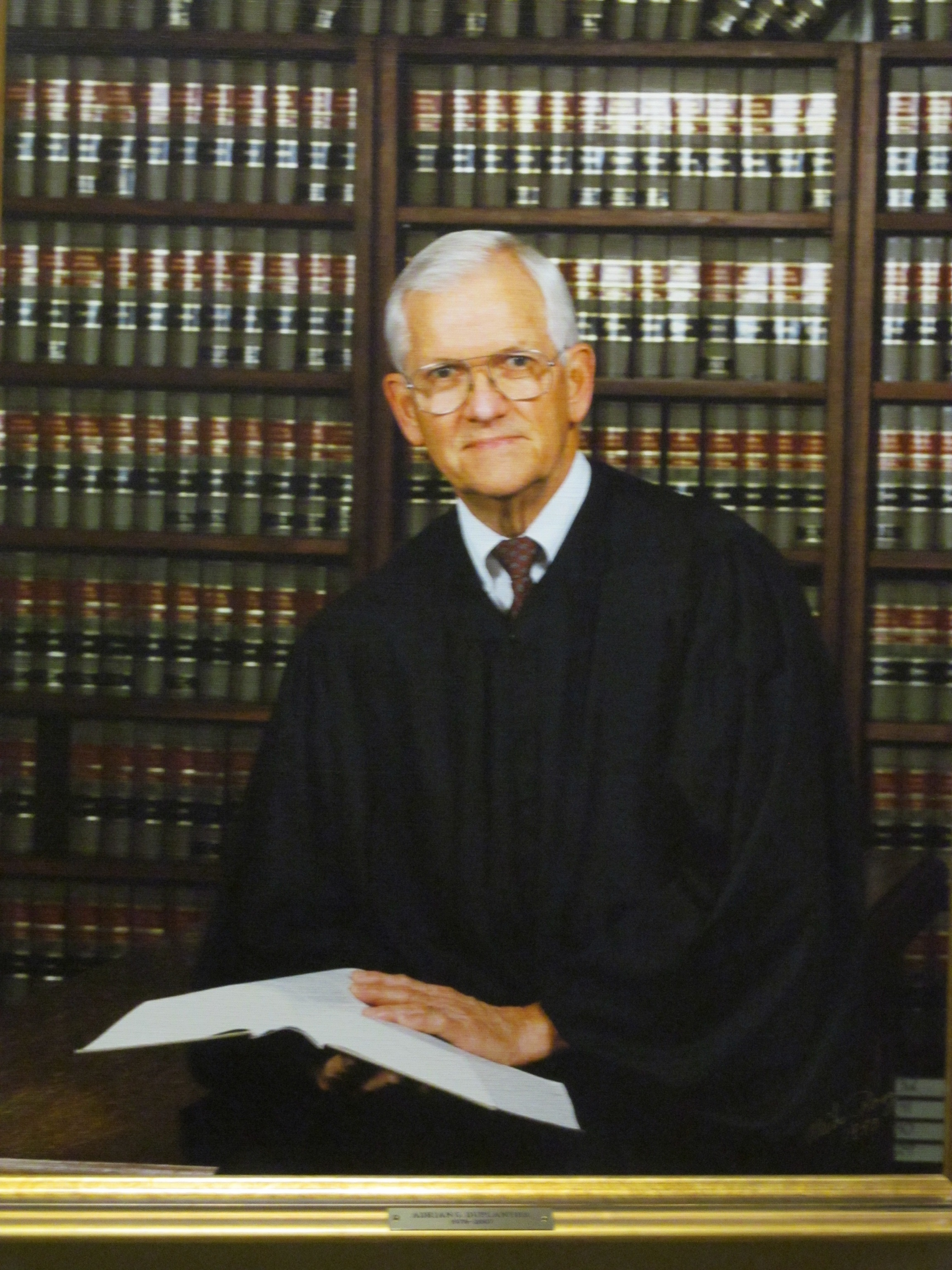

Senior Judge of the United States District Court for the Eastern District of Louisiana
- In office March 6, 1994 – August 15, 2007

Judge of the United States District Court for the Eastern District of Louisiana
- In office May 31, 1978 – March 6, 1994
- Appointed by: Jimmy Carter
- Preceded by: Roger Blake West
- Succeeded by: Eldon E. Fallon

Judge of the New Orleans Civil District Court
- In office 1974–1978

Louisiana State Senator for Orleans Parish (later District 4)
- In office 1960–1974
- Preceded by: 8 at-large members from Orleans Parish
- Succeeded by: Sidney Barthelemy

Personal details
- Born: Adrian Guy Duplantier; March 5, 1929 New Orleans, Louisiana, US
- Died: August 15, 2007 (aged 78) New Orleans, Louisiana, US
- Party: Democratic
- Education: Loyola University New Orleans College of Law (JD); University of Virginia School of Law (LLM)

Adrian Guy Duplantier Sr. (March 5, 1929 – August 15, 2007) was a United States district judge of the United States District Court for the Eastern District of Louisiana. He served as a Democratic member of the Louisiana State Senate, representing a portion of Orleans Parish for four terms.

== Education and career ==
Duplantier was born in New Orleans. He graduated from the Roman Catholic Jesuit High School in 1945 and graduated from Loyola University New Orleans College of Law in 1949.

== State senate and judicial service ==
Failed bid for mayor of New Orleans in 1962, despite winning nearly all of the black vote, but losing the election to Victor H. Schiro

== Federal judicial service ==
On April 24, 1978, Duplantier was nominated by President Jimmy Carter to a seat on the United States District Court for the Eastern District of Louisiana vacated by Judge Roger Blake West. Duplantier was confirmed by the United States Senate on May 26, 1978, and received his commission on May 31, 1978. He assumed senior status on March 6, 1994, and served until his death, in New Orleans.

Duplantier and two other Louisiana Democrats, former State Treasurer Mary Evelyn Parker and former State Representative Risley C. Triche of Napoleonville in Assumption Parish, were interviewed for the 2001 book Welfare Racism: Playing the Race Card Against America's Poor. The three testified to their personal knowledge of racism in 1960–1961 in Louisiana against African American public assistance recipients.

== Sources ==
- Obituary at Legacy.com
- "New York Times search". The New York Times.
- Judge Duplantier was generous benefactor of Loyola University
- Hon. Adrian Duplantier '45 Devoted Blue Jay and Founder of Boys' Hope, Inducted into the Hall of Honors
- The Life and Times of The Hon. Adrian G. Duplantier

Political offices
Preceded by 8 at-large members	Louisiana State Senator from Orleans Parish (later District 4); 1960–1974	Succeeded by Sidney Barthelemy
Legal offices
Preceded by Roger Blake West	Judge of the United States District Court for the Eastern District of Louisiana; 1978–2007	Succeeded by Eldon E. Fallon
