= Jay C. Zainey =

American judge (born 1951)

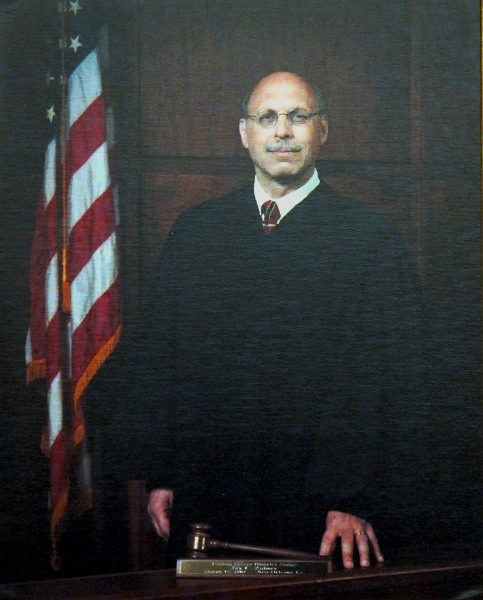

Judge of the United States District Court for the Eastern District of Louisiana
- Incumbent
- Assumed office February 14, 2002
- Appointed by: George W. Bush
- Preceded by: A. J. McNamara

Personal details
- Born: July 7, 1951 (age 74) New Orleans, Louisiana, U.S.
- Education: University of New Orleans (BS); Louisiana State University (JD)

Jay Christopher Zainey (born July 7, 1951) is a United States district judge of the United States District Court for the Eastern District of Louisiana.

== Education and career ==
Born in New Orleans, Louisiana, Zainey was a member of the United States Air Force Reserve from 1970 to 1976. During this time he received a Bachelor of Science degree from the University of New Orleans in 1972 and a Juris Doctor from the Paul M. Hebert Law Center at Louisiana State University in 1975, and was a law clerk to a private practice in Louisiana from 1974 to 1975. He was then an attorney in private practice in Louisiana from 1976 to 2002.

=== Federal judicial service ===
On October 10, 2001, Zainey was nominated by President George W. Bush to a seat on the United States District Court for the Eastern District of Louisiana vacated by A. J. McNamara. Zainey was confirmed by the United States Senate on February 11, 2002, and received commission on February 14, 2002.

== Sources ==
Legal offices
Preceded by A. J. McNamara	Judge of the United States District Court for the Eastern District of Louisiana; 2002–present	Incumbent
