= Sarah S. Vance =

American judge (born 1950)

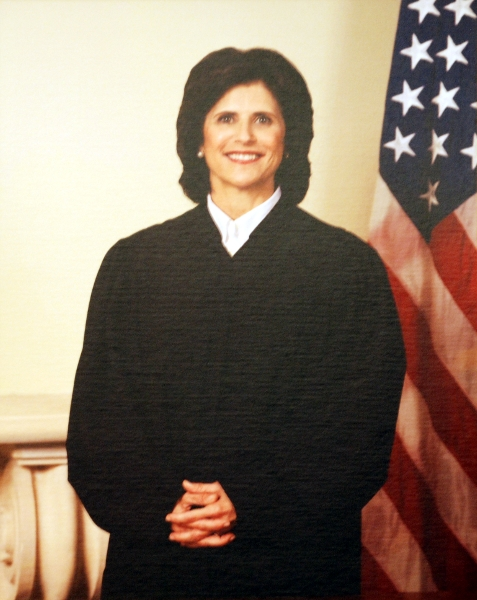

Senior Judge of the United States District Court for the Eastern District of Louisiana
- Incumbent
- Assumed office January 16, 2024

Chief Judge of the United States District Court for the Eastern District of Louisiana
- In office October 1, 2008 – September 30, 2015
- Preceded by: Helen Ginger Berrigan
- Succeeded by: Kurt D. Engelhardt

Judge of the United States District Court for the Eastern District of Louisiana
- In office September 29, 1994 – January 16, 2024
- Appointed by: Bill Clinton
- Preceded by: Henry Mentz
- Succeeded by: Anna St. John

Personal details
- Born: Sarah Elizabeth Savoia; January 16, 1950 (age 76) Donaldsonville, Louisiana, U.S.
- Education: Louisiana State University (BA); Tulane University (JD)

Sarah Elizabeth Savoia Vance (born January 16, 1950) is a senior United States district judge of the United States District Court for the Eastern District of Louisiana.

== Education and career ==
Born in Donaldsonville, Louisiana, Vance received a Bachelor of Arts degree from Louisiana State University in 1971 and a Juris Doctor from Tulane University Law School in 1978, where she served as a managing editor of the Tulane Law Review. She was in private practice in New Orleans from 1978 to 1994 with the firm of Stone Pigman Walther Wittmann & Hutchinson, practicing in the areas of antitrust and commercial litigation.

=== Federal judicial service ===
On June 8, 1994, President Bill Clinton nominated Vance to a seat on the United States District Court for the Eastern District of Louisiana vacated by Judge Henry Mentz who assumed senior status on July 1, 1992. Vance was confirmed by the United States Senate on September 28, 1994, and received her commission on September 29, 1994. She served as chief judge of the Eastern District from 2008 to 2015. She assumed senior status on January 16, 2024. Vance served as the chair of the Judicial Panel on Multidistrict Litigation from 2014 to 2019.

Vance also served on the Executive Committee of the Judicial Conference of the United States from 2010 to 2013, and on the Judicial Conference’s Committee on Administration of the Bankruptcy System from 1997 to 2003. She currently serves on the Judicial Conduct and Disability Committee of the Judicial Conference of the United States. From 2003 until 2007, she served on the Board of Directors of the Federal Judicial Center, where she chaired the Committee on Judicial Education. She currently serves on the Federal Judiciary Workplace Conduct Working Group.

== Other service ==
Vance has been a member of the American Law Institute since 1996, and serves on its Executive Committee and its Council. She served as an advisor to the ALI’s International Jurisdiction and Judgments project from 2003 to 2006 and the Restatement of the Law on Liability Insurance from 2010 to 2019, and currently serves as an advisor to the Restatement of the Law Third, Torts: Remedies.

Vance also served as president of the New Orleans Chapter of the Federal Bar Association from 2015 to 2016, and as chair of the Louisiana State Bar Association’s Antitrust and Trade Regulation Section from 1993 to 1995. She has been actively involved in the Antitrust Section of the American Bar Association since 1993. She has also served as a member of the Tulane Law School Dean’s Advisory Board since 2008, and as a professor on the adjunct faculty at Tulane Law School.

== Honors and distinctions ==
In 2022, Vance received the Edward J. Devitt Distinguished Service to Justice Award for a distinguished career and significant contributions to the administration of justice, the advancement of the rule of law, and the improvement of society as a whole.

Vance has also been the recipient of the Trailblazer Award from Emory Law Institute for Complex Litigation and Mass Claims in 2019, the Distinguished Jurist Award from the Louisiana Bar Association in 2015, and the New Orleans CityBusiness Women of the Year Award in 2014. In 2017, Vance was inducted into the Tulane Law School Hall of Fame.

== Sources ==
Legal offices
Preceded by Henry Mentz	Judge of the United States District Court for the Eastern District of Louisiana; 1994–2024	Succeeded by Anna St. John
Preceded by Helen Ginger Berrigan	Chief Judge of the United States District Court for the Eastern District of Louisiana; 2008–2015	Succeeded by Kurt D. Engelhardt
