= Robert A. Ainsworth Jr. =

American judge (1910–1981)

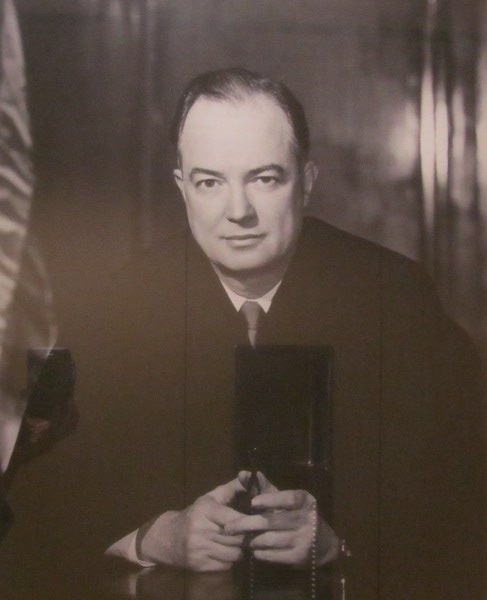

Judge of the United States Court of Appeals for the Fifth Circuit
- In office July 22, 1966 – December 22, 1981
- Appointed by: Lyndon B. Johnson
- Preceded by: Seat established by 80 Stat. 75
- Succeeded by: W. Eugene Davis

Judge of the United States District Court for the Eastern District of Louisiana
- In office September 22, 1961 – August 31, 1966
- Appointed by: John F. Kennedy
- Preceded by: Seat established by 75 Stat. 80
- Succeeded by: Edward James Boyle Sr.

Personal details
- Born: Robert Andrew Ainsworth Jr. May 10, 1910 Gulfport, Mississippi, U.S.
- Died: December 22, 1981 (aged 71)
- Education: Loyola University New Orleans College of Law (LLB)

Robert Andrew Ainsworth Jr. (May 10, 1910 – December 22, 1981) was a United States circuit judge of the United States Court of Appeals for the Fifth Circuit and previously was a United States district judge of the United States District Court for the Eastern District of Louisiana.

== Education and career ==
Born in Gulfport, Mississippi, to Catherine and Robert Andrew Ainsworth Sr., Ainsworth earned a Bachelor of Laws from Loyola University New Orleans College of Law in 1932. He was in private practice in New Orleans, Louisiana, from 1932 to 1961. He was a Lieutenant in the United States Navy during World War II, in 1944. He was a member of the Louisiana State Senate from 1952 to 1961, serving as President pro tem from 1952 to 1956 and from 1960 to 1961.

== Federal judicial service ==
Ainsworth was nominated by President John F. Kennedy on September 14, 1961, to the United States District Court for the Eastern District of Louisiana, to a new seat authorized by 75 Stat. 80. He was confirmed by the United States Senate on September 21, 1961, and received his commission on September 22, 1961. His service terminated on August 31, 1966, due to elevation to the Fifth Circuit.

Ainsworth was nominated by President Lyndon B. Johnson on June 28, 1966, to the United States Court of Appeals for the Fifth Circuit, to a new seat authorized by 80 Stat. 75. He was confirmed by the Senate on July 22, 1966, and received his commission on July 22, 1966. His service terminated on December 22, 1981, due to his death.

== Personal life ==
Ainsworth married Elizabeth Estelle Hiern (1911–1999) in 1933. They had 3 children.

== Sources ==
Legal offices
Preceded by Seat established by 75 Stat. 80	Judge of the United States District Court for the Eastern District of Louisiana; 1961–1966	Succeeded by Edward James Boyle Sr.
Preceded by Seat established by 80 Stat. 75	Judge of the United States Court of Appeals for the Fifth Circuit; 1966–1981	Succeeded by W. Eugene Davis
