= Kurt D. Engelhardt =

American judge (born 1960)

Kurt Engelhardt
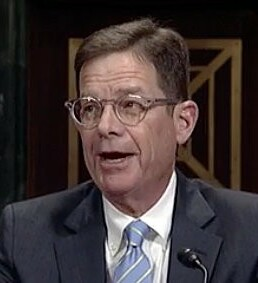

Judge of the United States Court of Appeals for the Fifth Circuit
- Incumbent
- Assumed office May 10, 2018
- Appointed by: Donald Trump
- Preceded by: Edith Brown Clement

Chief Judge of the United States District Court for the Eastern District of Louisiana
- In office October 1, 2015 – May 15, 2018
- Preceded by: Sarah S. Vance
- Succeeded by: Nannette Jolivette Brown

Judge of the United States District Court for the Eastern District of Louisiana
- In office December 13, 2001 – May 15, 2018
- Appointed by: George W. Bush
- Preceded by: Morey Leonard Sear
- Succeeded by: Greg G. Guidry

Personal details
- Born: Kurt Damian Engelhardt; April 21, 1960 (age 66) New Orleans, Louisiana, U.S.
- Party: Republican
- Education: Louisiana State University (BA, JD)

Kurt Damian Engelhardt (born April 21, 1960) is a United States circuit judge of the United States Court of Appeals for the Fifth Circuit. Previously, he was the Chief United States district judge of the United States District Court for the Eastern District of Louisiana.

== Education and career ==
Born in New Orleans, Louisiana, Engelhardt attended Brother Martin High School in New Orleans, received a Bachelor of Arts degree from Louisiana State University in 1982 and a Juris Doctor from Louisiana State University Law Center in 1985. He was a law clerk to Judge Charles Grisbaum of the Louisiana Fifth Circuit Court of Appeal from 1985 to 1987. He was in private practice in Louisiana from then until 2001, first at the law firm of Little & Metzger and then at Hailey, McNamara, Hall, Larmann & Papale LLP. Concurrent with his private practice, he was appointed by the Governor of Louisiana to serve on the Louisiana Judiciary Commission, which adjudicates statewide ethics complaints against judges. In 1998, he was elected Chairman of the Commission by his fellow members. He has been a member of the New Orleans chapter of the Federalist Society since 2002.

== Federal judicial service ==
=== District court service ===
On September 4, 2001, Engelhardt was nominated by President George W. Bush to a seat on the United States District Court for the Eastern District of Louisiana vacated by Morey Leonard Sear. Engelhardt was confirmed by the United States Senate on December 11, 2001, and received his commission on December 13, 2001. He served as Chief Judge from October 1, 2015 to May 15, 2018. During his service on the bench, Engelhardt served on the Judicial Conference Committee of Federal-State Jurisdiction, appointed in 2004 by Chief Justice William Rehnquist and reappointed in 2007 by Chief Justice John Roberts. From 2011 to 2012, he served as President of the New Orleans Chapter of the Federal Bar Association. His service on the district court terminated on May 15, 2018, upon elevation to the court of appeals.

=== Court of Appeals service ===
On September 28, 2017, President Donald Trump announced his intent to nominate Engelhardt to the United States Court of Appeals for the Fifth Circuit, transmitting the nomination to the United States Senate on October 5, 2017. He was nominated to the seat being vacated by Judge Edith Brown Clement, who had announced her intention to assume senior status upon the confirmation of her successor. The American Bar Association unanimously rated Engelhardt as "Well Qualified", the committee's highest rating.

On January 3, 2018, his nomination was returned to the President under Rule XXXI, Paragraph 6 of the United States Senate. On January 5, 2018, President Donald Trump announced his intent to renominate Engelhardt to a federal appellate judgeship. On January 8, 2018, his renomination to the same seat was sent to the Senate, and a hearing on his nomination before the Senate Judiciary Committee was held on January 10, 2018. On February 8, 2018, the Senate Judiciary Committee reported his nomination out of committee by a 15–6 vote. On May 7, 2018, the Senate invoked cloture on his nomination by a 64–31 vote. On May 9, 2018, his nomination was confirmed by a 62–34 vote. He received his judicial commission on May 10, 2018.

On June 9, 2026, Engelhardt announced that he was taking senior status.

Legal offices
Preceded by Morey Leonard Sear	Judge of the United States District Court for the Eastern District of Louisiana; 2001–2018	Succeeded by Greg G. Guidry
Preceded by Sarah S. Vance	Chief Judge of the United States District Court for the Eastern District of Louisiana; 2015–2018	Succeeded by Nannette Jolivette Brown
Preceded by Edith Brown Clement	Judge of the United States Court of Appeals for the Fifth Circuit; 2018–present	Incumbent
