= Herbert William Christenberry =

American judge (1897–1975)

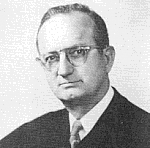

Chief Judge of the United States District Court for the Eastern District of Louisiana
- In office 1949–1967
- Preceded by: Office established
- Succeeded by: Elmer Gordon West

Judge of the United States District Court for the Eastern District of Louisiana
- In office December 20, 1947 – October 5, 1975
- Appointed by: Harry S. Truman
- Preceded by: Adrian Joseph Caillouet
- Succeeded by: Charles Schwartz Jr.

Personal details
- Born: Herbert William Christenberry; December 11, 1897 New Orleans, Louisiana, U.S.
- Died: October 5, 1975 (aged 77) Kentwood, Louisiana, U.S.
- Education: New York University; Loyola University New Orleans College of Law (LL.B.)

Herbert William Christenberry (December 11, 1897 – October 5, 1975) was a United States district judge of the United States District Court for the Eastern District of Louisiana.

== Education and career ==
Born in New Orleans, Louisiana, Christenberry attended New York University and was in the United States Navy from 1917 to 1918 during World War I. In 1924, he obtained a Bachelor of Laws from Loyola University New Orleans College of Law. He was in private practice in New Orleans from 1924 to 1933. He was an assistant attorney of the Board of Commissioners of the Port of New Orleans from 1933 to 1935. He was a deputy commissioner on the Louisiana Debt Moratorium Commission in 1935, and from 1935 to 1937 was an assistant district attorney of Orleans Parish. He was an Assistant United States Attorney of the Eastern District of Louisiana from 1937 to 1942, and was then the United States Attorney for that district from 1942 to 1947.

== Federal judicial service ==
Christenberry was nominated by President Harry S. Truman on July 11, 1947, to a seat on the United States District Court for the Eastern District of Louisiana vacated by Judge Adrian Joseph Caillouet. He was confirmed by the United States Senate on December 18, 1947, and received his commission on December 20, 1947. He served as Chief Judge from 1949 to 1967. His service terminated on October 5, 1975, due to his death in Kentwood, Louisiana.

== Sources ==
Legal offices
Preceded by Adrian Joseph Caillouet	Judge of the United States District Court for the Eastern District of Louisiana; 1947–1975	Succeeded by Charles Schwartz Jr.
Preceded by Office established	Chief Judge of the United States District Court for the Eastern District of Louisiana; 1949–1967	Succeeded by Elmer Gordon West
