= United States District Court for the Eastern District of Louisiana =

United States federal district court in Louisiana

Coordinates: 29.9485°N 90.0691°W

- (E.D. La.)
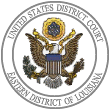

- Location: New Orleans More locations: Houma
- Appeals to: Fifth Circuit
- Established: March 3, 1881
- Judges: 12
- Chief Judge: Wendy Vitter

Officers of the court
- U.S. Attorney: David Courcelle
- U.S. Marshal: Enix Smith III
- www.laed.uscourts.gov

The United States District Court for the Eastern District of Louisiana (in case citations, E.D. La.) is a United States federal court based in New Orleans.

Appeals from the Eastern District of Louisiana are taken to the United States Court of Appeals for the Fifth Circuit (except for patent claims and claims against the U.S. government under the Tucker Act, which are appealed to the Federal Circuit).

As of December 29, 2025, the United States attorney for the Eastern District of Louisiana is David Courcelle.

== Jurisdiction ==
This district comprises the following parishes: Assumption, Jefferson, Lafourche, Orleans, Plaquemines, St. Bernard, St. Charles, St. James, St. John the Baptist, St. Tammany, Tangipahoa, Terrebonne, and Washington.

== History ==
On March 26, 1804, Congress organized the Territory of Orleans and created the United States District Court for the District of Orleans—the only time Congress provided a territory with a district court equal in its authority and jurisdiction to those of the states. The United States District Court for the District of Louisiana was established on April 8, 1812, by 2 Stat. 701, several weeks before Louisiana was formally admitted as a state of the union. The District was thereafter subdivided and reformed several times. It was first subdivided into Eastern and Western Districts on March 3, 1823, by 3 Stat. 774.

On February 13, 1845, Louisiana was reorganized into a single District with one judgeship, by 5 Stat. 722, but was again divided into Eastern and the Western Districts on March 3, 1849, by 9 Stat. 401. Congress again abolished the Western District of Louisiana and reorganized Louisiana as a single judicial district on July 27, 1866, by 14 Stat. 300. On March 3, 1881, by 21 Stat. 507, Louisiana was for a third time divided into Eastern and the Western Districts, with one judgeship authorized for each. The Middle District was formed from portions of those two Districts on December 18, 1971, by 85 Stat. 741.

After the United States District Court for the Canal Zone was abolished on March 31, 1982, all pending litigation was transferred to the Eastern District of Louisiana.

== Current judges ==
As of April 13, 2026:

#	Title	Judge	Duty station	Born	Term of service			Appointed by
#	Title	Judge	Duty station	Born	Active	Chief	Senior	Appointed by
57	Chief Judge	Wendy Vitter	New Orleans	1961	2019–present	2025–present	—	Trump
51	District Judge	Jay C. Zainey	New Orleans	1951	2002–present	—	—	G.W. Bush
53	District Judge	Nannette Jolivette Brown	New Orleans	1963	2011–present	2018–2025	—	Obama
54	District Judge	Jane Triche Milazzo	New Orleans	1957	2011–present	—	—	Obama
55	District Judge	Susie Morgan	New Orleans	1953	2012–present	—	—	Obama
56	District Judge	Barry Ashe	New Orleans	1956	2018–present	—	—	Trump
58	District Judge	Greg G. Guidry	New Orleans	1960	2019–present	—	—	Trump
59	District Judge	Darrel J. Papillion	New Orleans	1968	2023–present	—	—	Biden
60	District Judge	Brandon Scott Long	New Orleans	1976	2023–present	—	—	Biden
61	District Judge	William J. Crain	New Orleans	1961	2025–present	—	—	Trump
62	District Judge	Anna St. John	New Orleans	1979	2026–present	—	—	Trump
63	District Judge	vacant	—	—	—	—	—	—
43	Senior Judge	Sarah S. Vance	New Orleans	1950	1994–2024	2008–2015	2024–present	Clinton
46	Senior Judge	Eldon E. Fallon	New Orleans	1939	1995–2024	—	2024–present	Clinton
47	Senior Judge	Mary Ann Vial Lemmon	New Orleans	1941	1996–2011	—	2011–present	Clinton
48	Senior Judge	Ivan L. R. Lemelle	New Orleans	1950	1998–2015	—	2015–present	Clinton
49	Senior Judge	Carl Barbier	New Orleans	1944	1998–2023	—	2023–present	Clinton
52	Senior Judge	Lance Africk	New Orleans	1951	2002–2024	—	2024–present	G.W. Bush

== Vacancies and pending nominations ==
Seat	Prior judge's duty station	Seat last held by	Vacancy reason	Date of vacancy	Nominee	Date of nomination
2	New Orleans	Lance Africk	Senior status	October 1, 2024	Peter M. Mansfield	September 14, 2026
5	New Orleans	Anna St. John	Elevation	January 2, 2027	Bradford Kelley	September 14, 2026

== Former judges ==
#	Judge	Born–died	Active service	Chief Judge	Senior status	Appointed by	Reason for termination
1	John Dick	1788–1824	1823–1824 (Note: Reassigned from the District of Louisiana. Jointly appointed to both the Eastern and Western Districts of Louisiana.)	—	—	Madison/Operation of law	death
2	Thomas B. Robertson	1779–1828	1824–1828 (Note: Jointly appointed to both the Eastern and Western Districts of Louisiana.)	—	—	Monroe	death
3	Samuel Hadden Harper	1783–1837	1829–1837	—	—	Jackson	death
4	Philip Kissick Lawrence	c.1793–1841	1837–1841	—	—	Van Buren	death
5	Theodore Howard McCaleb	1810–1864	1841–1845; 1849–1861 (Note: Reassigned from the District of Louisiana.)	—	—	Tyler; Operation of law	reassignment resignation
6	Edward Henry Durell	1810–1887	1863–1866 (Note: Recess appointment; formally nominated on February 8, 1864, confirmed by the United States Senate on February 17, 1864, and received commission the same day.)	—	—	Lincoln	reassignment
7	Edward Coke Billings	1829–1893	1881–1893	—	—	Grant/Operation of law	death
8	Charles Parlange	1851–1907	1894–1907	—	—	Cleveland	death
9	Eugene Davis Saunders	1853–1914	1907–1909	—	—	T. Roosevelt	resignation
10	Rufus Edward Foster	1871–1942	1909–1925	—	—	T. Roosevelt	elevation
11	Charlton Beattie	1869–1925	1925	—	—	Coolidge	death
12	Louis Henry Burns	1878–1928	1925–1928 (Note: Recess appointment; formally nominated on December 8, 1925, confirmed by the Senate on December 21, 1925, and received commission the same day.)	—	—	Coolidge	death
13	Wayne G. Borah	1891–1966	1928–1949 (Note: Recess appointment; formally nominated on December 6, 1928, confirmed by the Senate on December 17, 1928, and received commission the same day.)	—	—	Coolidge	elevation
14	Adrian Joseph Caillouet	1883–1946	1940–1946	—	—	F. Roosevelt	death
15	Herbert William Christenberry	1897–1975	1947–1975	1949–1967	—	Truman	death
16	J. Skelly Wright	1911–1988	1949–1962 (Note: Recess appointment; formally nominated on January 5, 1950, confirmed by the Senate on March 8, 1950, and received commission on March 9, 1950.)	—	—	Truman	elevation
17	Elmer Gordon West	1914–1992	1961–1972	1967–1972	—	Kennedy	reassignment
18	Robert A. Ainsworth Jr.	1910–1981	1961–1966	—	—	Kennedy	elevation
19	Frank Burton Ellis	1907–1969	1962–1965	—	1965–1969	Kennedy	death
20	Frederick J. R. Heebe	1922–2014	1966–1992	1972–1992	1992–2014	L. Johnson	death
21	Edward James Boyle Sr.	1913–2002	1966–1981	—	1981–2002	L. Johnson	death
22	Fred James Cassibry	1918–1996	1966–1984	—	1984–1987	L. Johnson	retirement
23	Lansing Leroy Mitchell	1914–2001	1966–1981	—	1981–2001	L. Johnson	death
24	Alvin Benjamin Rubin	1920–1991	1966–1977	—	—	L. Johnson	elevation
25	James August Comiskey	1926–2005	1967–1975	—	—	L. Johnson	resignation
26	Jack Murphy Gordon	1931–1982	1971–1982	—	—	Nixon	death
27	Roger Blake West	1928–1978	1971–1978	—	—	Nixon	death
28	Charles Schwartz Jr.	1922–2012	1976–1991	—	1991–2012	Ford	death
29	Morey Leonard Sear	1929–2004	1976–2000	1992–1999	2000–2004	Ford	death
30	Robert Frederick Collins	1931–present	1978–1993	—	—	Carter	resignation
31	Adrian G. Duplantier	1929–2007	1978–1994	—	1994–2007	Carter	death
32	George Arceneaux	1928–1993	1979–1993	—	—	Carter	death
33	Patrick Eugene Carr	1922–1998	1979–1991	—	1991–1998	Carter	death
34	Veronica DiCarlo Wicker	1930–1994	1979–1994	—	—	Carter	death
35	Peter Beer	1928–2018	1979–1994	—	1994–2018	Carter	death
36	A. J. McNamara	1936–2014	1982–2001	1999–2001	2001–2014	Reagan	death
37	Henry Mentz	1920–2005	1982–1992	—	1992–2001	Reagan	retirement
38	Martin Leach-Cross Feldman	1934–2022	1983–2022	—	—	Reagan	death
39	Marcel Livaudais Jr.	1925–2009	1984–1996	—	1996–2008	Reagan	retirement
40	Edith Brown Clement	1948–present	1991–2001	2001	—	G.H.W. Bush	elevation
41	Helen Ginger Berrigan	1948–2024	1994–2016	2001–2008	2016–2024	Clinton	death
42	Stanwood Duval	1942–present	1994–2008	—	2008–2017	Clinton	retirement
44	Okla Jones II	1945–1996	1994–1996	—	—	Clinton	death
45	Thomas Porteous	1946–2021	1994–2010	—	—	Clinton	removal
50	Kurt D. Engelhardt	1960–present	2001–2018	2015–2018	—	G.W. Bush	elevation

== Chief judges ==
Chief judges have administrative responsibilities with respect to their district court. Unlike the Supreme Court, where one justice is specifically nominated to be chief, the office of chief judge rotates among the district court judges. To be chief, a judge must have been in active service on the court for at least one year, be under the age of 65, and have not previously served as chief judge.

A vacancy is filled by the judge highest in seniority among the group of qualified judges. The chief judge serves for a term of seven years, or until age 70, whichever occurs first. The age restrictions are waived if no members of the court would otherwise be qualified for the position.

When the office was created in 1948, the chief judge was the longest-serving judge who had not elected to retire, on what has since 1958 been known as senior status, or declined to serve as chief judge. After August 6, 1959, judges could not become or remain chief after turning 70 years old. The current rules have been in operation since October 1, 1982.

== Succession of seats ==
Seat 1
Seat reassigned from District of Louisiana on March 3, 1823 by 3 Stat. 774 (concurrent with Western District)
Dick	1823–1824
Robertson	1824–1828
Harper	1829–1837
Lawrence	1837–1841
McCaleb	1841–1845
Seat reassigned to District of Louisiana on February 13, 1845 by 5 Stat. 722
Seat reassigned from District of Louisiana on March 3, 1849 by 9 Stat. 401
McCaleb	1849–1861
Durell	1864–1866
Seat reassigned to District of Louisiana on July 27, 1866 by 14 Stat. 300
Seat reassigned from District of Louisiana on March 3, 1881 by 21 Stat. 507
Billings	1881–1893
Parlange	1894–1907
Saunders	1907–1909
Foster	1909–1925
Beattie	1925
Burns	1925–1928
Borah	1928–1949
Wright	1950–1962
Ellis	1962–1965
Heebe	1966–1992
Jones II	1994–1996
Barbier	1998–2023
Papillion	2023–present

Seat 2
Seat established on March 18, 1938 by 52 Stat. 110
Caillouet	1940–1946
Christenberry, Sr.	1947–1975
Schwartz, Jr.	1976–1991
Clement	1991–2001
Africk	2002–2024
vacant	2024–present

Seat 3
Seat established on May 19, 1961 by 75 Stat. 80
E. West	1961–1972
Seat reassigned to Middle District on April 16, 1972 by 85 Stat. 741

Seat 4
Seat established on May 19, 1961 by 75 Stat. 80
Ainsworth, Jr.	1961–1966
Boyle, Sr.	1966–1981
McNamara	1982–2001
Zainey	2002–present

Seat 5
Seat established on March 18, 1966 by 80 Stat. 75
Mitchell	1966–1981
Mentz, Jr.	1982–1992
Vance	1994–2024
St. John	2026–present

Seat 6
Seat established on March 18, 1966 by 80 Stat. 75
Cassibry	1966–1984
Livaudais, Jr.	1984–1996
Seat reassigned to Middle District on October 6, 1997 by 111 Stat. 1173

Seat 7
Seat established on March 18, 1966 by 80 Stat. 75
Rubin	1966–1977
Collins	1978–1993
Porteous, Jr.	1994–2010
Morgan	2012–present

Seat 8
Seat established on March 18, 1966 by 80 Stat. 75
Comiskey	1967–1975
Sear	1976–2000
Engelhardt	2001–2018
Guidry	2019–present

Seat 9
Seat established on June 2, 1970 by 84 Stat. 294
R. West	1971–1978
Duplantier, Sr.	1978–1994
Fallon	1995–2024
Crain	2025–present

Seat 10
Seat established on June 2, 1970 by 84 Stat. 294
Gordon	1971–1982
Feldman	1983–2022
Long	2023–present

Seat 11
Seat established on October 20, 1978 by 92 Stat. 1629
Carr	1979–1991
Berrigan	1994–2016
Vitter	2019–present

Seat 12
Seat established on October 20, 1978 by 92 Stat. 1629
Arceneaux, Jr.	1979–1993
Duval, Jr.	1994–2008
Brown	2011–present

Seat 13
Seat established on October 20, 1978 by 92 Stat. 1629
Wicker	1979–1994
Lemelle	1998–2015
Ashe	2018–present

Seat 14
Seat established on October 20, 1978 by 92 Stat. 1629
Beer	1979–1994
Lemmon	1996–2011
Milazzo	2011–present

== List of U.S. Attorneys ==
The U.S. Attorney is the chief law-enforcement officer for the district.

- John W. Smith (1821–1829)
- John Slidell (1829–1833)
- Henry Carlton (1833–1836)
- P. K. Lawrence (1836–1837)
- Thomas Slidell (1837–1838)
- Benjamin F. Linton (1838–1841)
- Balie Peyton (1841–1845)
- Solomon W. Downs (1845–1846)
- Thomas I. Durant (1846–1850)
- Logan Hunton (1850–1853)
- E. Warren Moise (1853–1855)
- Thomas S. McCay (1855–1856)
- Franklin H. Clack (1856–1857)
- Thomas J. Semmes (1857–1859)
- Henry C. Miller (1859–1863)
- Rufus Waples (1863)
- James R. Beckwith (1870)
- Albert H. Leonard (1878–1885)
- Charles Parlange (1885–1889)
- William Grant (1889–1892)
- Ferdinand B. Earhart (1892–1896)
- J. Ward Gurley Jr. (1896–1900)
- William W. Howe (1900–1907)
- Rufus E. Foster (1907–1909)
- Carlton R. Beattie (1909–1913)
- Walter Guion (1913–1917)
- Joseph W. Montgomery (1917–1919)
- Henry Mooney (1919–1921)
- Louis H. Burns (1921–1925)
- Wayne G. Borah (1925–1928)
- Edmond E. Talbot (1928–1933)
- William H. Norman (1933)
- Rene A. Viosca (1933–1934)
- Warren Doyle (1934–1937)
- Herbert W. Christenberry (1937–1941)
- Robert Winestein (1941–1947)
- J. Skelly Wright (1948–1949)
- John M. McKay (1949–1950)
- George R. Blue (1950–1953)
- M. Hepburn Many (1953–1957)
- Kathleen Ruddell (1957–1961)
- Louis C. LaCour (1967–1969)
- Gerald J. Gallinghouse (1969–1978)
- John P. Volz (1978–1991)
- Harry A. Rosenberg (1991–93)
- Robert J. Boitmann (1993)
- Eddie J. Jordan Jr. (1994–2001)
- Jim Letten (2001–2012)
- Dana Boente (2012–2013)
- Kenneth Polite (2013–2017)
- Duane A. Evans (2017–2018)
- Peter G. Strasser (2018–2021)
- Duane A. Evans (2021–2025)
- Michael M. Simpson (acting) (2025)
- David Courcelle (2025-Present)

== See also ==
- Courts of Louisiana
- List of current United States district judges
- List of United States federal courthouses in Louisiana
- United States Court of Appeals for the Fifth Circuit
- United States District Court for the Middle District of Louisiana
- United States District Court for the Western District of Louisiana
