= Loyola University New Orleans College of Law =

Law school in New Orleans, Louisiana, US

Coordinates: 29.9369°N 90.1286°W

Loyola University College of Law
- Established: 1914
- School type: Private
- Dean: Madeleine Landrieu
- Location: New Orleans, Louisiana, United States
- Enrollment: 850
- USNWR ranking: 130th (tie) (2024)
- Website: https://law.loyno.edu

Loyola University New Orleans College of Law is a private law school in New Orleans, Louisiana, affiliated with Loyola University New Orleans. Loyola's law school opened in 1914 and is now located on the Broadway Campus of the university in the historic Audubon Park District of the city. The College of Law is one of fourteen Jesuit law schools in the United States. It is also one of the few law schools in the nation to offer curricula in both Civil Law and Common Law. The school releases several academic journals, most notable of which is the Loyola Law Review.

== History ==
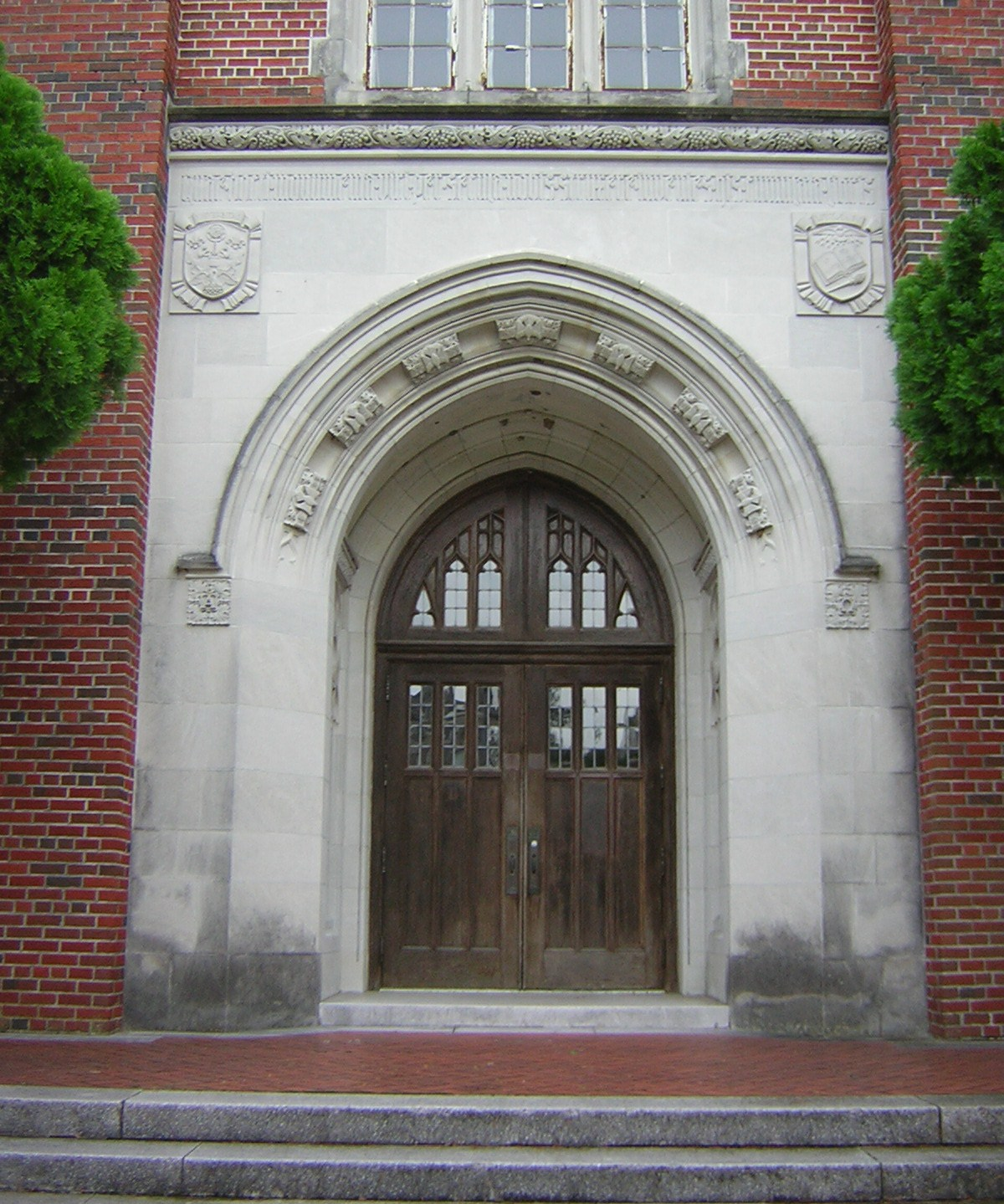
Entrance to the Memorial Library on the main campus, which housed the Law Library from 1915 to 1986

The College of Law was founded as the School of Law as one of the earliest academic departments of Loyola University New Orleans, chartered in 1912. Judge John St. Paul was the founding dean, "choosing the faculty and preparing the curriculum". The first session of the School of Law occurred on October 5, 1914; it originally held classes only in the evening and was located downtown at the College of the Immaculate Conception, now known as Jesuit High School. The School of Law was then moved uptown to the St. Charles Avenue campus of Loyola in 1915. In 1925, the law school opened a day division to better serve the needs of its students, as the coursework was expanded to a four-year program. In 1931, the law school became a member of the American Bar Association and became a member of the Association of American Law Schools in 1934. In 1986, the law school moved from the main campus to its current location on the Broadway Campus, only a few blocks away (located on the west side of the Audubon Park).

The School of Law was renamed the College of Law with the passage of the PATHWAYS Plan on May 19, 2006. In 2007, the law school completed a new four-story 16,000-square-foot (1,500 m^{2}) addition to its current building, which increased the number of classrooms, office space and library space.

== Ranking ==
According to the law professor blog, The Faculty Lounge, based on 2012 ABA data, only 48.6% of graduates obtained full-time, long term, bar admission required positions (i.e., jobs as lawyers), nine months after graduation, ranking 135th out of 197 law schools.

== Academics ==
The school is known for its success in national and international moot court competitions. The college houses the Gillis Long Poverty Law Center, a legal research and education center; William P. Quigley is the current director.

The school's Sports and Entertainment Law Society provides students interested in legal careers in music, film, and sports with unique opportunities to meet and learn from experts in these respective areas. The school also runs the Stuart H. Smith Law Clinic and Center For Social Justice, where students are admitted to the limited practice of law under a supervising attorney's license for their 3L year. Through the Clinic, students are able to work in a variety of practice areas including criminal defense, prosecution, family law, employment law, immigration, and mediation and arbitration.

=== Study abroad programs ===
Loyola Law has had a long history of contacts with civil law schools in other parts of the world. As a result, Loyola has one of the most extensive catalog of study abroad programs in the country. These programs draw students from many other law schools in the country. With the school's special focus on the study of international law, over the course of the years, programs have established in the following countries:

- Budapest, Hungary
- Moscow, Russia
- Panama City, Panama
- Rio de Janeiro, Brazil - inactive until summer 2017
- Spetses, Greece
- Vienna, Austria

== Employment prospects ==
According to the College of Law's 2022 ABA-required disclosures, 79% of the Class of 2022 obtained full-time, long-term, bar passage-required employment nine months after graduation, excluding solo practitioners. The College of Law's Law School Transparency under-employment score was 18.4%, indicating the percentage of the Class of 2021 that was unemployed, pursuing an additional degree, or working in a non-professional, short-term, or part-time job nine months after graduation.

== Costs ==
The total cost of attendance (indicating the cost of tuition, fees, and living expenses) at the College of Law for full-time students not living at home for the 2013–2014 academic year is $64,132. The Law School Transparency estimated debt-financed cost of attendance for three years is $253,149.

== Notable alumni ==
- Robert A. Ainsworth Jr. (L '32), former Louisiana state senator 1952–1961, serving as president pro tem 1952–56 and 1960–61, former federal judge for the United States District Court for the Eastern District of Louisiana 1961–1966, and former federal judge for the United States Court of Appeals for the Fifth Circuit 1966–1981
- Carl Barbier (L '70), federal judge, United States District Court for the Eastern District of Louisiana
- Morris Bart, well-known Louisiana attorney
- Henry Braden (L '75), state senator from Orleans Parish and African Americans' rights activist
- Phillip D. Brady (L '76), former deputy assistant to the president and director of cabinet affairs at the White House
- Pascal F. Calogero Jr. (L '54), former chief justice of the Louisiana Supreme Court
- Anh "Joseph" Cao (L '00), first Vietnamese-American elected to the United States Congress
- Dan Claitor (L '87), member of the Louisiana State Senate from Baton Rouge
- Patrick Connick (L '93), state representative from Jefferson Parish
- Dana Douglas (L '00), circuit judge of the United States Court of Appeals for the Fifth Circuit; former magistrate judge of the United States District Court for the Eastern District of Louisiana
- Hunt Downer (L '72), former speaker of the Louisiana House of Representatives; assistant adjutant general of the Louisiana National Guard
- Adrian G. Duplantier (L '49), former state senator and federal judge of the United States District Court for the Eastern District of Louisiana
- Charles Foti (L '65), former attorney general of Louisiana
- Edwin Foulke (L '78), U.S. assistant secretary of labor
- Norman Francis (L '55), current president of Xavier University and Presidential Medal of Freedom recipient; first African American to enroll at Loyola Law
- Kim Gandy (L '78), current president of the National Organization for Women (NOW)
- Ray Garofalo, current member of the Louisiana House of Representatives from St. Bernard Parish
- Robert T. Garrity Jr., state representative for Jefferson Parish District 79, 1988–1992
- James T. Genovese (L '74), associate justice of the Louisiana Supreme Court
- William J. Guste (L, '44), state senator 1968–1972 and Louisiana attorney general 1972–1992
- Richard T. Haik (L), U.S. district judge in Lafayette
- Ted Haik (L), former state representative from Iberia Parish, current city attorney in New Iberia
- Jeannette Knoll (L '69), associate justice of the Louisiana Supreme Court
- Mitch Landrieu (L), former lieutenant governor of Louisiana; former mayor of New Orleans
- Moon Landrieu (L '54), former New Orleans mayor and U.S. secretary of Housing and Urban Development
- Harry Lee (L '67), former sheriff of Jefferson Parish
- Carl E. Stewart (L '74), circuit judge, and former chief circuit judge, of the United States Court of Appeals for the Fifth Circuit; former judge of the Louisiana Court of Appeal for the Second Circuit
- Suzanne Haik Terrell (L '84), former Louisiana commissioner of elections; former member of the New Orleans City Council, former candidate for the U.S. Senate, sister of Richard and Ted Haik
- Chet D. Traylor (L '74), Louisiana Supreme Court associate justice, 1997–2009
- Mary Ann Vial Lemmon (L' 64), federal judge, United States District Court for the Eastern District of Louisiana
- Louis Westerfield (L' 74), served as the first African-American dean of the University of Mississippi School of Law
- Robert Wilkie (L '88), former United States assistant secretary of defense, former under secretary of defense for personnel and readiness, and former U.S. secretary of veterans affairs
- Edwin E. Willis, member of the United States House of Representatives from Louisiana's 3rd congressional district 1949–1969
- J. Skelly Wright ('32, L '34), former federal district judge of the United States District Court for the Eastern District of Louisiana 1950–1962, former judge of the U.S. Court of Appeals for the District of Columbia 1962–1988, serving as chief circuit judge 1986–1988

== See also ==
- American Bar Association profile
