= Highfield =

Highfield may refer to:

== Places ==
Places in England

- Highfield, Bolton
- Highfield, Burntwood, an electoral ward in Lichfield District, Staffordshire
- Highfield, Derbyshire
- Highfield, Gloucestershire
- Highfield, Southampton, a suburb
- Highfield, Hertfordshire, a neighbourhood in Hemel Hempstead and an electoral ward in the borough of Dacorum
- Highfield, Oxfordshire
- Highfield, Sheffield, a neighbourhood in City ward, Sheffield
- Highfield, Tyne & Wear
- Highfield, Wigan
- Highfield, North Yorkshire
- Highfield Boarding House, Uppingham School
- Highfield (Blackpool ward), an electoral ward in Blackpool; part of Blackpool South constituency
- Highfield (Enfield ward), Enfield, London
- Highfield (Halton ward), an electoral ward in the borough of Halton; part of Widnes and Halewood constituency

Places in Northern Ireland

- Highfield, Belfast

Places in Scotland

- Highfield, North Ayrshire

Places in United States of America

- Highfield-Cascade, Maryland

Places in Zimbabwe

- Highfield, Harare
- Highfield (constituency)

Places in New Zealand

- Highfield, New Zealand

== Other uses ==
- Highfield (surname)
- Highfield (Birmingham) - focus of a notable literary scene in the 1930s
- Highfield Leadership Academy, a secondary school in Blackpool, England
- Highfield Road, a former association football stadium in Coventry, England
- The Highfield School, a secondary school in Letchworth, England
- Highfield (stadium) - a former home stadium of The Wednesday F.C., probably the site of the present Highfield library, Sheffield
- London Highfield, a rugby league team
