= Highfields School =

Highfields School may refer to:

- Highfields School, Matlock, a secondary school in Matlock.
- Highfields School, Wolverhampton, a secondary school in Wolverhampton, West Midlands, England
- Highfields Private School, Cornwall, a former independent school in Redruth, Cornwall.

== See also ==
- The Highfield School
- Highfields (disambiguation)
