= Highfields =

Highfields may refer to:

== Places ==
Australia

- Highfields, New South Wales
- Highfields, Queensland

United Kingdom

- Highfields, Cambridgeshire
- Highfields, Derbyshire
- Highfields, Leicestershire, an inner-city neighbourhood of Leicester
- Highfields, South Yorkshire

== Other uses ==
- Highfields, Buerton, a country house in Cheshire, England
- Highfields (Amwell and Hopewell, New Jersey), the former home of Charles Lindbergh

== See also ==
- Highfield (disambiguation)
- Highfields School (disambiguation)
