= Barkip =

Coordinates: 55.725614°N 4.666426°W

Barkip: Scottish Gaelic: Bàrr Ceipe; Scots: Barkip/The Den; The Den
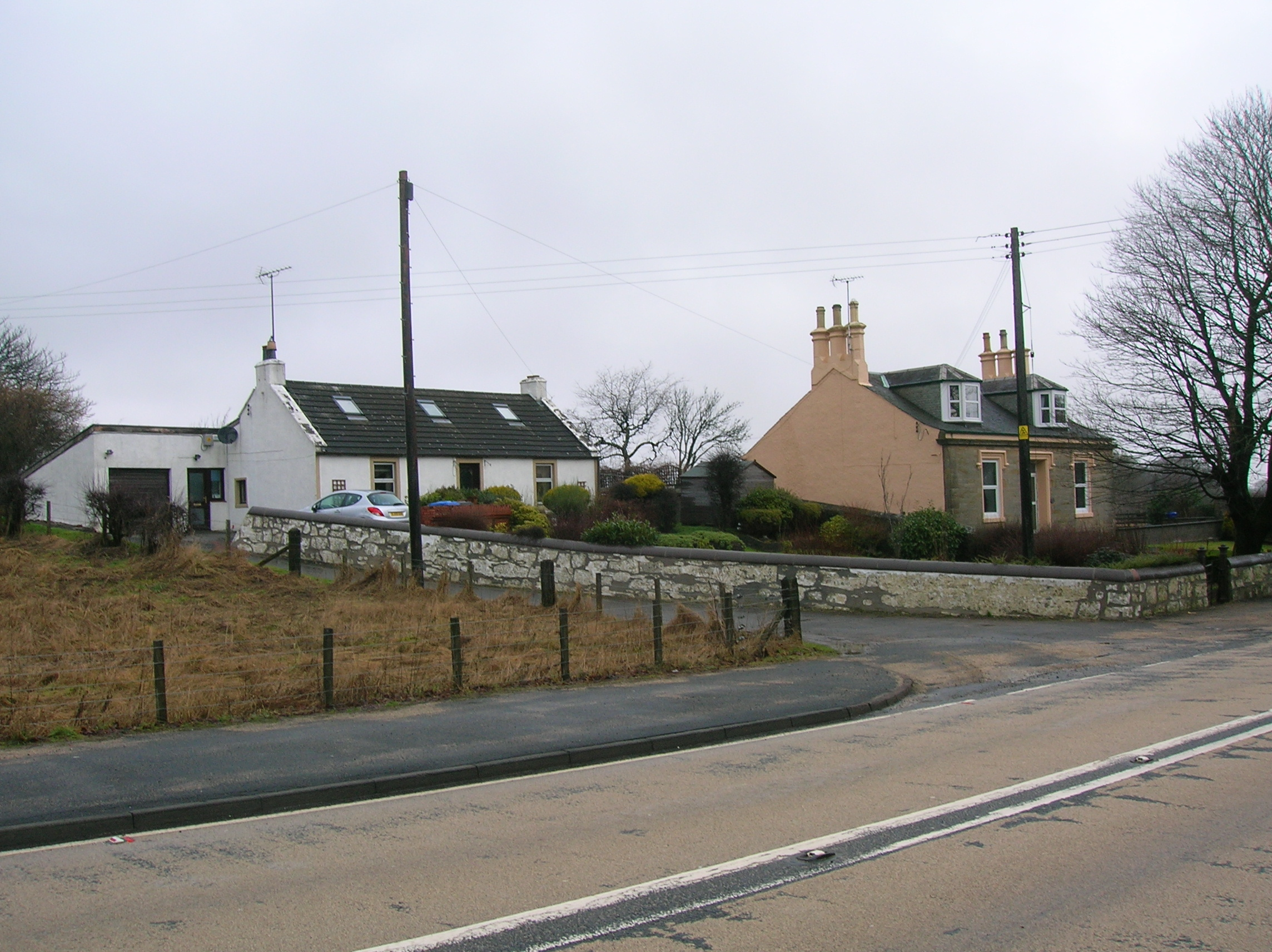
- A view of The Den

- Location within North Ayrshire
- OS grid reference: NS 32640 51244
- Council area: North Ayrshire
- Lieutenancy area: Ayrshire and Arran
- Country: Scotland
- Sovereign state: United Kingdom
- Dialling code: 01505
- Police: Scotland
- Fire: Scottish
- Ambulance: Scottish
- UK Parliament: Central Ayrshire
- Scottish Parliament: Cunninghame South

Barkip, also known as The Den, is a hamlet in North Ayrshire, Scotland about three miles (five kilometres) southwest of Beith on the A737 road to Dalry. The earliest recorded name is 'Blairkip'. In the Gaelic language, the name Barkip comes from bar ("top"), and kip ("a rank of soldiers"). It is not clear when or why the name 'The Den' started to be used although it appears in the local press as both in 1898, however in Scots as in old English one meaning is 'A hollow between hills,' which is certainly an accurate description of the geography of the area that Barkip lies in. Following construction of a new road, Barkip no longer sits on the main Beith to Dalry road.

== History ==
Pont's survey of the early 1600s records a 'Bar-Kyipe' lying in the Barony of Kersland and Dobie records that Barkip formed part of the estate of Roughwood in 1874, belonging to William Ralston-Patrick. In the 19th century the population was 995.

Willem Blaeu's map of circa 1604 records a 'Barkirsh' settlement, probably today's nearby 'Barcosh'. William Roy's map of 1747 records the settlements of Mallside and a Blairkip. In the year 1726, William Park and John his son granted to John Hamilton an heritable bond, in common form, for 3000 merks, over the lands of Barkip. Barkip was part of the Blair Estate.

In March 1898, a local paper reported a complaint that a dance had taken place at the Kersland Barony school and Kirk that had lasted into the small hours. Members of the church congregation threatened to leave through their indignation at the building being used for such frivolous activities. That same month, students at the Kersland Barony evening continuation classes presented their teachers, Mr Deans and Miss Lorraine, with gifts of appreciation. The Rev A Leslie chaired the event and Miss Lorraine was presented with an inscribed umbrella, whilst Mr Deans had a silver walking stick as his recognition. Songs, recitations, flute, and violin entertainments were part of the night's proceedings.

An 1876 publication, Catalogue of the western Scottish fossils, documented finds in Barkip's coal and ironstone pits and sandstone quarries, including that of Rhizodus, Gyracanthus, and Cladodus. The village had a certain reputation for problems linked to illicit drinking. It was reported in 1898 that Sunday drinking resulted in men lying around drunk in the Maulside plantations and some were playing cards. Jame Walker is recorded as being born on 4 September 1795 and lived at 20 Fore Row, 23 Barkip, The Den.

== Geography ==
Geologically, Barkip consists of mainly sandstone. Two areas of the rare habitat type known as 'raised bogs' are located at Barkip and Little Barkip. These were surveyed for the Ayrshire Biodiversity Action Plan (ABAP) by the NAC Ranger Service in 2010. Raised bogs develop over centuries from open lake, to marsh, and eventually bog that continues to form peat, and over time a shallow dome of bog peat develops: a raised bog. The dome is typically a few metres high in the centre, and is often surrounded by strips of fen. The Barkip sites have the typical bog plants, such as sundew, cotton grass, deer grass, and sphagnum mosses. Highfield is the next village along on the A737 towards Dalry.

== Notable landmarks ==
The old Kersland Barony school had a church-like belfry over the front gale and was used as church on Sundays. The Rev. Robert Stevenson D.D., minister of Dalry 1844–1890, caused to be erected the Kersland Barony Chapel and school. He bequeathed £2,500 for Kersland Barony chapel. In 1901 the Herald recorded that "The scholars of Kersland Barony School, Dalry, under the direction of Mr Deans, headmaster, and Mr Gibson, drill instructor, gave a most enjoyable entertainment on two evenings last week". The village at one time had a police station, two public houses, a cinema, and a bowling green. Brackenhills railway station was located midway between Beith and Barkip on the Lanarkshire and Ayrshire Railway's branch to Kilbirnie South. Defence Munitions Beith (DM Beith) is located nearby. The hamlet contains several cottages including Auchengree Cottage, Rosehill Cottage and Muirhouse Cottage. A smithy was located at the Crossroads near where Graze Restaurant once stood. A second smithy was situated on the crossroads near West Muirhouse Farm and Highden House. This smithy, now demolished, was unusual in that it had stables associated with it; these survive as a private dwelling. An explosives magazine was located at the site of the old Low Well opposite West Muirhouse Farm. Davidshill House was once an isolation hospital, locally known as the 'Sick House'.

Maulside House, previously Maulhead, was built on the site of an earlier mansion held by the Russells. The present house was built for Andrew Mitchell, Writer to the signet, in the 1830s. he improved his estate lands, draining the mosses, turning them into productive fields. Maulside Mains is a 'B' Listed, early 19th century, rectangular-plan stable block with a U-shaped courtyard beyond. William Ronald, farmer at Mauleside, had been a gauds boy to Burns at Lochlea Farm, helping him with the ploughing by encouraging and guiding the team of horses whilst carrying a plough staff to clean the ploughshare when it clogged with earth.

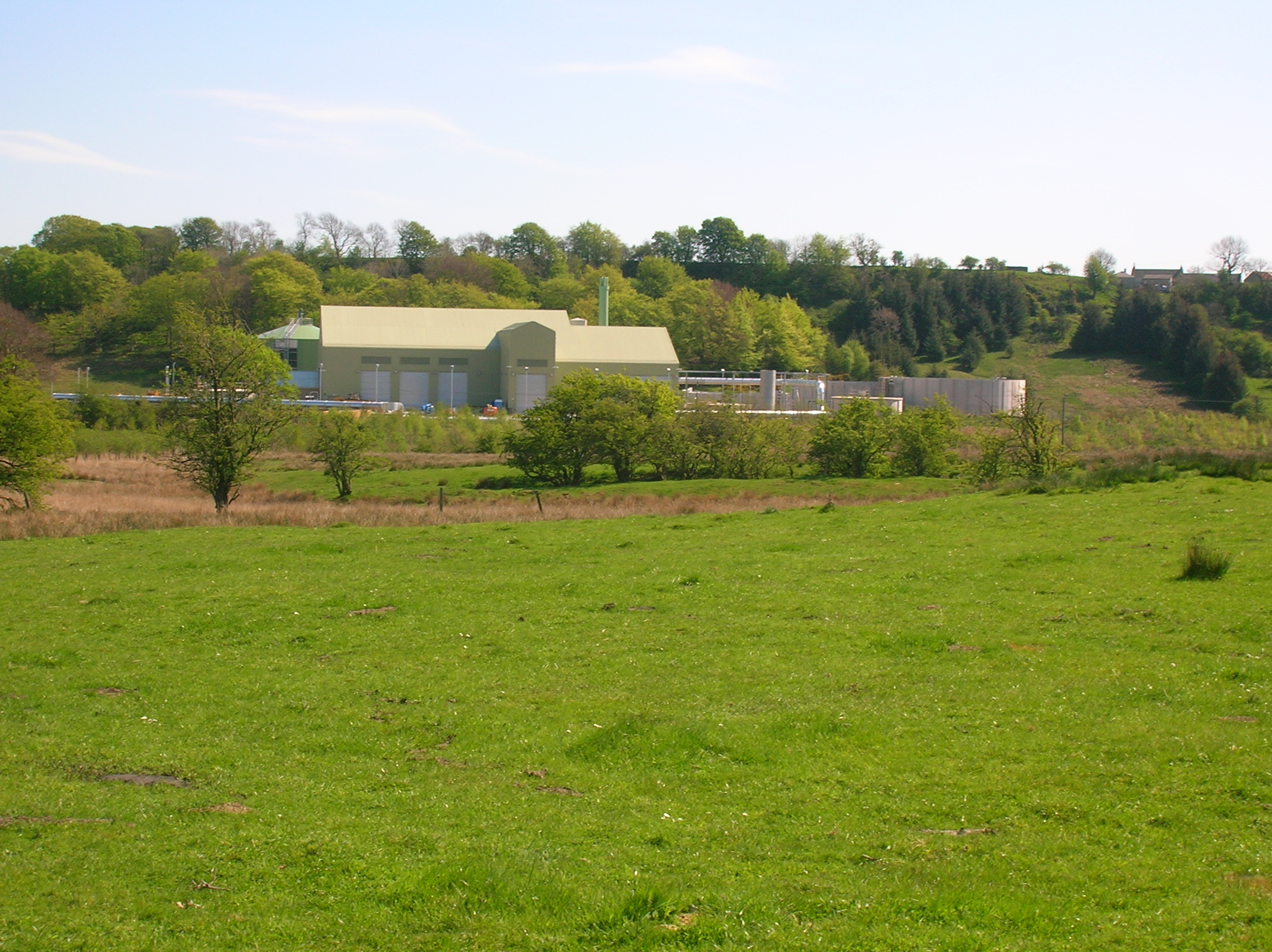
The Barkip Biogas Plant.

Located a short distance from the settlement is the Barkip Biogas power plant, the largest anaerobic digestion power plant in Scotland when completed in June 2011. It uses anaerobic digestion to produce electricity from leftover food and other organic materials. The only by-product is a high nutrient fertiliser that can be returned to the land to help produce more food. The Barkip Biogas facility was built for the utility provider Scottish & Southern Energy Generation Ltd. It is operated by Zebec Energy, a West of Scotland company. The facility has the capacity to process up to 75,000 tonnes-a-year of residual waste and has been designed to produce up to 2.5 megawatts (MW) of renewable electricity. The plant was officially opened by the Duke of Rothesay (Prince Charles) in May 2012.

== Notable people ==
- Jean Gilbert OBE, born at Barkip Farm in 1942 near The Den. North Ayrshire Council's 'Citizen of the Year' for 2012.
- David Mackie, superintending engineer for the Barkip Coal & Ironstone Works
- Thomas Macqueen, poet, author of " The Exile".
- Alexander McLaren managed an ironware and hardware shop at Barkip. He was injured at Portencross in the 1913 unsolved murder case that centred around his sister-in-law.
- Andrew Mitchell, Esq. of Maulside was recorded as one of the principal landowners within the Parish of Dalry. He was a Glasgow Writer to the Signet.
- William Ronald, farmer at Maulside and once a gauds boy to Robert Burns at Lochlie Farm.

== Views of Barkip in 2011 ==
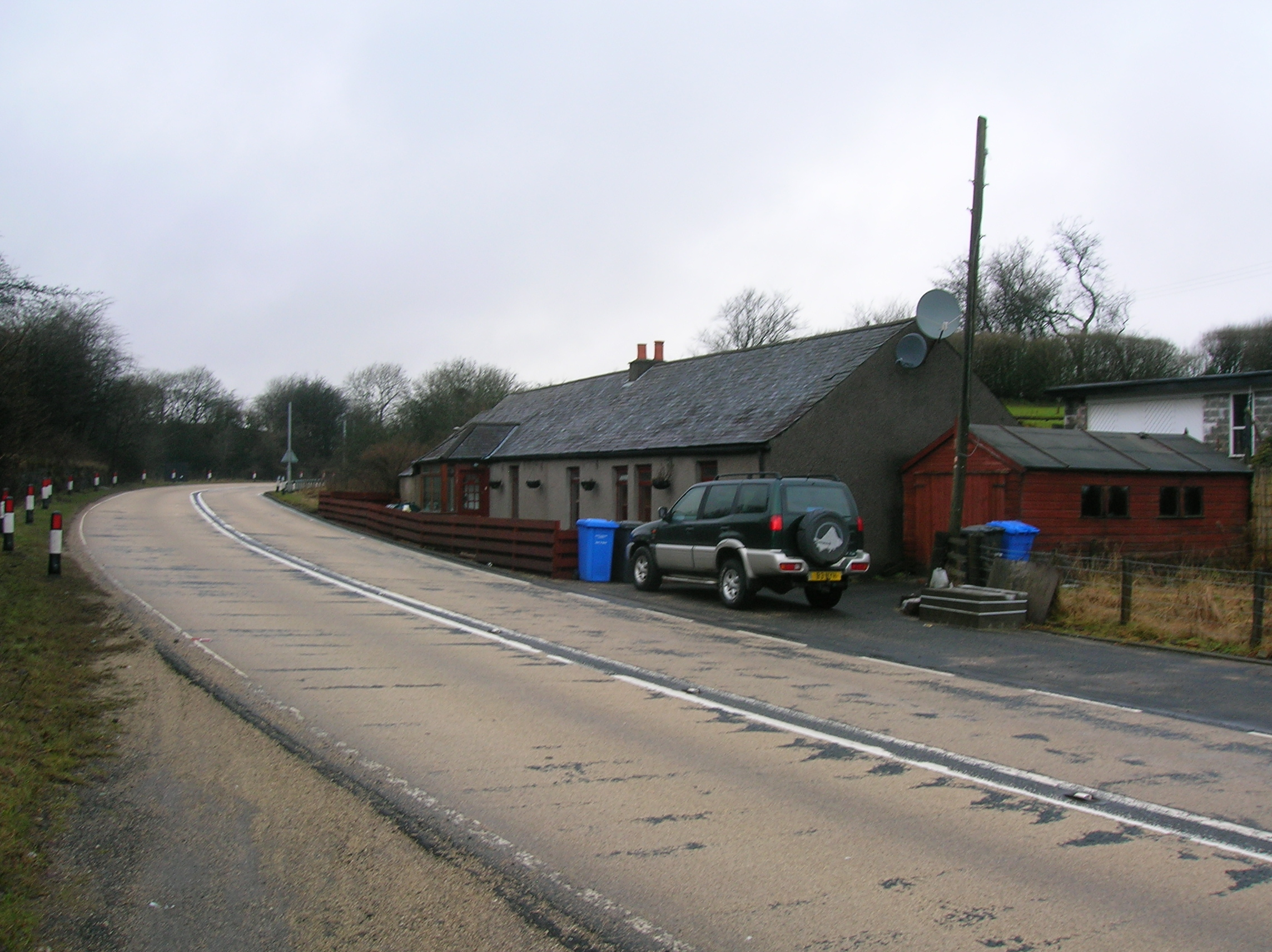
Looking north.

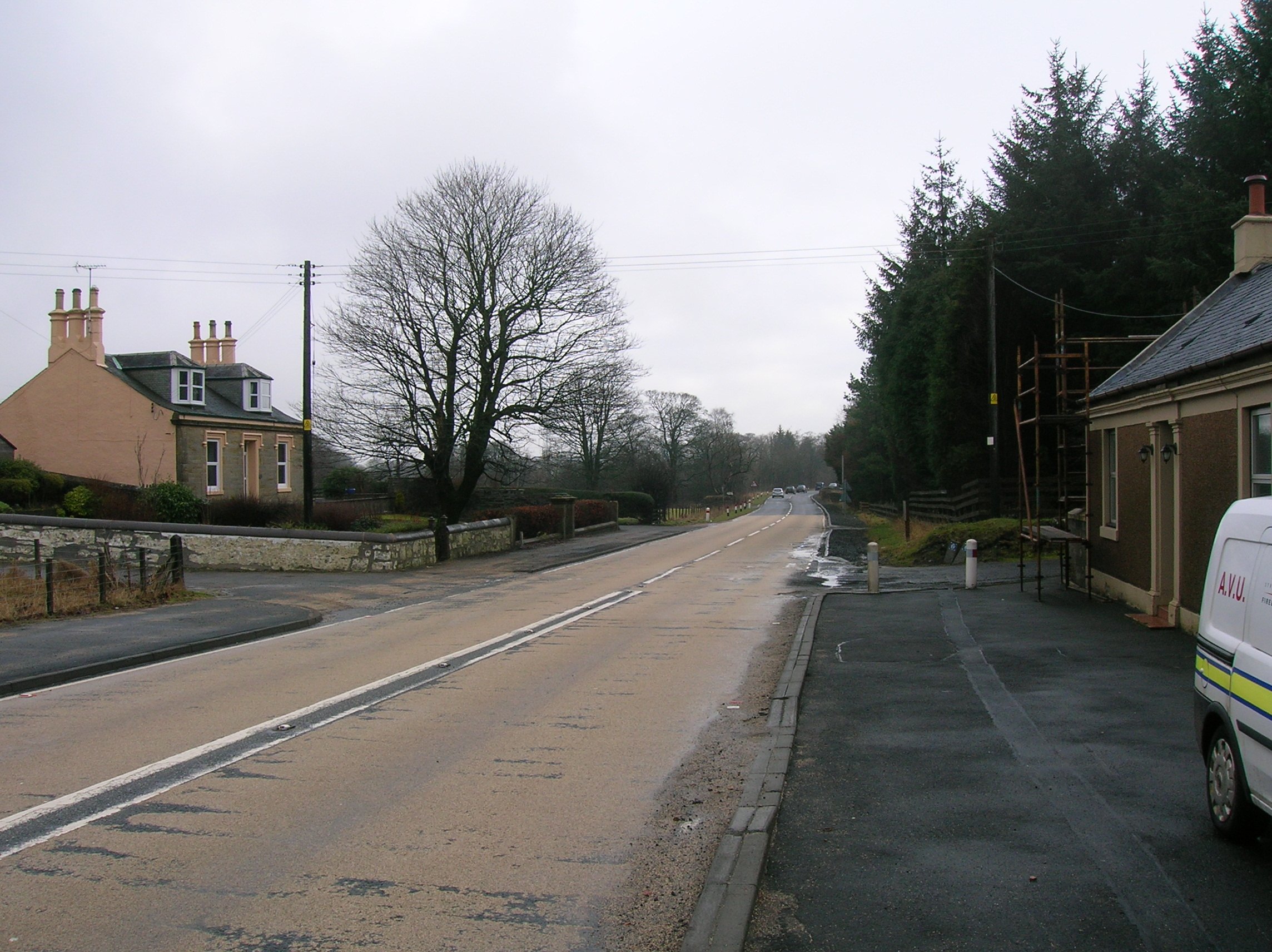
Looking towards Beith.

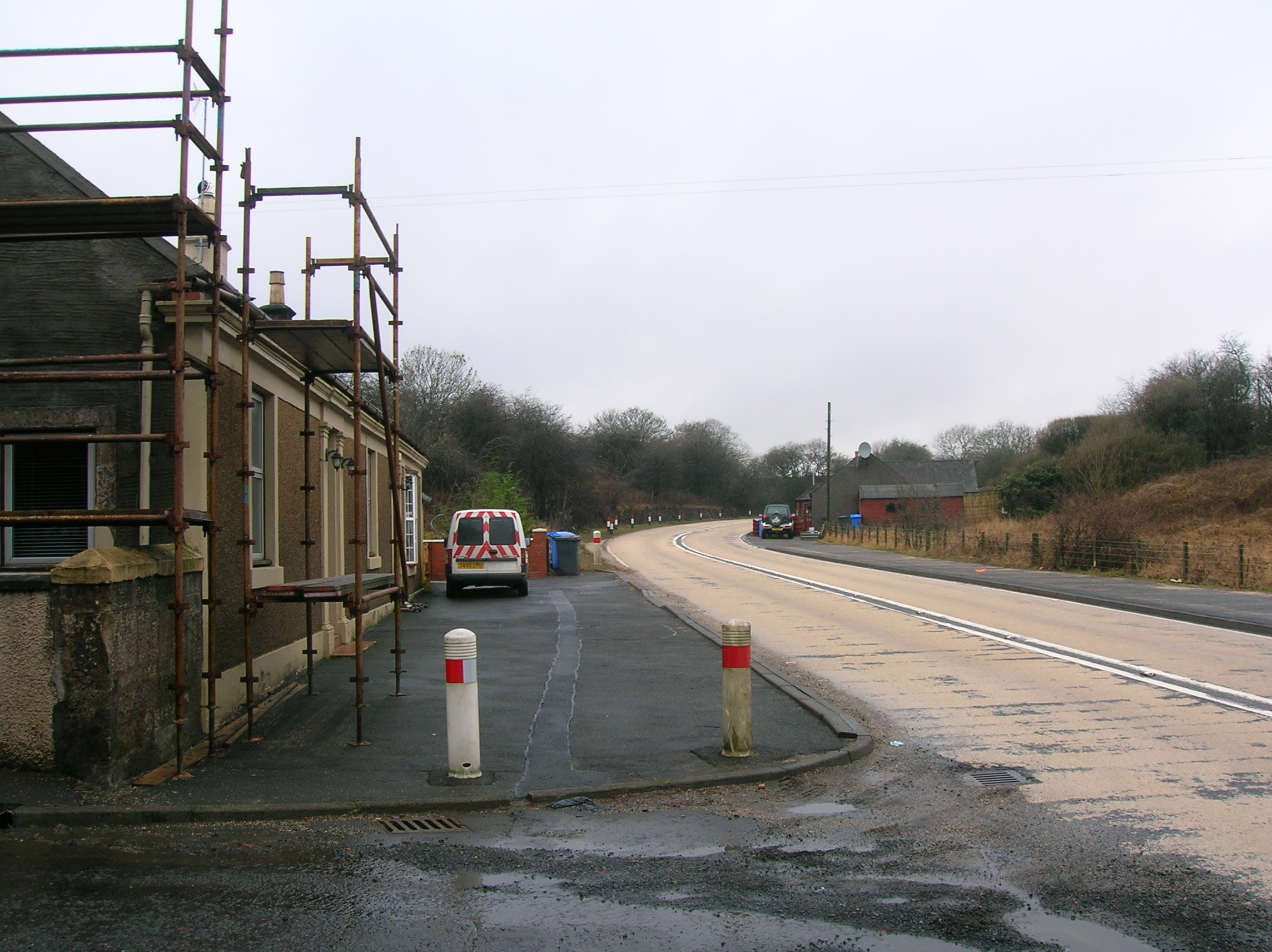
Looking towards Dalry.

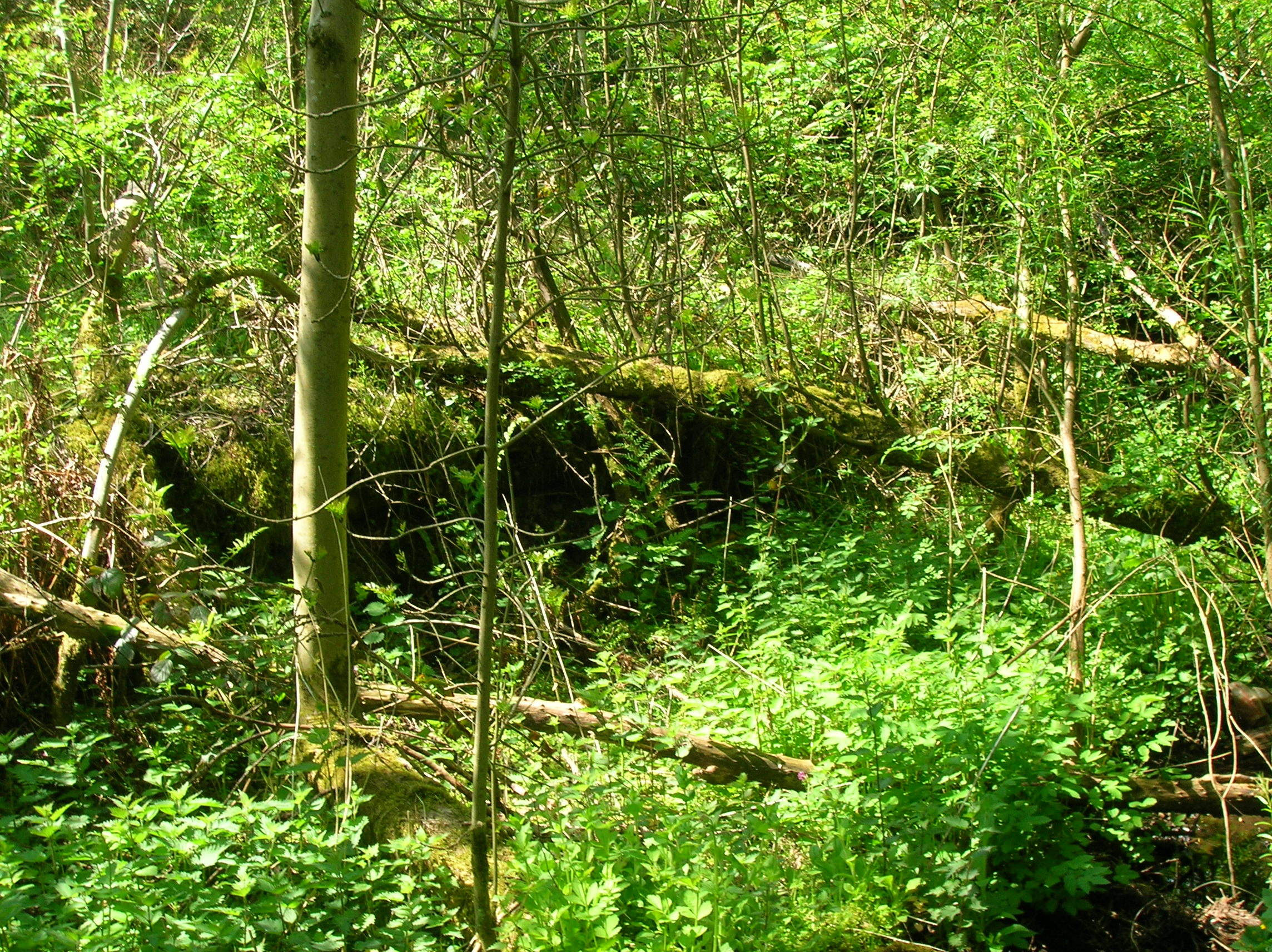
Remnants of Brackenhills station.

== The Den ==
Yin afternin I took a walk, frae Beith doon tae the Den,
Tw'as there I spent some happy days, but its many years since then,
The place its maist deserted noo, there's just a hoose or twa,
The office and the store are doon, and they hinna left a raw.

I daunert up the road a wee, and stood and lucket roon,
I couldna see a soul about, nor could I hear a soon,
An o'the Den is gey sair chinged, frae the Den that I hae seen,
When the pits were gaun an' the wee Flit Baun an' a senior fitba

The House that Jack built's stinnin yet, but noo it is the Co.,
The wee shop that Allan kept is doon long long ago.
The big Lawn's gone an' the Cobblers Shop, and Granny Walkers work
An' the wee Schill Raw its doon an a', that stood fornent the kirk.

The Auld Hoose is stinnin yet, we kent it best by Pugs,
But there's no a buddy rinnin noo, wi bottles or wi jugs.
For noo its lost its license, an' there's no a drap ava,
Though miny a bottle has been selt, through the wee hole in the wa'.

Up on the know at last I sclimed, an' stood an' lucked roon,
On the Meidow Heid, the Maulside an' the dear auld Boolin Green.
Then I turned roon the ither way, an' see the same auld schill,
But there's no a wain gaun tae it noo, an' aw the place is still.

When we were callans at the schill, an' got our holidays,
We ran about the heather moss, or up on Rabbie's Braes.
An' in Bumbo we had a dook, or up some bing would sclim,
Then hungry we would hurry hame, an' doon the Cullhill rin.

The happy days have lang since gone, we're no sae young ye ken,
When past our sixtieth milestone we're nearing journeys end,
An' noo am feeling kinda stiff, bit a wis soople then,
When I played fitba in the MA Alley, wae the callants o' the Den.

Of the old folk I remember, like the hooses now all gone,
With their weird and wonderous nicknames, still their memory lingers.
There was Stulty Bell, an' Fish Kate, Laddelty an' Lum,
The Cobbler, The Butcher, The Sailor an' Pug Young.

There was Tam the warmer CooCoo, Pluffy Deans an' Tam the Baker,
Auld Ooorie, an' Bummer, now all gone to their Maker,
An' as I stand at the corner, as I do now an' then,
It makes me very proud to say, I was born in the DEN.
