= Brackenhills railway station =

Disused railway station in Scotland

Brackenhills
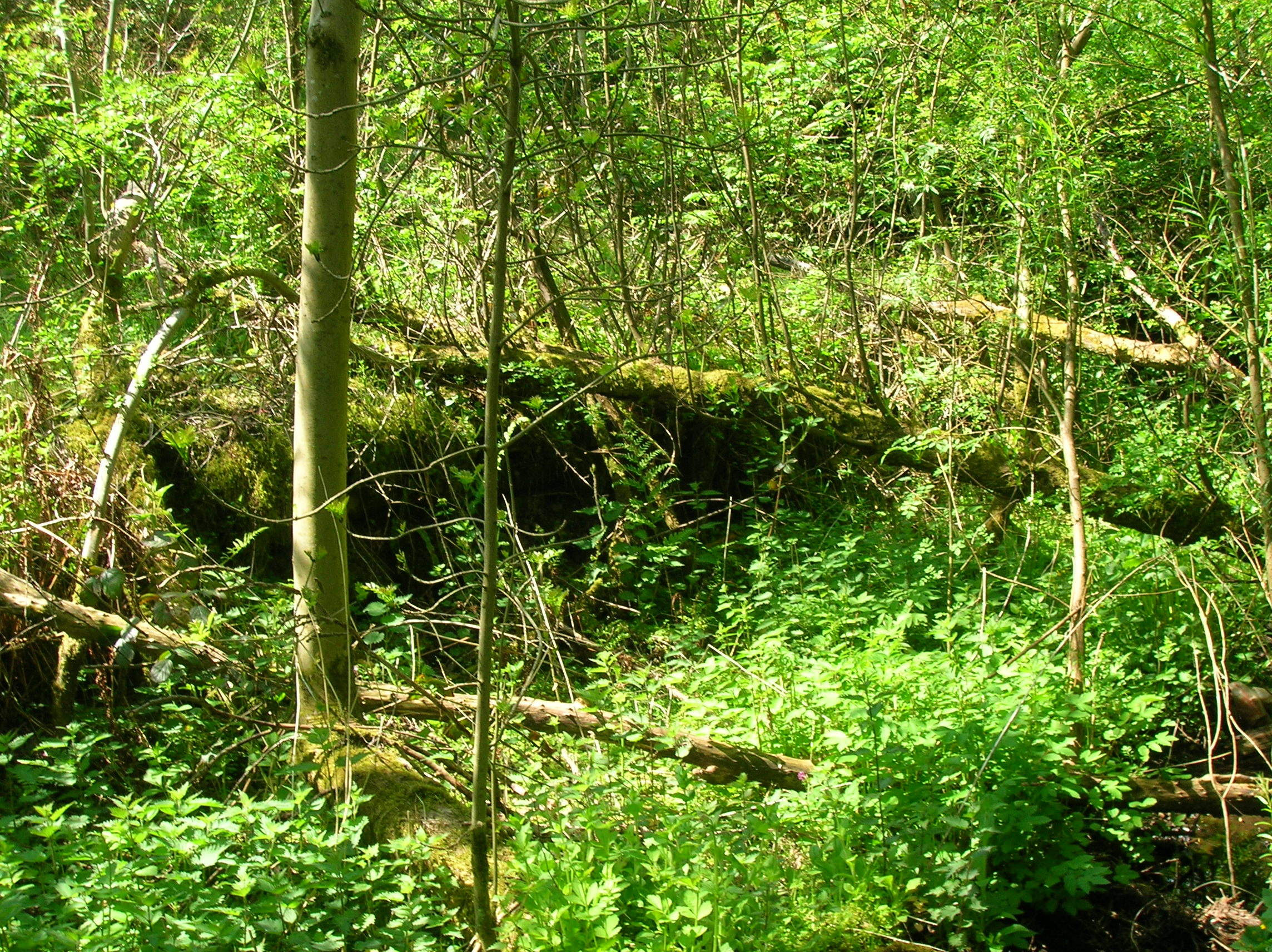
- Remains of the station platform in 2010

General information
- Location: Near Beith, Ayrshire; Scotland
- Coordinates: 55.7325°N 4.6502°W
- Grid reference: NS336519
- Platforms: 1

Other information
- Status: Disused

History
- Original company: Lanarkshire and Ayrshire Railway
- Pre-grouping: Caledonian Railway
- Post-grouping: LMS

Key dates
- 1 September 1906: Opened
- 1 December 1930: Closed
Location

Brackenhills railway station was a railway station approximately one mile south-west of the town of Beith, close to Barkip, North Ayrshire, Scotland, part of the Lanarkshire and Ayrshire Railway.

== History ==
The station opened on 1 September 1906 on the branch to Kilbirnie. The station closed on 1 December 1930.

Today the station platform still exists though it is overgrown and in very poor condition. The stationmaster's house is now a private residence.

The 1858 Ordnance Survey (OS) shows a 'weighing machine' at what was eventually to become Brackenhills railway station, related to the Hillhead Railway to Broadstone limestone quarry, the exchange and offloading bay for which were nearby. Many other ironstone and limestone also quarries existed in the immediate area. The 1897 OS map shows a 'Brackenhills Siding' at the site and the station is shown on the 1920s map.

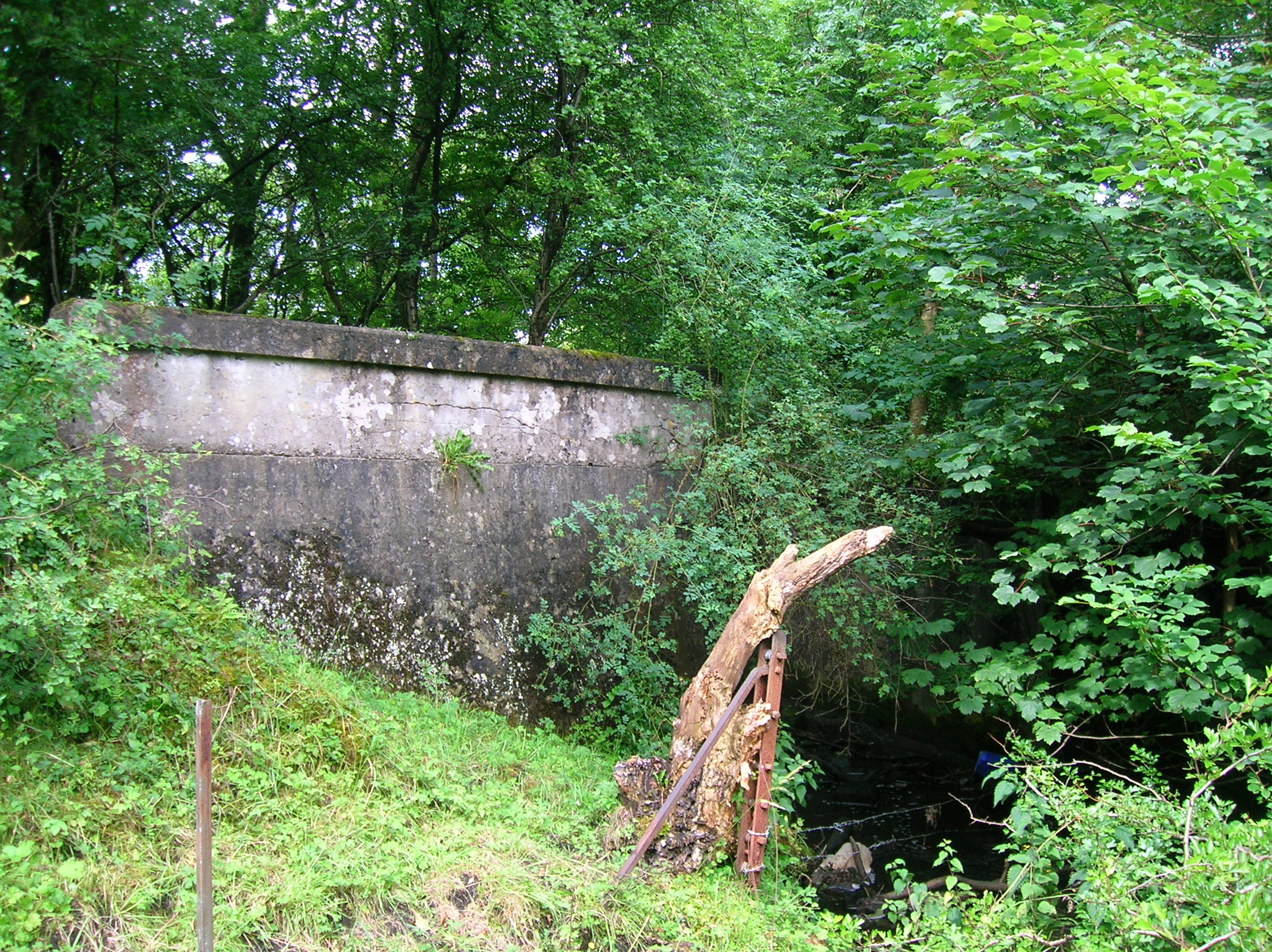
The nearby railway bridge over the Powgree Burn in the Kersland Glen.

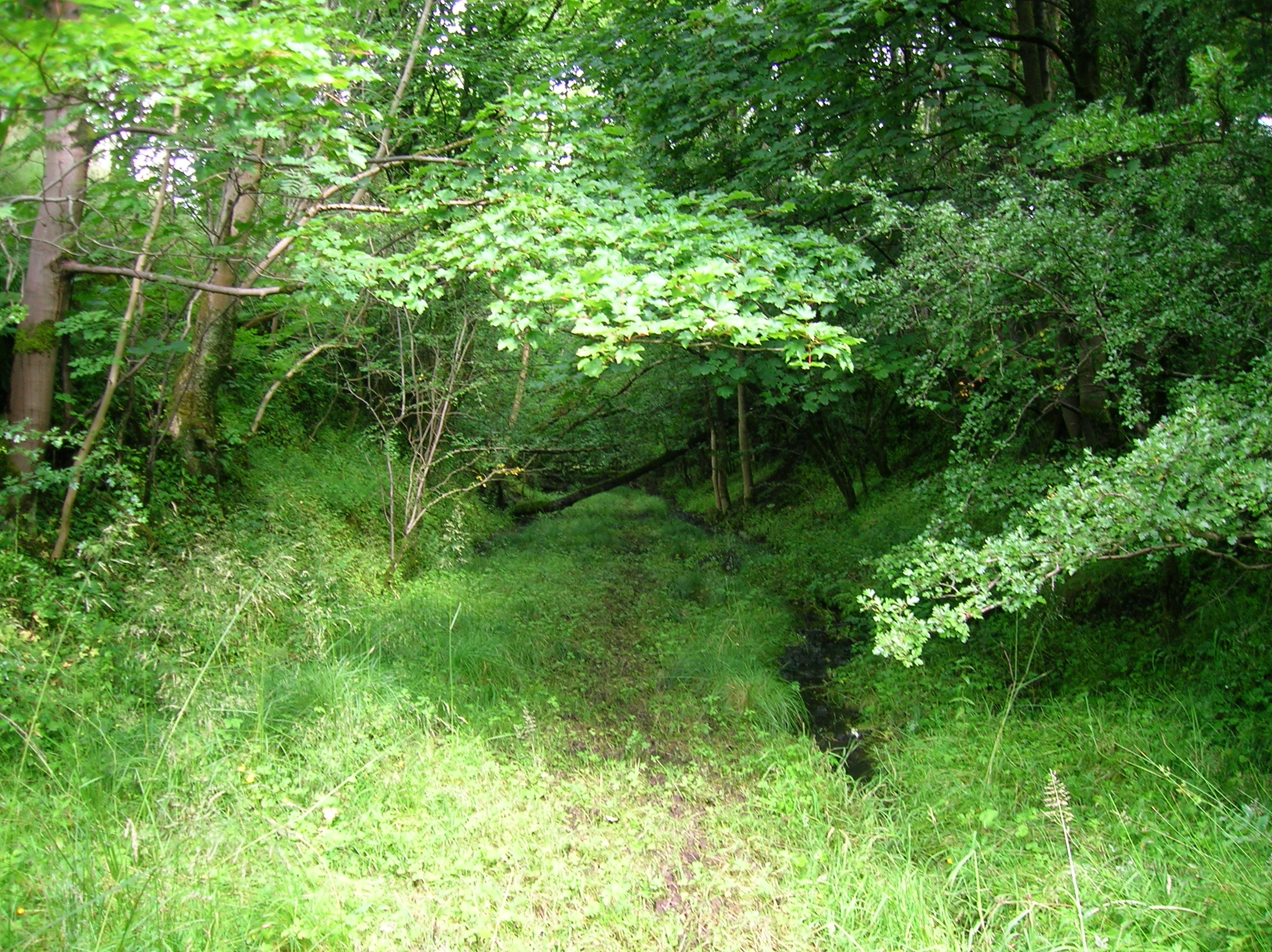
The old railway cutting running from Brackenhills into the Kersland Glen.

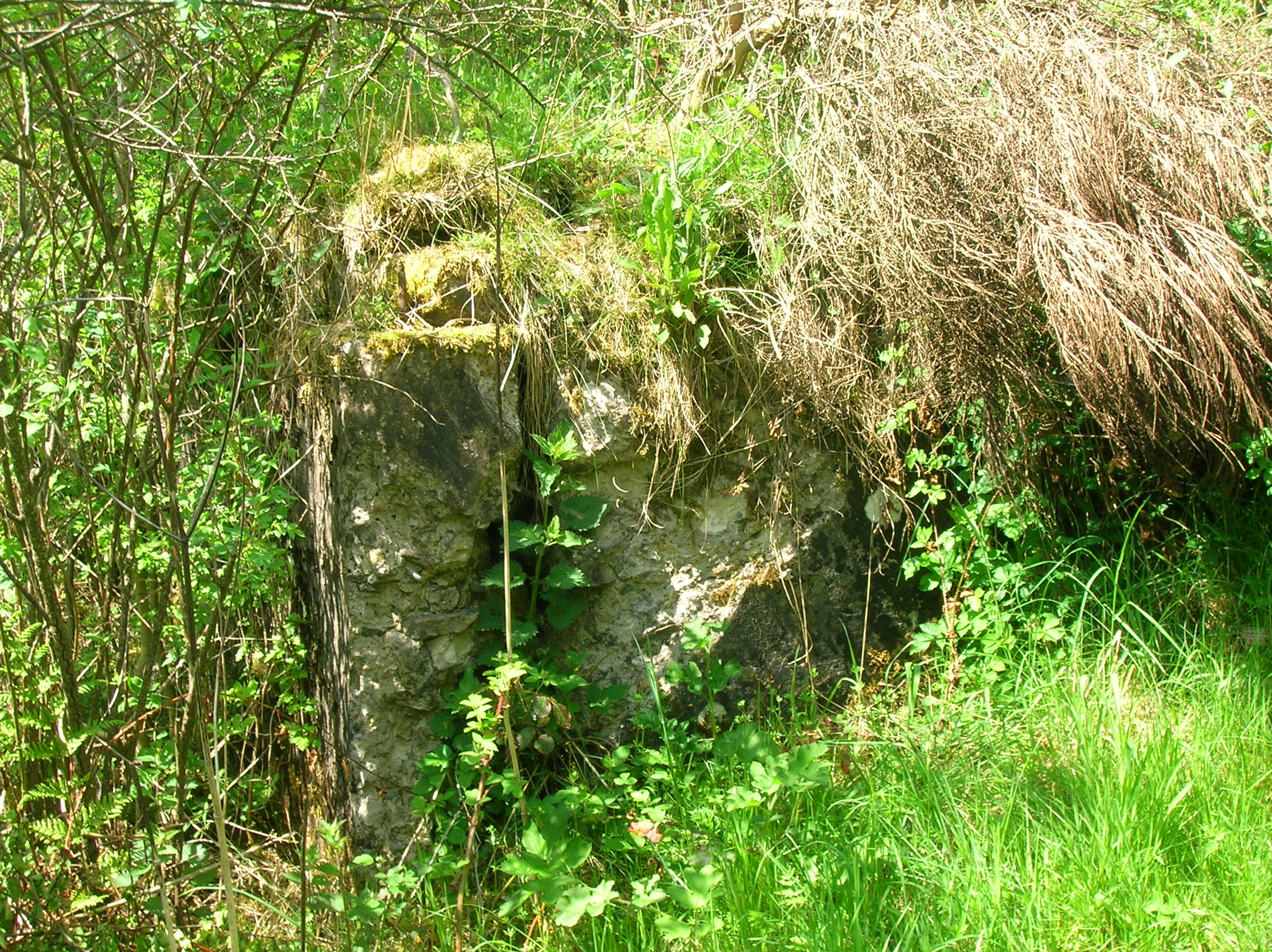
An exposed portion of the old loading dock in the goods yard area.

== Services ==
A shuttle service ran via this station on the way to Giffen from Kilbirnie and back, with around nine return journeys per day during the week and an extra two on Saturdays. In 1912 the local paper reported that 16 trains per day ran to Ardrossan and Glasgow Central station from Brackenhills.

== Freight ==
The LMS appendix records that

Brackenhills Station siding. - This siding may be worked by trains proceeding from Giffen towards Kilbirnie (South), and during shunting operations the points must be set for the siding and remain in that position until the work is completed.
This siding may also be worked by trains not exceeding 12 wagons and brake van coming from Glengarnock (High) and proceeding towards Giffen. In such cases the train must be taken inside the sidings, and no vehicle is to be left on the main branch line. The station master at Brackenhills must inform the signalman at Glengarnock (High) by telegraph when there is traffic to lift and the train must be signalled in accordance with Train Tablet Regulation 8.

| Preceding station | Historical railways | Following station |
|---|---|---|
| Glengarnock; Line and station closed | Caledonian Railway; Lanarkshire and Ayrshire Railway | Giffen; Line and station closed |
