= Kilbirnie (disambiguation) =

Kilbirnie is a town in Ayrshire, Scotland. Kilbirnie may also refer to:

== Australia ==
- Kilbirnie, Queensland, a locality in the Toowoomba Region, Australia

== New Zealand ==
- Kilbirnie, New Zealand, a suburb of Wellington

== Scotland ==
- Kilbirnie Loch, a freshwater lake
- Kilbirnie railway station, a former railway station
- Kilbirnie South railway station, a former railway station
- Barony and Castle of Kilbirnie, remains of an old castle
