= Glengarnock High railway station =

Former railway station in Scotland

Glengarnock High

General information
- Location: Glengarnock, Ayrshire; Scotland
- Coordinates: 55.7449°N 4.6793°W
- Grid reference: NS318534
- Platforms: 2

Other information
- Status: Disused

History
- Original company: Lanarkshire and Ayrshire Railway
- Pre-grouping: Caledonian Railway
- Post-grouping: London, Midland and Scottish Railway

Key dates
- 2 December 1889: Opened as Glengarnock
- 2 June 1924: Renamed Glengarnock High
- 1 December 1930: Closed
Location

Glengarnock High railway station was a railway station serving the village of Glengarnock, North Ayrshire, Scotland as part of the Lanarkshire and Ayrshire Railway.

== History ==
The station opened 2 December 1889 and was simply known as Glengarnock. Upon the grouping of the L&AR into the London, Midland and Scottish Railway in 1923, the station was renamed Glengarnock High on 2 June 1924. The station closed to passengers almost exactly forty one years after opening on 1 December 1930, however freight services remained until 1945.

== Services ==
A shuttle service ran via this station on the way to Giffen from Kilbirnie and back, with around nine return journeys per day during the week and an extra two on Saturdays.

Preceding station	Historical railways	Following station
Kilbirnie; Line and station closed	Caledonian Railway; Lanarkshire and Ayrshire Railway	Brackenhills; Line and station closed
