= Fearnhill School =

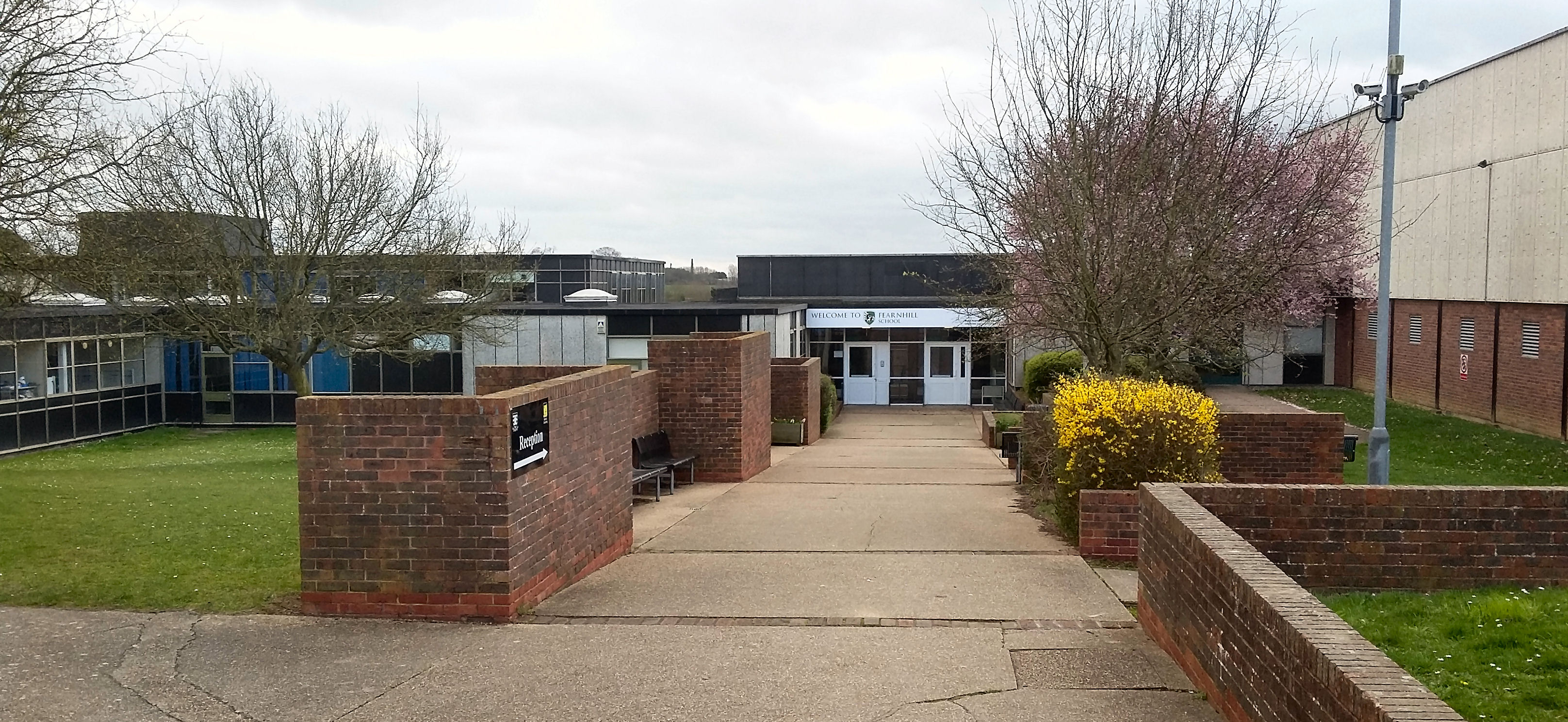
- Entrance to Fearnhill School in 2017

Location
- Icknield Way West; Letchworth, Hertfordshire, SG6 4BA; England; 51°58′35″N 0°14′51″W

Information
- Type: Foundation school
- Motto: Growing Excellence Every Day
- Local authority: Hertfordshire
- Department for Education URN: 117504 Tables
- Ofsted: Reports
- Headteacher: Tim Spencer
- Gender: Mixed
- Age: 11 to 18
- Enrolment: 516 as of November 2022
- Houses: 4 (Gorst, Pearsall, Howard and Neville)
- Colours: Yellow, purple, blue and red
- Publication: Fearnfile
- Website: http://www.fearnhill.herts.sch.uk/

Fearnhill School is a mixed secondary school and sixth form located in Letchworth, Hertfordshire, England.

== Admissions ==
Fearnhill School (formerly Letchworth Grammar School) is a foundation comprehensive school located in Letchworth Garden City. There are over 500 students on roll including approximately 70 students in the sixth form. The school is linked as a cooperative trust with The Highfield School as The Letchworth Garden City Education Partnership.

It is situated in the west of Letchworth, just north of the railway line to Baldock and Cambridge. It is on Icknield Way.

== History ==
The school's origins lie in Letchworth Grammar School, which moved to the site in 1976 after the former site closed in July of that year. The building of the former grammar school is on Broadway in Letchworth GC town centre.

== Academic standards ==
After several years in special measures and 'Requires Improvement, in June 2015 the school was judged by Ofsted to be "Good" and affirmed the school’s belief that it can become ‘Outstanding’ by adding that the leadership ‘demonstrate the necessary ambition and vision to secure further improvement for the school’. Ofsted confirmed that ‘teachers are committed to the success of their students’, ‘students behave well around the school’, ‘bullying is rare’ and ‘achievement shows substantial improvement’. In 2019, Ofsted again judged Fearnhill to be in "Requires Improvement". In the GCSE results announced in August 2015, 47% of the students achieved A*-C grades including maths and English GCSEs. The A Level results in August 2022 were the best the school has ever achieved. In 2022, the school returned to a "Good" Ofsted Report.

== Sixth form ==
The sixth form at Fearnhill is thriving and successful and it was noted by Ofsted that ‘sixth form provision is a strength of the school’. Each year the school admits a cohort of students into Year 12, including external pupils from any school according to their GCSE results. The sixth form teaches AS and A2 courses as well as BTEC courses.

== House system ==
The school has a house system with four houses named after key figures in the development of Letchworth Garden City: Gorst, Howard, Pearsall and Neville. Each house is led by a senior member of staff and a sixth form House Captain. The houses compete against each other to win events such as sports day as well as Christmas and summer house competitions. Students are also awarded house points for good effort, community service and effective learning. The total number of points for each house is used to determine which house is the winner of the annual house competition.

== Fearnfile ==
Fearnfile is the Fearnhill fortnightly magazine of news, articles, and original contributions. Fearnfile is becoming a publication that is written by pupils, for pupils. Previous issues include information about any member of staff who has left or who joined the school that academic year, updates of music and drama events, sports teams and reports from trips.

== Sport ==
Fearnhill School competes in a range of academic year. Across all year groups students have the opportunity to compete in sports such as football, netball, rugby, hockey, basketball, rounders, cricket and athletics. Aside from these activities Fearnhill also compete in volleyball, table tennis, badminton, indoor athletics and cross-country. Currently competing against schools from all over Hertfordshire in the county athletics league Fearnhillp.

== Notable former pupils ==
- Mandeep Dhillon, TV and film actress
- Ruth Goodman, social historian and TV personality
- Nicky Hunt, double Commonwealth gold medallist for archery 2010
- Dave Kitson, Premier League footballer for Reading and Stoke City
- Victoria Pendleton, Olympic and world champion track cyclist
- Claire Rushbrook, TV actress
- Simon West, film director
- Bryn Davies, British trade unionist, actuary and politician

=== Letchworth Grammar School ===
- William Bonfield CBE, Professor of Medical Materials from 2000-5 at the University of Cambridge, who founded the Journal of Materials Science: Materials in Medicine
- Meir M. Lehman, known for Lehman's laws of software evolution, and Professor of Computing Science from 1972-84 at Imperial College London
