= Barony of Kersland =

Scottish demesne

Kersland Manor House
- Dalry, North Ayrshire, Scotland; UK grid reference NS30655083
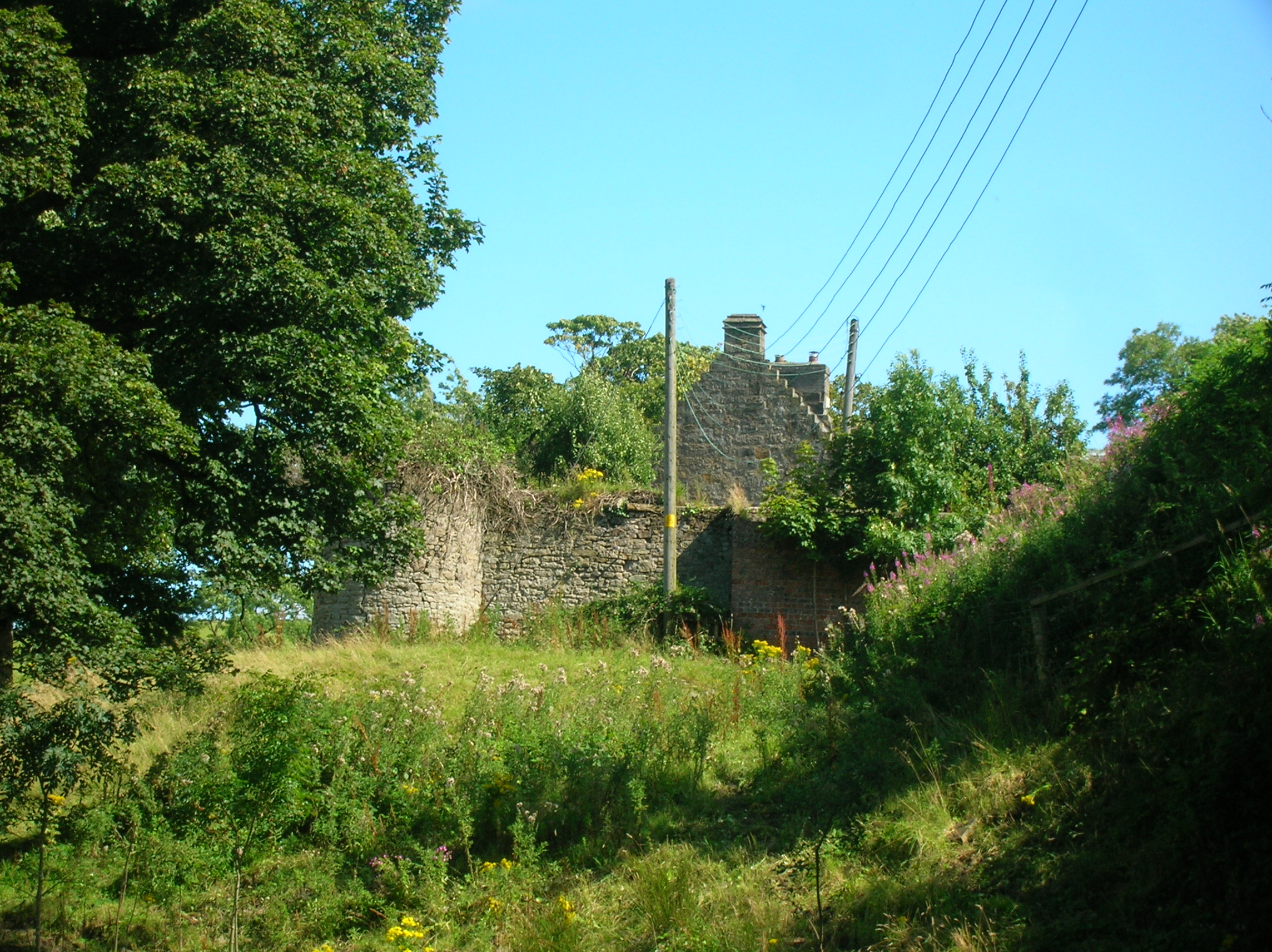
- Kersland Castle and barmkin.

Site information
- Type: Tower
- Owner: Private
- Controlled by: Clan Kerr
- Open to the public: No
- Condition: Ruined

Location
- Shown within Scotland
- Coordinates: 55.720987°N 4.696817°W

Site history
- Built: 15th century
- In use: Until 18th century
- Materials: Stone

The remains of the old castle of Kersland lie about 1.5 miles to the north-east of the town of Dalry in North Ayrshire, Scotland, in the old Barony of Kersland. The River Garnock lies nearby.

== The history of Kersland ==
=== The Barony ===
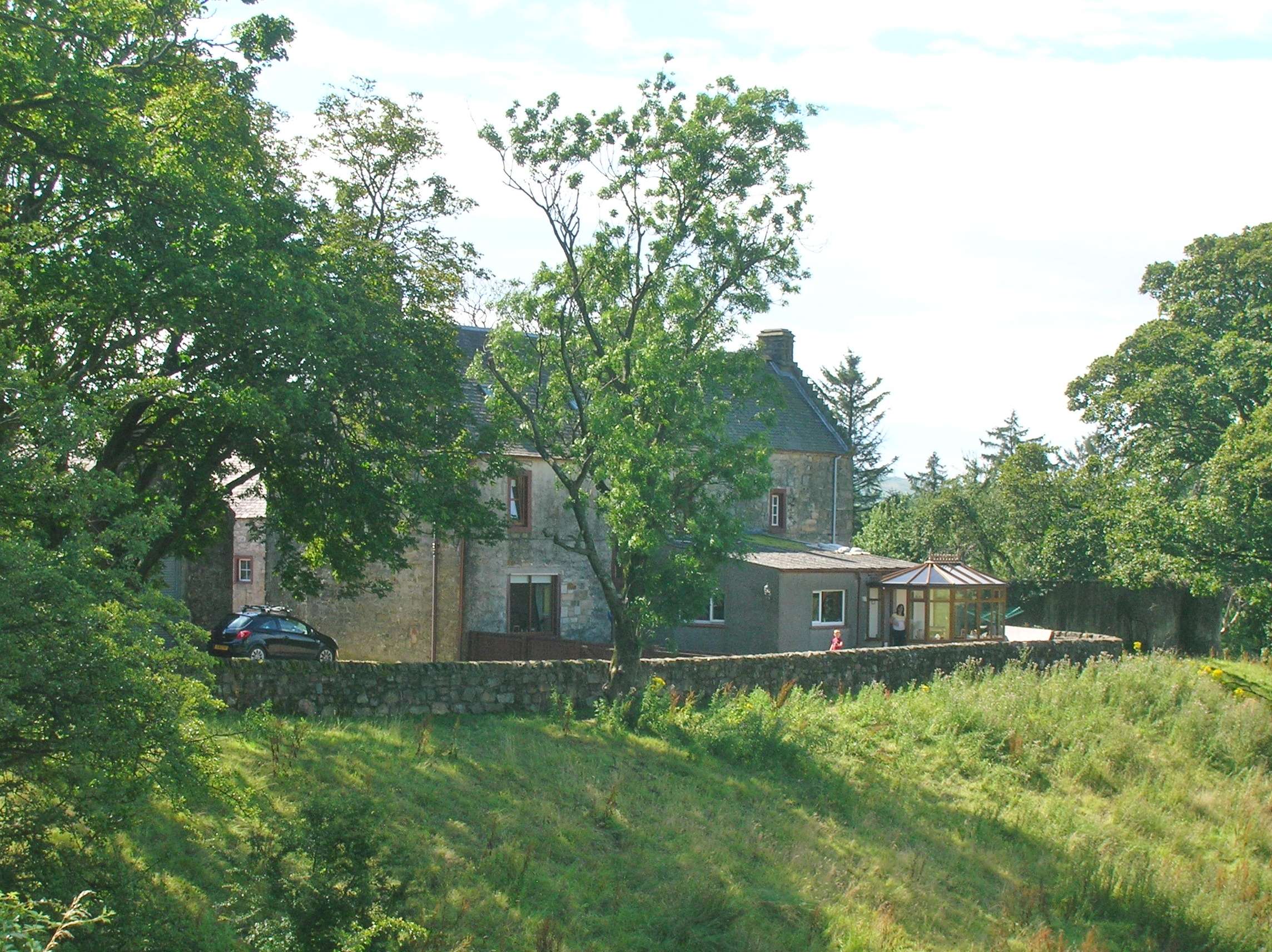
Kersland House.

The Barony of Kersland was once extensive, however after the days of the Kerrs the land was parcelled out and the mid-superiority purchased by John Smith of Swineridgemuir (sic) after having been held by the Kerr family for upwards of 500 years. In the 15th century the parish had four other baronies: Kelburne, Blair, Lynn and Pitcon. The Kerslands proper sat on a bank shelving towards the River Garnock, comprising the properties of Kersehead, the Coalheugh-glen, the Tod-hills, the Brown-hills, the Davids-hills, and Auchengree, amounting to about 700 acres of arable land.

=== The Manor house ===
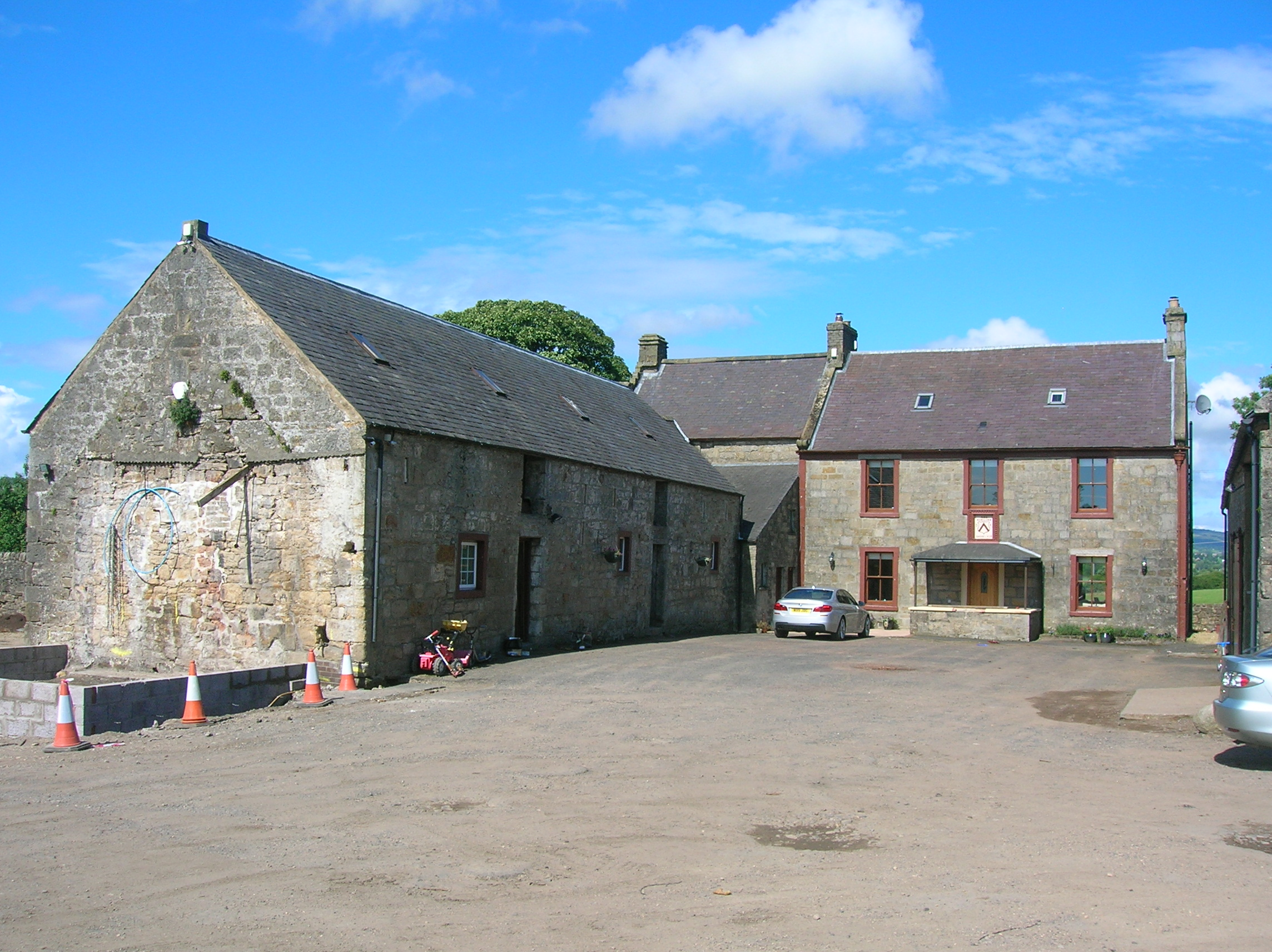
The old East Kersland Farm

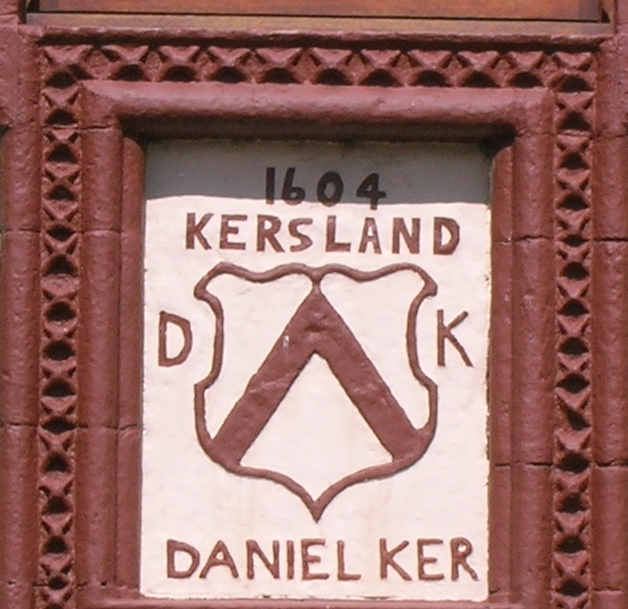
The carved stone

The ancient mansion or castle of Kersland stood on Easter (now 'East') Kersland Farm. The remains of the 'L-Plan' tower has been built into the farmhouse. The barmkin wall survives and has a surviving strong defensive corner tower. Paterson records that the house was almost entirely pulled down by the feuar, Robert Ker. The remaining two barrel vaulted chambers, later used as a dairy and stable, with walls 8 ft thick, until recently formed part of the offices attached to East Kersland.

Over the main entrance door of the dwelling house is a carved stone removed from the old manor house bearing the arms of the Ker family, with an inscription "Daniel Ker Kersland - 1604". This date stone has been touched-up with paint. Karrisland (sic) is recorded on Timothy Pont's map c. 1604, as are the placenames Karshead, Todsle, Dysil, and Achingry. In 1685 'Carsland' is shown. The property had been surrounded by trees and had an orchard of considerable extent. Kersland Mains was on the entrance lane from Dalry and became Wester Kersland Farm when the manor house/castle was demolished.

==== The Barony mills ====
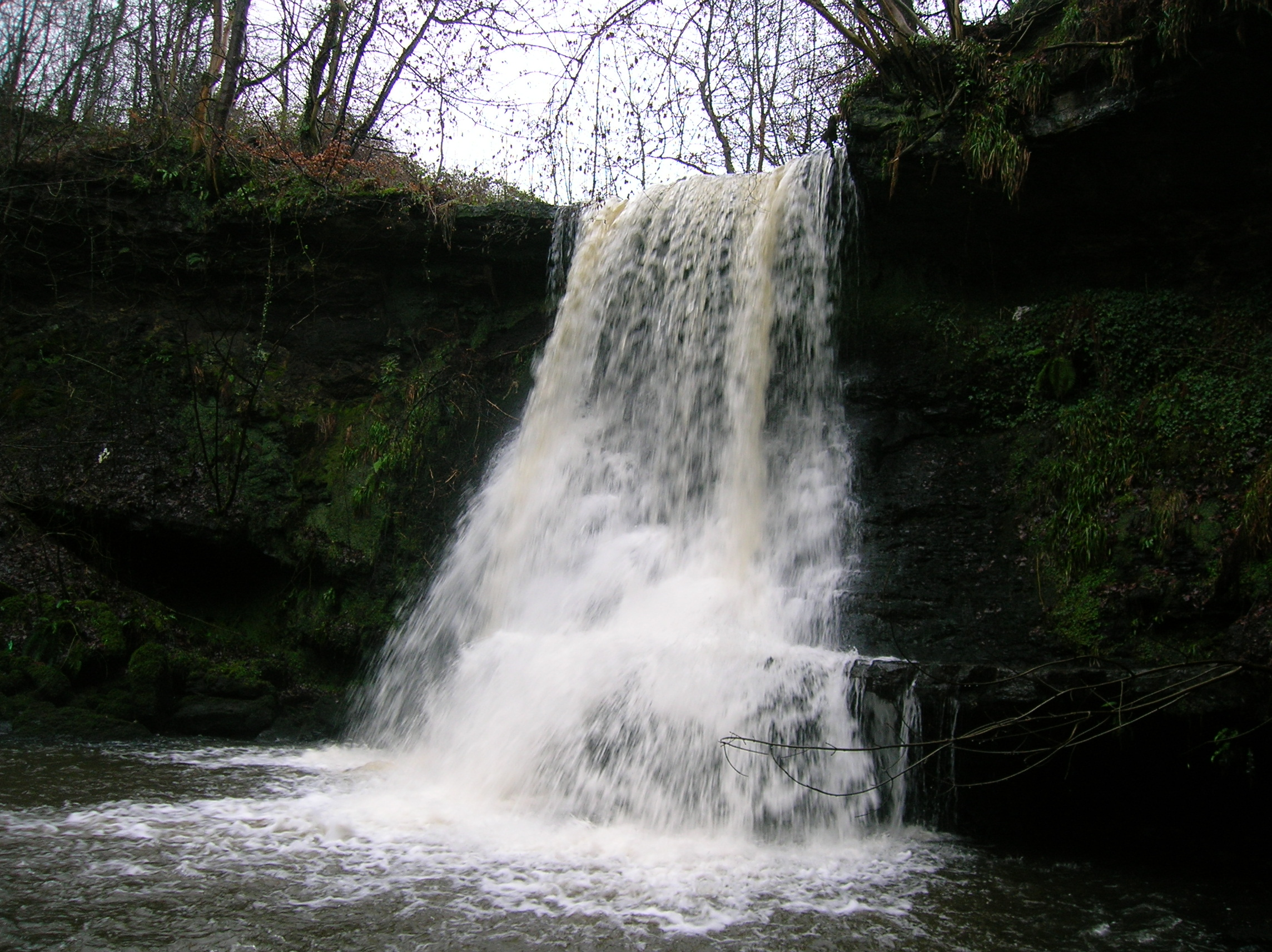
The Linn Spout or Tianna Falls near Longbar.

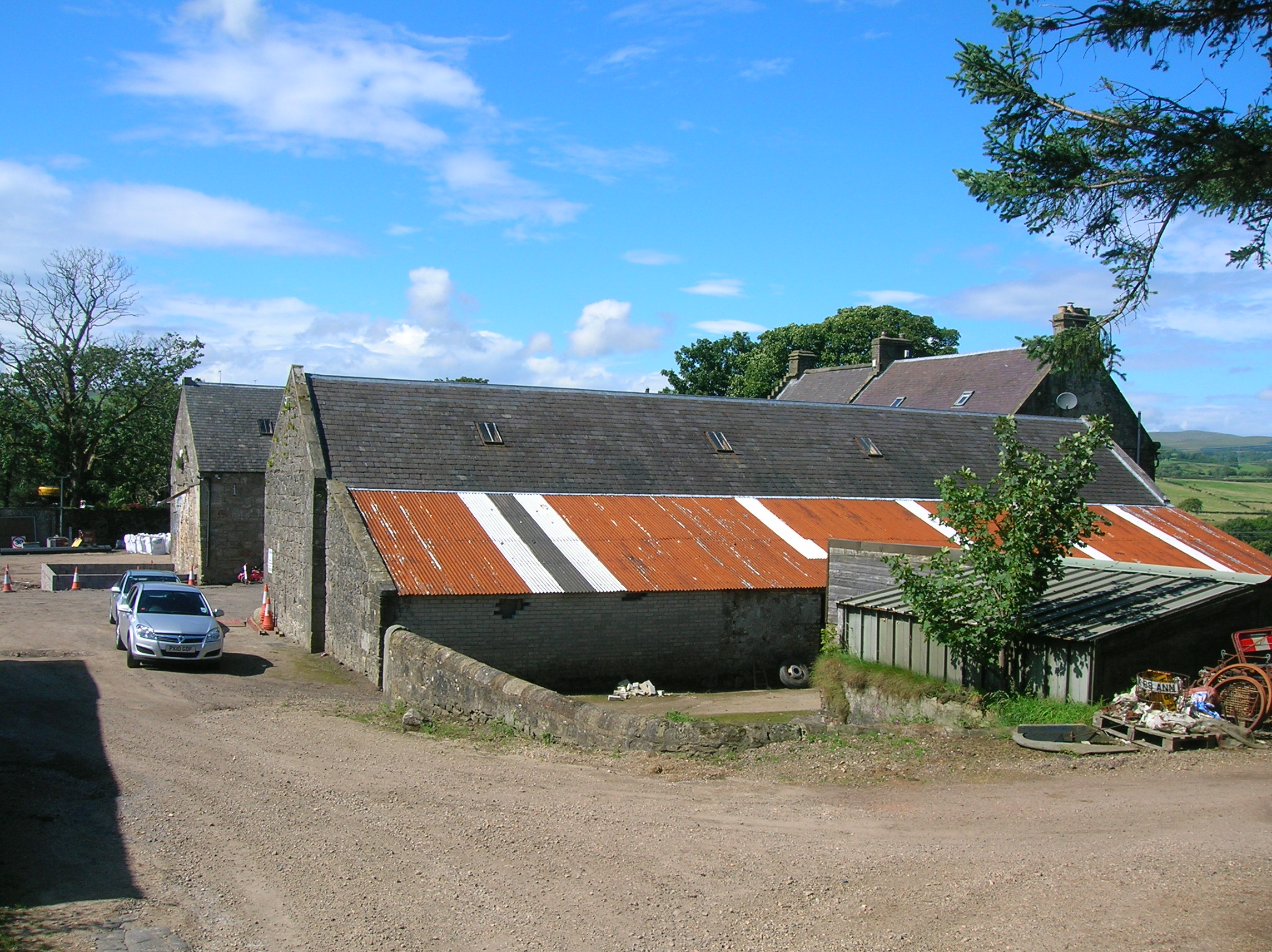
East Kersland Farm and site of the old sawmill.

Most baronies had a water mill which was under the control of the laird or lord and to which the tenants were thirled or obliged to go to have their grain ground into flour. A proportion of the grain was taken as payment. Thirlage ended in the late 18th century and resulted in a number of mills being abandoned once market forces took a hold. Kersland Mill on the Powgree Burn lies just downstream of the Tianna Falls in the Kersland Glen and is recorded on Timothy Pont's map c. 1604. Robert Spier, writer and bank agent in Beith was descended from the Spier's of Kersland Mill which he purchased from his elder brother. In 1852 Captain John Russell of Maulside acquired Kersland Mill and the mill lands.

A sawmill also existed at East Kersland with associated mill pond and settlement ponds and sluices. Originally the mill was fed by water from the old Kersloch near Kerselochmuir, carried to the site in an underground culvert and later by the muir alone. The mill had several dams and three mill ponds which have now been infilled.

== The barony and associated families ==
=== The Kers of Kersland ===
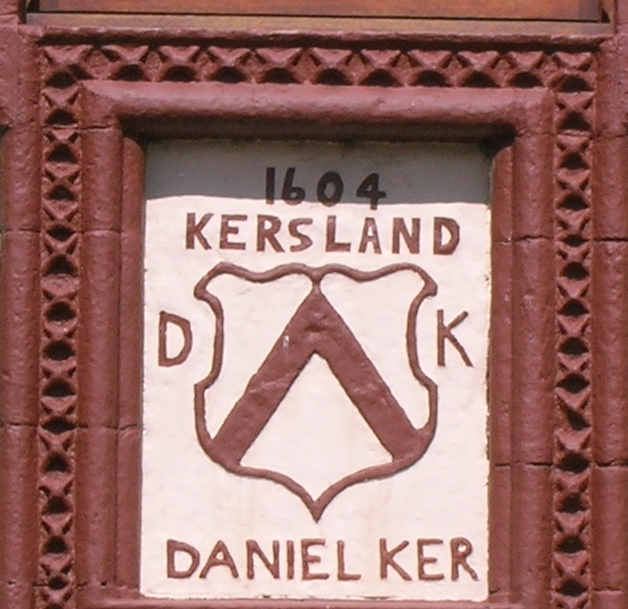
Datestone and coat of arms from the old castle.

The place name 'Kerse' used for the farms and the bridge at the northern end of the loch refers in Scots to 'Low and fertile land adjacent to a river or loch'. The old Barony of Kersland was held by the Ker (latterly Kerr) family and the name of the barony derives from them. The Kers of Kersland appear to be the oldest representatives of the family in Scotland.

The arms of the Kers of Kersland were a chevron, charged with three stars or mollets. The motto was "Praise God". The coat of arms were displayed at Dalry church.

A local tradition suggests that two sons of Kersland were found guilty of, or at least being involved in the slaughter of a Laird of the Blair; they at first took refuge in England, but afterwards settled on the Border. One of these sons is said to have been Ralph Ker, who was founder of the Kers of Ferniehirst; while the other is stated to have been the founder of Kers of Cessford.

A William de Ker is recorded in 1205 as holding land in the Dalry area and his son William (d. 1305) inherited in 1292, one of the Scottish barons who submitted to the rule of Edward I. Finlaio de Kerr, succeeded in 1362, followed by Willielmi Ker in 1421. Robert Ker, was slain at Flodden in 1513, leaving two sons, John and Robert. John Ker succeeded his father at Kersland. Robert Ker, the second son, took over Auchengree and his descendants became known as the Kers of Auchengree. John Ker of Kersland succeeded his father. John Ker married Lady Agnes Montgomerie in 1530, the daughter of Hugh Montgomerie, the first Earl of Eglinton, and Helen Campbell of Argyle. Both John and Agnes were born after 1478. Agnes died on 26 October 1596.

Robert Ker of Kersland, succeeded his father and married Agnes Montgomerie, daughter of Hugh of Hessilhead in 1556. The couple had no sons, but three daughters, Janet, Margaret and Jean. Margaret married Patrick Maxwell of Dargavel and Jean married Gavin Ralston of Ralston. Janet Ker married the famous Captain Thomas Crawford of Jordanhill who captured Dumbarton Castle from Mary Queen of Scots supporters during the minority of James VI. The couple had two sons, Daniel (b. c 1539) and Hugh, the latter inheriting the lands of Jordanhill. Crawford died on 3 January 1603 and is entombed at Kilbirnie Auld Kirk with Janet.

==== The Crawfurd Kers (Jordanhill) ====
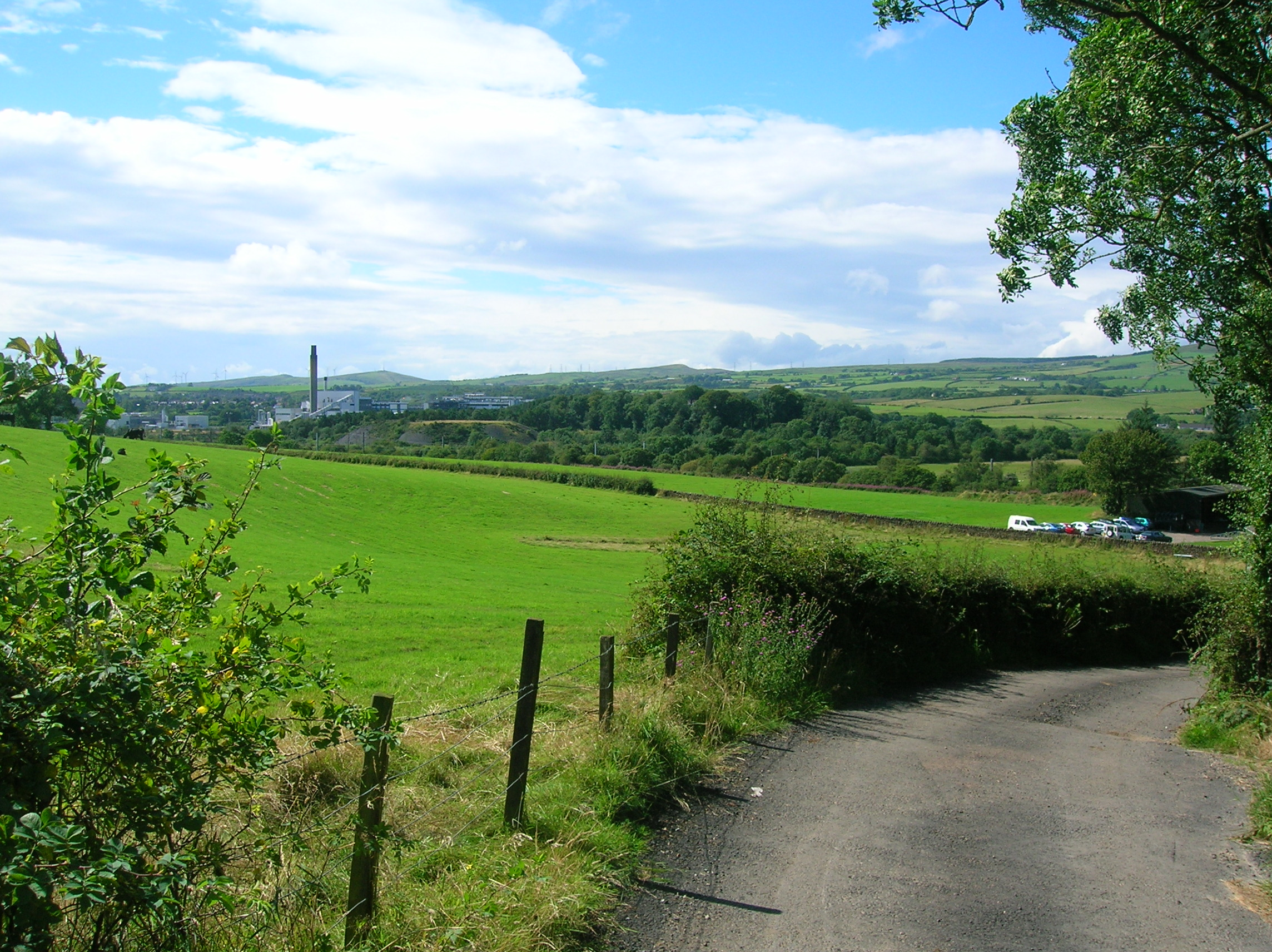
A view from the old millponds site of Pitcon Woods and Dalry.

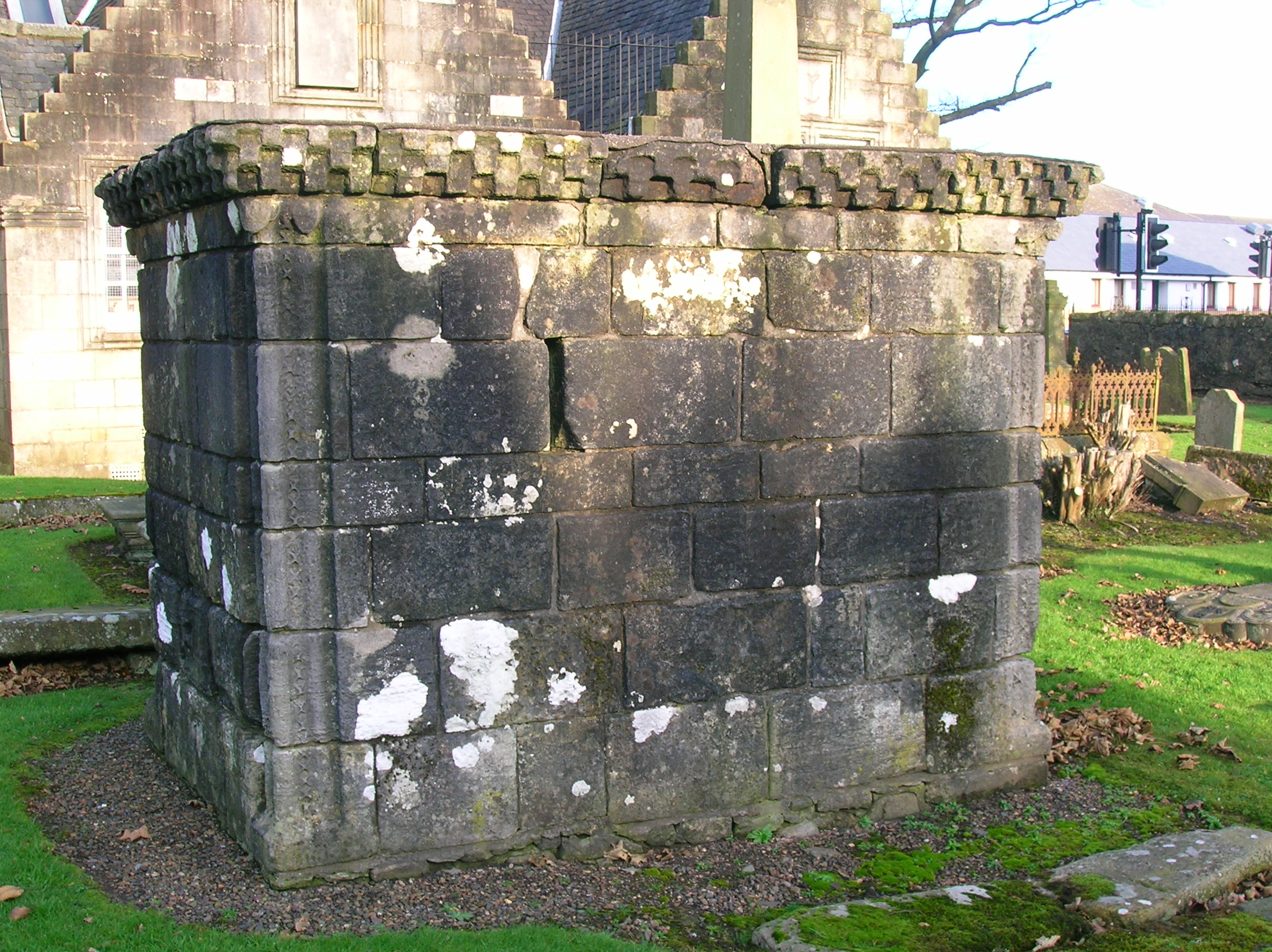
The tomb of Thomas and Janet Craufurd at Kilbirnie.

Daniel Crawfurd adopted the name and arms of Ker of Kersland and married first Annabella Campbell, daughter of Sir Matthew Campbell of Loudoun, Sheriff of Ayr, and second Isobel Drummond, in about 1578 at Loudoun, Ayrshire. Annabella was born about 1543 at Loudoun Castle, Ayrshire. They had seven children: Hugh (Hew), John, Isobel, Margaret, Janet, Anna, and Susanna. Isobel married Robert Kerr of Trearne. Daniel appointed Robert Ker as Executor for his son Hugh. Anna married George Campbell of Cessnock. Susanna married Colonel Campbell of Ellengreig. John Ker became Laird of Brackenhill or Bankhill. Daniel Ker died in 1613.

Hugh Crawfurd Ker was born about 1560, and succeeded his father in 1613 and married Jean Blair, daughter of Blair of that Ilk in 1640, having three children, Robert, Margaret and Annabella. Margaret married William Scott of Cambeith. Annabella married William Dunlop of Bloak. Robert Ker married Barbara Montgomerie, daughter of Robert Montgomerie of Hessilhead. They had six children: Robert, Daniel, Jean, Margaret, Anna and Elizabeth. Robert, the eldest son, had no issue. Daniel succeeded his father. Margaret married Rev. Thomas Linning of Lesmahagow. Jean married Major William Borthwick. Elizabeth married Alexander Porterfield, a surgeon in Glasgow. Anna married John Crawfurd of Fergushill.

Robert Kerr the Covenanter

Robert Ker lost his estates as a leading covenanter and died in Holland in 1680. His family were very religious and in 1666 he joined the Laird of Caldwell and a number of others with the intention of joining Colonel Wallace and others who had renewed the Covenant at Lanark. General Dalziel's troops disposition forced them to abandon their plans and after being betrayed by Laird of Caldwell he was forced to flee to Holland where he lived with his family in Utrecht for three years. His confiscated estate was given to General Drummond of Cromlie and his Beith lands were given to William Blair of that Ilk; they held these lands until the Reformation. Business required him to return to Scotland which he did shortly after his wife who had returned to lodgings in Edinburgh at the end of 1669. He lodged elsewhere however his wife took ill and he was betrayed and taken prisoner when visiting her. For three months he was kept in Edinburgh and then taken to Dumbarton Castle where he was imprisoned for 18 months until moving for three winter months to Aberdeen to be kept in solitary confinement and denied a fire. Stirling Castle was his next destination and he remained there for several years until a return to Dumbarton Castle that lasted until October 1677.

Irvine was to be his next place of confinement although he was to be permitted to have his family join him. Robert visited Glasgow to collect his wife and their five children and was to be detained in the tolbooth overnight, however a fire broke out and after a refusal of the magistrates to open the doors the citizens of the city released them using ladders. Fearing further confinement he took refuge with a group of persecuted ministers and attended a conventicle at Maybole before returning to Utrecht in 1678 where he remained until his death in 1680.

==== Drummond ====
Robert Ker was indicted with treason during the Covenanting 'Killing Times' and his lands were given to Lieutenant-General William Drummond of Cromlix in the 1680s. The forfeiture was rescinded and the estates were restored. Another source gives Daniel Ker as the member of the family who held the estate at the time.

==== The Borthwick Kers ====
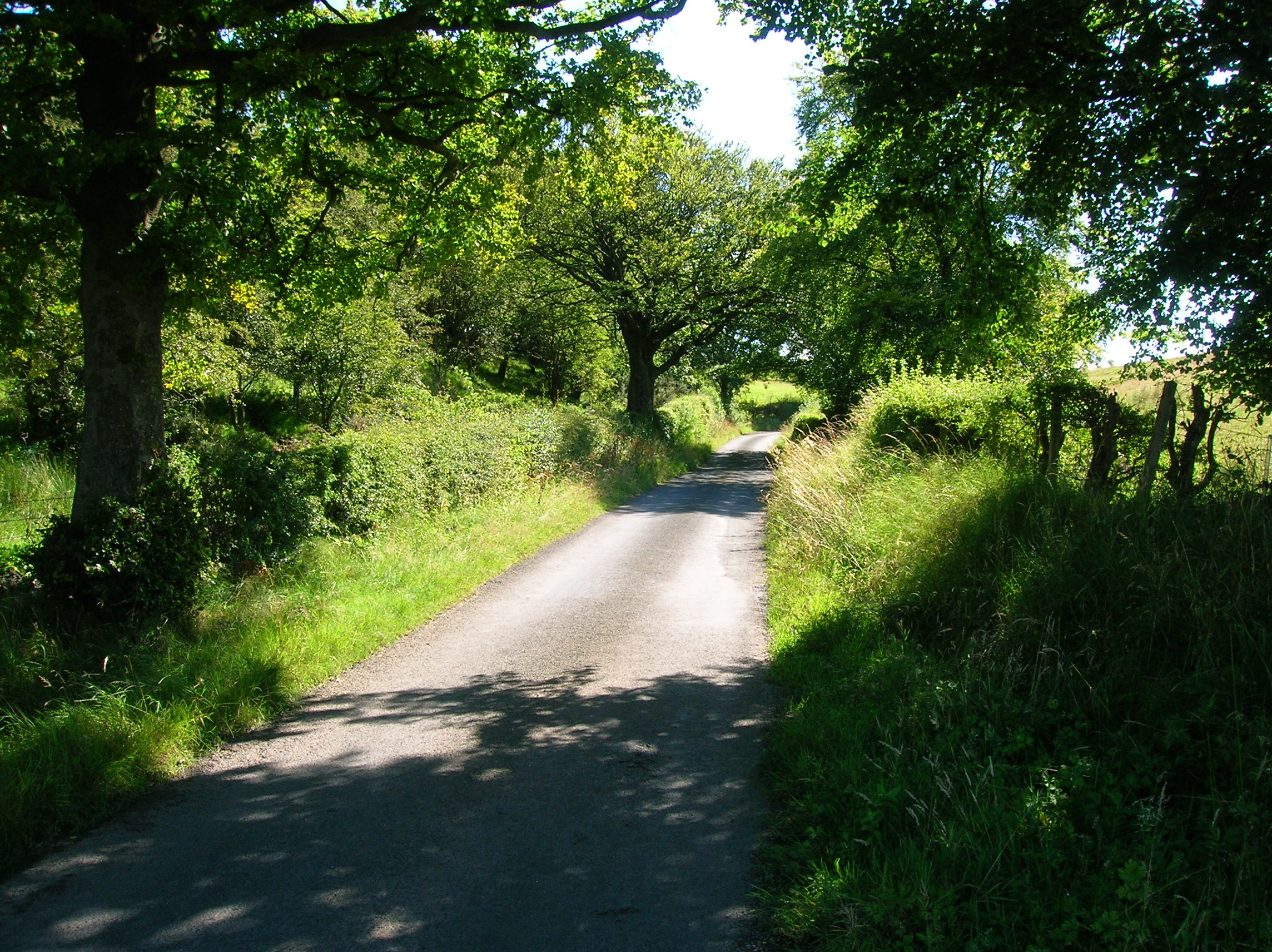
The old lane leading to the Kerslands.

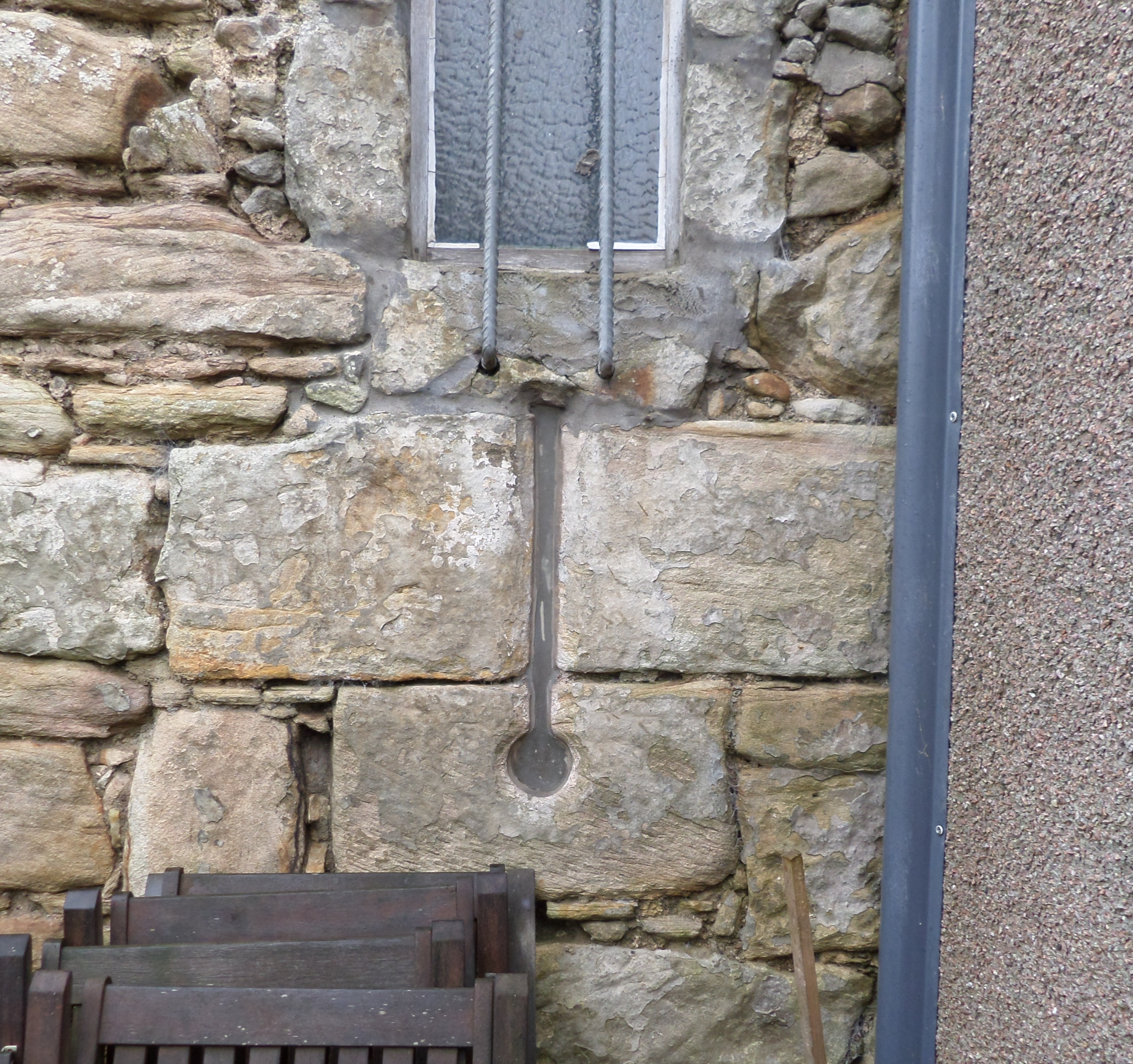
Arrow and gun slit - an embrasure.

Daniel Crawfurd also took the name and arms of the Ker family and inherited the lands of Kersland within this extensive Barony of Kersland. He was a made a major in the Earl of Angus' (Cameronian) regiment, and was killed at the Battle of Steinkirk in 1692. He was unmarried and his sister, Jean Ker, married Major William Borthwick of Johnstonburn, and inherited Kersland. In 1697, they sold the estate to her sister Anna, wife of John Crawfurd of Fergushill. John Crawfurd was born August 8, 1673, at Crawfurdland and married Anna c. 1703 at Kersland. He assumed the name and title John Ker of Kersland, dying on 8 July 1726 in Debtor's Prison, London, having first written his "Memoirs and Negotiations" which were later published. He was buried in Southwark on the north side of Saint George's churchyard.

John Ker was survived by three daughters of whom, Anna and Jean died apparently unmarried. His daughter Elizabeth married John Campbell "of Ellengreig", also 'Ellan-Dheirrig' or 'Ellan-Gheirrig', a small island in Loch Riddan, in the parish of Inverchaolain, Argyllshire. Elizabeth and John Campbell had no children. Elizabeth was the last to take the title 'Lady Kersland' and died impoverished at the house of John Ker, a Beith merchant, where she had lived for many years, being buried in the Hessilhead tomb, Beith. Anna and Jean, sisters to Elizabeth, sold the barony and property to William Scot of Bavelaw in 1736. They had been forced to sell to pay off their father's many creditors.

=== The Scots ===
William Scot of Bavelaw purchased the barony and his son Lawrence divided the Mains of Kersland into two farms, Easter and Wester Kersland, feuing Easter to Robert Ker and Wester to James Kirkwood. Lawrence had a son Charles who borrowed so much money against the feu-duties that upon his death the barony in 1801 was sold. At this time John Smith of Swindridgemuir purchased the mid-superiority.

== Kersland Barony church and school ==
The Church of Scotland school at Barkip, also known as The Den, had an average attendance of 137 pupils in 1891; it was named for the old barony.

== Industrial history ==
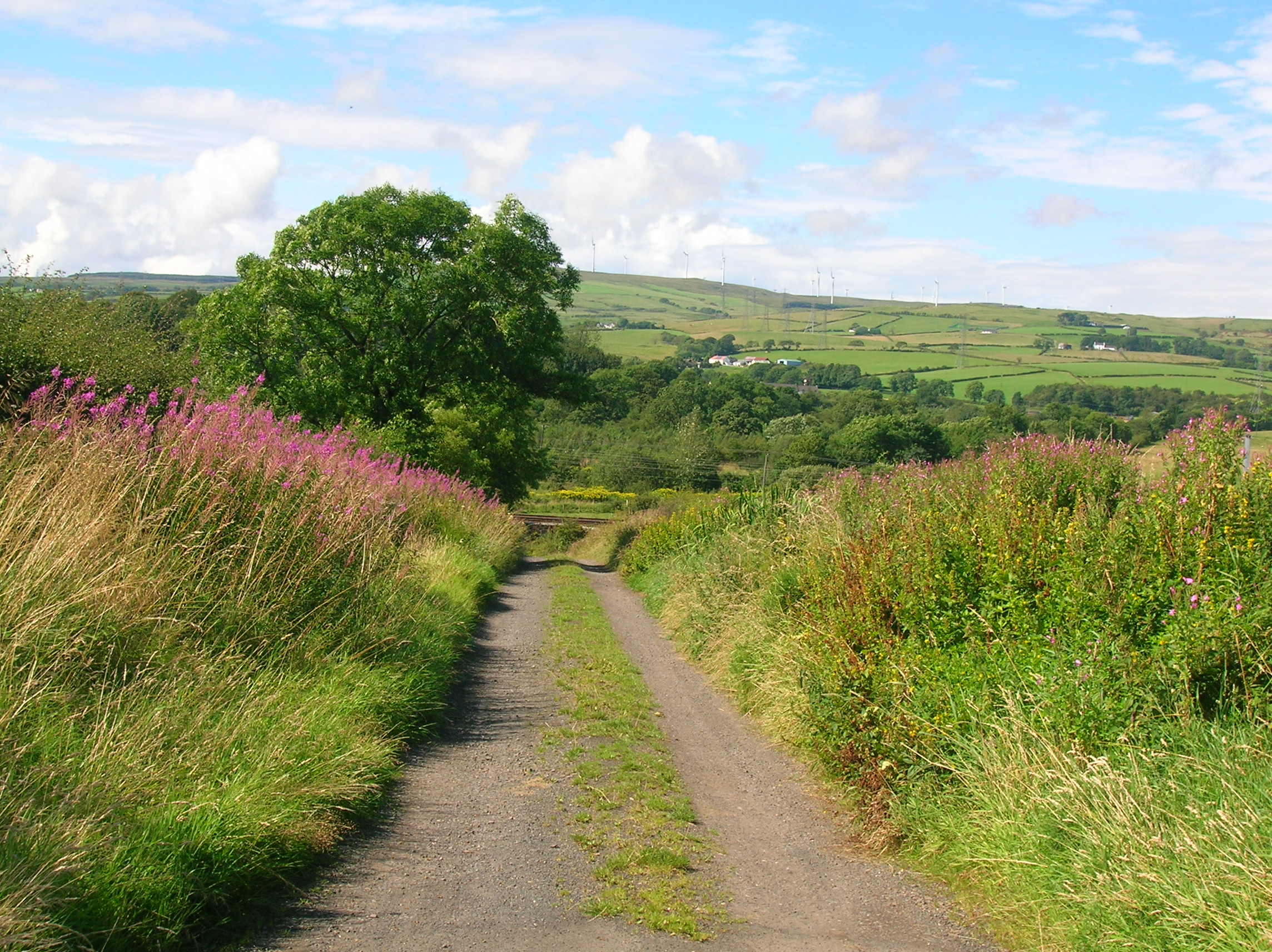
The site of Kersland Row at the site of the old ironstone pit and later the brickworks.

Several ironstone pits were located in the area, such as the Kersland Pit which was rail connected, together with sandstone quarries, brickworks and coal mines, including the Kersland Colliery above Highfield. A miner's row was located near the Kersland pit at West Kersland.

== Micro-history ==
An Irish connection exists as John Roche of Ballickmahon, in the parish of Crossmolina, barony of Tyrawley, married Janet, daughter of Robert Kerr of Kersland.

Margaret Blair married a Kerr of Kersland and obtained a charter of the lands of Trearne for herself and her son Robert in January 1594.

Smith records that the sword of Kerr of Kersland was preserved "in Dr. Grierson's museum at Thornhill", and was one of the longest and heaviest in the collection.

== See also ==
- The Lands of Roughwood
- Barkip
- Haining Place and the Barony of Haining-Ross
