= Highfields Private School =

Coordinates: 50°14′18.4″N 5°13′38.0″W

- Redruth, Cornwall; England

Information
- Type: Private
- Motto: In animo et veritate
- Religious affiliation: Inter- / denominational
- Established: c.1990
- Local authority: Cornwall
- Head teacher: Mary Haddy
- Gender: Coeducational
- Age: 4 to 16
- Houses: Davey, Murdoch, Trengrouse, Trevithick
- Colour
- Former pupils: Old Highfieldians

Highfields Private School was a fee paying coeducational independent day school in Redruth, England, catering for pupils aged 4 to 16 years.
