= Highfield, North Ayrshire =

Coordinates: 55.715847°N 4.693222°W

Highfield: The Highfield
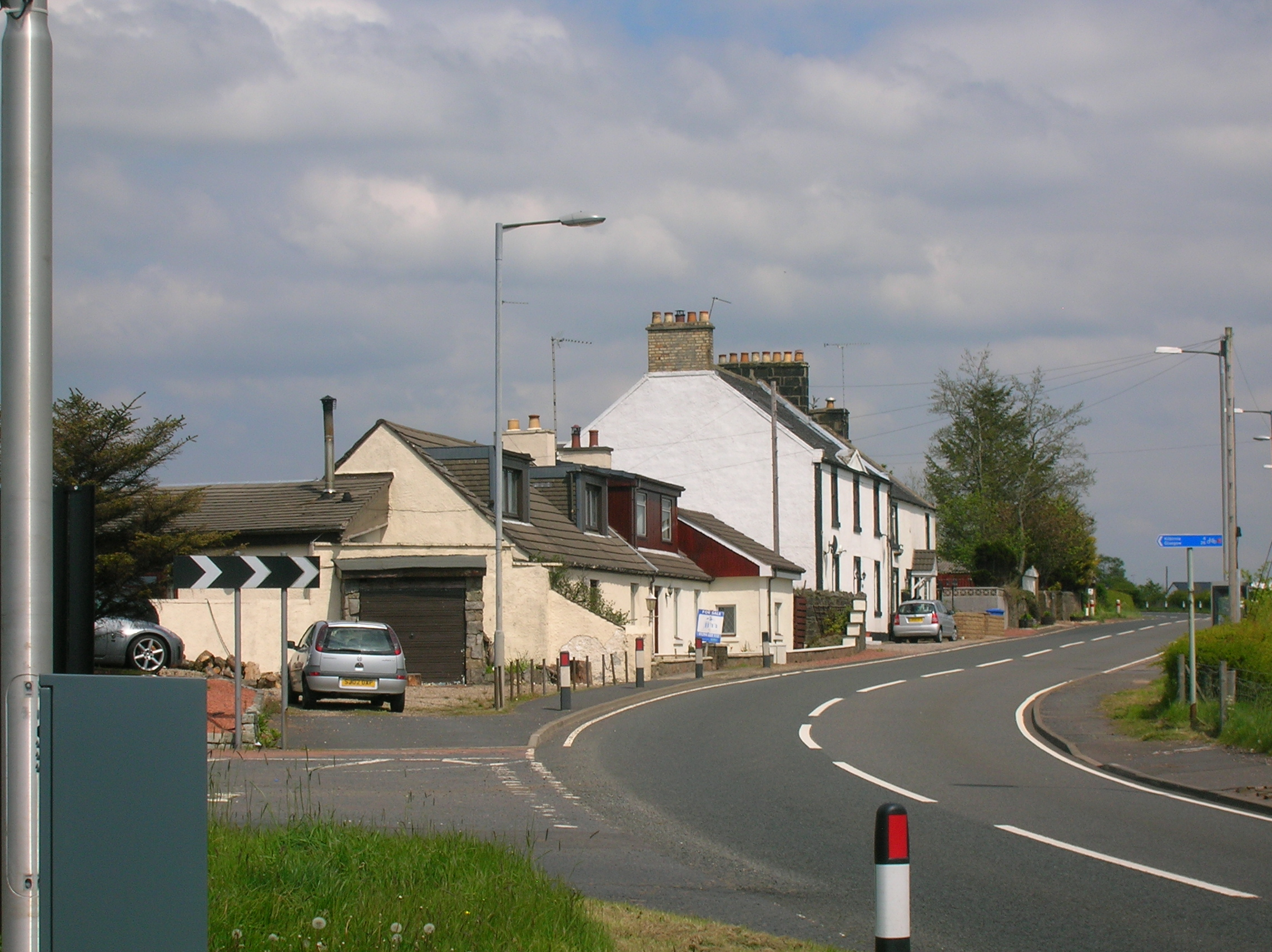
- Highfield

- Location within North Ayrshire
- OS grid reference: NS 30914 50223
- Council area: North Ayrshire
- Lieutenancy area: Ayrshire and Arran
- Country: Scotland
- Sovereign state: United Kingdom
- Police: Scotland
- Fire: Scottish
- Ambulance: Scottish
- UK Parliament: Central Ayrshire
- Scottish Parliament: Cunninghame South

Highfield is a small village or hamlet in North Ayrshire, Parish of Dalry, Scotland. It is situated between the settlements of Barkip and Dalry on the A737 at a junction with the B777. It lies in the lands of the old Barony of Kersland, the ruins of Kersland Castle and East Kersland Mill being situated nearby at East Kersland.

== History ==
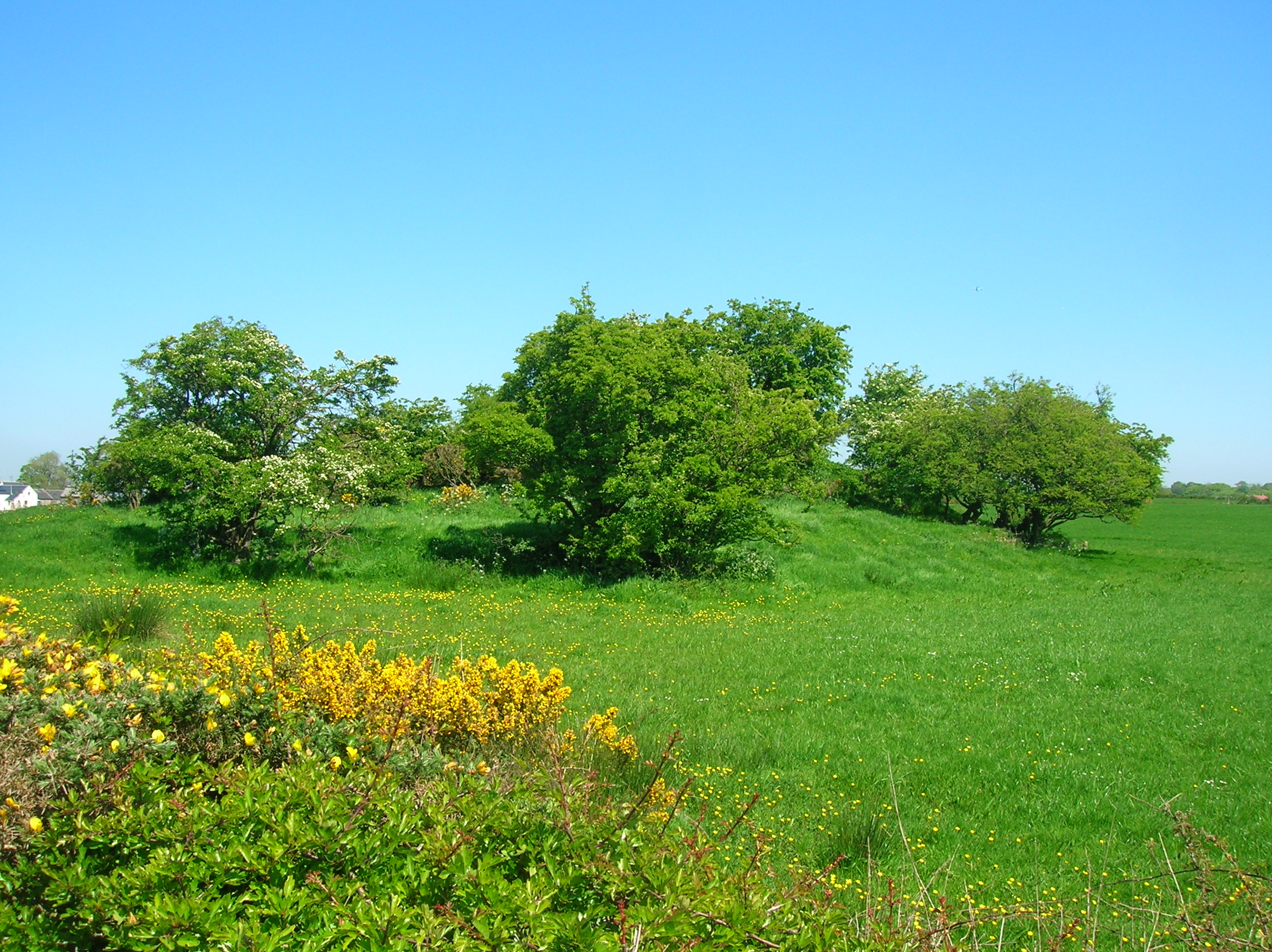
Site of the old Kersland Colliery.

A William Stewart of Hiefield is recorded in 1649.

Highfield is a hamlet of around twenty-five households at a crossroads on the old Beith to Dalry A737 turnpike, about half a mile from Dalry. A pub was once located here known as the Highfield Inn with a shop attached. A part of the settlement on the B777 road to Kilwinning is known as the 'Creepies' or 'Little Acre.' Creepie is a Scots work for the hedge sparrow. The village had some miner's cottages at the 'Creepies', long since demolished.

Southfield, once the name of the whole settlement of 374 inhabitants in the 19th century, is now the area of the settlement to the north of the A737, with a lodging house a surviving building that was a wash-house for the residents. A lane, later reduced to a footpath, ran from the crossroads to the old Kersland pit. Pasturehill Farm no longer exists, however Pasturehill Cottages are present on the A737.

=== Cartographic evidence ===
In 1747 the settlement of Hie Field (sic) is marked on Roy's map. In 1775 a substantial property, Highfield, is shown on Armstrong's map. Thomson's map of 1832 shows Highfield and the dwelling of Pasturehill Farm is shown off the old road; the new turnpike is now present. The 1890 OS map refers to the settlement 'Southfield'.

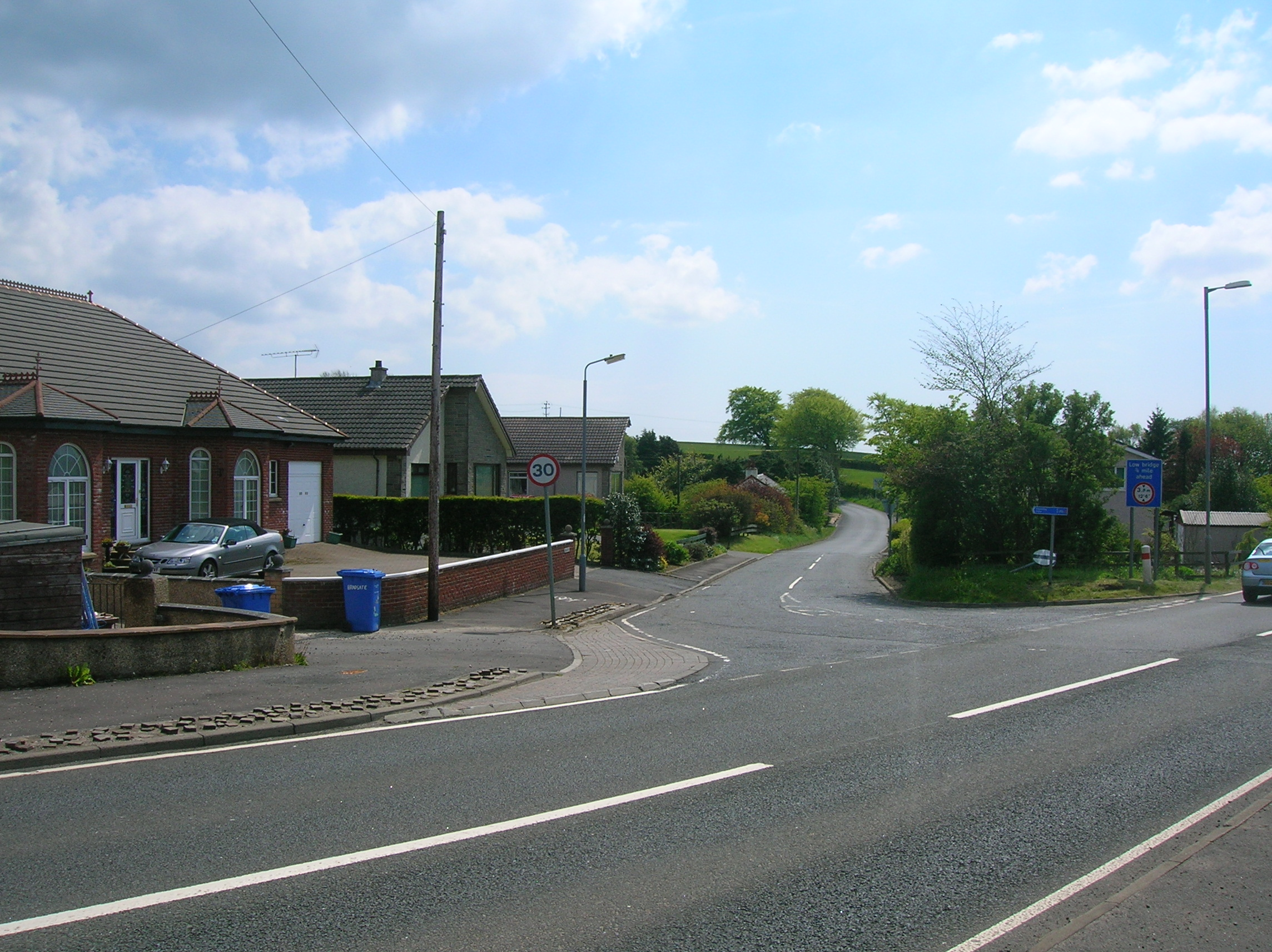
The Creepies and the B777 running south

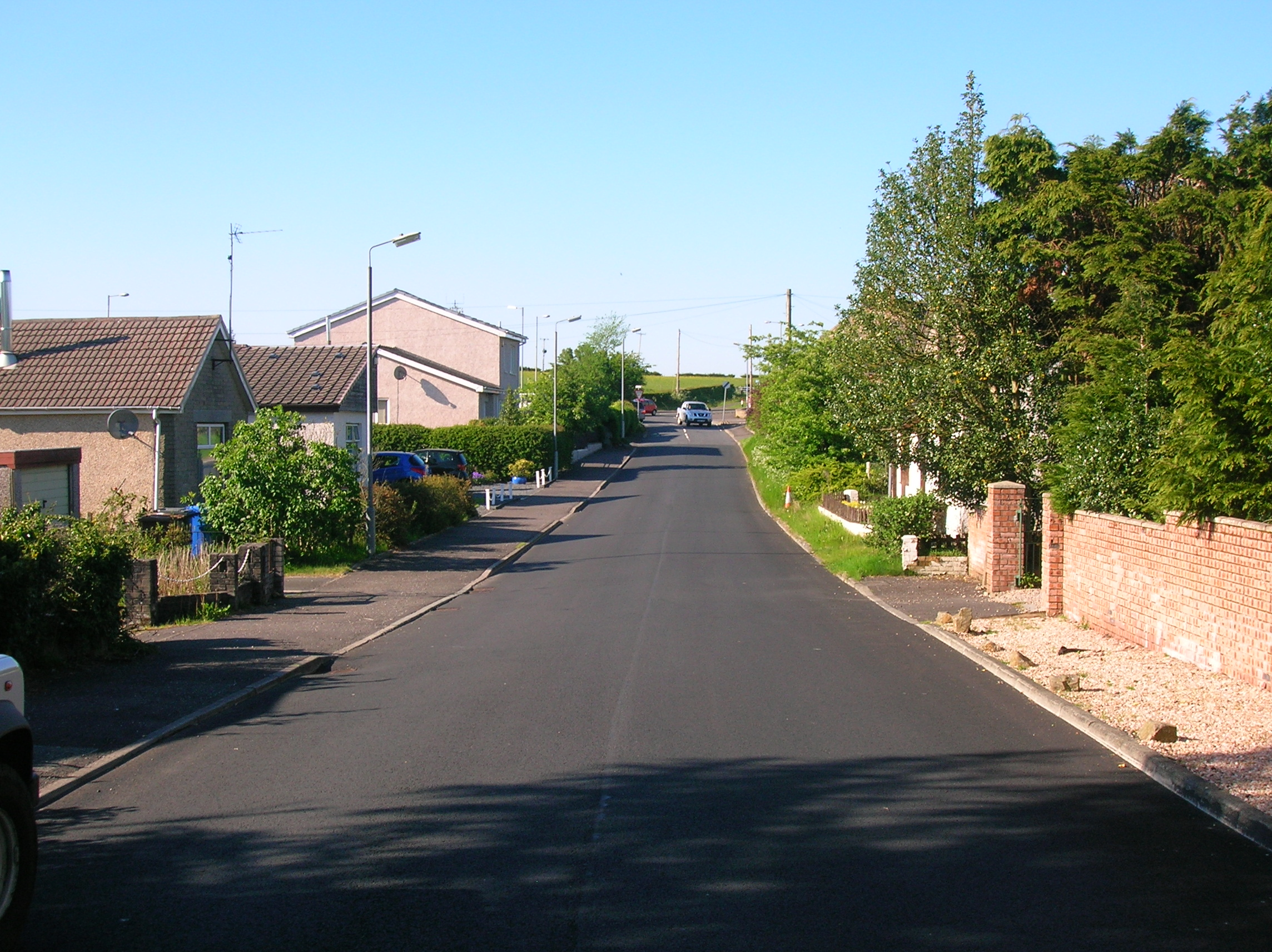
The Creepies as seen from the east

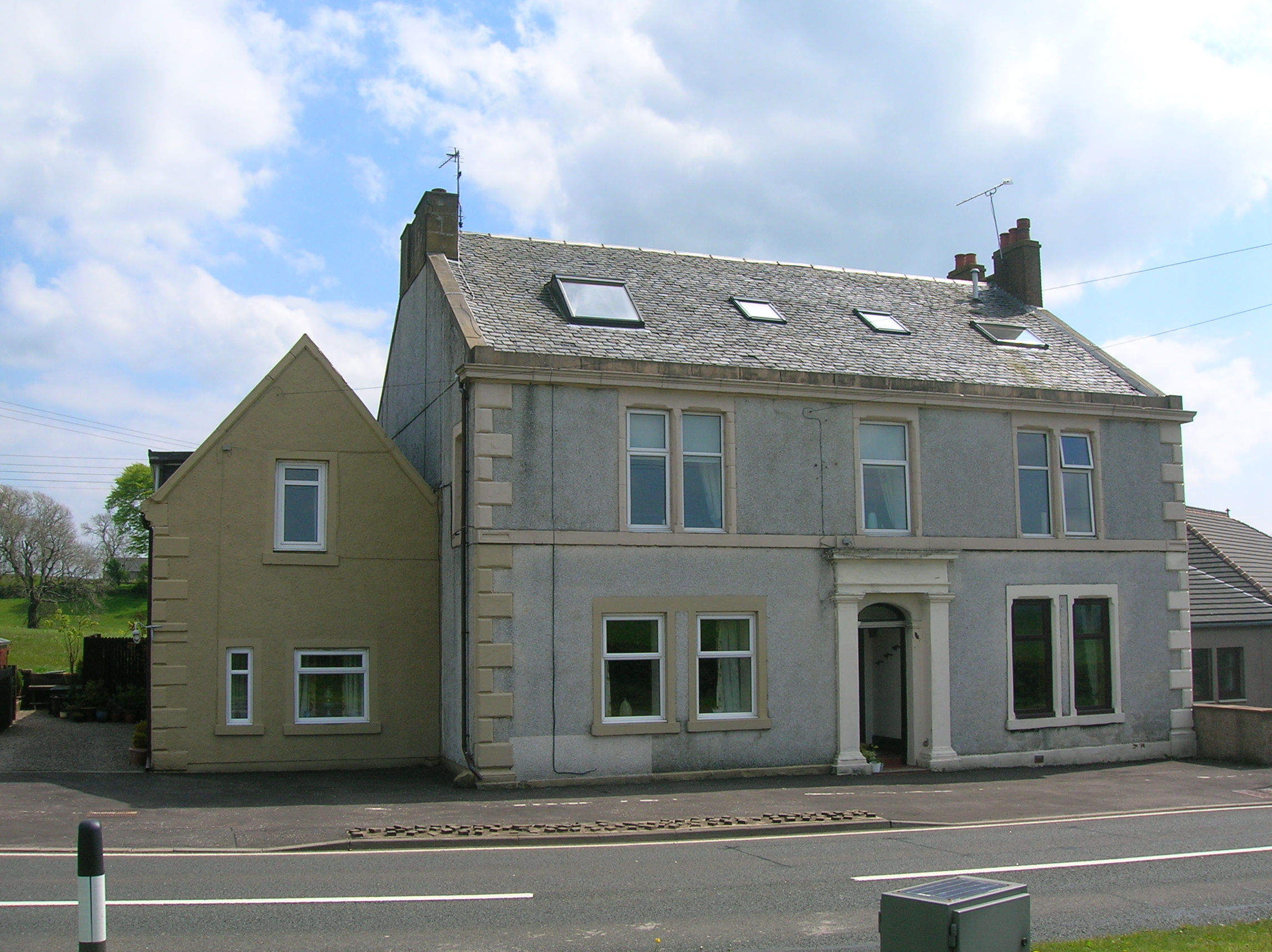
The old Highfield Cottage Inn

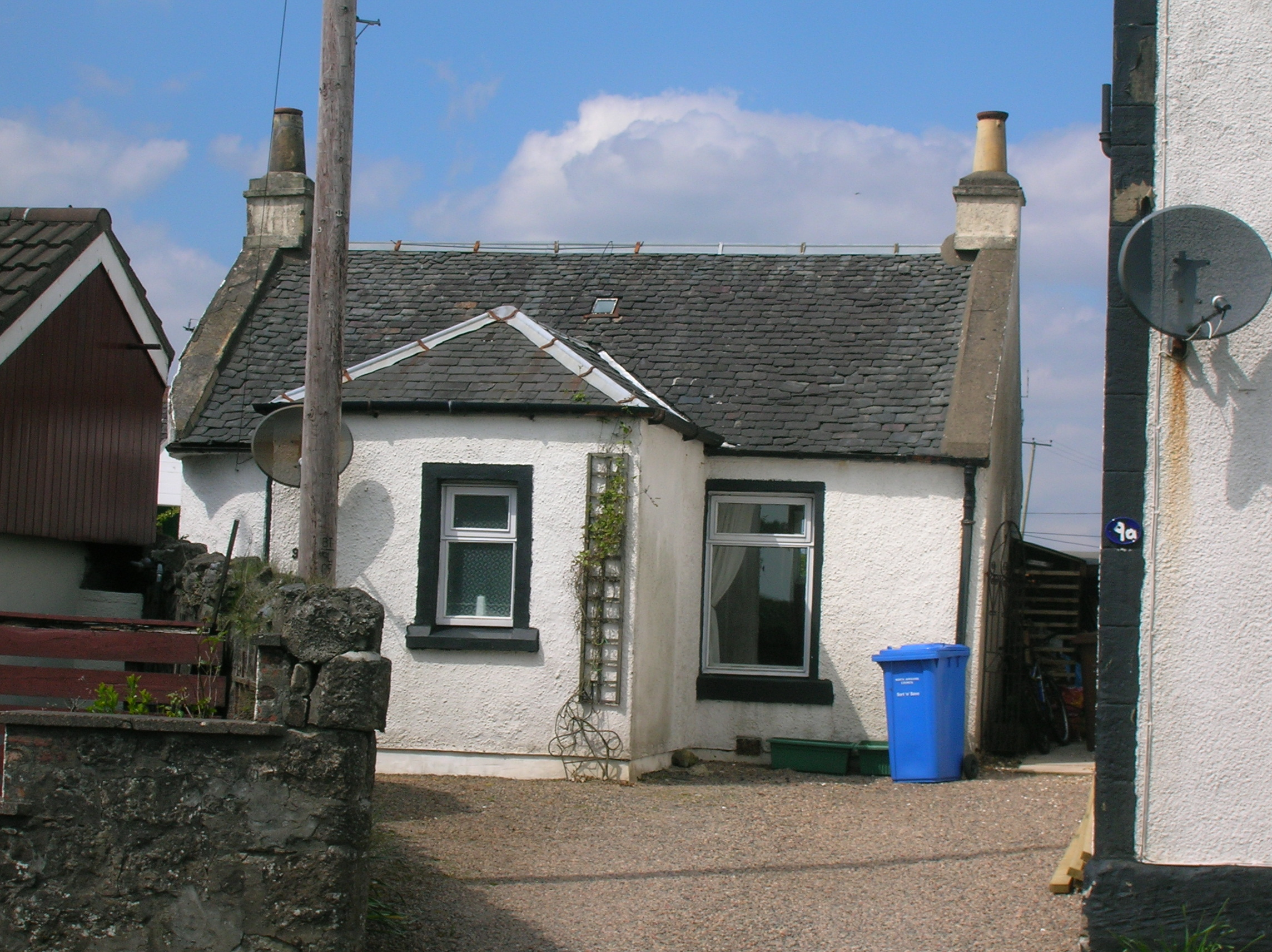
The old wash-house near Southfield

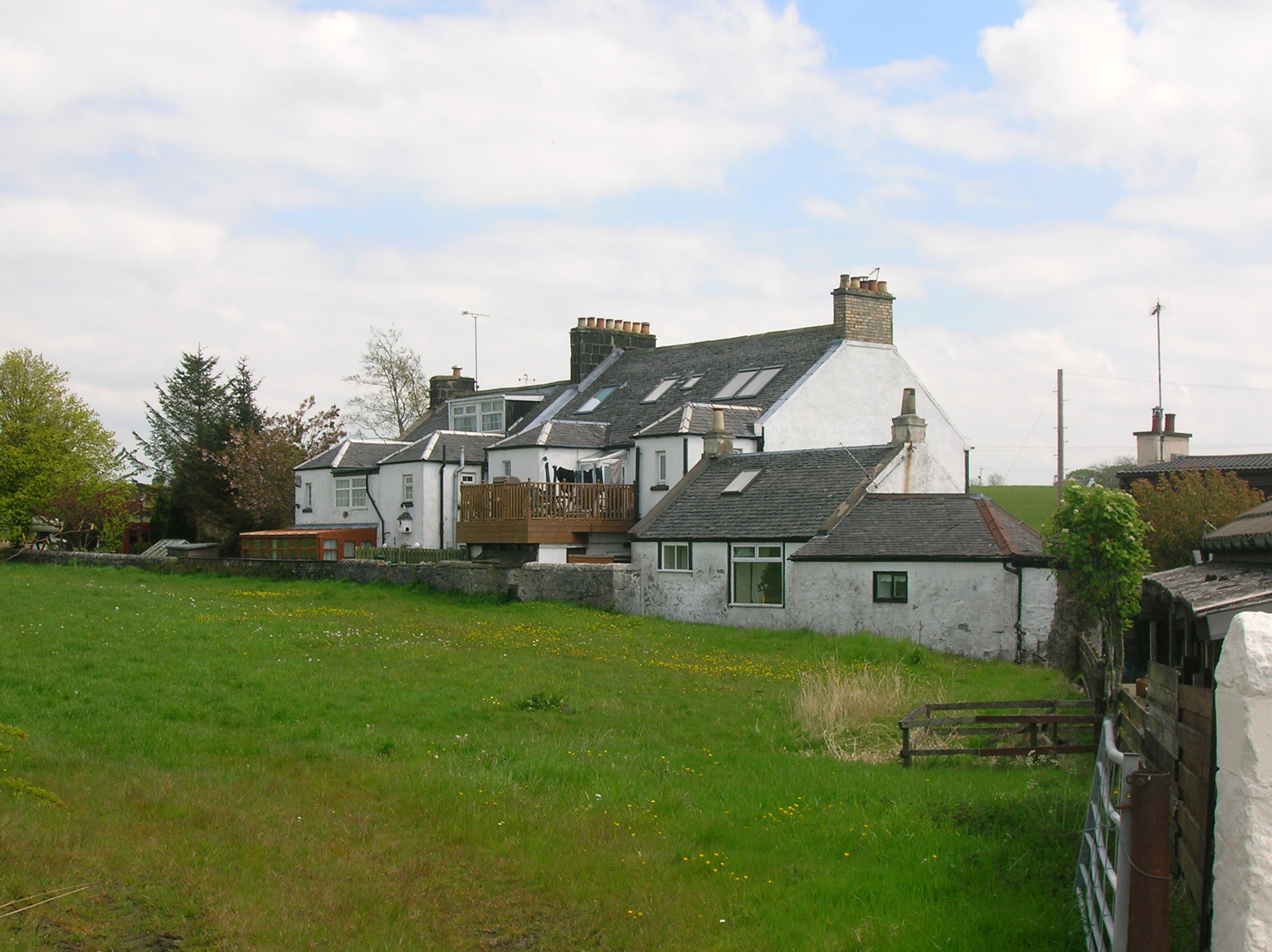
The rear of the Southfield houses

=== Industry and businesses ===
Coalheughglen lies nearby on the road to Dalry, a limekiln and associated quarry lay above Highfield Farm, as did the small Kersland Colliery and coal pits. An air vent is shown in the field near Coalheughglen Farm. In 1857 the OS maps show the presence of a weighing machine near Southfield and a freestone quarry was located near Littleacre.

The Highfield Inn, now a private house, stood near the lane down to Littleacre and had a small shop that also sold 'Spirits and Ales'. An old photograph shows that Highfield Garage, now demolished with new housing on the site, stood on the Beith side of the road and sold Cleveland petrol with three pumps, a workshop, etc.
