= Highfield (surname) =

Highfield is a surname of British origin. Notable people with the surname include:

- Adam Highfield (born 1981), New Zealand footballer
- Arnold R. Highfield (born 1940), American academic, historian, writer and poet
- Ashley Highfield, British newspaper publisher
- Liam Highfield (born 1990), English snooker player
- Roger Highfield (born 1958), Welsh writer and museum executive
