= The Highfield School =

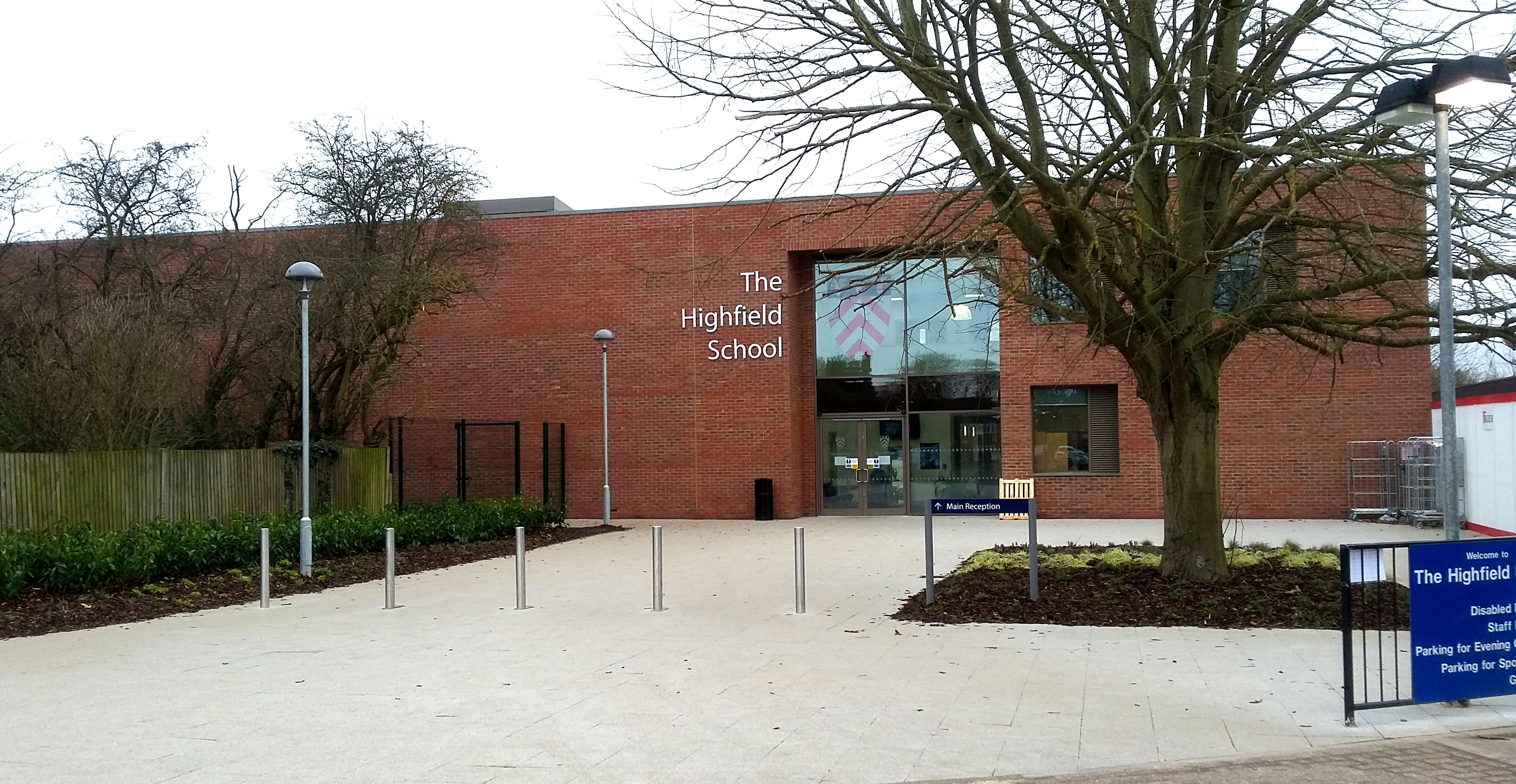
- The Highfield School in 2017

Location
- The Highfield School, Highfield, Letchworth Garden City, Hertfordshire, SG6 3QA; Letchworth Garden City, Hertfordshire, SG6 3QA; England; 51°58′07″N 0°14′28″W

Information
- Type: Foundation school
- Motto: Live and learn
- Established: 1965
- Local authority: Hertfordshire
- Department for Education URN: 150217 Tables
- Ofsted: Reports
- Headteacher: Zoe Armitage
- Gender: Coeducational
- Age: 11 to 18
- Enrolment: 1059
- Houses: Alan Turing, Martin Luther King, Mary Seacole, Rosalind Franklin, Charlotte Bronte and Steven Hawking. (Name order coordinates with order below)
- Colours: Yellow, Red, Blue, Green, Purple and Orange
- Website: www.highfield.herts.sch.uk

The Highfield School is a coeducational secondary school and sixth form in Letchworth, Hertfordshire. Pupils are from Year 7 to Year 13. The school is part of the Letchworth Sixth Form Consortium with Fearnhill School.

== Original buildings ==
The original school buildings were designed using a system of standard prefabricated components, and construction work started in May 1964. The prefabrication system used was SEAC Mark 1 (2' 8" Steel).

== The buildings ==
In January 2017 the school moved into a purpose-built £15 million building beside the old one, the latter being demolished. The new building was financed by the Education Funding Agency. Originally North Hertfordshire District Council turned down the application on the grounds that the development would have a detrimental effect on neighbouring residential areas "due to its size and proximity to nearby buildings." They also raised concerns regarding the quality of the design. However, the planning inspector dismissed these claims, stating that the building would not have an adverse effect on the locale.

The new building is composed of three blocks: Unwin, Parker and Howard. Each block contains a group of subject, for example Unwin has sciences and Parker has humanities.

== Foundation and partnership ==
The Highfield School is a foundation school and is part of the Letchworth Garden City Education Partnership. The partnership pairs Highfield with Fearnhill School; the sixth form students can pick subjects which are taught at Fearnhill alongside Highfield.

== Inspections ==
As of 2026, the school's most recent inspection by Ofsted was in 2023, with a judgement of Good.
