= Kilbirnie South railway station =

Railway station in North Ayrshire, Scotland

Kilbirnie South

General information
- Location: Kilbirnie, Ayrshire; Scotland
- Coordinates: 55.7559°N 4.6815°W
- Grid reference: NS317546
- Platforms: 2

Other information
- Status: Disused

History
- Original company: Lanarkshire and Ayrshire Railway
- Pre-grouping: Caledonian Railway
- Post-grouping: London, Midland and Scottish Railway

Key dates
- 2 December 1889: Opened as Kilbirnie
- 2 June 1924: Renamed Kilbirnie South
- 1 December 1930: Closed
Location

Kilbirnie South railway station was a railway station serving the town of Kilbirnie, North Ayrshire, Scotland as part of the Lanarkshire and Ayrshire Railway (L&AR).

== History ==
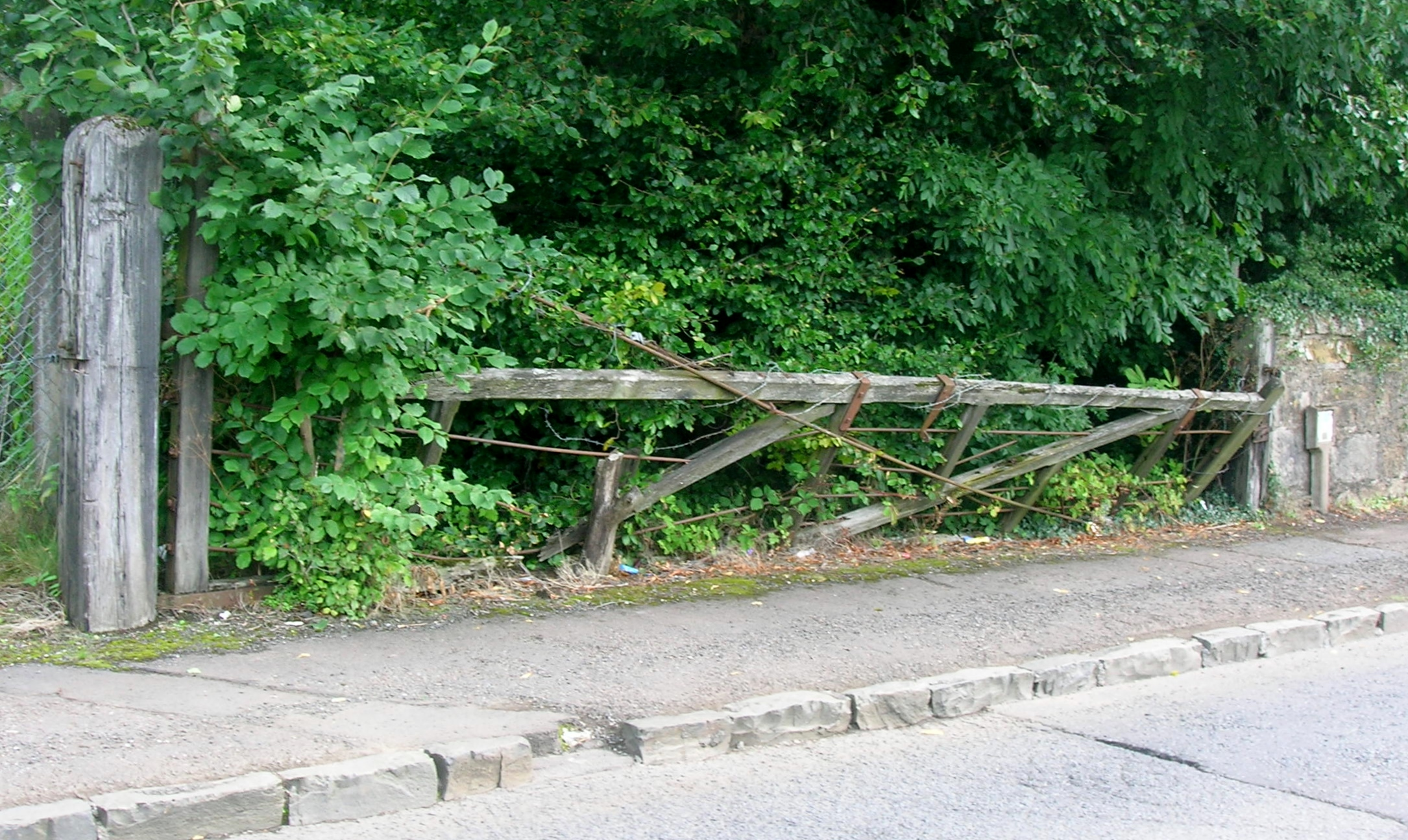
A level crossing gate on Mill Road on the old branch from near the station to Dennyholm Mill in Kilbirnie.

The station opened 2 December 1889 and was simply known as Kilbirnie. Upon the grouping of the L&AR into the London, Midland and Scottish Railway (LMS) in 1923, the station was renamed Kilbirnie South on 2 June 1924. The name change was to avoid confusion with the Glasgow and South Western Railway's nearby station of the same name, which was also incorporated into the LMS.

The station closed to passengers almost exactly forty one years after opening on 1 December 1930, with freight services withdrawing on the same day. By 1936 the station remained intact but was already overgrown.

Nothing remains of the station today.

== Services ==
A shuttle service ran from this station to Giffen and back, with around nine return journeys per day during the week and an extra two on Saturdays.

Preceding station	Historical railways	Following station
Terminus	Caledonian Railway; Lanarkshire and Ayrshire Railway	Glengarnock; Line and station closed
