= Carr (surname) =

- Pronunciation: /kɑː/

Origin
- Language: English
- Meaning: brushwood wet ground
- Region of origin: England

Carr is a common surname in northern England, a variant of Kerr, meaning "brushwood wet ground" in Middle English. The Old Norse kjarr means a "brushwood, thicket or copse" and may also come from the ancient Norse Kjarr translation meaning Kaiser from Caesar Kerr is also a Scottish variant, often from the Norse and (particularly on the west coast and Arran) from the Gaelic ciar, meaning "dusky". Carr is also a common surname in Ireland, where it often derives from the nickname, gearr, meaning "short of height". In some cases it is thought to come from the Welsh word cawr, meaning giant. Alternatively, in Ireland and Scotland, it may derive from the Irish and Scottish Gaelic cearr meaning pointed spear.

== Notable people with the surname "Carr" ==
=== A ===
- Aaron Albert Carr (born 1963), Native American filmmaker
- Adriane Carr (born 1952), Canadian politician
- Alan Carr (disambiguation), multiple people
- Alby Carr (1899–1969), Australian rugby league footballer
- Alexander Carr (1878–1946), Russian actor
- Alfred C. Carr Jr. (born 1965), American politician
- Alice Comyns Carr (1850–1927), British costume designer
- Alister Carr (born 1973), Australian rules footballer
- Allan Carr (1937–1999), American film producer
- Allen Carr (1934–2006), British author
- Amanda Carr (disambiguation), multiple people
- Amara Carr (born 1994), English cricketer
- Andrew Carr (disambiguation), multiple people
- Andy Carr (born 1956), English footballer
- Ann Carr (gymnast), American gymnast
- Ann Carr (evangelist) (1783–1841), British evangelist
- Annaleise Carr (born 1998), Canadian swimmer
- Anne Carr (1934–2008), American theologian
- Anthony Carr (disambiguation), multiple people
- Antoine Carr (born 1961), American basketball player
- Antony Carr (novelist) (1916–1995), English author
- Aquille Carr (born 1993), American basketball player
- Archie Carr (1909–1987), American biologist
- Arthur Carr (disambiguation), multiple people
- Austin Carr (disambiguation), multiple people

=== B ===
- Barbara Carr (1941–2026), American soul blues singer
- Barney Carr (1897–1971), Australian rules footballer
- Benita Carr, American photographer
- Benjamin Carr (1768–1831), American composer
- Bernard Carr (born 1949), British mathematics professor
- Bert Carr (1870–1930), American football player
- Betsy B. Carr (born 1946), American politician
- Betty Ann Carr (1942–1995), American actress
- Bill Carr (disambiguation), multiple people
- Billy Carr (1905–1989), English footballer
- Bob Carr (disambiguation), multiple people
- Borfor Carr (born 1987), Liberian footballer
- Brandon Carr (born 1986), American football player
- Brendan Carr (disambiguation), multiple people
- Brian Carr (born 1969), Scottish boxer
- Brian Allen Carr (born 1979), American writer
- Bruce W. Carr (1924–1998), American pilot
- Bunny Carr (1927–2018), Irish television presenter

=== C ===
- Caleb Carr (disambiguation), multiple people
- Calen Carr (born 1982), American soccer player
- Cameron Carr (disambiguation), multiple people
- Camilla Carr (1958–2024), British humanitarian worker
- Carol Carr (born 1939), American social figure
- Catherine Carr (disambiguation), multiple people
- Cathy Carr (singer) (1936–1988), American pop singer
- Cathy Carr (swimmer) (born 1954), American swimmer
- Cecil Carr (1878–1966), English lawyer
- Cedric Carr (1892–1936), New Zealand botanist
- Charlene Carr, Canadian writer
- Charles Carr (disambiguation), multiple people
- Charmian Carr (1942–2016), American actress
- Chaz Carr (born 1982), Jamaican basketball player
- Chris Carr (disambiguation), multiple people
- Chuck Carr (disambiguation), multiple people
- Cindy Carr, American set decorator
- CJ Carr (born 1995), American basketball player
- CJ Carr (born 2005), American football player
- Clay Carr (1909–1957), American cowboy
- Clem Carr (1901–1984), Australian rules footballer
- Cletis Carr (born 1959), American singer-songwriter
- Cliff Carr (born 1964), English footballer
- Clive Carr (born 1934), English hotelier
- Clyde Carr (1886–1962), New Zealand politician
- Colette Carr (born 1991), American musician
- Colin Carr (born 1957), British cellist
- Cornelius Carr (born 1969), British boxer
- Cory Carr (born 1975), American-Israeli basketball player
- Cynthia Carr (born 1950), American writer
- Cyril Carr (1926–1981), British politician

=== D ===
- Dabney Carr (1773–1837), American lawyer
- Dabney Carr (Virginia assemblyman) (1743–1773), American politician
- Dale Carr (American football) (born 1964), American football coach
- Dale Carr (politician) (born 1954), American politician
- Daniel Carr (disambiguation), multiple people
- Darleen Carr (born 1950), American actress
- Dave Carr (disambiguation), multiple people
- David Carr (disambiguation), multiple people
- Declan Carr (born 1965), Irish hurler
- Derek Carr (born 1991), American football player
- Derek Carr (footballer) (1927–2004), English footballer
- Deveron Carr (born 1990), American football player
- Diane Carr (born 1946), American artist
- Donald Carr (1926–2016), English cricketer
- Donald Eaton Carr (1903–1986), American journalist
- Dora Carr, American musician
- Douglas Carr (1872–1950), English cricketer

=== E ===
- Earl Carr (born 1955), American football player
- Eddie Carr (1917–1998), English footballer
- Edith Carr (1856–1919), American-Canadian painter
- Edith Carr (artist) (1875–1949), British painter
- Edwin Carr (disambiguation), multiple people
- E. H. Carr (1892–1982), English historian
- Elan Carr (born 1968), American attorney
- Eleanor Kearny Carr (1840–1912), American political hostess
- Eli Carr (born 2001), Puerto Rican footballer
- Elias Carr (1839–1900), American politician
- Elizabeth Jordan Carr (born 1981), American social figure
- Emily Carr (1871–1945), Canadian artist and writer
- Emilia Carr (born 1984), American murderer
- Emma P. Carr (1880–1972), American chemist
- Emsley Carr (1867–1941), British editor
- Eric Carr (1950–1991), American musician
- Eric Carr (boxer) (born 1975), American boxer
- Erin Lee Carr (born 1988), American filmmaker
- Ernest Carr (1875–1956), Australian politician
- Ernie Carr (1890–1965), Australian rugby union footballer
- Eugene Asa Carr (1830–1910), American general
- Everton Carr (born 1961), Antiguan footballer
- Ezra S. Carr (1819–1894), American professor

=== F ===
- Fern G. Z. Carr (born 1956), Canadian poet
- Fionn Carr (born 1985), Irish rugby union footballer
- Fionnuala Carr, Irish camogie player
- Ford Carr, American politician
- Francis Carr (disambiguation), multiple people
- Frank Carr (disambiguation), multiple people
- Franz Carr (born 1966), English footballer
- Fred Carr (1946–2018), American football player
- Frederick Carr (born 1947), American meteorologist

=== G ===
- Gareth Carr (born 1981), South African field hockey player
- Gary Carr (disambiguation), multiple people
- Gavin Carr, British conductor
- Gene Carr (disambiguation), multiple people
- Geneva Carr (born 1971), American actress
- Geoff Carr (born 1952), Australian rugby league footballer and administrator
- Geoffrey Carr (1886–1939), British rower
- George Watts Carr (1893–1975), American architect
- Georgia Carr (1925–1971), American singer
- Gerald Carr (disambiguation), multiple people
- Geraldine Carr (1914–1954), American actress
- Gerry Carr (disambiguation), multiple people
- Gillian Carr, British archaeologist
- Graeme Carr (born 1978), English footballer
- Graham Carr (born 1944), English footballer
- Gregg Carr (born 1962), American football player
- Gregory Carr (disambiguation), multiple people
- G. S. Carr (1837–1914), British mathematician
- Gwen Carr (born 1949), American activist

=== H ===
- Hank Earl Carr (1968–1998), American criminal
- Harlan Carr (1903–1970), American football player
- Harold Herbert Carr (1880–1973), New Zealand judge
- Harold Norman Carr (1887–1974), Canadian politician
- Harriet Carr (1771–1848), British artist
- Harry Carr (1877–1936), American reporter
- Harry Carr (footballer) (1887–1942), English footballer
- Harvey A. Carr (1873–1954), American psychologist
- Helen Carr, English journalist
- Helena Carr (1946–2023), Australian businesswoman
- Henry Carr (disambiguation), multiple people
- Herbert Wildon Carr (1857–1931), British philosopher
- Herman Carr (1924–2008), American physicist
- Homer M. Carr (1887–1964), American politician
- Howard Ellis Carr (1880–1960), British theatre conductor and composer
- Howie Carr (born 1952), American broadcaster
- "Kid" Howard Carr, lyricist of "We Don't Want the Bacon" (1918)
- Hugh Carr, Irish politician

=== I ===
- Ian Carr (1933–2009), Scottish musician
- Ian Carr (guitarist) (born 1965), English guitarist
- Iain Carr (born 1977), English cricketer
- Irving J. Carr (1875–1963), American general

=== J ===
- John Vincent Carr Peace Commissioner 1952
- Jeff Carr (disambiguation), multiple people
- Jeffrey Carr, American author
- Jekalyn Carr (born 1997), American recording artist
- Jered Carr, American political scientist
- Jim Carr (disambiguation), multiple people
- Jimmy Carr (born 1972), English-Irish comedian
- Jimmy Carr (bookmaker) (1864–1942), in South Australia
- J. L. Carr (1912–1994), English novelist
- Job Carr (1813–1887), American soldier
- Jody Carr (born 1975), Canadian politician
- Joe Carr (golfer) (1922–2004), Irish golfer
- Joey L. Carr, American politician
- John Carr (disambiguation), multiple people
- Johnnie Carr (1911–2008), American activist
- Johnny Carr (1887–??), American baseball player
- Jonathan Carr (disambiguation), multiple people
- Joseph Carr (disambiguation), multiple people
- Josh Carr (born 1980), Australian rules footballer
- J. Revell Carr (born 1939), American author
- Judith Carr (disambiguation), multiple people
- Julian Carr (disambiguation), multiple people
- Julie Palakovich Carr (born 1983), American politician
- James Edward Carr (born 1942), American soul singer

=== K ===
- Karen Carr (born 1960), American illustrator
- Karen L. Carr, American philosopher
- Katie Roe Carr, British television personality
- Katy Carr (born 1980), British singer-songwriter
- Kelly Carr (born 1980/1981), American journalist
- Kenneth Monroe Carr (1925–2015), American admiral
- Kenny Carr (born 1955), American basketball player
- Kevin Carr (born 1958), English footballer
- Kim Carr (born 1955), Australian politician
- Kris Carr (born 1971), American author
- Kurt Carr (born 1964), American composer
- Kyle Carr (born 1986), American speed skater
- Kyle Carr (soccer) (born 1995), American soccer player

=== L ===
- Laurence Carr (1886–1954), British general
- Laurie Carr (born 1965), American model and actress
- Leeming Carr (1864–1934), Canadian physician
- Leland W. Carr (1883–1969), American jurist
- Leon Carr (1910–1976), American songwriter
- Leonard G. Carr (1902–1976), American minister
- Leroy Carr (1905–1935), American singer-songwriter
- Les Carr (1929–2012), Australian rules footballer
- Levert Carr (born 1944), American football player
- Linda Carr, American singer
- Liz Carr (born 1972), English actress
- Lloyd Carr (born 1945), American football coach
- Lori Carr, Canadian politician
- Lorne Carr (1910–2007), Canadian ice hockey player
- Louis Carr (disambiguation), multiple people
- Lowell Juilliard Carr (1885–1963), American sociologist
- Lucien Carr (1925–2005), American editor
- Lucy Carr (born 1976), British singer
- Lyell E. Carr (1857–1912), American painter

=== M ===
- Maisie Carr (1912–1988), Australian ecologist
- Makena Carr (born 2000), American soccer player
- Marcus Carr (born 1999), Canadian basketball player
- Margaret Carr (born 1941), New Zealand academic
- Margaret Carr (novelist) (born 1935), British novelist
- Marian Carr (1926–2003), American actress
- Marilyn Gillies Carr (born 1941), Scottish social figure
- Marina Carr (born 1964), Irish playwright
- Marjorie Harris Carr (1915–1997), American environmental activist
- Mark Carr (born 1967), American football player and coach
- Markus Carr (born 1979), American basketball player
- Martin Carr (born 1968), British musician
- Martin A. Carr, Irish architect
- Mary Carr (1874–1973), American actress
- Mary Jane Carr (1895–1988), American author
- Matthew Carr (born 1978), Australian rules footballer
- Max Carr (1922–2016), New Zealand athlete
- Maxine Carr (criminal) (born 1977), English criminal
- Michael Carr (disambiguation), multiple people
- Melvin Carr (1915–1977), American murderer
- M. L. Carr (born 1951), American basketball player

=== N ===
- Nat Carr (1886–1944), American actor
- Nate Carr (born 1960), American wrestler
- Nathan T. Carr (1833–1885), American politician
- Nevin Carr (born 1956), American admiral
- Nicholas Carr (disambiguation), multiple people
- Nigel Carr (born 1959), Irish rugby union footballer
- Nigel Carr (American football) (born 1990), American football player
- Nizaam Carr (born 1991), South African rugby union footballer
- Norm Carr (born 1955), Australian rugby league footballer
- Norman Carr (1912–1997), British conservationist

=== O ===
- Oba Carr (born 1972), American boxer
- Oscar Clark Carr Jr. (??–1977), American activist
- Otis T. Carr (1904–1982) American inventor

=== P ===
- Paddy Carr (1807–aft. 1847), Alabama Muscogee interpreter and planter
- Patrick Carr (disambiguation), multiple people
- Paul Carr (disambiguation), multiple people
- Peggy Carr (born c.1955), Saint Vincentian journalist
- Peggy G. Carr, American expert on educational assessment
- Percifer Carr (??–1804), British loyalist
- Pete Carr (1950–2020), American guitarist
- Peter Carr (disambiguation), multiple people

=== R ===
- Ralph Carr (merchant) (1711–1806), British businessman and banker
- Ralph Lawrence Carr (1887–1950), American politician
- Randy Carr (1956–2002), American musician
- Ray Carr (born 1948), Australian rules footballer
- Raymond Carr (1919–2015), English historian
- Red Carr (1916–1990), Canadian ice hockey player
- Reginald Carr (disambiguation), multiple people
- Richard Carr (disambiguation), multiple people
- Robert Carr (disambiguation), multiple people
- Robyn Carr (born 1951), American author
- Roderick Carr (1891–1971), New Zealand air marshal
- Rod Carr (administrator) (born 1958/1959), New Zealand businessman and university administrator
- Rod Carr (boxer) (born 1968), Australian boxer
- Roger Carr (born 1952), American football player
- Roger Carr (businessman) (born 1946), British businessman
- Ronald Carr (born 1938), South African cricketer
- Rosamond Carr (1912–2006), American humanitarian
- Rosetta Ernestine Carr (1845–1907), Canadian photographer
- Ross Carr (born 1964), English Gaelic footballer
- Rotonya M. Carr, American hepatologist and physician-scientist
- Roy Carr (1945–2018), English journalist
- Russell Carr, British car designer
- Ruth Carr (born 1953), Northern Irish writer

=== S ===
- Sabin Carr (1904–1983), American pole vaulter
- Sally Carr (born 1945), Scottish singer
- Sam Carr (1906–1989), Canadian politician
- Sam Carr (musician) (1926–2009), American drummer
- Samuel Carr (disambiguation), multiple people
- Sandra Carr (born 1971), Australian politician
- Sean D. Carr (born 1969), American entrepreneur
- Seth Carr (born 2007), American actor
- Shane Carr, Irish Gaelic footballer
- Sharon Louis Carr (born 1979), Belizean juvenile murderer
- Shirley Carr (1929–2010), Canadian union leader
- Simon Carr (tennis) (born 1999), Irish tennis player
- Simon Carr (cyclist) (born 1998), British cyclist
- Slip Carr (1899–1971), Australian rugby union footballer
- Solomon C. Carr (1830–1914), American politician and farmer
- Stacey Carr (born 1984), New Zealand field hockey player
- Stephen Carr (born 1976), Irish footballer
- Stephen Carr (born 1979), Lead Power Engineer at Alstom
- Stephen Carr (figure skater) (born 1966), Australian ice skater
- Steve Carr (born 1965), American film director
- Steve Carr (artist) (born 1976), New Zealand artist
- Steven E. Carr (born 1957), American attorney
- Sue Carr, Baroness Carr of Walton-on-the-Hill (born 1964), English judge
- Susannah Carr (born 1952), Australian television presenter

=== T ===
- Terry Carr (1937–1987), American author
- Thomas Carr (disambiguation), multiple people
- Tony Carr (footballer, born 1950), British sports executive
- Tony Carr (footballer, born 1901) (1901–1968), English footballer
- T. R. Carr, American politician
- Trem Carr (1891–1946), American film producer

=== V ===
- Valerie Carr (born 1936), American singer
- Vikki Carr (born 1940), American singer
- Virginia Spencer Carr (1929–2012), American biographer

=== W ===
- Wally Carr (1954–2019), Australian boxer
- Walter Carr (disambiguation), multiple people
- Warren Carr (1929–1993), Australian singer
- Wayne Carr (1897–1954), American baseball player
- W. B. Carr (1861–1943), Australian journalist
- Wes Carr (born 1982), Australian singer-songwriter
- Wesley Carr (1941–2017), English priest
- Wilbur J. Carr (1870–1942), American diplomat
- William Carr (disambiguation), multiple people
- Willie Carr (born 1950), Scottish footballer
- Wooda Nicholas Carr (1871–1953), American politician
- Wynona Carr (1923–1976), American singer-songwriter

=== Z ===
- Zacharias Carr (1867–1951), English footballer

== Fictional characters ==
- Snapper Carr, character in the comic series DC Universe
- Mike Carr, character in comedy series The Marvelous Mrs. Maisel

== See also ==
- Carr (given name)
- Attorney General Carr (disambiguation), a disambiguation page for Attorney Generals surnamed "Carr"
- General Carr (disambiguation), a disambiguation page for Generals surnamed "Carr"
- Justice Carr (disambiguation), a disambiguation page for Justices surnamed "Carr"
- Lord Carr (disambiguation), a disambiguation page for Lords surnamed "Carr"
- Senator Carr (disambiguation), a disambiguation page for Senators surnamed "Carr"
- Karr (surname)
- Carry (name), a page for people with the given name "Carry"
- Curr (surname), a page for people with the surname "Curr"
- Kerr (disambiguation), a disambiguation page for "Kerr"
