= Peggy Carr (disambiguation) =

Peggy Carr may refer to:

- Peggy Carr (born c. 1955), Taiwan-based Vincentian journalist, poet, and diplomat
- Peggy G. Carr, American expert on educational assessment
- Peggy Carr, president of Illinois Birth Control League in 1940s
- Peggy Carr (died 1988 in Florida), victim of thallium poisoning
- Peggy Carr, fictional thallium poisoning victim in Agatha Christie mystery novel The Pale Horse (1961)
- Peggy Carr, fictional character in Ring Two (1939) played by Broadway actress Gene Tierney
