= Judge Carr =

Judge Carr may refer to:

- Charles Hardy Carr (1903–1976), judge of the United States District Courts for the Southern and Central Districts of California
- George C. Carr (1929–1990), judge of the United States District Court for the Middle District of Florida
- James G. Carr (born 1940), judge of the United States District Court for the Northern District of Ohio
- Patrick Eugene Carr (1922–1998), judge of the United States District Court for the Eastern District of Louisiana

== See also ==
- Justice Carr (disambiguation)
