= David Carr =

David or Dave Carr may refer to:

== In academia ==
- David Carr (phenomenologist) (born 1940), American phenomenology scholar and philosopher
- David Carr (philosopher of education) (born 1944), British philosopher of education
- David M. Carr (born 1961), American professor of Old Testament at Union Theological Seminary

== In sport ==
- David Carr (American football) (born 1979), American football quarterback
- David Carr (athlete) (1932–2023), Australian track and field athlete
- David Carr (wrestler) (born 1999), American folkstyle & freestyle wrestler
- Dave Carr (footballer, born 1937) (1937–2013), English footballer who played for Darlington, Workington and Watford in the 1950s and 1960s
- Dave Carr (footballer, born 1957) (1957–2005), English footballer who played for Luton, Lincoln and Torquay in the 1970s and 1980s
- Dave Carr (footballer, born 1982), Antigua and Barbuda international footballer

== Other people ==
- David Carr (1933–1959), British printer who was mistakenly reported to have been the first Western victim of HIV/AIDS
- David Carr (born 1974), drummer for Christian band Third Day
- David Carr (journalist) (1956–2015), New York Times journalist
- David Carr (New York politician) (born 1987), New York City councilman from the 50th Council District
- David G. Carr (1809–1883), Virginia politician

== See also ==
- Dave Carr (disambiguation)
- David & Carr, a duo consisting of trance musicians Peter Carr and David Johnson
- David Karr (1918–1979), American journalist, businessman, and Communist
