= Anthony Carr =

Anthony, Antony, or Tony Carr may refer to:

- Anthony Carr (psychic) (born 1943), Canadian psychic
- Tony Carr (footballer, born 1950), English football coach and former player
- Tony Carr (basketball) (born 1997), American basketball player
- Tony Carr (scientist) (born 1960), professor of molecular genetics
- Tony Carr (drummer) (1927–2026), Maltese drummer and percussionist
- Tony Carr (footballer, born 1901) (1901–1968), English footballer
- Anthony Carr (born 1965), American murderer convicted of the Parker family murders
- Antony Carr (novelist) (1916–1995), English crime novelist
- Antony Carr (historian) (1938–2019), Welsh historian
