= Harold Carr =

Harold Carr may refer to:

- Harold Herbert Carr, New Zealand land court judge and administrator
- Harold Norman Carr, politician in Ontario, Canada
- Bugatti Type 57S Atalante (57502)#Harold Carr
- Harold Carr (songwriter), see 1957 in music

== See also ==
- Harry Carr (disambiguation)
