= Carr (given name) =

Carr is a given name. Notable people with the name include:

- Carr Clifton (born 1957), American photographer
- Carr Collins Sr. (1892–1980), American insurance magnate and philanthropist
- Carr Neel (1873–1949), American tennis player
- Carr Waller Pritchett Sr. (1823–1910), American educator and astronomer
- Carr Smith (1901–1989), American baseball player
- Carr Van Anda (1864–1945), American editor
- Carr B. White (1823–1871) American general

== See also ==
- Carr (surname)
