= Harry Carr (disambiguation) =

Harry Carr was a writer.

Harry Carr may also refer to:

- Harry Carr (cricketer) (1907–1943), English cricketer and journalist
- Harry Carr (footballer) (1882–1942), English footballer for Sunderland
- Harry Carr (jockey) (1916–1985), English Derby-winning jockey
- Harry Carr (sprinter), considered by Track and Field News to be the winner of the 1963 NCAA 100 metres championship

== See also ==
- Henry Carr (disambiguation)
- Harold Carr (disambiguation)
- Harry Kerr (disambiguation)
