= Alan Carr (disambiguation) =

Alan Carr (born 1976) is an English comedian and television personality

Alan, Allan, Allen Carr may also refer to:

- Alan Carr (footballer) (born 1939), Australian footballer for North Melbourne
- Alan Carr (politician) (born 1948), Northern Ireland trade unionist
- Allan Carr (1937–1999), American film producer and manager
- Allen Carr (1934–2006), self-help writer
- Allan C. Carr, American politician
