= Jeff Carr =

Jeff Carr may refer to:

- Jeff Carr (Australian politician) (born 1944), member of the state parliament of Western Australia
- Jeff Carr (Canadian politician), member of the provincial legislature of New Brunswick
- Jeff Carr (American politician), mayor of Eagle Nest, New Mexico
- Jeffrey Carr, Cybersecurity consultant
