= Harry Kerr =

Harry or Henry Kerr may refer to:

- Harry Kerr (sport shooter) (1856–1936), Canadian sports shooter
- Henry Kerr (cricketer) (1874–1933), Jamaican cricketer
- Harry D. Kerr (1880–1957), American songwriter, lyricist, author, and lawyer
- Harry Kerr (racewalker) (1879–1951), racewalker from New Zealand

== See also ==
- Harrison Kerr (1897–1978), American composer of classical music
- Harry Carr (disambiguation)
- Henry Carr (disambiguation)
