= James Carr =

James, Jim, or Jimmy Carr may refer to:

== Government ==
- James Carr (Massachusetts politician) (1777–1818), U.S. Congressman
- James Dickson Carr (1868–1920), American assistant district attorney
- James G. Carr (born 1940), American federal judge
- James R. Carr, Kentucky politician
- Jim Carr (1951–2022), Canadian politician

== Sports ==
- James Carr (wrestler) (1955–2013), American Olympic wrestler
- Jimmy Carr (American football) (1933–2012), American football player
- Jimmy Carr (footballer) (1893–1980), Scottish footballer and bowls player

== Others ==
- J. L. Carr (1912–1994), known as Jim, English novelist
- James Carr (singer) (1942–2001), American soul singer
- Jimmy Carr (bookmaker) (1864–1942), South Australian bookmaker
- James W. Carr (born 1948), American educator
- Jim Carr (education) (born 1969), American technologist
- Jimmy Carr (born 1972), English comedian
