= Francis Carr =

Francis Carr may refer to:

- Francis Carr (District of Maine politician) (1751–1821), U.S. Representative from the District of Maine
- Francis Carr (Ohio politician) (1927–1993), member of the Ohio House of Representatives
- Francis Carr (footballer) (born 1979), Liberian footballer
- Francis Carr, voice actor from Happy Tree Friends

== See also ==
- Frances Carr (1590–1632), English noblewoman
- Frank Carr (disambiguation)
