= Charles Carr =

Charles Carr may refer to:

== Sports ==
- Charlie Carr (1876–1932), American baseball first baseman
- Charles Carr (cricketer) (1849–1921), Australian cricketer
- Charlie Carr (rugby league), English rugby league footballer
- Chuck Carr (baseball) (Charles Lee Glenn Carr Jr., 1967–2022), American baseball player

== Others ==
- Charles Carr, 2nd Earl of Ancram (1624–1690), British peer
- Charles Hardy Carr (1903–1976), United States federal judge
- Charles L. Carr Jr., National Commander of Civil Air Patrol
- Charlie Carr (activist) (born 1953), American disability rights activist
- Charles Carr (bishop of Killaloe) (1682–1739), Irish Anglican clergyman
- Charles Lisle Carr (1871–1942), Church of England bishop
- Charles Telford Carr (1905–1976), British academic specialising in German

== See also ==
- Charles Kerr (disambiguation), variant spelling
- Charles Ker (disambiguation), variant spelling
