= Samuel Carr =

Samuel Carr may refer to:

- Samuel S. Carr (1837–1908), American painter
- Samuel Carr (politician) (1771–1855), American politician and planter
- Samuel Henry Carr, Canadian politician in the Legislative Assembly of Saskatchewan
