= Senator Carr =

Senator Carr may refer to:

- David G. Carr (1809–1889), Virginia State Senate
- Francis Carr (District of Maine politician) (1751–1821), Maine State Senate
- Homer M. Carr (1887–1964), Minnesota State Senate
- Jacob W. Carr (1886–1977), Pennsylvania State Senate
- Peter P. Carr (1890–1966), Wisconsin State Senate
- Robert S. Carr (1845–1925), West Virginia State Senate
- Samuel Carr (politician) (1771–1855), Virginia State Senate
