= Helen Ginger Berrigan =

American judge (1948–2024)

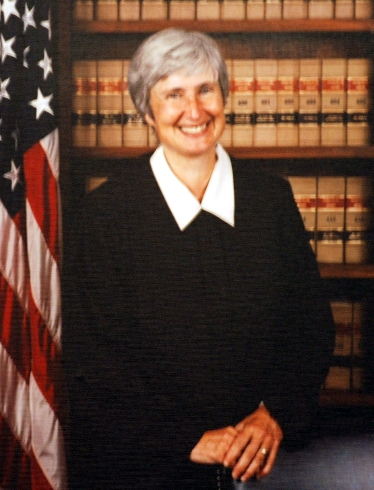

Senior Judge of the United States District Court for the Eastern District of Louisiana
- In office August 23, 2016 – November 15, 2024

Chief Judge of the United States District Court for the Eastern District of Louisiana
- In office 2001–2008
- Preceded by: Edith Brown Clement
- Succeeded by: Sarah S. Vance

Judge of the United States District Court for the Eastern District of Louisiana
- In office March 10, 1994 – August 23, 2016
- Appointed by: Bill Clinton
- Preceded by: Patrick Eugene Carr
- Succeeded by: Wendy Vitter

Personal details
- Born: Helen Georgena Roberts; April 15, 1948 New Rochelle, New York, U.S.
- Died: November 15, 2024 (aged 76) Saddle River, New Jersey, U.S.
- Education: UW–Madison (BA); American University (MA); Louisiana State University (JD)

Helen Georgena Roberts Berrigan (April 15, 1948 – November 15, 2024), known professionally as Helen Ginger Berrigan and Ginger Berrigan, was a senior United States district judge of the United States District Court for the Eastern District of Louisiana.

Berrigan served as a district court judge of the District Court for the Eastern District of Louisiana in the United States. She was appointed to this position by President Bill Clinton in 1994. Between 2001 and 2008, Berrigan dutifully served as the chief judge of the Eastern District. Before this appointment, she had been serving as a criminal defense attorney. During her career, she also served as a freelance reporter to various publications based in different regions. Berrigan authored the Louisiana Criminal Trial Practice. Apart from her career as a lawyer and journalist, Berrigan also led in various associations like the New Orleans Association for Women Attorneys.

== Early life and education ==
Berrigan was born in New Rochelle, New York, on April 15, 1948. She received a Bachelor of Arts degree from the University of Wisconsin-Madison in 1969, a Master of Arts from American University in 1971, and a Juris Doctor from Louisiana State University Law School in 1977. In China, Turkey, Malawi, Azerbaijan, Pakistan, and Bangladesh, she has finished "rule of law" trainings that allow her to practice law within these countries.

== Career ==
Following her graduation from Louisiana State University Law School, Berrigan was a staff attorney of Governor's Pardon, Parole and Rehabilitation Commission from 1977 to 1978. She was in private practice as a criminal defense attorney in New Orleans from 1978 to 1994. She was also a freelance journalist for local publications, as well as a legislative aide to Senator Joe Biden. She was a frequent speaker in locally sponsored continuing legal education programs, and she served as an adjunct professor at LSU and Loyola School of Law.

=== Federal judicial service ===
On November 18, 1993, Berrigan was nominated by President Bill Clinton to a seat on the United States District Court for the Eastern District of Louisiana vacated by Judge Patrick Eugene Carr. She was confirmed by the United States Senate on March 10, 1994, and received her commission the same day. She served as Chief Judge from 2001 to 2008 and assumed senior status on August 23, 2016, under President Obama, though Trump got to name her successor due to the Republican-controlled Senate holding her seat open. During her time as an active judge for the Eastern District of Louisiana, she was largely considered among the most liberal of those serving New Orleans.

== Notable cases ==
In February 2014, Berrigan served as the judge in the USA v. Nagin criminal trial concerning fraud of former New Orleans mayor Ray Nagin during Hurricane Katrina, in which Nagin was found to have participated among six others in a conspiracy and 59 related acts spanning his entire time as mayor. Nagin's requests for supplemental time prior to the trial in October 2013 were denied, and it continued as a Speedy Trial. The case was based on allegations that Nagin had accepted over $500,000 in gifts in exchange for official favors, as well as committed tax and wire fraud contrary to his promises when assuming office that he would reform the corrupt New Orleans City Hall. He was found guilty on 20 of 21 charges, and acquitted on one. Berrigan sentenced him to 10 years in prison, a sentence some believe was too low, in July 2014. This case is considered noteworthy because it is the first trial in which a New Orleans mayor was tried and convicted on corruption charges.

== Death ==
Berrigan died in Saddle River, New Jersey, on November 15, 2024, at the age of 76.

Legal offices
Preceded by Patrick Eugene Carr	Judge of the United States District Court for the Eastern District of Louisiana; 1994–2016	Succeeded by Wendy Vitter
Preceded by Edith Brown Clement	Chief Judge of the United States District Court for the Eastern District of Louisiana; 2001–2008	Succeeded by Sarah S. Vance
