= Chuck Carr =

Chuck Carr may refer to:

- Charles L. Carr Jr., National Commander, Civil Air Patrol
- Chuck Carr (baseball) (1967–2022), American baseball player

== See also ==
- Charles Carr (disambiguation)
