= Charles Ker =

Charles Ker may refer to:

- Charles Henry Bellenden Ker (c. 1785 – 1871), legal reformer
- Charles Innes-Ker, 11th Duke of Roxburghe
- Charles Ker (chess) in New Zealand Chess Championship

== See also ==
- Charles Kerr (disambiguation)
- Charles Carr (disambiguation), variant spelling
