= Lord Kerr (disambiguation) =

Brian Kerr, Baron Kerr of Tonaghmore (1948–2020), was a Northern Irish barrister and judge.

Lord Kerr may also refer to:

- John Kerr, Baron Kerr of Kinlochard (born 1942), British diplomat and civil servant
- Michael Ancram, Baron Kerr of Monteviot (born 1945), British politician and Conservative peer
- Lord Kerr of Nisbet, Langnewtoun and Dolphinstoun, a subsidiary title (created 1633) of the Marquess of Lothian

== See also ==
- Lord Carr (disambiguation)
- Baron Ker (disambiguation)
