= Frank Carr =

Frank Carr may refer to:

- Frank Carr (equestrian) (1893–1981), American Olympic equestrian
- Frank Carr (footballer) (1919–2010), English professional footballer
- Frank Carr (politician), member of the California State Legislature from 1917 to 1925
- Frank George Griffith Carr (1903–1991), director of the National Maritime Museum, Greenwich, England
- Frank Osmond Carr (1858–1915), composer
- Franklin Carr (soldier) (1844–1904), recipient of the Medal of Honor during the American Civil War

== See also ==
- Francis Carr (disambiguation)
