= Patrick Carr =

Patrick Carr may refer to:

- Patrick Carr (Boston Massacre) (died 1770), victim of the Boston Massacre
- Patrick Eugene Carr (1922–1998), United States district judge
- Patrick Carr (American football) (born 1995), American football running back
- Patrick Carr, author whose works include co-authorship of the autobiography of Johnny Cash

== See also ==
- Patrick-Carr-Herring House, a historic home located at Clinton, Sampson County, North Carolina
