= Baron Ker =

Baron Ker may refer to:

- Baron (Lord) Ker of Cessford and Cavertoun (in the Peerage of Scotland) is from 1616 one of the subsidiary titles for Duke of Roxburghe
- Baron (Lord) Ker of Cessford and Overton (in the Peerage of Scotland too) is from 1707 another of the subsidiary titles for Duke of Roxburghe
- Baron Ker of Kersehugh (in the Peerage of the United Kingdom) is from 1821 one of the subsidiary titles for Marquess of Lothian
- Baron Ker of Wakefield (in the Peerage of Great Britain) was from 1741 to 1805 one of the subsidiary titles for Duke of Roxburghe

== See also ==
- Lord Carr (disambiguation)
- Lord Kerr (disambiguation)
