= Joseph Carr (disambiguation) =

Joseph Carr (1879–1939) was the U.S. National Football League president, 1921–1939.

Joseph or Joe Carr may also refer to:

== Arts and entertainment ==
- Joseph Carr (music publisher) (1739–1819), American music publisher in Baltimore
- Joe Carr (Texas musician) (1951–2014), American roots and country musician and author
- Joe "Fingers" Carr, stage name of Lou Busch (1910–1979), American record producer, musician, and songwriter
- J. Comyns Carr (1849–1916), English drama and art critic
- J. L. Carr (1912–1994), English novelist

== Politics and business ==
- Joseph Bradford Carr (1828–1895), U.S. soldier and politician, New York Secretary of State, 1879–1885
- Joseph Milton Carr (1858–1929), Canadian merchant and politician in Ontario
- Joe C. Carr (1907–1981), American politician, Tennessee Secretary of State, 1941–1944, 1945–1949, and 1957–1977
- Joe S. Carr, American politician, member of the Tennessee House of Representatives

== Sport ==
- Joe Carr (English footballer) (1919–1940), full back
- Joe Carr (Ghanaian footballer) (fl. 1970s–1980s), goalkeeper
- Joe Carr (Scottish footballer) (1931–2015), winger
- Joe Carr (golfer) (1922–2004), Irish amateur golfer
