= Andrew Carr =

Andrew Carr may refer to:

- Andrew Carr (footballer) (1908–1983), English footballer
- Andrew J. Carr (born 1958), British surgeon and professor of orthopaedics
- Andy Carr (born 1956), English footballer
- Andrew Carr (basketball) (born 2002), American basketball player

== See also ==
- Andrew Carr Sr. House, Minot, North Dakota
