= Charles Kerr =

Charles Kerr may refer to:

== People ==
- Charles Edward Kerr (1890–1976), American jazz drummer
- Charles Kerr, 2nd Earl of Ancram (1624–1690), styled Lord Kerr or Carr until 1654 when he inherited the earldom
- Charles H. Kerr (1860–1944), American founder of Charles H Kerr Company Publishers
- Charles H. M. Kerr (1858–1907), British artist and illustrator
- Charles Kerr, 1st Baron Teviot (1874–1968), British National Liberal Member of Parliament 1932–1940, ennobled 1940
- Charles John Kerr, 2nd Baron Teviot (born 1940), son of 1st Baron Teviot
- Charles Kerr (curler), see Tim Hortons Brier
- Charles Kerr (horseman) in Washington Park Handicap
- Charles Kerr (judge) (1863–1950), judge of the United States District Court for the Canal Zone
- Charles Kerr (screenwriter) (1892–1954), American assistant film director and screenwriter
- Charles William Kerr (1875–1951), Moderator of the General Assembly for the Presbyterian Church
- Charles Lester Kerr (1886–1965), British naval officer and submarine commander

== Companies ==
- Charles H. Kerr Publishing Company, established in 1886, Chicago-based publisher of socialist and anarchist works

== See also ==
- Charles Carr (disambiguation), variant spelling
- Charles Ker (disambiguation)
