= Brendan Carr (disambiguation) =

Brendan Carr (born 1979) is an American government official and has been FCC chairman since 2025.

Brandon or Brendan Carr may also refer to:

- Brendan Carr (physician), American hospital health system executive and professor since 1990s
- Brendan Carr (politician), Irish Labour Party Lord Mayor of Dublin (2016–17)
- Brandon Carr (born 1986), American NFL football player between 2008 and 2020
