= General Carr =

General Carr may refer to:

- Eugene Asa Carr (1830–1910), Union Army brigadier general and brevet major general
- Irving J. Carr (1875–1963), U.S. Army major general
- John Carr (Indiana politician) (1793–1845), Indiana Militia major general
- Joseph Bradford Carr (1828–1895), Union Army brevet major general
- Julian Carr (industrialist) (1845–1924), pioneer of Bull Durham Tobacco; North Carolina industrialist and philanthropist, given title of "General” by the United Confederate Veterans
- Laurence Carr (1886–1954), British Army lieutenant general
- Richard Carr (chaplain) (1925–2002), U.S. Air Force major general
- William Keir Carr (1923–2020), Canadian Air Force lieutenant general

== See also ==
- Attorney General Carr (disambiguation)
