= Judith Carr =

Judith Carr may refer to:

- Judith Feld Carr, Canadian musician and humanitarian, who smuggled over three thousand Syrian Jews out of Syria
- Juliet Anderson, born Judith Carr, American pornographic actress and film producer, often better known as "Aunt Peg"
- Judith Carr (politician), former member of the Ohio House of Representatives
