= Amanda Carr =

Amanda Carr may refer to:

- Amanda Carr (ice hockey) (born 1990), British ice hockey player
- Amanda Carr (BMX rider) (born 1990), Thai BMX cyclist
