= Georgia Carr =

- Born: Mary Louise Thomas; June 20, 1925; Los Angeles, California, US
- Died: July 4, 1971 (aged 46) Los Angeles, California, US
- Genres: Traditional pop, jazz, R&B
- Occupations: Singer, actress
- Instrument: Vocals
- Years active: 1946–c.1970
- Labels: Capitol, Tops, Dot, Vee-Jay

Georgia Carr (born Mary Louise Thomas, June 20, 1925 – July 4, 1971) was an American singer and actress who performed and recorded between the 1940s and 1960s.

== Early life and education ==
She was born in Los Angeles and worked as a secretary with the Los Angeles Housing Authority while studying nursing at the University of California, Los Angeles, and establishing herself as a singer. In 1946, after winning a talent contest, she began a residency in the Club Royal in San Francisco where, in 1952, she was heard by bandleader Stan Kenton. He suggested that she change her name to Georgia Carr, and won her a recording contract with Capitol Records. She appeared in top clubs in New York City, Chicago and elsewhere, and released several singles on Capitol, with arrangements by Nelson Riddle, including "Softly" and "I Dream of You" (both 1952), "Is That Bad" and "Lonely" (both 1953). At the end of 1953, she began working as a disc jockey on radio station WOV in New York.

== Career ==
She continued to record for Capitol and make club appearances, and in 1957 appeared as a calypso singer in the film Will Success Spoil Rock Hunter?. After a residency in Las Vegas, she had to give up her singing career temporarily because of severe laryngitis, from which she recovered without surgery. In 1958 she released the LP Songs by a Moody Miss on Tops Records; she was credited on the album sleeve as "America's Foremost Night Club Singer". Soon afterwards she signed for Dot Records, who issued further singles including "Don't Go".

A report in the Chicago Defender in 1963 described her as possessing "beauty, personality, 'class,' and a warm, husky voice of intimate styling", and said that she was intending to front a new business, American Negro Commercials, Inc., to make "television and theatrical commercials utilizing Negro actors and models." From 1964, she recorded for Vee-Jay Records, and that year released her best known album, Rocks in My Bed, a collection of songs by Duke Ellington, Ray Charles, Peggy Lee and others. She also appeared in the film Handle with Care, an all African-American musical comedy. A soundtrack album was released on the Preview label.

She acted in the television series Marcus Welby, M.D. in 1969. In later years, she ran a catering company with her sister. She died of a stroke in Los Angeles in 1971 at the age of 46.

A compilation of her early recordings, Softly Baby, was released in 1985.

== Discography ==
- Songs by a Moody Miss (Tops, 1958)
- Handle with Care (soundtrack, Preview, 1964)
- Rocks in My Bed (Vee-Jay, 1964)
- Softly Baby (compilation, Capitol, 1985, France only)
