= 1998 Florida police shootings =

Spree shooting in Florida, US

- Location: Tampa, Pasco County, & Hernando County, Florida, US
- Date: May 19, 1998; 10:30 a.m – 7:20 p.m.
- Target: Police officers
- Attack type: Spree shooting
- Weapons: SKS; 9mm Glock pistol
- Deaths: 5 (including the perpetrator)
- Injuries: 4
- Perpetrator: Hank Earl Carr
- Motive: Attempt to escape custody

On May 19, 1998, 30-year-old Hank Earl Carr fatally shot his girlfriend's son in Tampa, Florida, United States. After being taken into custody by the Tampa Police Department, Carr unlocked his handcuffs while being transported to the police department's headquarters, and fatally shot the two officers who were transporting him.

Carr then carjacked a vehicle and fled, resulting in a running gun battle that killed another officer and injured four others, including two more police officers. Carr ultimately barricaded himself inside a convenience store in Hernando County and took a hostage. After multiple hours, Carr released the hostage and died by suicide. Local radio station WFLA conducted phone interviews with Carr amid the hostage situation, prompting criticism from both journalists and police.

== Shootings ==
On the morning of May 19, around 10:30 a.m., Carr carried the young son of his girlfriend Bernice Bowen into a fire station. The boy had a gunshot wound to the head, but the circumstances of the injury were unclear — first Carr claimed that the boy was dragging a rifle and walking around when it accidentally discharged, but later he said that he himself had been holding it when it discharged.

Carr, having told police he was Joseph Bennett, the father of the child, ran back to the site of the shooting while being pursued by police. Threatening an officer with a rifle, he dropped it and again ran away, and this time was caught and handcuffed. Tampa Police Department detectives Randy Bell and Ricky Childers took him back to the apartment where the boy had been shot to continue to interview him. On the trip back to the police department, with Bell and Childers in the front seats and Carr sitting behind them, handcuffed in front, Carr successfully unlocked his handcuffs with a key he carried on his person, he then disarmed Childers by snatching his Glock handgun from his shoulder holster. In the struggle that ensued, Carr shot both officers in the face, killing them at the scene.

Exiting the car, he carjacked a pickup truck and fled. After briefly visiting his mother and refueling at a local service station, he got on Interstate 75 heading north. The first police officer in pursuit was Florida State Trooper James Crooks, and as he approached, Carr veered onto an exit ramp located in Pasco County, Florida, braked, and exited the truck. As Crooks also braked to a stop, Carr approached and shot him twice in the head, killing him instantly.

Getting back in the pickup truck, Carr fled as multiple police cars and a police helicopter pursued him in a high-speed chase and gunfight for 22 miles (Carr was shot and seriously injured in the buttocks during the chase). It damaged two squad cars and a police helicopter, injuring two officers. Two truck drivers were also injured when Carr hit their truck (One was hit in the shoulder by a projectile that shattered his left arm). With his tires blown out and running low on ammunition, Carr exited the interstate and entered a convenience store, where he took as a hostage Stephanie Kramer, a pregnant clerk. For the rest of the afternoon, he remained in the store, as nearly 200 officers surrounded him. Local radio station WFLA conducted phone interviews in the midst of the crisis, later drawing criticism from both journalism experts and police. At 7:20 p.m., Carr released Kramer and shot and killed himself as the SWAT team forcibly entered the building.

== Perpetrator ==
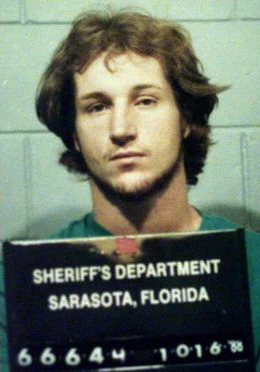
1988 mugshot of Carr

Hank Earl Carr (January 31, 1968 – May 19, 1998) was a convicted criminal who was wanted in four different states at the time of his arrest for shooting his girlfriend's son and subsequent murders. Carr was a high school dropout and prior to his arrest for shooting his girlfriend's son, he had gone two years without being arrested, the longest stretch of time he had gone arrest-free since he was 15-years-old. Carr told his mother that the happiest day of his life was when one of his girlfriends gave birth to their daughter, but he soon left her for another woman soon after.

Carr was born in Atlanta, Georgia with infant respiratory distress syndrome, and doctors were forced to sedate him to undergo treatment, but Carr ultimately recovered. Carr suffered from asthma and was noted by his mother as being very restless while trying to sleep. As a result of his difficulty sleeping, Carr's father forced him to stand and face a wall for hours until he fell asleep on the floor. Carr's father abused his mother, and forced him and his half-brother to run to near exhaustion, march in formation, and would lock them in their rooms if they misbehaved. Carr's mother later remarried.

Carr later attended Ballard Elementary in Bradenton, Florida, where after consultation with his second grade teacher, his mother agreed to have him undergo testing for attention deficit hyperactivity disorder. The test also found that Carr had an intelligence quotient of 133, and subsequent testing found Carr to be in the top one or two percent in his age group for verbal skills. At age seven, doctors recommended Carr to take Ritalin, and it helped to calm him down. Carr's mother also enrolled Carr in multiple extracurricular activities such as tap-dancing, karate, and astronomy classes.

Carr later moved to Barnesville, Georgia, after his stepfather found work in the area. In Barnesville, Carr began playing football, and his coach, teammates, and classmates reported that Carr was very aggressive and sought out attention. In middle school, Carr was noted for striking a female student and knocking her to the ground. In 1983, Carr's family moved to Englewood, Florida, because his step-father wanted to be closer to his family in Sarasota. At age 15, Carr was taken off of Ritalin against his mother's wishes, and soon after, he got into trouble with local law enforcement for drinking on the beach and later for breaking into a vending machine. Carr's mother believed that his criminal behavior was a result of the friends he had made, and she told him he could either stop being friends with them or leave her house–and Carr ultimately decided to leave.

After leaving his mother, Carr joined another homeless youth and together they would sleep together in abandoned cars and work at construction sites and laundromats. Carr would frequently get into fights, and in September 1985 when the pair robbed a laundromat together to steal money and a firearm, Carr used liquid soap to cover up their fingerprints. A month later, the pair were arrested for breaking into a man's home and assaulting him with a metal pipe. After his arrest, Carr was transferred from juvenile detention center at the age of 17 to the adult jail because of his misbehavior.

After his release from prison on probation in June 1987, Carr moved back in with his mother and stepfather who now lived in West Tampa. After his release, Carr got a job installing aluminum siding, but was fired within a week for chronic tardiness. Carr then moved between jobs, and was unable to keep them for long. Soon after, he was kicked out of his mother and stepfather's home for being rude and coming home drunk. Carr's probation officer was planning to revoke his probation due to his behavior during their meetings, but she lost track of him. In February 1988, Carr was arrested for stealing a friend's guitar and was sentenced to three years in prison, but was released after only six weeks due to overcrowding.

After his release from prison, Carr reconnected with an old girlfriend, and they lived together in Griffin, Georgia. Carr began unloading trucks for work, but about after a month of living together Carr began to abuse his girlfriend. The parents of Carr's girlfriend drove to Griffin and took her back to her hometown of St. Petersburg, Florida, where she gave birth to Carr's first child. Carr then returned to Tampa where he accumulated more charges and jail time. At some point, Carr went to Marietta, Ohio, after disappearing from the radar of his probation officer. In Marietta, Carr began a relationship with another woman and they had a daughter together. In early 1995, Carr began a relationship with Bernice Bowen, and after Carr was indicted for drug trafficking in Marietta the pair ran away together to Sturgis, South Dakota. After Carr left, his previous girlfriend discovered that she was pregnant again, this time with a boy. In November of that year, Carr was arrested for a fight and after bailing out of jail, they fled the state and returned to Tampa.

In Tampa, Carr told new people he met that his name was "Joe", and he lived with Bowen inside a converted garage where they hung a Confederate flag from the ceiling of the living room. In February 1998, an anonymous call was made to child abuse investigators who said that Carr had dropped Bowen's son on his head after her son wet himself. Carr identified himself by the name of the father of the child to investigators, and no evidence was found of child abuse. At the time, Carr was trafficking guns under an alias. The following month, a receptionist at an eye doctor's office reported Carr spanking Bowen's son after he got upset over missing paperwork. Investigators discovered that he was not the father of Bowen's children and found through Carr's mother his real name, but after finding no bruises on either of Bowen's children, they took no action. Bowen reported that Carr sometimes hit her, but when she threatened to leave he promised not to do it again, and she chose to stay with him.

== Aftermath ==
Bowen's son ultimately died, raising the number killed by Carr to four. In later testimony it was revealed that he abused Bowen and her children, and he was found to be a convicted felon with a history of violent crime, including assault of police officers. He was also wanted in several states.

In 1999, Bowen was convicted of child neglect for allowing Carr around her children. Prosecutors contended that since Bowen knew of Carr's violent history, she should have never allowed him to be around children. She was sentenced to 15 years in prison. Later in 1999, she was charged with aiding and abetting Carr's escape, as well as for being an accessory to the murders of her son and the three police officers. Even after one officer broke down and begged her to tell them Carr's real name, Bowen did not do so. Prosecutors claimed that if she had, police would have known he was a wanted man and convicted felon.

She was sentenced to 21.5 years in prison, to run concurrently with her child neglect sentence. However, those convictions were thrown out on appeal in 2001. A state appeals court found that prosecutors focused too much on what Bowen should have done to prevent Carr's rampage, rather than what she did after the crimes were committed. The court also acquitted her of aiding and abetting the deaths of her son and Trooper Crooks. She was convicted of the remaining charges in 2002, and sentenced to 20 years in prison. Sentencing guidelines called for only 6–11 years, but in sentencing her, the judge said that Bowen's lies to police were so egregious that they endangered the public. This sentence also runs concurrently with her child abuse sentence, and she was released in October 2016.

Experts later expressed shock that the detectives had not handcuffed Carr's hands behind his back, but others defended the action, arguing that at the time the detectives thought they were dealing with a bereaved father, not a violent criminal. The media's handling of the situation also received sharp criticism, as in addition to the radio station's live interview, camera crews for local television stations were broadcasting live shots of the area surrounding the convenience store.

== In popular culture ==
Carr's case has been featured in multiple television series such as World's Wildest Police Videos in 1998 and Investigation Discovery's Hostage: Do or Die in 2011.
