= Paul Carr =

Paul Carr may refer to:

- Paul Carr (actor) (1934–2006), American character actor
- Paul Bradley Carr (born 1979), Las Vegas-based British writer, journalist and commentator
- Paul Carr (American football) (1931–2006), American football player
- Paul Carr (composer) (born 1961), English classical music composer
- Paul Carr (Gaelic footballer), played for Donegal
- Paul H. Carr (sailor) (1924–1944), U.S. Navy gunner's mate and Silver Star recipient
- Paul Carr (musician), English guitarist and member of the James Taylor Quartet
- Paul H. Carr (physicist) (born 1935), physicist and researcher
- Paul Carr (rugby league) (born 1967), rugby league footballer of the 1990s for Scotland, South Sydney Rabbitohs, and Sheffield Eagles
