= Eli Carr =

Soccer player (born 2001)

Personal information
- Full name: Eli Robert Carr
- Date of birth: January 19, 2001 (age 25)
- Place of birth: Fredericksburg, Virginia, United States
- Height: 1.80 m (5 ft 11 in)
- Position: Midfielder

College career
Years	Team	Apps	(Gls)
2019–2021	Longwood Lancers	16	(0)

International career^{‡}
2020	Puerto Rico U20	2	(0)
2021–	Puerto Rico	2	(0)
- ‡ National team caps and goals as of June 8, 2021

Eli Robert Carr (born January 19, 2001) is a footballer who plays as a midfielder for Puerto Rico national team. He is also a college soccer player for Longwood Lancers.

== Career ==
Carr is a former Puerto Rican youth international. He has represented under-20 team at 2020 CONCACAF U-20 Championship qualifiers.

In January 2021, Carr received maiden call-up to senior team of Puerto Rico for friendlies against Dominican Republic and Guatemala. He made his senior team debut on March 28, 2021, in a 1–1 draw against Trinidad and Tobago.

== Career statistics ==
=== International ===
As of June 8, 2021

Appearances and goals by national team and year
National team	Year	Apps	Goals
Puerto Rico	2021	2	0
Total		2	0
