= Henry Carr (disambiguation) =

Henry Carr (1941–2015) was an American track and field athlete.

Henry Carr may also refer to:

- Henry Carr (artist) (1894–1970), British landscape painter and war artist
- Henry Rawlingson Carr (1863–1945), Nigerian educator and administrator
- Henry Lascelles Carr (1844–1902), British newspaper proprietor and businessman
- Henry James Carr (1849–1929), American librarian
- Henry P. Carr (1904–1993), lawyer and politician from Philadelphia
- Sir Henry William Carr (1777–1821), British Army soldier
- Henry Wilfrid Carr (1894–1962), British consular official in Zurich, basis for the central character in Tom Stoppard's play Travesties, also caricatured in James Joyce's novel Ulysses.
- Sir Henry Carr (judge) (1958–2019), British barrister and High Court judge
- Henry Carr (priest) (1880–1963), Canadian priest

== See also ==
- Harry Carr (disambiguation)
- Harry Kerr (disambiguation)
- Henry Carr Crusaders
- Father Henry Carr Catholic Secondary School, Toronto (Etobicoke), Ontario
