= Walter Carr =

Walter Carr may refer to:

- Walter Carr (actor) (1925–1998), British actor
- Walter Carr (physician) (1862–1942), British physician and surgeon
- Walter J. Carr (1896–1970), American pilot and aircraft promoter
- Walt Carr, African-American cartoonist and illustrator

== See also ==
- Wally Carr (1954–2019), Aboriginal Australian boxer
