= Thomas Carr =

Thomas, Tom, or Tommy Carr may refer to:

== In people ==
=== Arts and entertainment ===
- Tom Carr (artist) (born 1956), Spanish-American artist
- Thomas Carr (artist) (1909–1999), Irish artist
- Tommy Carr (radio), actor on the radio show Magic Island
- Thomas Carr (director) (1907–1997), American film and television director
- Thomas Carr (publisher) (1780–1849), music publisher from the early United States

=== Politics ===
- Tom Carr (politician), City Attorney of Boulder, Colorado
- Thomas Carr (MP), British Tory MP for Chichester, 1708–1710

=== Religion ===
- Thomas Carr (archbishop of Melbourne) (1839–1917), Archbishop of Melbourne
- Thomas Carr (bishop) (1788–1859), Bishop of Bombay, 1836–1851

=== Sports ===
- Tom Carr (American football) (1942–2017), American football player
- Tom Carr (footballer) (born 1978), Australian Rules footballer
- Tommy Carr (Australian footballer) (1882–1963), Australian rules footballer
- Tommy Carr (Gaelic footballer) (born 1961), Gaelic football player for Dublin
- Tommy Carr (American football) (born 2007), American football player
- Thomas Carr (rugby league), rugby league footballer who has played in the 2010s
- Thomas Carr (sport shooter) (1905–1955), American Olympic shooter

=== Science and technology ===
- Thomas Carr (astronomer) (1917–2011), American astronomer at the University of Florida
- Thomas Carr (engineer) (1824–1874), English mechanical engineer and inventor
- Thomas Carr (paleontologist), vertebrate paleontologist
- Thomas L. Carr, American archaeologist and photographer

=== Other ===
- Thomas D. Carr (1846–1870), American thief, arsonist, murderer and self-confessed serial killer

== In other uses ==
- Thomas Carr Farmstead Site (Keeler Site RI-707), historic archaeological site in Rhode Island
- Thomas Carr College in Tarneit, Victoria, Australia
