= Helen Carr =

English journalist and literature professor

Helen Carr (9 May 1940–20 September 2025) was a British editor, journalist and emeritus professor of English and comparative literature at Goldsmiths, University of London.

Carr was one of the founders and editors of the feminist arts magazine Women's Review, which was first published in 1985 and ran for 21 monthly issues. The magazine focussed on reviews of books, but included a wide range of material, including an interview of Margaret Atwood by Emma Tennant, a review of Lubaina Himid's 1985 Thin Black Line exhibition, and a tribute to the Modernist poet Mina Loy.

Several years after Women's Review ceased publication, Carr met with the OUP editorial director, Kim Scott Walywn and agreed to reinvent the magazine as an academic journal, Women: A Cultural Review.. The first issue appeared in 1990, with Carr and Isobel Armstrong as lead editors.

Carr's book on the imagist movement was described by Ian Sansom in The Guardian as "the most comprehensive book on the subject ever written."

== Selected publications ==
- From My Guy to Sci-Fi: Genre and Women's Writing in the Postmodern World (London: Pandora Press, 1990. ISBN 978-0044404088)
- Inventing the American Primitive: Politics, Gender and the Representation of Native American Literary Traditions, 1789–1936 (New York: Cork University Press, 1996, ISBN 978-1859180983)
- The Verse Revolutionaries: Ezra Pound, H.D. and The Imagists (London: Jonathan Cape, 2009, ISBN 978-0746311639)

- Jean Rhys (Writers & Their Work) (2nd revised edition, Northcote House Publishers Ltd, 2011; ISBN 978-0746311639)
