= Francis Carr (footballer) =

Liberian footballer

Personal information
- Full name: Francis Carr
- Date of birth: 26 July 1979 (age 47)
- Place of birth: Monrovia, Liberia
- Height: 1.70 m (5 ft 7 in)
- Position: Midfielder

Senior career*
Years	Team	Apps	(Gls)
2000–2004	NPA Anchors	86	(7)
2004–2005	Persiter Ternate	26	(5)
2005–2006	PSPS Pekanbaru	22	(4)

International career
1997–2007	Liberia	4	(0)
- * Club domestic league appearances and goals

Francis Carr (born July 26, 1979) is a Liberian former footballer who played as a midfielder for PSPS Pekanbaru and the Liberia national team.
