= Ronald Carr =

South African cricketer (1938–2023)

Ronald Bernard Carr (12 January 1938 – 24 May 2023) was a South African cricketer. He was a right-handed batsman and leg-break bowler. Carr was born in Johannesburg.

Carr made two first-class appearances during his cricketing career, the first coming for Essex in the 1960 season, following two seasons of action in the Second XI, with whom he was a regular during 1959. Carr's second and final first-class appearance came four years later, playing for Transvaal in an innings defeat against the MCC.

Carr failed to take a wicket in either first-class match but scored 35 runs as a tailender.
