= Gary Carr =

Gary Carr may refer to:

- Gary Carr (politician) (born 1955), politician in Ontario, Canada
- Gary Carr (actor) (born 1986), English actor, dancer and musician
- Gary Carr (video game developer), an English video game developer
