= Gregory Carr =

Gregory Carr may refer to:

- Greg Carr (gridiron football) (born 1985), American football player
- Greg Carr (rally driver), Australian rally driver
- Gregory C. Carr (born 1959), American entrepreneur and philanthropist

== See also ==
- Gregg Carr (born 1962), American football player and surgeon
