= Rotonya M. Carr =

American hepatologist and physician-scientist

- Education: Harvard University; Weill Cornell Medicine
- Children: 2
- Scientific career
- Fields: Hepatology, gastroenterology, lipid droplet biology
- Workplaces: Hospital of the University of Pennsylvania; University of Washington

Rotonya McCants Carr is an American hepatologist and physician-scientist who studies the function of lipid metabolites and lipid droplet proteins in relation to hepatic insulin signaling. She is the Cyrus E. Rubin Chair and division head of gastroenterology at the University of Washington.

== Life ==
Carr and her brother were raised by a single mother with some support from their grandmother. She grew up in Charleston, South Carolina. She was a first-generation college student. Carr earned a B.A. and M.A. in biology, cum laude, from Harvard University in 1996. She completed a gap year in Butterworth, South Africa where she volunteered at a technical college. She completed a M.D. at Weill Cornell Medicine in 2001. At the Massachusetts General Hospital, Carr conducted an internship from 2001 to 2002 in the laboratory of endocrinologist Rexford S. Ahima and a residency from 2002 to 2004.

For four years, Carr worked as a general internist at the Ferguson Medical Center in Sikeston, Missouri. While there, she met and married Tyree. Together, they had two children. Carr completed a fellowship in gastroenterology at the Hospital of the University of Pennsylvania (HUP) from 2008 to 2011 followed by a postdoctoral fellowship from 2009 to 2013. In 2018, Carr was an assistant professor at HUP. The same year, she was a nominee for the board of the school district of Philadelphia.

Carr is a hepatologist and hepatic lipid droplet biology physician-scientist. She researches the function of lipid metabolites and lipid droplet proteins in relation to hepatic insulin signaling. She is an associate professor of medicine in the division of gastroenterology at the University of Washington. She holds the Cyrus E. Rubin endowed chair in medicine. In 2020, Carr became a founding member of the Association of Black Gastroenterologists and Hematologists. In 2021, she became a fellow of the American College of Physicians. The same year, Carr participated in public service announcements to encourage vaccinations among communities of color.
