= Attorney General Carr =

Attorney General Carr may refer to:

- Christopher M. Carr (born 1972), Attorney General of Georgia
- Waggoner Carr (1918–2004), Attorney General of Texas

== See also ==
- William Ogle Carr (1802–1856), King's Advocate of Ceylon, predecessor office to the Attorney General of Sri Lanka
- General Carr (disambiguation)
