= Donald Eaton Carr =

American journalist

Donald Eaton Carr

Donald Eaton Carr (October 17, 1903 – September 1986) was an American journalist, writer, environmentalist and research chemist.

He was born in Los Angeles, California, on October 17, 1903. He obtained a science degree from University of California, Berkeley in 1930. In 1934 he married Mildred Clarke, From 1930 until 1947 he was a research chemist at the Union Oil Company. He wrote seven books, mostly about air and water pollution.

Carr's The Eternal Return, published in 1968, was a work on the philosophy of time which advocates a theory of eternal return. Carr dismissed the idea of reincarnation and stated that everything that happens has happened an infinite number of times and will recur an infinite number of times in the future.

== Selected publications ==
- The Breath of Life (Norton, 1965)
- Death of the Sweet Waters (Norton, 1966)
- The Eternal Return (Doubleday, 1968)
- The Sexes (Doubleday, 1970)
- The Deadly Feast of Life (Doubleday, 1971)
- The Forgotten Senses (Doubleday, 1972)
- Energy and the Earth Machine (Norton, 1976)
