= Lucy Carr =

British singer and model

Lucy Carr (born 1976) is a British singer and model, known for her appearance in BBC Television's Passport to the Sun.

The first artist contracted to Lickin' Records, in 2002 she released her debut single, "Missing You", which reached number 28 in the UK Singles Chart.

In July 2003, she released her second single, "This is Goodbye". It reached number 41 in the UK Singles Chart.
