= Jonathan Carr =

Jonathan Carr may refer to:

- Jonathan Dodgson Carr, industrial baker, founder of Carr's
- Jonathan Carr (property developer) (1845–1915), London cloth merchant and property developer
- Jonathan Carr (writer) (1942–2008), British writer and journalist
- Jonathan Carr (born 1980), American murderer and perpetrator of the 2000 Wichita Massacre
  - Kansas v. Carr, 2016 U.S. Supreme Court case arising from the Wichita Massacre

== See also ==
- John Carr (disambiguation)
