= We Don't Want the Bacon (What We Want Is a Piece of the Rhine) =

1918 song written by "Kid" Howard Carr and Harry Russell and composed by Jimmie Havens

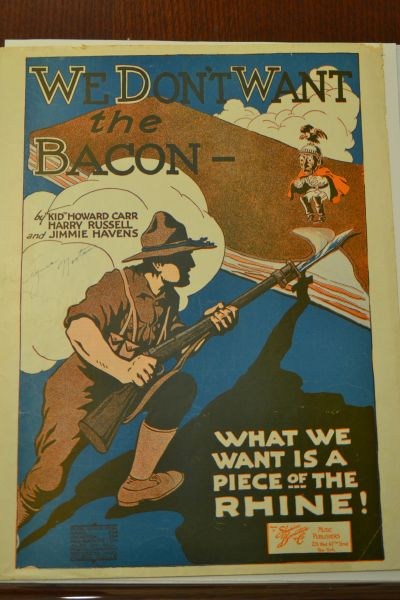
- Sheet music cover at the Pritzker Military Museum & Library

Song
- Released: 1918
- Composer: Jimmie Havens
- Lyricists: "Kid" Howard Carr; Harry Russell

"We Don't Want the Bacon (What We Want Is a Piece of the Rhine)" is a World War I–era song released in 1918. The lyrics were written by "Kid" Howard Carr and Harry Russell, and the music composed by Jimmie Havens. The song was published by Shapiro, Bernstein & Co. of New York City. On the cover is a soldier tearing through a large piece of bacon with his bayonet. A fearful-looking Kaiser Wilhelm II is standing on the bacon. It was written for voice and piano.

The song was recorded on September 9, 1918 by the Peerless Quartet. They were conducted by Josef Pasternack. Victor Records issued the song.

The song's title is influenced by the popular saying, "bring home the bacon". This phrase means to be successful, specifically financially successful. In the song, it is emphasized that Americans have thrived in holding their own against any enemy and always "brought home the bacon, no matter what". This time though, their focus is not on bacon, but getting the "Hun". It is apparent in the lyrics that the fear of Germany is downplayed. The chorus is as follows:

We don't want the bacon
We don't want the bacon,
What we want is a piece of the Rhine.
We'll crown "Bill the Kaiser" with a bottle of Budweiser
We'll have a wonderful time.
Old Wilhelm Der Gross will shout "Vas iss Los"?
When we hit that Hindenburg line FINE!;
We don't want the bacon
We don't want the bacon,
What we want is a piece of the Rhine.
