= Nicholas Carr =

Nicholas Carr or Nick Carr may refer to:

- Nicholas Carr (professor) (1524–1568), British professor
- Nicholas G. Carr (born 1959), American journalist and writer
- Nikos Karvelas (born 1951), Greek singer-songwriter and record producer, stage name Nick Carr
  - Nick Carr (album), a 1985 album

== See also ==
- Wooda Nicholas Carr (1871–1953), Democratic member of the U.S. House of Representatives from Pennsylvania
