= Iain Carr =

English cricketer

Personal information
- Full name: Iain David Carr
- Born: 25 March 1977 (age 49); Newcastle-under-Lyme, Staffordshire, England
- Batting: Right-handed
- Bowling: Right-arm fast-medium

Domestic team information
- Years: Team
- 1999–2006: Staffordshire

Career statistics
| Competition | List A |
|---|---|
| Matches | 2 |
| Runs scored | 1 |
| Batting average | 1.00 |
| 100s/50s | –/– |
| Top score | 1 |
| Balls bowled | 107 |
| Wickets | 5 |
| Bowling average | 17.00 |
| 5 wickets in innings | – |
| 10 wickets in match | – |
| Best bowling | 3/34 |
| Catches/stumpings | 2/– |
- Source: Cricinfo, 14 June 2011

Iain David Carr (born 25 March 1977) is a former English cricketer. Carr was a right-handed batsman who bowled right-arm fast-medium. He was born in Newcastle-under-Lyme, Staffordshire.

Carr made his debut for Staffordshire in the 1999 MCCA Knockout Trophy against the Leicestershire Cricket Board. Carr played Minor counties cricket for Staffordshire from 1999 to 2006, which included 9 Minor Counties Championship matches and 10 MCCA Knockout Trophy matches. In 2000, he made his List A debut against the Somerset Cricket Board in the 1st round of the NatWest Trophy. He played a further List A match against Devon in the following round. In his 2 List A matches, he took 5 wickets at an average of 17.00, with best figures of 3/34.
