= Eric Carr (boxer) =

American boxer

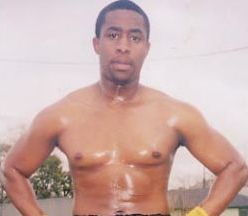

Personal information
- Born: January 26, 1975 (age 51)
- Height: Heavyweight

Boxing career

Boxing record
- Total fights: 62
- Wins: 56
- Losses: 6

Eric Carr (born January 26, 1975) is an American professional heavyweight boxer. Carr's amateur boxing career began at the age of 14. His amateur career produced a record of 56 wins with 6 losses.

Carr has sparred with boxing champions, including seven-time world middleweight champion Tommy "Hit Man" Hearns, the former WBC Continental Middleweight Champion Kid Fire Parks, and 1984 Olympics medal winner Frank Tate, the former world Middleweight Champion.

Carr credits training camp experiences with trainer Johnny Powell for his boxing skills. Powell served as co-trainer with Eddie Futch, known for his work with Michael Spinks and Leon Spinks. Carr also trained with former New York Golden Gloves and WBA Light Heavyweight champion Eddie Mustafa Muhammad, and David Parks, the architect of Lamar "Kid Fire" Parks. Carr has won bouts in New Orleans, Louisiana, and Houston. He has fought on a card produced by Fight to the Finish Productions along with Big Wheel Promotions. Carr also served on the board of the NAACP as an executive committee member, and also currently sits on the board of the YMCA.
