= William Carr =

William or Bill Carr may refer to:

== Politicians ==
- William Carr (Bristol MP) (died 1575), MP for Bristol
- William Carr (Newcastle-upon-Tyne MP, died 1572), MP for Newcastle-upon-Tyne
- William Carr (Newcastle-upon-Tyne MP, died 1720) (1664–1720), MP for Newcastle-upon-Tyne
- William Carr (Newcastle-upon-Tyne MP, died 1742), MP for Newcastle-upon-Tyne
- William Theodore Carr (1866–1931), Member of Parliament for Carlisle
- Bill Carr (politician) (1918–2000), British Conservative Party politician
- William F. Carr (1910–1998), American politician

== Sports ==
- William Carr (rower) (1876–1942), American rower
- Bill Carr (equestrian) (1901–1982), British Olympic equestrian
- Bill Carr (1909–1966), American Olympic 400m runner
- Bill Carr (American football coach) (1917–2006), American football coach
- Bill Carr (American football player) (1945–2024), American football player and college athletic director
- Bill Carr (basketball) (born c. 1965), American basketball coach
- William Carr (arena football) (born 1975), American and arena football player and assistant coach
- William Carr (cricketer) (born 1976), Australian cricketer

=== Association football ===
- William Carr (footballer, born 1848) (1848–1924), England international football goalkeeper
- William Carr (footballer, born 1901) (1901–1990), English footballer who played as a fullback
- Billy Carr (1905–1989), English football defender
- Graham Carr (William Graham Carr, born 1944), English footballer and manager
- Willie Carr (born 1950), Scottish international footballer

== Military ==
- William M. Carr (1829–1884), Medal of Honor recipient in the American Civil War
- William Louis Carr (1878–1921), American Medal of Honor recipient in the Boxer Rebellion
- William Carr (admiral) (1883–1966), Australian naval officer
- William Guy Carr (1895–1959), Canadian naval officer and author
- William Keir Carr (1923–2020), Canadian Air Force officer

== Others ==
- William Holwell Carr (1750–1830), English art dealer, art collector and painter
- Sir William Ogle Carr (1802–1856), chief justice of Ceylon
- William Broughton Carr (1837–1909), English beekeeper and author
- William Henry Carr (1855–1953), English trade unionist and political activist
- William Carr (biographer) (1862–1925), British biographer for the Dictionary of National Biography
- Sir William Emsley Carr (1867–1941), British newspaper editor
- William George Carr (1901–1996), British-born American educator and author
- William Carr (historian) (1921–1991), British historian
- Bill Carr (actor) (born 1955), Canadian actor and comedian
