= Lord Carr =

Lord Carr may refer to:

- Charles Kerr, 2nd Earl of Ancram (1624–1690), Scottish peer and English member of Parliament, known as Lord Carr before he succeeded to the earldom in 1654
- Robert Carr, Baron Carr of Hadley (1916–2012), British Conservative politician

== See also ==
- Sue Carr, Baroness Carr of Walton-on-the-Hill (born 1964), English judge and Lady Chief Justice since 2023
- Baron Ker (disambiguation)
- Lord Kerr (disambiguation)
