= Frank Carr (footballer) =

English footballer

Personal information
- Full name: Francis Joseph Carr
- Date of birth: 21 April 1919
- Place of birth: Maltby, West Riding of Yorkshire, England
- Date of death: July 2010 (aged 91)
- Place of death: North Yorkshire, England
- Height: 5 ft 8 in (1.73 m)
- Position: Inside forward

Senior career*
Years	Team	Apps	(Gls)
1941–1946	Rotherham United	0	(0)
1946–1947	York City	7	(3)
Total		7	(3)
- * Club domestic league appearances and goals

Francis Joseph Carr (21 April 1919 – July 2010) was an English professional footballer who played as an inside forward in the Football League for York City, and was on the books of Rotherham United without making a league appearance.
