= Robert Carr (disambiguation) =

Robert Carr (1916–2012) was a British Conservative politician.

Robert Carr may also refer to:

== Politicians ==
- Robert Carr (MP for Boston) (c. 1511–1590), MP for Boston 1559
- Robert Kerr, 1st Earl of Ancram or Carr (1578–1654), Scottish nobleman, politician and writer
- Robert Carr, Earl of Somerset (c. 1587–1645), Scottish politician
- Sir Robert Carr, 3rd Baronet (c. 1637–1682), British politician, privy counsellor of England, MP for Lincolnshire 1665–1685
- Robert S. Carr (1845–1925), American politician, president of the West Virginia Senate from 1889 to 1891

== Others ==
- Sir Robert Carr, Kt., English officer who secured the surrender of Fort Cassimir, New Netherland in 1664
- Robert Carr (bishop) (1774–1841), English churchman, bishop of Chichester, 1824, and bishop of Worcester, 1831
- Robert Carr (baritone) (1881–1948), English baritone singer and recording artist
- Robert Frederick Carr (1943–2007), American serial killer
- Robert K. Carr (1908–1979), American scholar in the field of government and political science
- Robert Spencer Carr (1909–1994), American writer
- Robert Carr (programmer) (born 1956), American computer programmer
- Robert Carr (activist) (1963–2011), Trinidadian scholar and human rights activist
- Robert Carr (rugby union) (1917–1979), British Army officer and England international rugby union player

== See also ==
- Bob Carr (disambiguation)
- Robert Kerr (disambiguation)
