= Chris Carr =

Chris Carr or Christopher Carr may refer to:

- Chris Carr (Medal of Honor) (1914–1970), American soldier and Medal of Honor recipient
- Chris Carr (motorcyclist) (born 1967), American motorcycle racer, land speed record holder
- Chris Carr (basketball) (born 1974), American basketball player
- Chris Carr (American football) (born 1983), American football player
- Chris Carr (politician), American politician serving as Attorney General of Georgia
