= Linda Carr =

American pop-soul singer

- Occupation: pop-soul singer

Linda Carr is an American pop-soul singer.

Before going solo, Carr was a backing singer for James Brown, replacing Tammi Terrell. She and her band, The Love Squad, had a UK Top 20 1975 hit, released on 12 July and peaking at Number 15 on 16 August in the UK with a song called "Highwire". She released a follow-up single called "Cherry Pie Guy" but it failed to chart.
