= Charles Telford Carr =

British academic (1905–1976)

Charles Telford Carr (5 February 1905, Manchester – 10 March 1976, St Andrews) was a British academic, specialising in German, noted for his foundational work on nominal compounds in Germanic languages.

== Life ==
Carr's parents were James, a solicitor's clerk, and Selena (née Mclean).

After studying at Manchester Grammar School, Carr took a first class honours BA degree in modern languages at the Victoria University of Manchester in 1921–24, also studying at Zurich University in 1924–25 and Vienna in 1925, and gaining a Manchester MA in 1926 with the thesis 'Die altsächsischen Nominal-komposita'. He served as assistant lecturer in German at Birkbeck, University of London in 1925–26 and then in 1926–29 as lecturer in German at the University of Manchester. He became Lecturer and/or Reader in German Language and Literature and Teutonic Philology in the University of St Andrews's United College in 1929.

Alongside his university teaching, Carr taught Literature and German in Dundee via the Workers' Educational Association in the 1930s (though with an apparently acrimonious dispute over the fees, class-sizes, and entry requirements in 1939).

In 1939, Carr took a D.Litt. degree at the University of St Andrews for his thesis 'Nominal Compounds in Germanic', his best known work, characterised by John L. Flood as 'a major book'. From 1939 to 1945 he worked for the Royal Navy in the wartime codebreaking operation at Bletchley Park.

In 1948, Carr was promoted to become St Andrews's first Professor of German, a position he held until his retirement in 1973. He was also 'appointed General Editor of a three-volume Oxford History of the German Language, of which, however, only W. B. Lockwood's study of historical syntax (1968) and Charles Russ's volume on phonology and morphology (1978) appeared'. In 1955–60 he served as Dean of the Faculty of Arts and in 1968–72 as Master of United College.

In 1929 Carr married Marian Frances Hilton Roscoe, who died in 1948, and in 1952 Jean Margaret Berneaud, who died in 1998. He was a member of the Royal and Ancient Golf Club.

== Publications ==
An extensive list of publications is provided by Peter Branscombe.
