= Bob Carr (disambiguation) =

Bob Carr (born 1947) is a former premier of New South Wales, Australia.

Bob Carr may also refer to:

== People ==
- Bob Carr (archaeologist) (born 1947), American archaeologist
- Bob Carr (Florida politician) (1899–1967), American mayor of Orlando, Florida
- Bob Carr (Michigan politician) (1943–2024), U.S. representative from the state of Michigan

== Others ==
- Bob Carr Theater, auditorium located in Orlando, Florida, U.S.

== See also ==
- Robert Carr (disambiguation)
