= Charles Carr (cricketer) =

Australian cricketer

Personal information
- Full name: Charles Seymour Carr
- Born: 22 November 1849; Jamaica
- Died: 30 March 1921 (aged 71); Melbourne, Australia

Domestic team information
- Years: Team
- 1872/73: Victoria
- Only First-class: 28 February 1873 Victoria v New South Wales

Career statistics
Competition	FC
Matches	1
Runs scored	0
Batting average	0.00
100s/50s	0/0
Top score	0
Balls bowled	0
Wickets	–
Bowling average	–
5 wickets in innings	–
10 wickets in match	–
Best bowling	–
Catches/stumpings	0/–
- Source: Cricinfo, 6 June 2015

Charles Seymour Carr (22 November 1849 – 30 March 1921) was an Australian cricketer. He played one first-class cricket match for Victoria in 1873.

== See also ==
- List of Victoria first-class cricketers
