= Andrew Carr Sr. House =

Historic house in North Dakota, United States

- U.S. National Register of Historic Places
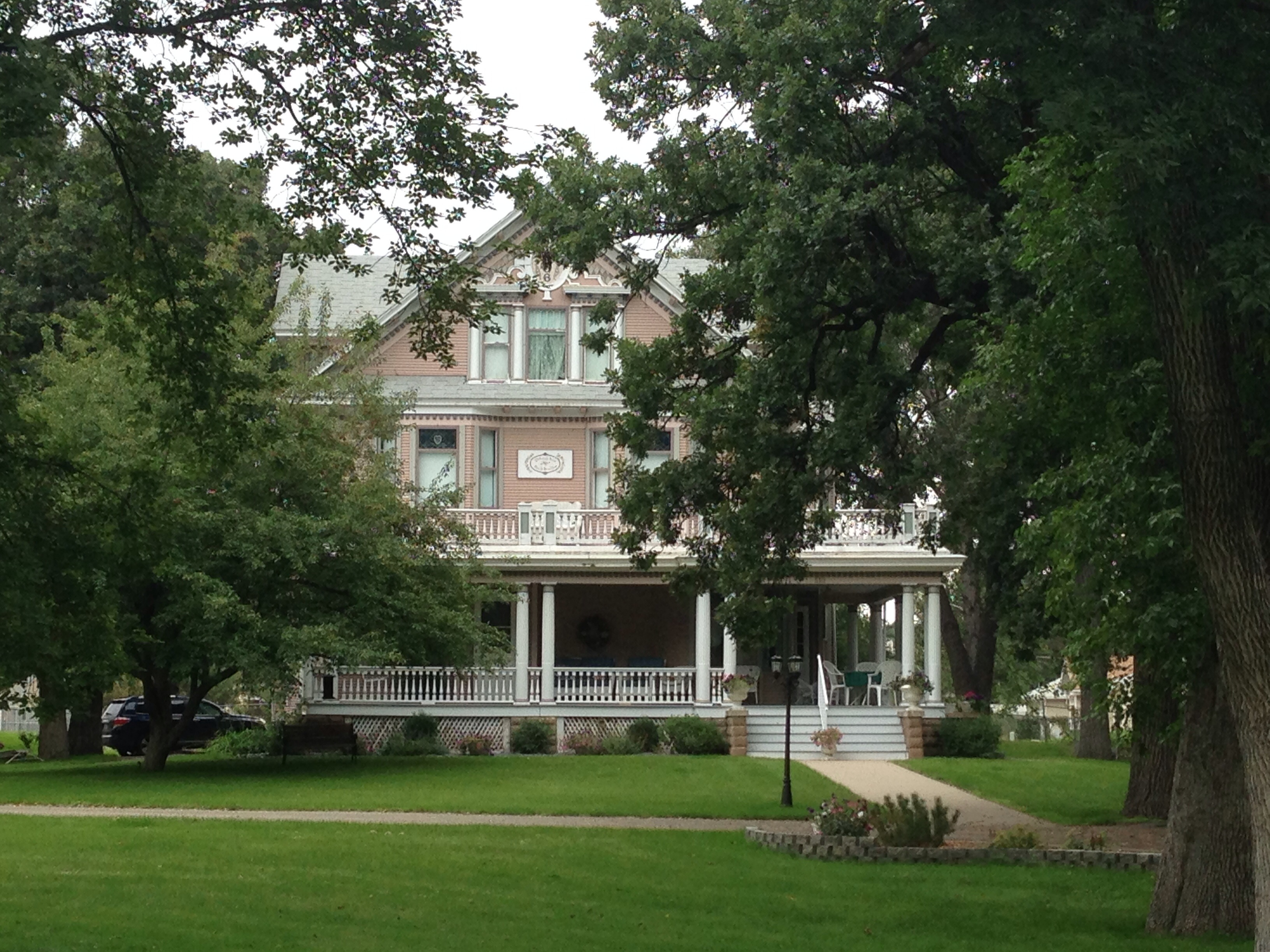

- Location within North Dakota Location within the United States
- Location: 510 4th Ave., NW, Minot, North Dakota
- Coordinates: 48°14′25″N 101°18′6″W
- Area: 1.5 acres (0.61 ha)
- Built: 1903
- Architect: Zimmerman, William
- Architectural style: Classical Revival
- NRHP reference No.: 84002771
- Added to NRHP: April 26, 1984

The Andrew Carr Sr. House on 4th Ave., NW, in Minot, North Dakota was designed by William Zimmerman in Classical Revival architecture. It was listed on the National Register of Historic Places in 1984. The listing included two contributing buildings.

According to its NRHP nomination, one reason the house is historically significant is that it is "one of a few well-preserved examples of massive architect-designed homes built by affluent North Dakotans at the turn of the century."

The house was built as a residence for Dr. Andrew Carr Sr. (1854–1948) and Addie McIntyre Carr (1862-1940). The Carr family home started to be built in 1903 and was finished and moved into in 1906. The former residence is now the site of the Dakotah Rose Bed and Breakfast.
