= Ray Carr =

Australian rules footballer

Personal information
- Full name: Ray Carr
- Born: 2 December 1948 (age 77)
- Original team: Ormond Amateurs
- Height: 180 cm (5 ft 11 in)
- Weight: 84 kg (185 lb)

Playing career^{1}
Years	Club	Games (Goals)
1970–72	Melbourne	25 (55)
- ^{1} Playing statistics correct to the end of 1972.

Ray Carr (born 2 December 1948) is a former Australian rules footballer who played with Melbourne in the Victorian Football League (VFL).

In 1972 he left Melbourne for Oakleigh in the VFA, he played in Oakleigh's premiership team that year. He became only the second player to receive Brownlow votes and J.J. Liston votes in the same year. He left Oakleigh at the end of 1973 because he wanted to play full forward.

In 1974 he joined Oakleigh Districts in the Federal Football League and he won the league goalkicking award every year from 1974 to 1981. His first one hundred games for the Districts yielded him 597 goals.
