= Fern G. Z. Carr =

Canadian poet

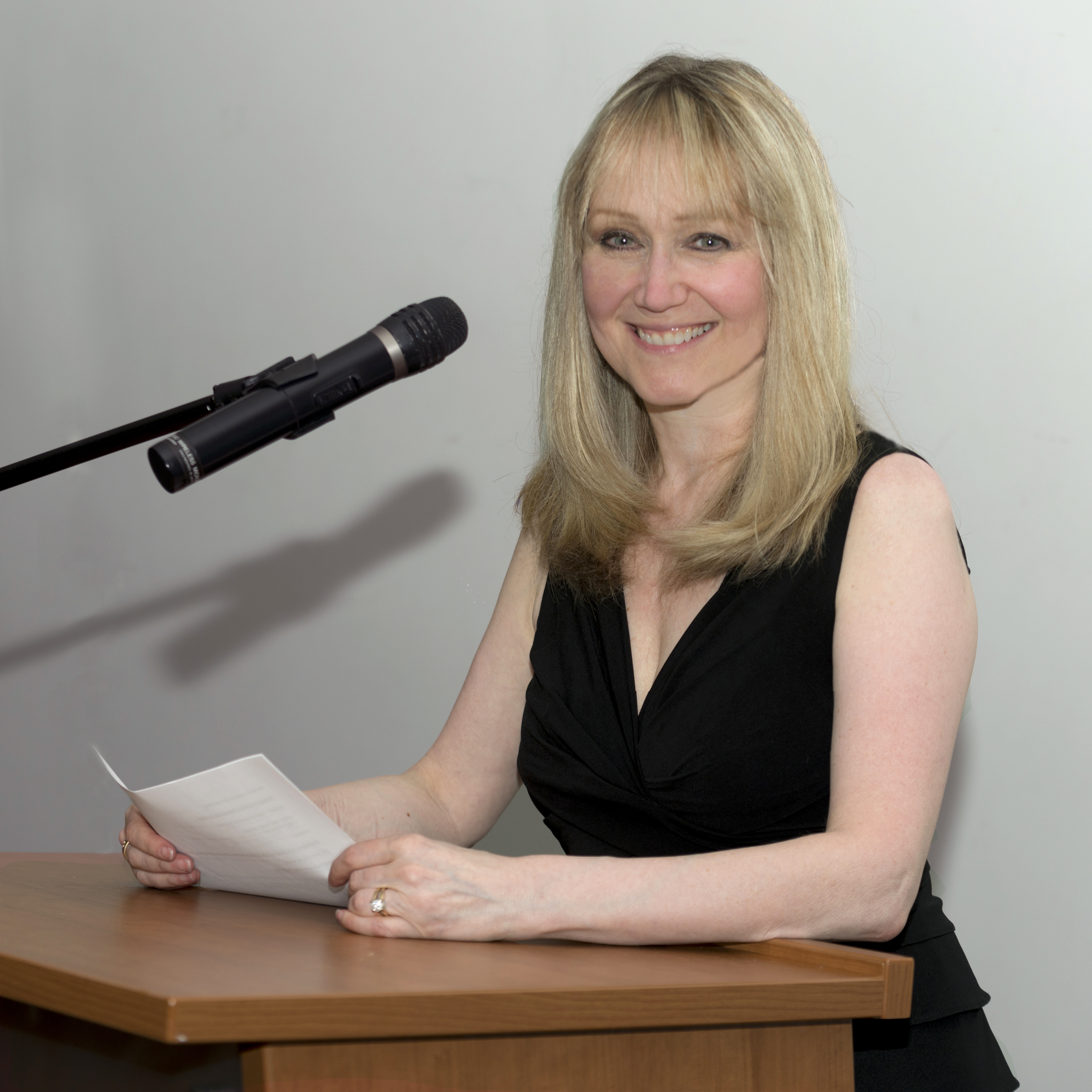
- Born: 1956 (age 69–70); Winnipeg, Manitoba, Canada
- Education: University of Manitoba; Collège Universitaire de Saint-Boniface
- Occupations: Poet, writer, translator, teacher, lawyer
- Writing career
- Language: English, French, Spanish, Yiddish, Italian, Mandarin
- Period: 1978–present
- Genre: Poetry
- Notable works: Shards of Crystal; I Am
- Notable awards: Going to Mars with MAVEN; Poem of the Month for Canada
- Website: ferngzcarr.com

Fern G. Z. Carr is a contemporary Canadian poet and writer who resides in Kelowna, British Columbia. A former League of Canadian Poets' Poet-in-Residence mentoring young writers, Fern G. Z. Carr is the author of Shards of Crystal (Silver Bow Publishing, 2018). She is a former lawyer, teacher, and past president of both the Kelowna branch of the BC Society for Prevention of Cruelty to Animals (SPCA) and Project Literacy Central Okanagan Society. Carr composes and translates poetry in six languages, including Mandarin.

Published over seven hundred times worldwide, Fern G. Z. Carr also curates her own YouTube Channel. Her channel includes poetry, writing, language, and teaching resources.

One of Carr's poems is currently orbiting the planet Mars aboard NASA's MAVEN spacecraft.

== Personal Life and Education ==
Fern G. Z. Carr was born in 1956 in Winnipeg, Manitoba. Carr attended the University of Manitoba where she obtained her Bachelor of Arts degree (BA) and her Bachelor of Laws degree (LLB). She received her Call to the Bar from the Law Society of Manitoba. After briefly practising law, Carr decided to pursue her interest in languages. She enrolled at le Collège Universitaire de Saint-Boniface where she received her Certificat en Éducation and was the recipient of the Manitoba Government Book Prize for highest standing in her program. She subsequently taught French Immersion before moving to Kelowna with her family in 1999. She is married and is the sister-in-law of the late Jim Carr, former Member of Parliament and cabinet minister. She is also the aunt of Ben Carr, Member of Parliament for Winnipeg South Centre.

== Writing Style and Influences ==
Carr's early poetry from the late 1970s to the mid-1990s is more representative of traditional meter and rhyme. She subsequently began to experiment with different forms and styles while continuing to compose traditional poetry in set forms such as pantoum and ghazal. An admirer of Emily Dickinson, Carr liked the use of em dashes and often incorporated them into her poems. In the 2000s, Carr's poetry style became more eclectic as she experimented with design. This was particularly evident in her visual and concrete poetry as well as in her experimental math / science poems such as "The Fickle Nature of the Parabola" and "Holocaust Genealogy". To date, her stylistic focus is free verse.

While Carr's poetry primarily is written in English, she also composes poems in French, Spanish, Italian, Yiddish and the Chinese Mandarin dialect. Even though she occasionally translates the works of other poets, she tends to focus on bilingual and trilingual side-by-side translations of her own poetry.

Many of Carr's poems were influenced by her early years in Winnipeg's West End where she bore witness to poverty and crime. While this darkness is evident in some of her poetry, she also composes poems which evoke a diverse array of human emotions.

== Shards of Crystal ==
Shards of Crystal reflects a dichotomy and as such, is described as a metamorphosis of darkness to light. Dealing with issues such as suicide, trauma, dementia, cruelty to animals, and the death of a child, the book then gradually changes course. It begins its transformative move towards the beauty of life with poems about musicality, spiritual liberation and the philosophy of existence. It culminates in a philosophical examination of mankind's place in the universe with Carr's signature poem, "I Am".

The imagery in Shards of Crystal parallels the darkness-to-light chronology of Carr's poems. This transition is essentially a redemptive move both literally and metaphorically, reconciling the pain of "Shards" at the outset of the book with the beauty and enlightenment of "Crystal" at the conclusion. Beginning with the darkness of night and becoming progressively lighter, her poems ultimately achieve the illumination of the eternal. This is in keeping with the overarching theme of hope as expressed by the Victor Hugo quote at the start of the book: "Even the darkest night will end and the sun will rise."

== Publications ==
Carr has been published extensively worldwide in Australia, Austria, Canada, China, Cyprus, England, Finland, France, Germany, India, Ireland, Israel, Italy, Japan, Malawi, Mauritius, Mayotte Island, Mexico, Morocco, Nepal, Netherlands, New Zealand, Nigeria, Peru, Philippines, Romania, Scotland, Seychelles, Singapore, South Africa, Spain, Sweden, Thailand, United Arab Emirates, USA and Wales.

The following is a representative sampling of books, online publications, anthologies, journals, and literary nonfiction venues in which Carr's work has appeared:

=== Books ===
- Shards of Crystal (Silver Bow Publishing, 2018) ISBN 978-1-927616-96-3

=== Selected Online Publications ===
- Skipjack Review - 2024
- Plum Tree Tavern - 2022
- League of Canadian Poets Poetry Pause - 2020
- The Literary Nest - 2019
- Antarctica Journal - 2018
- The Ekphrastic Review - 2015

=== Selected Anthologies ===
- Arcana Poetry Press - Smitten with the Written - 2026
- World Poetry Yearbook - 2024
- Dribbles, Drabbles, and Postcards - 2022
- Shield of Wisdom - 2021
- Lost and Found - 2019
- Celestial Musings - 2018
- Nuclear Impact: Broken Atoms in Our Hands - 2017
- Childhood Regained - 2016
- Contemporary Poetry - An Anthology of Present Day Best Poems Vol. 2 - 2015
- Storm Cycle 2013 - The Best of Kind of a Hurricane Press - 2014
- The Body Electric - 2013
- Sol: English Writing in Mexico - 2012
- Butterfly Away - 2011
- Van Gogh's Ear 7 - 2010

=== Selected Journals ===
- table//FEAST - 2025
- Moss Piglet Art and Literary Journal - November 2024
- The Font Vol. 1 - 2023
- The Laurel Review 51.2 - 2018
- The London Reader - Autumn 2017
- The Café Review 27 - Winter 2016
- Slant - Summer, 2015
- Whole Terrain 21 - 2014
- Legal Studies Forum XXXVII, No. 1 - 2013
- The Toronto Quarterly 8 - Nov. 2011
- White Wall Review 135 - 2011
- Prairie Fire 31, No. 3 - Fall 2010
- Poetry New Zealand 41 - September 2010

=== Literary Nonfiction ===
- PostScript Magazine - 2023
- Federation of BC Writers WordWorks Magazine - 2022 & 2020
- Part of the Discourse: An Interdisciplinary Humanities Journal - 2019

== Selected Awards and Honours ==
- Haiku included on the Going to Mars Contest DVD aboard NASA's MAVEN spacecraft which is currently orbiting the planet Mars
- One of five Canadian poets included in World Poetry Yearbook 2024 with "copies presented to the UN Library, UNESCO, Nobel Prize Committee,"..."libraries of famous universities, major literary newspapers or periodicals and outstanding literary research specialists all over the world."
- 2013 Pushcart Prize Nominee - The Worcester Review
- A winner of Il Premio Nazionale di Letteratura "Il Meleteo di Guido Gozzano" 4° Edizione (Sezione Autori di Lingua Straniera)
- Poem, "I Am", selected by the Parliamentary Poet Laureate of Canada as Poem of the Month for Canada, May 2010
- Biographical listing in The World's Lawyer Poets
- Biographical listing in ABC Bookworld, a reference site for BC literature and authors
- Featured online in The Globe and Mail
- Poetry air-dropped in Cyprus in conjunction with Spring Poetry Rain
- Featured poet ("Lumière sur") Sipay Revue Littéraire Seychelloise Numéro 12
- Former League of Canadian Poets' Poet in Residence mentoring young writers
- Invited to do readings of her Mandarin poetry for Chinese New Year 2020, Spring Lantern Festival 2020 and 2024
- Featured solo guest presenter at the Rotary Centre for the Arts Mary Irwin Theatre in conjunction with Culture Days and the Kelowna Arts and Culture Festival 2019
- Volunteer spotlight for her work in the promotion of literacy
- A winner of the Great Canadian Haiku Contest with Carr's poems set to music and performed by Juno Award-nominated musician Royal Wood
- Shards of Crystal selected as Poetry Super Highway Bookstore Poets of the Week Featured Book
- One of three Canadian adjudicators for the Manitoba Writers' Guild Lansdowne Prize for Poetry / Prix Lansdowne de poésie (formerly Aqua Books Lansdowne Prize for Poetry)
- Western Canadian Judge - Ford & Jaguar Automotive Journalist of the Year Awards (for two consecutive years)
- Winner of multiple contests and awards

== Interviews and Articles ==
Whole Terrain, the environmental literary journal of Antioch University (Keene, NH, USA) featured an author profile with Carr. The poet was questioned as to her reflective environmental practices and how they related to her poetry.

Bill Arnott, the curator of Artist Showcase, conducted a lighthearted interview with Fern G. Z. Carr which was also subsequently featured in The Miramichi Reader.

Thomas Whyte curates a series of interviews with poets entitled poetry mini interviews. Fern G. Z. Carr was chosen to be one of these featured poets. She was the subject of a series of six weekly interviews to discuss her thoughts about poetry and her work.

Kelowna Now - In Focus did an extensive feature interview about Carr's life, writing career and achievements.

CBC Radio One (Canadian Broadcasting Corporation) host Sarah Penton invited Carr to do a special guest segment on her Radio West show.

University of Winnipeg - P.I. New Poetry on CKUW 95.9 FM.

Poet, Marissa Bell Toffoli, interviewed Fern G. Z. Carr on Words with Writers W³ Sidecar. She interviewed Carr about her poetry writing and revision practices.

Ryerson University's (Toronto ON, Canada) online newspaper, The Eye Opener, published an article entitled "Beyond the White Wall." It included references to Carr's multiple contributions to their journal, The White Wall Review.

Subsequent to Carr having been included in a database project in conjunction with research conducted by West Virginia University law professor, Dr. James R. Elkins, The Globe and Mail featured Fern G. Z. Carr in their online arts section.
