= Gerald Carr =

Gerald Carr may refer to:

- Gerald Carr (American football) (born 1959), American football player and coach
- Gerald Carr (astronaut) (1932–2020), American astronaut
- Gerald Carr (cartoonist) (born 1944), Australian cartoonist
- Gerald Carr (field hockey) (born 1938), British Olympic hockey player

== See also ==
- Gerry Carr (disambiguation)
