= Edwin Carr =

Edwin Carr may refer to:

- Edwin Carr (composer) (1926–2003), New Zealand composer of classical music
- Edwin Carr (athlete) (1928–2018), Australian athlete
- Slip Carr (Edwin William Carr, 1899–1971), his father, Australian rugby union player and Olympic sprinter
