= David & Carr =

US musical group

- Origin: Minnesota, United States
- Genres: Trance
- Years active: 2006–present
- Labels: Alter Ego Records, Black Hole Recordings
- Members: David "Wes" Johnson; Peter "Petrogad" Carr
- Website: www.davidandcarr.com

David & Carr is a duo consisting of trance musicians Peter "Petrogad" Carr and David "Wes" Johnson. Born and raised in Minnesota, Peter "Petrogad" Carr began listening to electronic music at the age of 16. Soon after, he decided to delve deeper into the world of trance, quickly becoming familiar with mainstream DJs. He attended his first event later that same year, and he was hooked. Before long, Carr was the proud owner of two new CDJ's and a beat-up mixer, playing non-stop until finally, he made the plunge to vinyl. Beginning with house parties, Carr's skill quickly spread, both on his college campus and on the airwaves as a regular on internet radio stations such as ETN.fm, progressing from his campus to gigs around the town of Duluth. Petrogad teamed up with David "Wes" Johnson in the Fall of 2006 to start what would be known as David & Carr.

David "Wes" Johnson came onto the dance scene just as epic trance swept the world at the beginning of a new millennium, with his style of hard trance becoming noticed. David's early work was quickly signed to many early-known trance labels, including Moonshine Records and Flashtraxx. As his music progressed, he refined his production talent, becoming known as an anthem trance producer. Despite his production skill and musical talent, David was very familiar with DJing. Starting at the age of ten, he always had a passion for the music and quickly becoming one with the turntables. David has hosted hundreds of radio shows across the country and around the world.

In June, 2007 Mr. Sam and Black Hole Recordings released "Opus", which includes Everyday by David & Carr feat. Jenna Colaizy.

In 2008 David & Carr released The Sessions Selections (Mixed by David & Carr), their first mix album, exclusively featuring tracks from Alter Ego Records. This release is a massive 40-track two-hour trance and progressive journey

== Live performances ==
David & Carr opened for Tiësto at Myth in Minnesota on August 22, 2007. David & Carr have played southern dance in Arkansas and Unlimited Friday Party at LVC in Leiden, The Netherlands. They also performed for many live radio broadcast, including ETN.fm, Sirius Satellite Radio, and DI.fm. David & Carr host Sounds of Tomorrow on the ETN.fm Trance Channel at 12:00 (-5 GMT) on the 3rd Tuesday of each month.

== Discography ==
=== Original productions ===
Title	Label
David & Carr feat Jenna Colaizy - Everyday (Original Mix)	Alter Ego Pure
David & Carr Lost In London	Alter Ego
David & Carr Cypress	MPFS White
David & Carr Remember	TBA

=== Remix productions ===
Title	Label
Whitenite - Aura (David and Carr Electric Remix)	Navigation
John Huijbers - The Day Before (David & Carr Tech Remix)	Alter Ego Progressive
Karl G - Crossfire (David & Carr Tech Remix)	Amplified
Matt Zo - Faint of Heart (David & Carr Remix)	Smuth Music
Noah Neiman - You're The One (David & Carr Remix)	Fiberline Audio
Marc Marberg - Guarana (David & Carr Remix)	White Label
Amex & Steve Allan - Kormerna (in production)	Alter Ego Pure
Abbott & Chambers - Where Are You (David and Carr Remix)	Alter Ego Records

=== Compilations ===
Title	Label
Mr. Sam Opus	Black Hole Recordings
David & Carr The Session Selections	Alter Ego Records
Abbott & Chambers Alter Ego Sessions Vol 2	Alter Ego Records
