= Arthur Carr =

Arthur Carr may refer to:

- Arthur Carr, author of the volume on the Gospel of Matthew in the Cambridge Bible for Schools and Colleges series
- Arthur Comyns Carr (1882–1965), British Liberal politician and lawyer
- Arthur Carr (cricketer) (1893–1963), English cricketer
- Arthur Carr (equestrian) (1910–1986), British equestrian
- Arthur Wesley Carr (1941–2017), Anglican divine, Dean of Westminster, 1997–2006
