= Justice Carr =

Justice Carr may refer to:

- Dabney Carr (1773–1837), associate justice of the Virginia Supreme Court from 1824 to 1837
- Leland W. Carr (1883–1969), associate justice of the Michigan Supreme Court from 1945 to 1963

== See also ==
- Judge Carr (disambiguation)
