= Joe Carr (English footballer) =

English footballer

Personal information
- Full name: Joseph Carr
- Date of birth: Q1 1919
- Place of birth: Sheffield, England
- Date of death: 31 May 1940 (aged 21)
- Place of death: Dunkirk, France
- Height: 5 ft 9 1/2 in (1.77 m)
- Position: Full back

Senior career*
Years	Team	Apps	(Gls)
1937–1940	Sheffield United	30	(0)
- * Club domestic league appearances and goals

Joseph Carr (Q1 1919 – 31 May 1940) was an English professional footballer who played as a full back in the Football League for Sheffield United.

== Personal life ==
On 16 October 1939, a month and a half after the outbreak of the Second World War, Carr attested in the British Army under the Militia Act. Serving as a gunner in the Royal Artillery, he was killed during the Battle of Dunkirk on 31 May 1940. He is buried at the Oostduinkerke War Cemetery.

== Career statistics ==
Appearances and goals by club, season and competition
Club	Season	League			FA Cup		Total	
Club	Season	Division	Apps	Goals	Apps	Goals	Apps	Goals
Sheffield United	1937–38	Second Division	2	0	0	0	2	0
Sheffield United	1938–39	Second Division	24	0	4	0	26	0
Sheffield United	1939–40	First Division	3	0	0	0	3	0
Career total			29	0	4	0	33	0
