= Reginald Carr =

Reginald Carr or Reg Carr may refer to:

- Reg Carr (footballer) (1934–2011), Australian rules footballer
- Reginald Carr (librarian) (born 1946), former Bodley's Librarian at the University of Oxford
- Reginald Carr (born 1977), American murderer and perpetrator of the 2000 Wichita Massacre
  - Kansas v. Carr, 2016 U.S. Supreme Court case arising from the Wichita Massacre
