= Harriet Carr =

18th- and 19th-century British artist

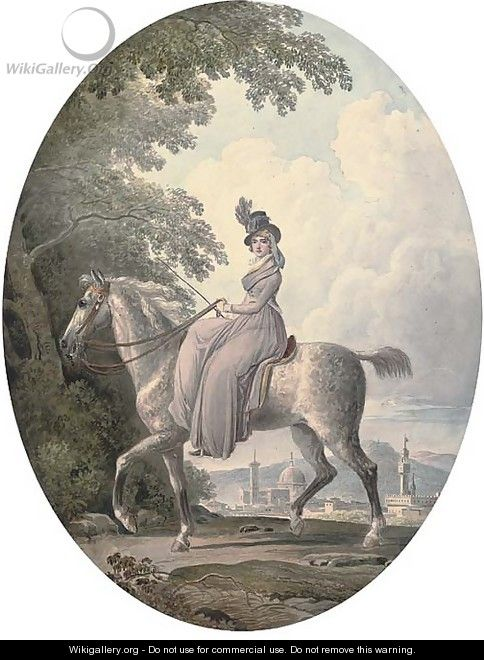
- Portrait of the Artist, Miss Harriet Carr, on Horseback in the Boboli Gardens, Florence by Jean-Baptiste Thian 1794
- Born: September 1771; Durham
- Died: 5 August 1848 (aged 76)
- Notable work: Portrait of Anne Seymour Damer in the National Galleries of Scotland
- Spouse(s): Colonel Robert Cheney, later Lieutenant-General Robert Cheney of Badger Hall, Shropshire.
- Parent(s): Isabella Byrne and Ralph Carr
- Family: Children: Robert Henry (1799–1867), Frederica (1801–1878), Edward (1803–1867), Harriet Margaret (1806–1852) and Ralph (1811–1869)
- Memorials: Neo-classical monument by John Gibson RA at Badger

Harriet Carr (September 1771 – 5 August 1848), also known by her married name Harriet Cheney, was a British artist in the late 18th century until her death. She was noted for her watercolours of landscapes and also gained recognition as a portrait painter.

== Early life ==
Harriet Carr was born in Durham in September 1771. Her parents were Isabella Byrne and Ralph Carr who was a merchant and banker. She was the youngest of five children. They lived at Dunston Hill Hall on the outskirts of Gateshead.

The Carr family were a rich family and as well as being landowners, Ralph Carr had built up various interests including ship-owning, underwriting, banking, coal mining and imports and exports of goods to Europe and America. It has been noted that the Carr properties and wealth had given the Carrs 'a claim to gentry as well as merchant status'. Little is recorded of family life though it is noted that her father commented about her as 'one of my richest jewels'.

There is no evidence of her early art education but it has been stated that she received lessons from John 'Warwick' Smith, a British watercolour landscape artist, 'before her marriage'. The picture of the sculptor Anne Seymour Damer was painted by Harriet Carr in 1788 when she was in her teens. The painting is in the collection of The National Galleries of Scotland.

== Grand Tour, 1791–94 ==
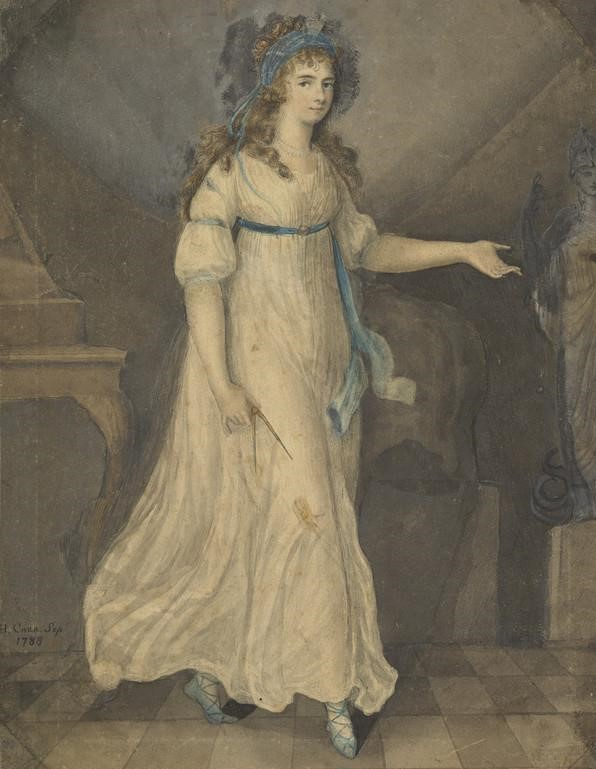
Anne Seymour Damer by Harriet Carr in 1788

In September 1791 her eldest brother, John, took her to Italy. It was hoped that the change of climate would cure her cough, which was suspected as being tubercular. En route to Italy they had to stop in Geneva for a few weeks as Harriet developed a bilious complaint. During her convalescence she spent time drawing. The Carrs arrived in Rome in December 1791 and stayed for almost six months. They had planned to return in the spring of 1792 but France and Austria went to war in April 1792 and Britain joined the war against France the next year. They eventually made it back to England in the summer of 1794 by a circuitous route. John and Harriet Carr were one of the last of the Grand Tourists in the 18th century manner.

John and Harriet gained entry to Roman society through Thomas Jenkins who had received letters from Sir John Dick who had been British consul at Leghorn. This enabled Harriet to meet many people and it is noted that her status as an artist attracted some attention. It was noted that some ladies from society visited to view her paintings and this enhanced her social status. Her riding attracted attention and it was noted in the letters home that Harriet's riding was 'the admiration of all the Roman ladies who never venture out of their carriage.' Harriet was pictured riding in a painting by Jean-Baptiste Thian: Portrait of the Artist, Miss Harriet Carr, on Horseback in the Boboli Gardens, Florence' 1794.

While in Italy Harriet developed her art skills. It has been suggested that Harriet received lessons in watercolour painting from John "Warwick" Smith and that while in Italy this had enhanced her skills in portrait and landscape painting. Some doubt has been placed on this in a recent book, Art Treasures in the North, Northern Families on the Grand Tour by Anne French, where it was noted ".....there is no evidence to support their association". The same source does mention that in 1793 Harriet received four lessons in perspective from a Jacobin artist who had fled to Florence. Despite the uncertainty about her tutors, her skill was commented upon when she returned to England – she is mentioned in The Diary of Joseph Farington.

During her stays in Florence and Rome she was involved in artistic activity. Apart from copying Old Masters in galleries she also produced landscape paintings and some large scale portraits. She acquired a reputation for portraits and in Florence her style changed and reflected her interest in antiquity. She painted British visitors to Florence and Emma, Lady Hamilton in 1792 as well as Georgina, Duchess of Devonshire in 1793. Much of the information about her paintings came from letters but in October 2005 an album of portraits produced in 1791–94 went on sale at Christie's South Kensington. The estimate for the sale of the 43 portrait studies in the album was £3,000 to £5,000 and the price realised was £16,800

A modern author noted that the Carrs 'must be numbered among the élite of tourists who had strong intellectual and cultural interests together with a genuine desire to gain experience of foreign societies'.

== Married life ==
After Harriet's return from Italy in the summer of 1794. Her mother was concerned that she might find life in the North dull. However Harriet noted that she would 'sit down contented for the remainder of my life and be thankful for having had an occasion for improvement and entertainment, that has been the lot of very few'. Harriet married Colonel Robert Cheney in 1799. He later became Lieutenant-General Robert Cheney of Badger Hall, Shropshire. The Cheney family came from Langley Hall in Kirk Langley, Derbyshire. The Cheney London residence was at 4 Audley Square, Mayfair.

The Cheneys had five children: Robert Henry (1799–1867), Frederica (1801–1878), Edward (1803–1867), Harriet Margaret (1806–1852) and Ralph (1811–1869). The Cheneys were a cultured family, more interested in collecting and practising art than in fox-hunting and shooting. Their artistic talent was fostered by Harriet Cheney. Harriet continued painting and her known works include portraits, landscapes, flower studies and classical illustrations. Joseph Farrington noted in 1804 that she was 'much attached to painting'. She also added embellishments to the decor of Badger Hall.

Lieutenant-General Robert Cheney died in 1820. After her husband's death Harriet spent some time at Badger Hall but spent most of her time in Italy.

== Life in Italy ==
After her husband's death Harriet spent most of her time in Italy. Along with her son, Robert Henry, she lived in the Palazzo Sciarra on the Corsa in Rome where she established herself in Anglo-Italian society. They had visited Naples in 1823 and then settled in Rome. She lived the life of an expatriate with her family and moved in intellectual and artistic circles. As well as her son Robert Henry, her daughter Harriet spent time with her as well as Edward who joined her in around 1825. Both Robert Henry and Edward were talented artists and their work, along with their mother's, featured in the Christies sale in London in 2005.

After Harriet sought an introduction in 1827 to the Durham born artist, William Berwick, he wrote that Harriet's drawings were 'quite exquisite. She is a true artist and is drawing and painting every day of her life'. He also noted that she 'lived in a high state here with her family'.

Harriet died in 1848 and was buried at Badger. She and her younger daughter Harriet have neo-classical monuments in Badger church by John Gibson RA.
