= Graeme Carr =

English footballer

Personal information
- Date of birth: 28 October 1978 (age 48)
- Place of birth: Chester-le-Street, England
- Position: Defender

Senior career*
Years	Team	Apps	(Gls)
1997–2000	Scarborough	11	(0)
2000–2001	Workington	?	(?)
- * Club domestic league appearances and goals

Graeme Carr (born 28 October 1978) is an English former professional footballer. He played eleven matches for Scarborough in the Football League Third Division in the 1998–99 season.
