= Anthony Carr (psychic) =

Canadian psychic (born 1943)

Anthony Carr (born 6 December 1943) is a Canadian psychic. He was once referred to by Jacqueline Stallone as the "World's Most Documented Psychic".

== About ==
He became most notable for allegedly predicting the September 11 attacks when, in December 2000, he said that he foresees a "cataclysmic cosmic event" the following year and to "Watch for a sign in the heavens. It will shock the whole world," and will "put the fear of God in us." He has been claimed to have predicted several other events. However, he has received criticism for many of his predictions not coming true.

Carr was quoted in a 2017 interview in The Spectrum saying that, "10% of my predictions are 100% accurate."
