= Benita Carr =

American photographer

- Education: Georgia State University
- Known for: Photography
- Website: Whitespace Gallery

Benita Carr is an American photographer. Born in San Antonio, Texas, she has lived and worked in Atlanta, Georgia, since 1989. Her work examines the social, psychological, and physical conditions of being female.

== Education ==
Carr holds a BBA in Marketing from the University of Texas at Austin. After working for several years as the Public Relations Director for the Atlanta Arts Festival, she earned an MFA in Photography in 1994 from Georgia State University.

== Work ==
Carr's MFA thesis work, entitled the "Purple Heart" series, caused controversy when it was displayed in an off-campus gallery space located in the Hurt Building in downtown Atlanta. Carr's photographs, which showed female bodies overlaid with medieval armor, were forcibly removed by building management over tenants' complaints about its perceived sadomasochistic content. Local artists organized a protest in response, nonetheless Carr's thesis show was only on view for a total of two hours. Carr's "Purple Heart" series was subsequently shown at the Gallery of the Arts Exchange in Atlanta.

In her next body of work, a series of photocollages entitled "STRIP," Carr formed androgynous figures out of cut-up parts from male and female bodies. Upsetting the familiar and the expected, "STRIP" humorously challenges the assumption of gender constancy. In 2005, Carr began to photograph mothers with their children, a project that eventually expanded into an exploration of the psychological tensions of the mother/child relationship within the home.

Carr collaborated with Atlanta artist Bill Orisich in 2012 on the video, "There's No Place Like..." The surreal project focuses on interactions between a woman and two young girls. In 2016, Carr again collaborated with Orisich to create "When I Whistle...," a film installation about home set in the Swan House. The Swan House is the former residence of the Edward H. Inman family and is now a museum associated with the Atlanta History Center.

Carr's photographs have been included in the Atlanta Contemporary Art Center 2005 Biennial, the Huntsville Museum of Art 2005 Triennial, and in 2009 at the Smithsonian National Portrait Gallery. Her work is part of the permanent collection of The Museum of Contemporary Art of Georgia.
