= Frederick Carr =

American meteorologist (born 1947)

- Born: June 22, 1947 (age 79); Beverly, Massachusetts, U.S.
- Occupation: Meteorologist
- Title: Professor Emeritus, University of Oklahoma School of Meteorology

Frederick Carr (born June 22, 1947) is a meteorologist who was president for the 2016 term of the American Meteorological Society. He was formerly the McCasland Foundation Professor of Meteorology and is now a professor emeritus at the University of Oklahoma School of Meteorology.
