= Rosetta Ernestine Carr =

Canadian photographer and businessperson

Rosetta Ernestine Carr (1845 – July 6, 1907) was a Canadian photographer and businessperson.

The daughter of Henry Watson, a farmer, and Rosetta Goodall, she was born Rosetta Ernestine Watson in Drummond township, Canada West and studied photography in New York City, in New Haven, Connecticut and in William Notman's Ottawa studio. Carr moved to Winnipeg in 1883 and bought George Searl's photographic business in the following year. She named her company the American Art Gallery. She was admired for the quality of her work, especially her portraits. Carr also photographed the landscape between Port Arthur and the Rocky Mountains. Carr sold her business in 1899, later moving to Ottawa.

She won a diploma and medal at the Colonial and Indian Exhibition of 1886. She also won a number of prizes at the Winnipeg Industrial Exhibition; when she was granted exclusive rights to photograph the exhibition grounds in 1893, her competition boycotted the exhibition and Carr won all the prizes.

She married a man named Carr; the date of the marriage and the date when she later became a widow are not known.

Carr died in Ottawa, Ontario, in 1907.
