= Job Carr =

American pioneer

- Founder of Tacoma

Postmaster and Mayor
- Constituency: Tacoma, Washington

Personal details
- Born: July 2, 1813 Gloucester County, New Jersey
- Died: August 10, 1887 (aged 74) Tacoma, Washington
- Resting place: Tacoma Cemetery

Job Carr (July 2, 1813 - August 10, 1887) was the founder of Tacoma, Washington, United States.

A Union veteran of the United States Civil War, Carr came west in 1864 to settle on a 168-acre claim in what is now Tacoma. He was the first permanent European American settler in the area and built a cabin on his claim, which doubled as the United States Post Office when he was appointed postmaster. He was an early promoter of Tacoma as a potential terminus for the Northern Pacific Railroad, and encouraged settlement in the new town.

A replica of Carr's original cabin stands near the original location as a museum of early Tacoma and his role in it.
