= Samuel S. Carr =

American painter (1837–1908)

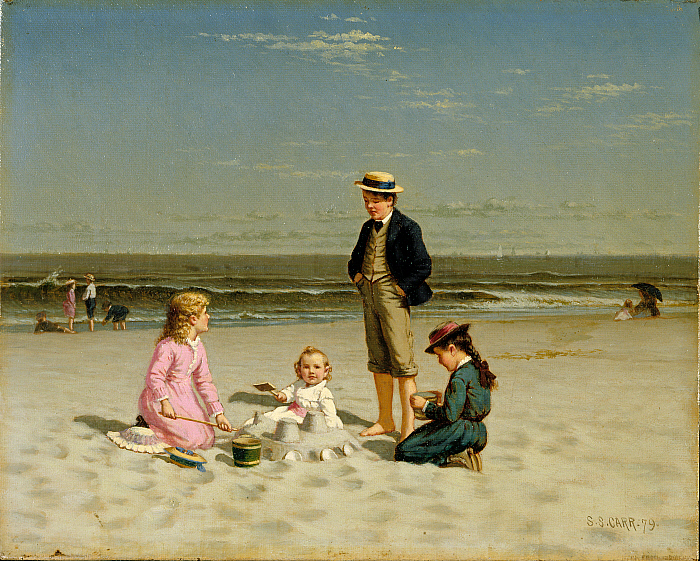
Children Playing on the Beach (1879), oil on canvas, Clark Art Institute

Samuel S. Carr (1837–1908) was an American pastoral and landscape painter. Originally from England, where he trained at the Royal School of Design in Chester, he relocated to the U.S. (specifically, New York City, where he later studied mechanical drawing in 1865) around 1862. He is recorded as having lived in Brooklyn from 1879 to 1907, during which he developed an eerie style of painting in which shapes would be repeated, flipped, and rotated over and over, while still remaining lifelike. He lived in Brooklyn along with his sister, Annie, and her husband, John Bond. He never married. He often signed his pieces "S.S. Carr". Some of his paintings have sold at auction for more than US$70,000 in August 2000 ($130,870 adjusted for inflation).

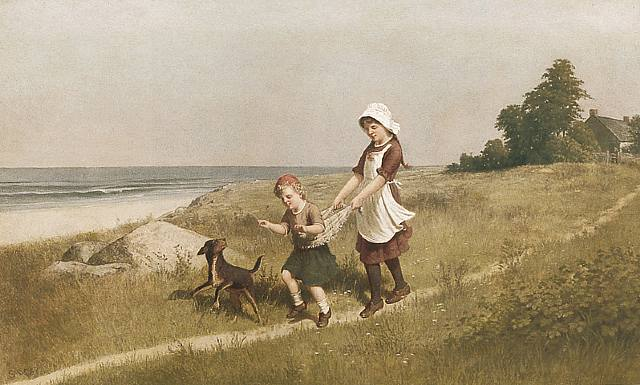
Frolic Along a Country Path
