= Gerry Carr (disambiguation) =

Gerry Carr (1936–2019) is a British discus thrower.

Gerry Carr may also refer to:

- Gerry Carr, footballer for Sligo Rovers
- Gerry Carr, candidate for Belfast South (UK Parliament constituency)

== See also ==
- Gerald Carr (disambiguation)
