= Alan Carr (footballer) =

Australian rules footballer

Personal information
- Full name: Alan Carr
- Born: 21 April 1939 (age 87)
- Original team: Mentone
- Height: 188 cm (6 ft 2 in)
- Weight: 87 kg (192 lb)
- Position: Ruck

Playing career^{1}
Years	Club	Games (Goals)
1959–66	North Melbourne	66 (13)
- ^{1} Playing statistics correct to the end of 1966.

Alan Carr (born 21 April 1939) is a former Australian rules footballer who played for the North Melbourne Football Club in the Victorian Football League (VFL). While captain-coach of Frankston in the 1968 VFA season, Carr had to have an eye removed, due to an injury sustained in a game against Box Hill.
