= Carr Clifton =

American photographer

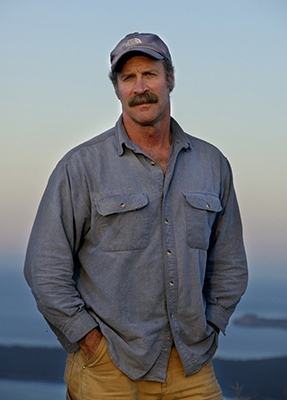
- Born: April 17, 1957 (age 69); California
- Known for: Photography
- Website: http://www.carrclifton.com/

Carr Clifton (born April 17, 1957 in California) is a local American landscape, nature and wilderness photographer. A native Californian living in the northern Sierra Nevada near Taylorsville, California, Carr began photographing and color printing professionally in 1979 after seeking advice and inspiration from his mentor and neighbor, pioneering 20th century master landscape and conservation photographer Philip Hyde. Credits include a US Postal Service stamp of Acadia National Park and numerous exhibit format books. Clifton has spent thirty-five years exploring and documenting endangered, wild landscapes, creating an immense body of work with a large format 4x5 film camera, and more recently a digital camera.

A member of the International League of Conservation Photographers (iLCP), Clifton has worked extensively with local, national and international conservation organizations helping to communicate important conservation objectives. His photographs have appeared in hundreds of conservation publications including Sierra Magazine, Wilderness, The Wilderness Committee, ForestEthics, The Conservation Fund, Ecotrust and the prestigious Cemex Conservation book series. Carr's book, Wild by Law, is the result of his collaboration with Earthjustice (previously Sierra Club Legal Defense Fund) and is a visual documentation of the impact environmental law has made on our nation's institutions and conservation policies. Collaborating with author Wade Davis and the International League of Conservation Photographers, Carr's most recent project, The Sacred Headwaters, The Fight to Save the Stikine, Skeena and Nass features photographs from Carr and other iLCP photographers, conveying the importance of protecting a unique, fragile and extraordinary ecosystem

== Awards ==
- International ColoR Awards
- Theodore Roosevelt Association Founders Medal, Outstanding Expeditionary Achievement, 1992 Rio Roosevelt Expedition
- Detroit Creative Directors Silver Caddy Award, Outstanding Landscape Photography in Advertising
- Three Women, Three Hundred Miles, Best Documentary Feature Film, Durango Film Festival 2003

== Books ==
- California Magnificent Wilderness, Westcliffe Publishers, 1986, ISBN 0-942394-35-6
- New York, Images of the Landscape, Westcliffe Publishers, 1988, ISBN 0-942394-57-7
- The Hudson, A River That Flows Both Ways, Westcliffe Publishers, 1989, ISBN 0-929969-06-5
- Wild By Law, Sierra Club Books & EarthJustice, 1990, ISBN 0-87156-627-3
- Wild & Scenic California, The Natural Landscape, Brown Trout Publishers, 1995, ISBN 1-56313-640-6
- California Coast Littlebook, Westcliffe Publishers, 1996, ISBN 1-56579-136-3
- California Wildflowers Littlebook, Westcliffe Publishers, 1996, ISBN 1-56579-134-7
- California Reflections Littlebook, Westcliffe Publishers, 1996, ISBN 1-56579-135-5
- The Sacred Headwaters, The Fight to Save the Stikine, Skeena and Nass, 2011, Greystone Publishers, ISBN 978-1553658801

== Documentary ==
Three Women, Three Hundred Miles, Defiance House Pictures, 2003

== Education ==
Commercial Photography Degree, 1979, Colorado Mountain College, Glenwood Springs, Colorado
