= Gene Carr =

Gene Carr may refer to:

- Gene Carr (cartoonist) (1881–1959), comic strip artist
- Gene Carr (ice hockey) (1951–2023), ice hockey player
