= David Carr (philosopher of education) =

British philosopher

- Born: 1944 (age 81–82)

Philosophical work
- Era: 21st-century philosophy
- Region: Western philosophy
- Institutions: University of Edinburgh
- Main interests: philosophy of education, virtue ethics

David Carr (born March 1944) is a British philosopher of education and Professor Emeritus at the University of Edinburgh. He is known for his works on philosophy of education, virtue ethics, and aesthetics.

== Books ==
- Making Sense of Education: An Introduction to the Philosophy and Theory of Education and Teaching, Routledge 2003
- Spirituality, Philosophy and Education (Eds. David Carr and John Haldane), Routledge 2003
- Professionalism and Ethics in Teaching, Routledge 2000
- Education, Knowledge and Truth: Beyond the Postmodern Impasse (Ed. David Carr), Routledge 1998
- Educating the Virtues: An Essay on the Philosophical Psychology of Moral Development and Education, Routledge 1991
