= Kelly Carr =

American journalist

- Born: 1980 or 1981 (age 45–46)
- Occupation: journalist
- Years active: 1995–
- Awards: Foreign Press Association Media Award 2011; Gerald Loeb Award 2012; Goldsmith Prize 2014; National Press Club Award 2012; New York Press Club Award 2012; TRACE Prize 2018

Kelly Carr (born 1980 or 1981) is an American investigative business journalist. Carr started her career as a sports reporter for the Times Leader in Wilkes-Barre, Pennsylvania while in high school. She later worked as a general assignment reporter for the Battle Creek Enquirer and then as an education and municipal reporter at The Arizona Republic.

As a freelance investigative reporter for Reuters, Carr contributed to award-winning reports on shell companies and accounting fraud in the U.S. Defense Department. She was part of the team that worked on the Luxembourg Leaks project, exposing tax-saving schemes. Carr received a Spotlight Investigative Journalism Fellowship from The Boston Globe in 2016, leading to the series "Secrets in the Sky" on FAA registration issues, which won the 2018 TRACE Prize for Investigative Reporting.

== Early life ==
As a young child in Pennsylvania, Carr went to Holy Name School, where she won an essay contest while in the third grade sponsored by the West Side Woman's Club. In 1989, she was a member of the gymnastics team at the YMCA in Pittston, Pennsylvania. She attended Crestwood High School in Mountain Top, Pennsylvania, where she played on the volleyball team. She earned her B.S. in Journalism from West Virginia University in 2003, and her M.F.A. in Creative Nonfiction from Goucher College in 2006.

== Career ==
Carr began her career as a sports reporter for the Times Leader in Wilkes-Barre, Pennsylvania while still a high school student. Throughout college, she worked as a sports correspondent for various news outlets, including the Associated Press. After graduating, she worked as a general assignment reporter for the Battle Creek Enquirer, then moved to The Arizona Republic, where she worked as an education and municipal reporter, and became the Online Platform Coordinator in 2007.

Carr taught as an adjunct professor at Arizona State University's Walter Cronkite School of Journalism and Mass Communication, and became the training director and online producer for the school's Donald W. Reynolds National Center for Business Journalism.

While working for the center, Carr also worked as a freelance investigative reporter for Reuters. Together with a team from Reuters, she wrote an award-winning series of reports on shell companies. The first report in the series, "A Little House of Secrets on the Great Plains", earned Carr and Brian Glow the 2011 Foreign Press Association Media Award for Financial/Economic Reporting. The entire series earned the team the 2012 New York Press Club Business Reporting Award for Newswire, the 2012 Gerald Loeb Award for News Services, and the 2012 National Press Club Award for Consumer Journalism, Periodicals.

In 2014, Carr and Scot J. Paltrow wrote "Unaccountable" for Reuters, a piece on accounting fraud in the U.S. Defense Department that won a Goldsmith Prize Special Citation.

Carr worked on the Luxembourg Leaks project for the International Consortium of Investigative Journalists (ICIJ). The ICIJ team produced a series of reports beginning in 2014 on a cache of leaked confidential tax rulings by the Grand Duchy of Luxembourg allowing corporations to save billions of dollars in taxes.

In 2016, Carr received a Spotlight Investigative Journalism Fellowship from The Boston Globe, which includes $100,000 to work on in-depth investigative projects. Working with Jaimi Dowdell, she wrote a series called "Secrets in the Sky" about holes in the Federal Aviation Administration's registration process that won the 2018 TRACE Prize for Investigative Reporting.

== Selected articles ==
- "A Little House of Secrets on the Great Plains", winner of several awards
- "Secrets in the Sky, Part 1", 2018 TRACE Award winner
- "Secrets in the Sky, Part 2", 2018 TRACE Award winner
- "Unaccountable", winner of the 2014 Goldsmith Award Special Citation
