= Margaret Carr (novelist) =

British novelist

- Born: 25 November 1935 (age 90); Salford, England
- Other names: Martin Carroll; Carole Kerr; Belle Jackson
- Education: High school
- Occupations: Mystery and romance writer
- Organizations: Crime Writers' Association
- Parent(s): Richard Taylor; Isabel Jackson Taylor

Margaret Carr (born 25 November 1935) is a British author of mysteries and romance novels who has written under the pseudonyms of Martin Carroll, Carole Kerr, and Belle Jackson, as well as her own name. Born in Salford, England, she is the daughter of Richard and Isabel Taylor. Critic Herbert Harris says Carr "brings a lighthearted touch to the romantic thriller" meant for an audience of "female readers, particularly the young and unsophisticated...".

== Bibliography ==
=== As Margaret Carr ===
- Spring Into Love (1967) OCLC 30291309
- Tread Warily at Midnight (1971) OCLC 16200548
- Dangerous Affair (1971) OCLC 316197640
- Sitting Duck (1972) OCLC 16198227
- Who's the Target? (1974) OCLC 16234286
- Wait for the Wake (1974) OCLC 16280499
- Too Close for Comfort (1974) OCLC 16298148
- Blood Will Out (1975) OCLC 16299645
- Sharendel (1976) OCLC 16367299
- Blindman's Bluff (1976) OCLC 16298048
- Out of the Past (1976) OCLC 16381444
- Dare the Devil (1976) OCLC 315717348
- Twin Tragedy (1977) OCLC 16368420
- The Witch of Wykham (1978) OCLC 59830893
- An Innocent Abroad (1979) OCLC 59833691
- Daggers Drawn (1980) OCLC 16547928
- Dark Intruder (1991) OCLC 220750617
- Deadly Pursuit (1991) OCLC 220750584
- Disputed Love (1999) OCLC 808152074
- Beloved Enemy (1999) OCLC 811769566
- The Waiting Time (2000) OCLC 811848567
- The House in the Pines (2000) OCLC 811773920
- The Heat of the Moment (2007) OCLC 861302496
- The Art of Romance (2007) OCLC 808372005
- A Dark Gentleman (2007) OCLC 811770505
- For the Love of a Devil (2009) OCLC 809410200
- A Dream Come True (2009) OCLC 427612261
- A Caring Heart (2010) OCLC 811769656

=== As Martin Carroll ===
- Begotten Murder (1967) OCLC 464354
- Blood Vengeance (1968) OCLC 30271709
- Dead Trouble (1968) OCLC 30273928
- Goodbye Is Forever (1968) OCLC 30276166
- Too Beautiful to Die (1969) OCLC 30267595
- Bait (1970) OCLC 105636
- Miranda Said Murder (1970) OCLC 30283259
- Hear No Evil (1971) OCLC 16191081

=== As Carole Kerr ===
- Not for Sale (1975) OCLC 16286291
- Shadow of the Hunter (1975) OCLC 16308015
- A Time to Surrender (1975) OCLC 59703328
- Love All Start (1977) OCLC 16367409
- Lamb to the Slaughter (1978) OCLC 16425581
- When Dreams Come True (1980) OCLC 16495570
- Stolen Heart (1981) OCLC 16541293

=== As Belle Jackson ===
- In the Dark of the Day (1988) OCLC 17773458
- Valdez's Lady (1989) OCLC 19774765
