= Julian Carr =

Julian Carr may refer to:

- Julian S. Carr (1845–1924), American industrialist (Bull Durham Tobacco), philanthropist, and banker
- Julian Carr (politician) (1824–1886), Member of the Western Australian Legislative Council
