= Richard Carr =

Richard Carr may refer to:

- Richard Carr (field hockey) (1911–2000), Indian Olympic field hockey player
- Richard Carr (screenwriter) (1929–1988), American screenwriter
- Richard Carr (chaplain) (1925–2002), American Air Force chaplain
- Richard Carr (businessman) (1938–2025), English business executive and director of Arsenal Football Club
- Richard Carr (blues musician), Canadian blues singer and guitarist
- Richard Carr (historian) (born 1985), historian, political commentator and academic
