= Daniel Carr =

Daniel Carr or Dan Carr could refer to:

- Daniel Carr (footballer) (born 1994), Trinidad and Tobago footballer
- Daniel Carr (ice hockey) (born 1991), Canadian hockey forward
- Dan Carr (poet) (1951–2012), American typographer and poet
- Danny Carr, American lawyer
