= Oscar Clark Carr Jr. =

Oscar Clark Carr Jr. (August 4, 1923 – November 5, 1977) was an American civil rights activist and leading member of the American Episcopal Church.

== Biography ==
Oscar Carr was born in Clarksdale, Mississippi. He graduated from the United States Naval Academy and served as a naval officer for three years before returning home to his family cotton farm. Carr credited the "racial militancy" of Governor Ross Barnett of Mississippi and Governor George Wallace of Alabama for spurring his interest in civil rights. Working with state NAACP leader Aaron Henry, he started an anti-poverty community action group in Coahoma County. Together they also enrolled 6,000 children in the Head Start program.

In 1968, he was co-director—with civil rights leader Charles Evers—of the Mississippi presidential campaign of Senator Robert F. Kennedy. Later the same year he was a key member of the Loyal Democrats of Mississippi delegation which successfully challenged the regular delegation from the state for their seats at the Democratic National Convention in Chicago.

In 1971, Carr became the Episcopal Church's first executive for stewardship and development. In February 1977 he left the job to become the president of the National Council on Philanthropy.

Carr died of cancer on November 5, 1977 at the age of 54. Over 500 people attended his funeral at the Church of the Heavenly Rest in New York City on 8 November, which was presided over by Bishop Paul Moore.
