= Harold Herbert Carr =

Harold Herbert Carr (25 January 1880–8 March 1973) was a New Zealand land court judge and administrator. Of Māori descent, he identified with the Ngati Kahungunu iwi. He was born in Wairoa, Hawke's Bay, New Zealand on 25 January 1880.
