= Peggy G. Carr =

American expert on educational assessment

Peggy G. Carr (born in the 1950s) is an American specialist on the developmental psychology and statistics of educational assessment. She was appointed commissioner of the National Center for Education Statistics by President Joe Biden in 2021 and served until February 24, 2025. Carr is the first NCES commissioner to be forcibly removed from their six-year appointment.

== Early life and education ==
Carr was born in the 1950s in Cleveland, Ohio, where her parents had relocated from North Carolina as part of the Second Great Migration. Soon after she began her schooling, the family returned to eastern North Carolina, where she attended racially integrated schools even before the full national implementation of desegregation triggered by the Brown v. Board of Education decision.

Following this, she majored in psychology at North Carolina Central University, a historically black university, graduating in 1976 with a concentration in statistics. She continued her education with a master's degree (1978) and Ph.D. (1982) in Developmental Psychology from Howard University, also historically black.

== Career ==
Carr became a researcher in the Statistical and Research Computer Laboratory at Howard University, and taught statistics as an adjunct faculty member there for over 15 years. She has been involved as a member of many doctoral dissertation committees throughout her career. Carr has published research articles across many disciplines of study, including child psychology, social psychology, experimental psychology, bio-statistics, student achievement, and assessment methodology. She joined the United States Department of Education as chief statistician for the Office for Civil Rights, and moved to the National Center for Education Statistics in 1993. She served there as associate commissioner for assessment, for more than 20 years, before in 2021 being appointed by President Joe Biden to a six-year term as commissioner of the center. In doing so, she became "the first person of color in an executive management position at the National Center for Education Statistics, and among the first persons of color to be accepted as part of the Federal Senior Executive Service at the US Department of Education". Currently Carr works for the University of Maryland as a visiting professor in the Department of Human Development and Quantitative Methodology.

== Recognition ==
Carr is a recipient of the 2008 Presidential Meritorious Executive Rank Award, and the 2016 Golden Apple Award for exceptional service of the secretary of education. She was the 2022 recipient of the Distinguished Public Service Award of the American Educational Research Association.
