= Homer M. Carr =

American politician & locomotive engineer

Homer Meade Carr (July 22, 1887 – February 14, 1964) was an American politician and locomotive engineer.

Carr was born in Malta, Morgan County, Ohio. He moved to Proctor, St. Louis County, Minnesota in 1906 and lived in Proctor with his wife and family. Carr served in the United States Army during World War I and was commissioned a first lieutenant while stationed in France. Carr worked a locomotive engineer for the Duluth, Missabe and Northern Railway. Carr served on the Proctor School Board from 1928 to 1933 and was thee school board treasurer. Carr served in the Minnesota House of Representatives in 1933 and 1934 and then served in the Minnesota Senate from 1935 until his death in 1934 while still in office. He was a Democrat.
