= Peggy Carr =

Vincentian poet

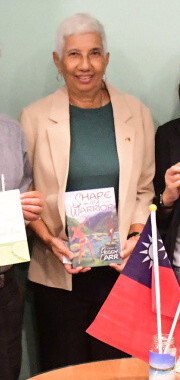
Peggy Carr at a Taiwanese literary event

Peggy Carr (born c. 1955) is a Vincentian journalist, poet, and diplomat. Now based in Taiwan, she has served as a representative of Saint Vincent and the Grenadines in the country.

== Biography ==
Carr was born in Saint Vincent around 1955. She grew up in a small rural village and, though her mother worked in the city, she lived on a farm with her grandparents. She began writing poetry at a young age.

As a journalist, Carr worked as an officer for the Agency for Public Information, formerly the Government Information Service, in Saint Vincent and the Grenadines. After visiting Taiwan several times, she moved there in 2000. She has worked in news media there, including as an editor at the Central News Agency.

In addition to her work as a journalist, Carr served as an unofficial envoy from Saint Vincent and the Grenadines to Taiwan for many years, before an embassy was formally opened in 2019. Her efforts included helping Vincentian students in Taiwan adjust to the local culture. After the embassy opened, Carr was named a cultural ambassador of Saint Vincent and the Grenadines in late 2019.

Carr's poetry has been published in several anthologies including Creation Fire: A CAFRA Anthology of Caribbean Women's Poetry, Caribbean Poetry Now, and the Oxford Book of Caribbean Verse in 2005. Her first solo collection, Echoes from a Lonely Nightwatch, was published in 1989, followed by Fresh Tracks in an Ancient Land in 1996 and Honey and Lime in 2006.

Her first novel, Shape of a Warrior, a work of young adult historical fiction, was published in October 2020 by the Dominica-based Emmanuel Publishing House.

Carr primarily writes in English, but her book Honey and Lime also contains a section in Vincentian Creole.

In 2014, her poem "Flight of the Firstborn" was chosen by BBC Radio Scotland to represent Saint Vincent and the Grenadines in its "Poetry Postcards" series.

== Selected works ==
- Echoes from a Lonely Nightwatch (1989)
- Fresh Tracks in an Ancient Land (1996)
- Honey and Lime (2006)
