= Tony Carr (footballer, born 1901) =

English footballer

Personal information
- Full name: Anthony Grey Carr
- Date of birth: 18 May 1901
- Place of birth: Hartley, Northumberland, England
- Date of death: 1979 (aged 83–84)
- Position: Goalkeeper

Senior career*
Years	Team	Apps	(Gls)
1919–1920	Seaton Delaval		
1920–1921	Bates United		
1921–1922	Sunderland	0	(0)
1922–1924	Newport County	80	(0)
1924–1925	Sheffield Wednesday	0	(0)
1925–1926	Seaton Delaval Villa		
1926–1928	Preston North End	59	(0)
1928–1929	Craghead United		
1929–1930	South Shields	40	(0)
1930–1934	Blyth Spartans		
1934–1935	New Brighton	13	(0)
1935	Supermarine Sports		
1936	Nelson		
Total		192	(0)
- * Club domestic league appearances and goals

Anthony Grey Carr (18 May 1901 – 1968) was an English footballer who played in the Football League for New Brighton, Newport County, Preston North End and South Shields.
