= Patrick Eugene Carr =

American judge

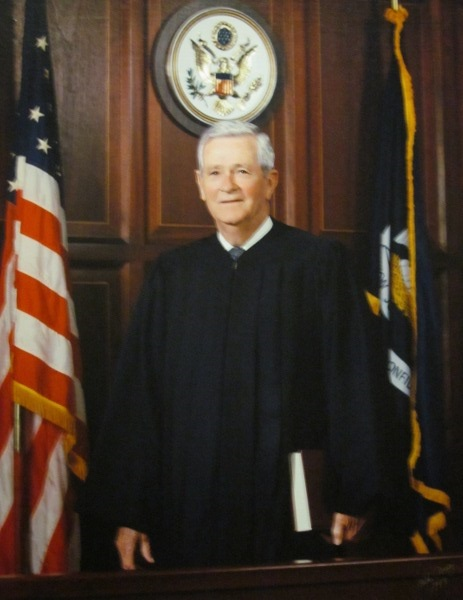

Senior Judge of the United States District Court for the Eastern District of Louisiana
- In office October 1, 1991 – June 1, 1998

Judge of the United States District Court for the Eastern District of Louisiana
- In office September 26, 1979 – October 1, 1991
- Appointed by: Jimmy Carter
- Preceded by: Seat established by 92 Stat. 1629
- Succeeded by: Helen Ginger Berrigan

Personal details
- Born: Patrick Eugene Carr; October 2, 1922 Jasper County, Mississippi
- Died: June 1, 1998 (aged 75) New Orleans, Louisiana
- Education: Loyola University New Orleans College of Law (LLB)

Patrick Eugene Carr (October 2, 1922 – June 1, 1998) was a United States district judge of the United States District Court for the Eastern District of Louisiana.

== Education and career ==
Born in Jasper County, Mississippi to Eugene Alfonse Carr and Sarah Carr, Carr served in the United States Army Air Corps during World War II, from 1940 to 1945, achieving the rank of Technical Sergeant. He attended St. Bernard Junior College (later Southern Benedictine College, closed in 1979) in Cullman, Alabama between September 1940 and June 1942, and returned to his education after the war, attending Loyola University New Orleans in New Orleans, Louisiana from February 1946 to June 1947. He received a Bachelor of Laws from Loyola University New Orleans College of Law in 1950 and was thereafter in private practice in Metairie, Louisiana from 1950 to 1975. He was a judge of the 24th Judicial District Court of Jefferson Parish, Louisiana from 1975 to 1979.

He was the National Commander of the Veterans of Foreign Wars from 1972-1973.

== Federal judicial service ==
On June 14, 1979, Carr was nominated by President Jimmy Carter to a new seat on the United States District Court for the Eastern District of Louisiana created by 92 Stat. 1629. He was confirmed by the United States Senate on September 25, 1979, and received his commission on September 26, 1979. He assumed senior status on October 1, 1991, serving in that capacity until his death, on June 1, 1998, in New Orleans.

== Personal ==
Carr and his wife, Jean, were married on December 20, 1947. They had four daughters and three sons.

== Sources ==
Legal offices
Preceded by Seat established by 92 Stat. 1629	Judge of the United States District Court for the Eastern District of Louisiana; 1979–1991	Succeeded by Helen Ginger Berrigan
