= Jimmy Carr (bookmaker) =

James Mackay Carr (c. 1864 – 31 March 1942), always known as Jimmy Carr, was an Adelaide bookmaker.

== History ==
As a young man he worked for Sir John Morphett at Cummins, South Australia, and the horse trainer John Henry Hill (died 15 August 1918) at Rhine Street, St Leonards (now Glenelg North). He eventually became one of South Australia's biggest bookmakers, operating from the Globe Hotel, Rundle Street, before the new Tattersalls Club was built.

Sometime before 1900 he took on the young Sol Green as an assistant, and Green credited Carr with giving him his first real start. When Green returned to Melbourne, 18 months later, George Nelson took his place.

Changes in legislation forced the on-course bookmakers out of business, and Carr and Nelson became wood and charcoal merchants, building up a large clientele in a remarkably short time.

== Family ==
Carr was married to Edith Frances Carr (c. 1874 – 24 April 1944).

They had a home at 24 Trevelyan Street, Wayville.
