= Kerr (surname) =

- Pronunciation: cerr, care, cur or carr

Origin
- Region of origin: England, Scotland

Kerr /kɛər/ is an English and Scottish surname with multiple possible origins.

It is possible that the surname Kerr comes from Brittonic roots, stemming from the Cumbric word caer (sometimes written as ker), meaning fortress or stronghold.

It may also be a topographic name for someone who lived by a marsh or swampy woodland, taken from the Middle English kerr means ‘brushwood wet ground.’ See Clan Kerr for the Scottish origins.

Notable people with the surname include:

== A ==
- Alan Kerr (born 1964), Canadian ice hockey player
- Alan Kerr (doctor) (born 1934/1935), New Zealand surgeon
- Alex Kerr (disambiguation), several people
- Alexander Kerr (1892–1964), English marine engineer on the Endurance
- Alexander Kerr (banker) (1838–1909), Scottish banker
- Alexander Kerr (professor) (born 1970), the Linda and Jack Gill Chair in Music at Jacobs School of Music, Indiana University
- Alexander Robert Kerr (1770–1831), Royal Navy officer
- Alfred Kerr (1867–1948), German journalist, critic and writer
- Alice Forgy Kerr (born 1954), American politician from Kentucky
- Allen Kerr (politician) (born 1956), member of the Arkansas House of Representatives
- Amabel Kerr (1846–1906), British writer
- Andrew Kerr (disambiguation), several people
- Angus W. Kerr (1873–1927), American politician
- Anita Kerr (1927–2022), American singer and arranger
- Archibald John Kerr Clark Kerr, 1st Baron Inverchapel (1882–1951), British diplomat
- Arthur Francis George Kerr (1877–1942), Irish medical doctor and botanist
- Austin Kerr (born 1989), member of American rock band Set It Off

== B ==
- Baine Kerr (1919–2008), American lawyer
- Barbara Kerr, Canadian equestrian
- Beatrice Kerr (1887–1971), Australian swimmer and diver
- Ben Kerr (1930–2005), Canadian broadcaster, and musician
- Bill Kerr (1922–2014), Australian actor
- Brian Kerr (disambiguation), several people
- Bronwen Kerr, New Zealand architect
- Brook Kerr (born 1973), American actress

== C ==
- Charles Kerr (disambiguation), several people
- Clark Kerr (1911–2003), American professor of economics, academic administrator (first Chancellor of the University of California, Berkeley)
- Cristie Kerr (born 1977), American golfer

== D ==
- Daniel Kerr (born 1983), Australian rules footballer (son of Australian rules footballer Roger Kerr and brother of Samantha "Sam" Kerr)
- Daniel Kerr (politician) (1836–1916), American politician
- David Kerr (disambiguation), several people
- Deborah Kerr (1921–2007), British film and television actress
- Deborah Kerr (canoeist) (born 1997), Scottish canoeist
- Dickey Kerr (1893–1963), American baseball player
- Don Kerr, Canadian musician and record producer
- Donald Kerr (disambiguation), several people
- Douglas Kerr (born 1951), British writer and literary academic
- Duncan Kerr (born 1952), Australian judge

== E ==
- Edward Kerr (born 1966), American actor
- Elizabeth Kerr (1912–2000), American actress
- Eloína Kerr (born 1959), Cuban runner
- Estelle Muriel Kerr (1879–1971), Canadian painter, illustrator and writer

== F ==
- Fergus Kerr (1931–2025), Scottish Roman Catholic priest and scholar
- Francis Hannah Kerr (1956–2008), known as Frankie Venom, Scottish-Canadian lead singer with Teenage Head
- Frank John Kerr (1918–2000), Australian astronomer and physicist
- Frank Kerr (footballer) (1889–1977), Australian rules footballer
- Frederick Kerr (1858–1933), English actor

== G ==
- Gavin Kerr (born 1977), British rugby union footballer
- George Kerr (disambiguation), multiple people
- Gordon Kerr (disambiguation), multiple people
- Graham Kerr (born 1934), British cooking personality
- Greg Kerr (born 1947), Canadian politician

== H ==
- Sir Hamilton Kerr, 1st Baronet (1903–1974), British politician
- Hamish Kerr (born 1996), New Zealand high jumper
- Hugh Kerr (born 1944), Scottish politician and social policy expert

== I ==
- Ian Mackenzie-Kerr (1929–2005), British book designer
- Imp Kerr (born 1980), Swedish-French artist

== J ==
- Jack Kerr (cricketer) (1910–2007), New Zealand cricketer
- Jack Kerr (ice hockey) (1863–1933), Canadian ice hockey player
- James/Jim Kerr, several people
- Jane Kerr (born 1968), Canadian competitive swimmer
- Jason Kerr (footballer) (born 1997), Scottish footballer
- Jasper Kerr (1898–1986), Scottish footballer
- Jean Kerr (1922–2003), American author and playwright
- Jerry Kerr (1912–1999), Scottish footballer
- John Kerr (disambiguation), several people
- Johnny Kerr (1932–2009), American basketball player, coach, executive, and broadcaster
- Josiah Kerr (1861–1920), American politician
- Joseph Kerr (1765–1837), American politician
- Joseph Kerr (Canadian politician) (died 1902), merchant and politician from Ontario
- Joseph Kerr (Wisconsin politician) (1804–1855), American politician
- Josh Kerr (rugby league) (born 1996), Australian rugby league player
- Josh Kerr (runner) (born 1997), British middle-distance runner
- Judith Kerr (1923–2019), German-born British writer and illustrator

== K ==
- Katharine Kerr (born 1944), American science fiction and fantasy novelist
- Kevin Kerr (disambiguation), several people

== L ==
- Liam Kerr (born 1975), British politician
- Liam Kerr (Gaelic footballer), Gaelic football player

== M ==
- Malcolm H. Kerr (1931–1984), American academic (see also his father Stanley Kerr and son Steve Kerr)
- Malcolm Kerr (politician) (born 1950), Australian politician
- Mark Kerr (disambiguation), several people
- Martin Kerr (born 1952), American neo-Nazi, commander of the New Order
- M. E. Kerr, a pseudonym used by Marijane Meaker (1927–2022), American novelist and short story writer
- Mel Kerr (1903–1980), Canadian baseball player
- Michael Kerr (disambiguation), several people
- Miranda Kerr (born 1983), Australian model

== N ==
- Nancy Kerr (born 1975), English folk musician
- Nancy Kerr (born 1947), Canadian curler
- Nick Kerr (born 1992), American basketball coach
- Norman Kerr (1834–1899), Scottish physician and social reformer

== O ==
- Orin Kerr (born 1971), American lawyer and scholar

== P ==
- Patrick Kerr (born 1956), American actor
- Paul Kerr (born 1964), English footballer
- Peg Kerr, American fantasy genre author
- Peter Kerr (disambiguation)
- Philip Kerr (1953–2018), British author
- Philip Kerr, 11th Marquess of Lothian (1882–1940), British politician, diplomat, and newspaper editor

== R ==
- Ralph Kerr (1891–1941), British Royal Navy captain of HMS Hood
- Ray Kerr (born 1994), American baseball player
- Robbie Kerr (racing driver) (born 1971), British race car driver
- Robbie Kerr (Australian cricketer) (born 1961), Australian cricket player
- Robert Kerr (disambiguation), several people
- Roger Kerr (1945–2011), New Zealand businessman
- Roger Kerr (footballer) (born 1960), India-born Australian rules footballer (father of Daniel and Sam Kerr)
- Ronan Kerr (?–2011), murdered Northern Irish police constable
- Ronnie Kerr (born 1974), American actor
- Rowan Rait Kerr (1891–1961), Irish cricketer and administrator
- Roy Kerr (born 1934), New Zealand mathematician

== S ==
- Samantha Kerr (born 1993), Australian soccer player (respectively the daughter and sister of footballers Roger Kerr and Daniel Kerr)
- Samantha Kerr (born 1999), Scottish football player
- Schomberg Henry Kerr, 9th Marquess of Lothian (1833–1900), British diplomat and politician
- Scott Kerr (born 1981), English footballer
- Shelley Kerr (born 1969), Scottish footballer and football manager
- Sinead Kerr (born 1978), Scottish ice dancer
- Sophie Kerr (1880–1965), American writer
- Stanley Kerr (1894–1976), American humanitarian, clinical biochemist and educator (father of academic Malcolm Kerr and grandfather of Steve Kerr)
- Stephen Kerr (born 1960), British politician
- Stephen Kerr (born 1992), Scottish professional wrestler known as Stevie Boy
- Steve Kerr (born 1965), American basketball player, broadcaster, executive, and coach (son of academic Malcolm Kerr and grandson of Stanley Kerr)
- Stu Kerr (1928–1994), American television personality

== T ==
- Taylor Kerr (rugby league) (born 2006), English rugby league player
- Thomas Kerr (Scottish politician) (born 1996), Scottish politician
- Tim Kerr (born 1960), Canadian professional ice hockey player

== V ==
- Vernon Kerr (1928–2020), American politician
- Veronica Kerr (born 1970), Swedish politician

== W ==
- Lord Walter Kerr (1839–1927), Scottish officer in the British Royal Navy
- Walter Kerr (1913–1996), American writer and theater critic
- Warwick Estevam Kerr (1922–2018), Brazilian agricultural engineer, geneticist, entomologist, and professor
- Wayne Kerr (born 1985), Irish rugby league player
- William Kerr (disambiguation), numerous people
- William Alexander Kerr (1831–1919), Scottish lieutenant in the 24th Bombay Native Infantry
- William G. Kerr, mayor of Hamilton, Ontario in 1853
- William Johnson Kerr (1787–1845), Canadian military and political leader
- W. Rolfe Kerr (born 1935), American religious leader in the Church of Jesus Christ of Latter-day Saints

== See also ==
- Ker (surname)
