= Ker =

Ker or KER may refer to:

== People and characters ==
- Ker (surname)
  - Ker, family name of the Dukes of Roxburghe
  - Frederick Ker, the appellant in the U.S. Supreme Court case Ker v. Illinois
- Ker, a spelling of the Guo surname
- Ker, a Keres or death-spirit of Greek myth
- Ker, in the 2000 film Battlefield Earth

== Places ==
- Ker, Azerbaijan, a village
- Kerala, an Indian state (postal code:KER)
- Kerang railway station, Australia (code:KER)
- Ayatollah Hashemi Rafsanjani Airport, Kerman, Iran (IATA:KER)
- County Kerry, Ireland (Chapman code:KER)

== Mathematics and physics ==
- kinetic energy recovery system (KER)
- ker, or kernel, in its various senses
- Ker, one of the Kelvin functions

== Other uses ==
- Capparis decidua, or ker, a tree and fruit used in various Indian cuisines
- VIXX 2016 Conception Ker, an album by South Korean band VIXX

== See also ==
- Kerr (disambiguation)
- Keir (disambiguation)
- Kher (disambiguation)
