= John Kerr =

John Kerr may refer to:

== Politics ==
=== Australia ===
- John Kerr (governor-general) (1914–1991), Australian governor-general

=== New Zealand ===
- John Kerr (Auckland politician), New Zealand politician
- John Kerr (Nelson politician) (1830–1898), New Zealand politician

=== United Kingdom ===
- John Kerr, 7th Marquess of Lothian (1794–1841), Scottish politician and peer
- John Kerr (British politician) (1852–1925), UK MP for Preston, 1903–1906
- John Kerr (physicist) (1824-1907), Scottish physicist
- John Henry Kerr (1871–1934), colonial governor in British India
- John Kerr, Baron Kerr of Kinlochard (born 1942), British diplomat

=== United States ===
- John Kerr (Ohio politician) (1778–1823), mayor of Columbus, Ohio
- John Leeds Kerr (1780–1844), U.S. senator from Maryland
- John Kerr (Virginia politician) (1782–1842), Virginia politician
- John Bozman Kerr (1809–1878), U.S. representative from Maryland
- John Kerr Jr. (congressman) (1811–1879), North Carolina politician and jurist
- John H. Kerr (1873–1958), North Carolina politician
- John H. Kerr Jr. (1900–1968), North Carolina politician
- John H. Kerr III (1936–2015), North Carolina politician

== Sciences ==
- John Kerr (physicist) (1824–1907), Scots physicist
- John Glasgow Kerr (1824–1901), physician and medical missionary
- John Martin Munro Kerr (1868–1960), Scottish professor of midwifery
- John Graham Kerr (1869–1957), Scottish embryologist and Member of Parliament
- John Kerr (pathologist) (1934–2024), Australian pathologist
- John Kerr (author) (1950–2016), American editor, psychologist

== Military ==
- John Brown Kerr (1847–1928), U.S. Army brigadier general and Medal of Honor recipient
- John Chipman Kerr (1887–1963), Canadian Victorian Cross recipient
- John Kerr (Royal Navy officer) (1937–2019), British admiral

== Sports ==
- Jack Kerr (ice hockey) (1863–1933), Canadian
- John Kerr (Scottish cricketer) (1885–1972), Scottish cricketer from Greenock
- John Kerr (baseball) (1898–1993), American baseball player
- Jack Kerr (cricketer) (1910–2007), New Zealand cricketer
- Johnny Kerr (1932–2009), professional basketball player
- John Kerr (Australian footballer) (1934–2005), Australian rules footballer
- John Kerr (soccer, born 1943) (1943–2011), Scottish-born Canadian soccer player
- John Kerr (sailor) (born 1951), Canadian sailor
- John Kerr (footballer, born 1959) (1959–2006), English footballer for Tranmere Rovers, Bristol City
- John Kerr (soccer, born 1965) (born 1965), American
- John Kerr (figure skater) (born 1980), Scottish ice dancer
- John Kerr (Scottish footballer), Scottish footballer

== Entertainment ==
- John Kerr (singer) (c. 1925–2006), Irish ballad singer
- John Kerr (actor) (1931–2013), American actor and lawyer
- John Kerr (broadcaster) (born 1942), Australian radio broadcaster

== Other ==
- John Hunter Kerr (1821–1874), Scottish-born grazier, Australian photographer and collector of indigenous artifacts
- John Kerr (minister) (1852–1920), Scottish minister, sportsman and sporting author
- Jake Kerr (businessman) (John Custance Kerr, born 1944), Canadian businessman
- John Law Kerr (1862–1952), American architect of the Radium Springs, Georgia golf course

== See also ==
- John Ker (disambiguation)
- John G. Kerr (disambiguation)
- Kerr (surname)
