= Kerr =

Kerr may refer to:

== People ==
- Kerr (surname)
- Kerr (given name)

== Places ==
United States

- Kerr Township, Champaign County, Illinois
- Kerr, Montana, A US census-designated place
- Kerr, Ohio, an unincorporated community
- Kerr County, Texas

== Other uses ==
- KERR, A US radio station
- Kerr metric, exact solution for the Einstein field equations
- Kerr, a brand of food Mason jars and lids
- Clan Kerr, a Scottish clan

== See also ==
- Ker (disambiguation)
