= James Kerr =

James or Jim Kerr may refer to:

== Sport ==
=== Association football ===
- James Kerr (football manager) (died 1933), English football manager
- James Kerr (footballer, born 1894), Scottish football wing half
- Jimmy Kerr (footballer, born 1919) (1919–2001), Scottish footballer (Hibernian FC)
- Jimmy Kerr (footballer, born 1932) (1932-1994), English footballer, see List of Oldham Athletic A.F.C. players (25–99 appearances)
- Jim Kerr (footballer, born 1942) (1942–2008), Scottish footballer
- Jimmy Kerr (footballer, born 1949), Scottish footballer (Bury FC)
- Jim Kerr (footballer, born 1959), Scottish footballer

=== Other sports ===
- Jamie Kerr (born 1975), Scottish cricketer
- James Reid Kerr (1883–1963), Scottish rugby player
- Jimmy Kerr (1910–1998), Scottish rugby player
- James Kerr (fencer) (1940–2023), Olympic fencer for the United States Virgin Islands
- Jim Kerr (American football) (1939–2008), American football player
- James Kerr (rower), Australian rower
- James Kerr (rugby union) (born 1975), New Zealand rugby union player
- Jim Kerr (bowls), Scottish bowls player

== Politicians ==
- James Kerr (New Zealand politician) (1834–1901), member of the New Zealand Legislative Council
- James Kerr (Pennsylvania politician) (1851–1908), American politician, U.S. congressman and Clerk of U.S. House of Representatives
- James Kerr (Texas politician) (1790–1850), American soldier and statesman who was prominent in the Republic of Texas
- James Hutchison Kerr (1837–1919), American educator, engineer, and politician from Colorado
- James Kirkpatrick Kerr (1841–1916), Canadian lawyer and senator
- James Stevingstone Kerr (1889–1960), member of the Queensland Legislative Assembly

== Other ==
- James Kerr, Scottish engineer and co-founder of locomotive builders Kerr Stuart
- James Kerr (surgeon) (1732–1782), Scottish surgeon and naturalist in India
- James Lennox Kerr (1899–1963), British author
- Jim Kerr (born 1959), Scottish musician with the group Simple Minds
- James S. Kerr, Scottish music publisher
- James S. Kerr (1909–2006), American businessman
- James Semple Kerr (1932–2014), Australian architectural historian and conservation practitioner
- James Taggart Kerr, U.S. Army general
