= Ker (surname) =

Ker is a surname. Notable people with the surname include:

- Alice Stewart Ker (1853–1943), Scottish doctor and suffragette
- Allan Ebenezer Ker (1883–1958), Scottish army officer and recipient of the Victoria Cross
- Ker Chien-ming (born 1951), Taiwanese politician
- Crawford Ker (born 1962), American football player
- David Ker (1758–1805), Scottish-Irish-American first residing professor of the University of North Carolina
- David Stewart Ker (1816–1878), Irish landowner and politician
- George Ker (1860–1922), Scottish footballer
- Humphrey Ker (born 1982), British actor, writer and comedian
- John Ker (disambiguation), several people
- Lucas Arnold Ker (born 1974), Argentinian tennis player
- Neil Ripley Ker (1908–1982), scholar of Anglo-Saxon literature
- Richard Ker (1822–1890), British politician from Ireland
- Richard Ker (MP) (1850–1942), British politician from Ireland
- Robert Ker (disambiguation), several people
- William Ker (disambiguation), several people

== See also ==
- Kerr (surname)
