= Thomas Forrester (disambiguation) =

Thomas Forrester is a fictional character.

Thomas Forrester may also refer to:

- Thomas Forrester (politician) (1790–1841), merchant and political figure in Nova Scotia
- Thomas Forrester (cricketer) (1873–1927), English cricketer
- Thomas Forrester (theologian) (1635?–1706), Scottish theologian
- Tom Forrester (1864–?), footballer
- Thomas Forrester (architect) (1838–1907), New Zealand architect
- Thomas Forrester, presenter and antiques expert on British television programme Bargain Hunt

== See also ==
- Tom Foerster (1928–2000), Democratic politician in Allegheny County, Pennsylvania
- Thomas Forester (born 1958), mutual fund manager
