= John Ker (disambiguation) =

John Ker (1673–1726) was a Scottish spy during the Jacobite risings.

John Ker may also refer to:

- John Ker (Latin poet) (died 1741), Scottish academic
- John Ker, 1st Duke of Roxburghe (c. 1680–1741)
- John Ker, 3rd Duke of Roxburghe (1740–1804), Scottish nobleman and bibliophile
- John Ker (planter) (1789–1850), American surgeon, planter, and politician in Louisiana
- John Ker (minister) (1819–1886), Scottish ecclesiastical writer and minister
- John Ker (priest), Canadian Anglican priest

== See also ==
- John Kerr (disambiguation)
