= Kers =

Kers is a surname. Notable people with the surname include:

- Koos Jeroen Kers (born 1986), Dutch racing cyclist
- Ronald Kers (born 1969), Dutch businessman
- Robert De Kers (1906–1987), Belgian jazz trumpeter and bandleader

== See also ==
- Ker (surname)
- Kinetic energy recovery system (KERS)
