= Keers =

Keers is a surname. Notable people with the surname include:

- Jim Keers (1931–2020), English footballer
- John Keers (1901–1963), English footballer
- Robert Young Keers (1908–1982), Irish-born physician and medical author

== See also ==
- Kers
