= Scottish music (1500–1899) =

== Births and deaths ==
=== Births ===
- Robert Carver (composer) (c. 1485 – c. 1570)
- Lady Nairn (1766–1845)
- James Scott Skinner (1843–1927)
- John Strachan (singer) (1875–1958)
- Jimmy MacBeath (1894–1974)
- Thomas Erskine, 6th Earl of Kellie (1732–81)

== Collections of songs or music ==
- 1700 "Original Scotch Tunes" by Henry Playford
- 1724 "The Ever Green" by Allan Ramsay (1686–1758)
- 1735 "Orpheus caledonius" by William Thomson
- 1751 "The Caledonian Pocket Companion" by James Oswald
- 1776 "Ancient and Modern Scottish Songs" by David Herd (1732–1810)
- 1787–1803 The Scots Musical Museum in 6 volumes by James Johnson (1753?–1811) with contributions from Robert Burns (1759–1796)
- 1803 "Minstrelsy of the Scottish Border" by Sir Walter Scott (1771–1832)
- 1819–1821 Jacobite Reliques in 2 volumes by James Hogg (1770–1835
- 1827 "Minstrelsy Ancient and Modern" by William Motherwell (1797–1835)
- 1847 "The Roxburghe Ballads"
- 1875 "Kerr's Collection of Merry Melodies for the Violin" by James S Kerr
- 1882 "English and Scottish Popular Ballads" by Francis James Child (1825–1896)
