= Bobby Kerr =

Bobby Kerr may refer to:

- Robert Kerr (athlete) (1882–1963), Irish Canadian sprinter
- Bobby Kerr (businessman) (born 1960), Irish entrepreneur and businessman
- Bobby Kerr (footballer, born 1901) (1901–1972), Scottish footballer
- Bobby Kerr (footballer, born 1929) (1929–2012), Scottish football forward for Darlington, Third Lanark, Stirling Albion and Greenock Morton
- Bobby Kerr (footballer, born 1947), Scottish football midfielder for Sunderland, Blackpool and Hartlepool United

== See also ==
- Robert Kerr (disambiguation)
