= Theo Müller =

German businessman (born 1940)

- Born: 29 January 1940 (age 86); Aretsried, German Reich
- Occupation: Owner of Theo Müller Group
- Children: 9

Theo Müller (29 January 1940) is a German businessman. He is the head of the dairy company Müller, which was founded by his grandfather.

== Early life ==
Theo Müller was born in Aretsried, Germany, in 1940, the son of Alois Müller.

== Career ==
The Müller company was founded in 1896 by his grandfather Ludwig Müller in Aretsried, Bavaria. In 1938, his father Alois Müller took over. Theo took over in 1971, when the dairy business only had four employees.

Today, apart from the dairy businesses, Theo Müller Group has a packing company (Optipack), logistics (Culina Group), transportation (Fahrzeugtechnik Aretsried), fruit processing (Muller Naturfarm) and a fish restaurant chain (Nordsee). More recent acquisitions have included companies making chilled salad, sauces and dressings, speciality fish and baked goods.

In 2012, the company purchased Robert Wiseman Dairies, which supplies 30% of the UK's fresh milk market, for £280 million. In November 2014, the company agreed to buy Dairy Crest's milk business for £80 million. Theo Müller commented, "Bringing the two dairy operations together will enhance the merged business's ability to compete and will ensure that customers continue to receive quality products at low prices".

Müller is the sole owner, and as of 2015, Ronald Kers is the CEO, replacing Heiner Kamps, who retired in 2015. The company now employs more than 20,000 workers.

== Personal life ==
Müller has nine children, seven with his wife Hanna Bittmann, whom he divorced in 1995, and two daughters with his partner Ines Hüvel. His eldest son, Stefan Müller, is a board member of Theo Müller Group. In 2023, Mülller married Beate Ebert, a businesswoman from Baden-Baden.

In 1995, Müller survived a kidnapping attempt in which a pistol and electrical-shock equipment was held to his head. He jumped out of the car, and was working again later that afternoon.

He has lived in Erlenbach, near Zurich, Switzerland since 2003. In an interview with Der Spiegel in 2003, Müller explained that he and his children were all moving to Switzerland to avoid having to pay Germany's 30% inheritance tax.

== Political views ==
Müller has been accused of being close to right-wing or extremist ideology on several occasions. This rumor was first reported by the Munich magazine Wiener in 1989. However, both Müller and the company have publicly stated that neither are close to any right-wing parties.

In a statement from early 2007, Müller's company not only rejected all claims but also made public that Müller considered himself a passionate supporter of the democratic constitutional order and that Müller was, in addition, a member of the CSU, Bavaria's long-time ruling party.

He confirmed in a December 2023 interview with the Handelsblatt newspaper that he held multiple private meetings with Alternative for Germany (AfD) co-leader Alice Weidel. Weidel was also in invited to his birthday party in 2025.

Following the Baden-Württemberg state election in 2026, Müller suggested in an interview with the Welt newspaper that the CDU should govern in a coalition or accept parliamentary support from the AfD rather than with the Greens. Following state elections in Saxony-Anhalt, Müller gave an interview to Welt am Sonntag calling on Chancellor Friedrich Merz to drop the SPD from the government and shift toward a CDU-AfD coalition instead or a minority rule backed by the Afd.
