= VFS Global =

Consular services outsourcing company

- Type: Private
- Founded: July 2001 in Mumbai, India
- Headquarters: Dubai
- Area served: Worldwide
- Key people: Zubin Karkaria (Founder & CEO); Jose Mancho (CFO); Jiten Vyas (CCO); Srinarayan Sankaran (COO); Nirbhik Goel (CHRO); Bernard Martyris (CCO)
- Number of employees: 17330 (as on 31 January 2026)
- Parent: The Blackstone Group (75%); Temasek Holdings (18%)
- Website: www.vfsglobal.com

VFS Global is a visa and passport administration outsourcing company for governments and diplomatic missions. Zubin Karkaria founded the company in 2001 while he was chief executive at Kuoni Travel. Formerly based in India, the company is now headquartered in Dubai, with offices in 147 countries. In 2024, the company processed over 100,000 applications daily, with over 100 million applications processed in the preceding five-year period.

Over the past two decades, VFS Global has expanded its global presence and broadened its range of services for governments and diplomatic missions, including seven global contracts from the governments of Austria, Australia, Iceland, Latvia, Norway, Sweden, and the United Kingdom. The company has faced criticism for alleged exploitative practices, lack of transparency and data security failures. Visa applicants from lower-income countries have reported missed flights and wrongful denials due to delays and errors, including failure to scan key documents.

== History ==
=== Origins and revenue model ===
Founder Zubin Karkaria conceived the idea for VFS Global while working with the Kuoni Group. Karkaria believed one could circumvent embassies' wait times required for processing visa applications by outsourcing the administrative work. He soon "persuaded the US government to pilot a scheme for Indian visa applicants to the US at its Mumbai embassy". The company opened its first visa processing centre in Mumbai that same year. In 2003, the company acquired a UK Government contract to process visa applications from India.

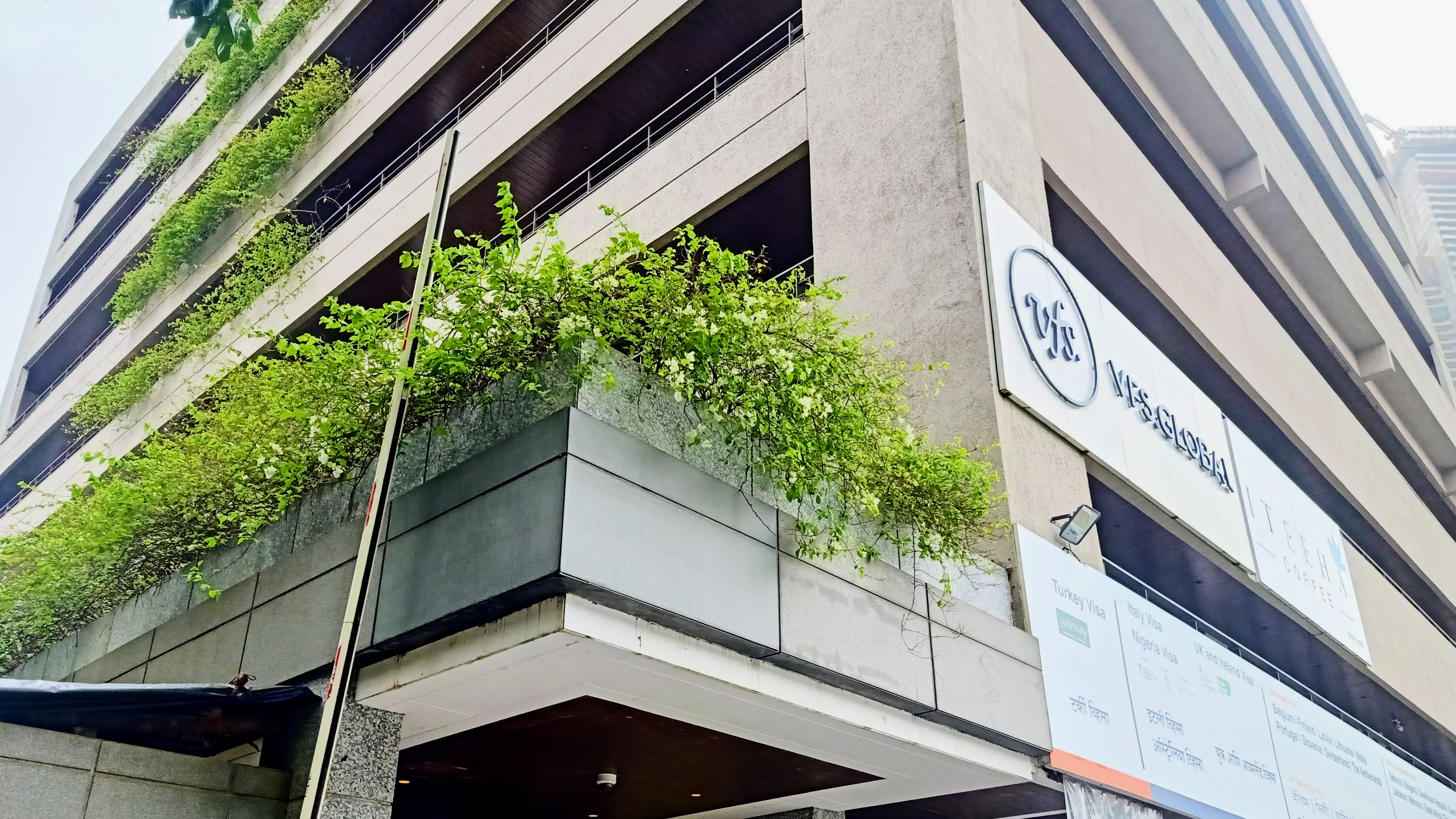
VFS Global Mumbai, India

By 2007, VFS Global had obtained its first global account from UK Visas and Immigration for operations in 33 countries. Within one year of gaining its account, the company's image was tarnished by a data breach that exposed the sensitive information of UK visa applicants. Despite recurrent data breaches, the company later obtained a major contract with the United Kingdom to administer the majority of the UK's visa applications. The contract marked a significant change in how visa applicants to the United Kingdom were charged to have their applications processed.

The company's growth was primarily due to its revenues from service fees paid directly by visa applicants. In 2009, financial records indicated that VFS Global's then-parent company, VF Worldwide Holdings, was an offshore corporation based in Mauritius, an African tax haven.

In 2016, CEO Zubin Karkaria was appointed Chevalier de l'Ordre National du Mérite for his role in developing the visa facilitation system and contributing to French tourism.

=== Expansion and growth ===
In 2016, EQT AB, the Swedish private equity group and parent company of VFS Global, took Kuoni private, and the tourism businesses were separated from VFS Global in 2017.

In August 2017, VFS Global acquired the UK-based visa service provider TT Services (TTS) for an undisclosed amount. At the time of the acquisition, TTS operated 51 visa application centres in over 35 countries, with 216 employees. In November of that year, VFS Global expanded its visa services in Cyprus, with new centres launched in the cities of Thiruvananthapuram, Goa, Gurugram, and Jaipur.

By 2019, VFS Global had partnerships with 60 client governments, with some contracts lasting over 15 years.

In January 2019, the parent company of VFS Global, EQT AB, declared its intention to sell the company. In August 2019, an in-depth financial investigation by the British newspaper The Independent revealed that VFS Global had experienced exponential growth in recent years and its shareholders extracted had £567 million through "distribution to owner" payments and inter-company loan write-offs. This growth has been attributed to the company's "exploitative" business practices.

In October 2021, Blackstone acquired a majority stake in VFS Global. Kuoni and Hugentobler Foundation remains a minority stakeholder. Before October 2021, the company was owned by a private equity fund and, as VF Worldwide Holdings, is incorporated in the African tax haven of Mauritius. Investors in the company include the Chinese and Emiratis investment authorities, the Ohio Police & Fire Pension Fund, and Theo Müller.

In October 2024, the Singaporean state-owned investment firm Temasek Holdings signed a purchase agreement to acquire an 18 per cent stake in VFS Global for $950 million. The agreement valued the company at $5 billion in equity and $7 billion in enterprise.

VFS Global launched the world's largest visa centre at Dubai in May 2025.

As of 2026, VFS Global has 70 countries governments, operating over 4,000 application centres in 167 countries.

==== Surge in application volume and global contracts ====
In 2023, VFS Global processed 24.1 million applications—a 35% increase from the previous year—bringing its daily processing volume to around 100,000 applications. The company also grew its client base to 69 governments, securing seven major global contracts in the same year. These included agreements with the United Kingdom, Australia, Norway, Sweden, Latvia, and Austria. Under these contracts, VFS Global provides services such as biometric collection, identity verification, and online application assistance.

One of the company's most significant 2023 contracts was for UK visas and citizenship services, which covers 84 new countries in addition to 58 existing ones. It plans to operate 240 Visa and Citizenship Application Service (VCAS) Centres across 142 countries, collectively processing visas and citizenship applications for an estimated 3.8 million individuals annually.

A major contract was awarded by Australia's Department of Home Affairs covering seven regions: the Americas, Mekong, the Middle East and North Africa, North Asia, the Pacific, South Asia, and Southeast Asia. Under the agreement, the company's responsibilities include biometric data gathering, identity verification, and digital assistance for applicants on Australia's ImmiAccount portal.^{[4]} Similar contracts were signed with the Swedish Ministry of Justice and the Royal Norwegian Ministry of Foreign Affairs, granting VFS Global responsibility for visa and residence permit services in dozens of countries worldwide.

=== 300 million visa applications milestone ===
In late 2024, the company announced it had processed a cumulative total of 300 million visa applications, crossing the 100 million mark in the preceding five years alone. The milestone highlighted the company's expansion trajectory despite global travel disruptions in earlier years. Over the course of its operations, it has also processed more than 140 million biometric enrollments and introduced 16 digital solutions to support eVisa platforms for 12 national governments.

== Criticism and controversies ==
Since its formation, VFS Global has attracted considerable criticism from governments, investigative journalists, and its clients. The company allegedly pressured visa applicants into purchasing premium services such as premium lounges. In 2019, the British Home Office was deluged by complaints from customers applying for visas through VFS Global, many of whom accused the company of "exploiting vulnerable applicants for profit." The majority of these applicants were from lower-income countries, and they "missed flights and were wrongly denied visas due to delays and administrative errors, including apparent failure to scan vital documents."

=== Data breaches ===
==== Initial breach and inaction ====
Between 2005 and 2007, a security flaw in the VFS Global application website for the British Foreign & Commonwealth Office resulted in many visa applications from India, Nigeria, and Russia becoming publicly accessible. Sensitive data stored in VFS Global's online service could be accessed by simply altering the VFS Global website's URL address. By doing so, anyone could access the company's visa applicant database, including their "stored passport numbers, names, addresses, and travel details." Although the security flaw had been known since December 2005, VFS Global addressed the issue only after media reports in May 2007.

==== UK government investigation ====
Following the data breach and media outcry, the UK Secretary of State for Foreign and Commonwealth Affairs appointed an independent investigator to uncover the reasons for the breach of security in the VFS Global online visa application website. The subsequent July 2007 report highlighted many failures by VFS Global, including that the company had failed to protect personal data to the levels required by the UK Data Protection Act. The report recommended that VFS Global online visa applications not be resumed for applications from India.

In November 2007, the UK Information Commissioner's Office announced that it had found the Foreign Office's contractual relationship with VFS Global to be in breach of its obligations under the Data Protection Act 1998. The Information Commissioner's Office required the Foreign Office to sign a statement that it would comply with the Data Protection Act and would not reopen the VFS Global UK visa online facility. As a result of this ruling, the Foreign Office reviewed its relationship with the company and briefly sought to significantly reduce its outsourced work, especially in the IT industry.

Following this incident, several governments criticized VFS Global's abilities and porous security protocols. "There's the accountability issue, the privacy issue and why are we outsourcing to a for-profit entity something that belongs in the security mandate?" asked Victor Wong, executive director of the Chinese Canadian National Council. Likewise, Liam Clifford, an immigration expert working for Global Visas, raised security concerns associated with VFS Global's operations: "Once you put this work in the hands of private companies overseas, you no longer have the same protection."

==== 2015 data breaches ====
VFS Global's data security again came under scrutiny in July 2015, when its online visa forms for Italy allowed any user to access the personal information of other applicants—including their date of birth, passport details and addresses—if they inputted the ID number of another person when logging into the system.

=== Monopoly allegations ===
VFS Global has been alleged to be a monopolistic enterprise operating in the visa outsourcing sector. Its alleged monopoly has led to issues related to prohibitive visa application prices and sparked concerns around centralised document handling and data security.

In June 2014, the South African Competition Commission investigated the company regarding allegations of market dominance in the visa support services market to foreign embassies. The commission recommended further investigations into the company. In a statement to the European Union parliament in July 2018, VFS Global denied that it operated as a monopoly, though its prepared statement did not cite any outsourcing companies with whom it was in competition for winning contracts.

=== Extortion allegations ===
In 2019, the Nigerian government's Portfolio Committee on Home Affairs accused VFS Global of "extorting" and "mistreating" vulnerable visa applicants in developing countries such as Nigeria. Additionally, the government placed the company under investigation for "allegations of abusive market dominance and unlawful tender procedures, resulting in excessive visa application prices and hidden fees."

=== English-only service in Canada ===
In March 2023, VFS Global faced criticism for requiring a French-speaking applicant for permanent residency in Canada to respond only in English, despite that it was legally obligated to provide services in both official languages of Canada. Quebec's Minister Jean-François Roberge called it "completely unacceptable" and said that "all citizens should be able to interact with the federal government in their language of choice". VFS Global did not apologize for the incident.

=== Upselling, data violations, and bribery ===
In May 2026, 14 media agencies, including Le Monde, Politico, The Indian Express, Semafor, News24, and Lighthouse Reports, published a joint investigation into VFS Global's commercial practices. The investigation drew on inspection and monitoring reports from the European Commission and 22 Schengen-zone countries obtained through Freedom of Information (FOI) requests, internal correspondence between EU member states, leaked European Commission diplomatic reports, financial statements, analysis of over 2,000 customer receipts, and interviews with dozens of current and former VFS employees in multiple countries.

VFS Global has built a profitable business around supplemental services, including SMS alerts, passport courier delivery, document scanning, premium lounges, and at-home biometric appointments priced between €80 and €3,500, sold alongside the mandatory service fee it is permitted to charge under the EU Visa Code. For many applicants, declining value-added services is made difficult. Current and former staff in several countries said employees were pressured to meet monthly sales targets, causing them to sometimes add services to bills without customer consent or to persist in pitching after applicants had declined. A former Delhi-based visa operations officer stated that staff received training in the "art of selling" and were "taught to catch the weak points of people," adding: "People think that we are from the embassy and whatever we are saying is right, especially those visiting for the first time." A current visa officer in Nigeria told investigators that bonuses for selling value-added services could amount to nearly twice a contractor's base monthly salary of approximately €125. Since contractors make up the majority of the VFS Global workforce, a former senior Nigeria-based officer described this as a situation that is "highly exploitative, everyone knows that." Five former employees confirmed that it was common for SMS and courier services to be added to customer bills without consent.

European governments' own monitoring reports corroborated these findings. Of 22 countries that produced inspection reports obtained by the investigation, four noted that value-added services were not always described to applicants as optional. A 2024 Czech Republic monitoring report found that VFS Global applied "excessive pressure to promote their additional services," leading applicants to believe that purchasing them would improve their chances of receiving a visa. Swedish authorities noted across successive years that VFS Global was "not always explicit that the value-added services are optional," and in 2023 received complaints from applicants in India who said they had been forced to buy premium lounge access and SMS services. Latvia reported in 2023 that while premium appointments in Istanbul were available for purchase, no slots were available when selecting the standard free service, effectively making the paid option the only accessible one. A 2022 European Commission inspection found that in Senegal, VFS Global "systematically" made additional appointment slots available for an extra fee under its contract with the Italian consulate, in breach of EU regulations that prohibit the sale of appointment slots.

Financial analysis of VFS Global's consolidated statements in Luxembourg showed that between 2017 and 2024, the company more than quadrupled its operating profits, from 36 million to 161 million Swiss francs, while the number of applications it processed rose by only 15 percent over the same period, growth the company consistently attributed to value-added service sales. An analysis of over 2,000 receipts from Swedish embassy FOI requests covering 16 countries found that value-added services accounted for an average of 30 percent of VFS Global's revenue, with SMS notifications alone making up over 90 percent of payments in Kenya, a market where former staff said such fees were routinely added without applicant consent. Accounts from VFS Global's Indian subsidiary OneVasco, a "visa concierge" chain that operates offices adjacent to VFS Global application centres, showed pre-tax profit margins of 53 percent in 2024 and 70 percent in 2023. One French diplomat told investigators they were aware of the "confusion" that the proximity of OneVasco offices had created among applicants, and said an action plan had been requested from VFS Global to clearly separate the two operations. Former VFS Global employees also told investigators that pressure to sell value-added services intensified following Blackstone's acquisition of a 75 percent stake in the company in October 2021, with the company's Dubai headquarters demanding weekly sales reports and issuing threats to teams that fell behind targets.

The investigation also documented 21 instances of VFS Global failing to handle personal data in accordance with the EU's General Data Protection Regulation (GDPR), identified across the internal monitoring reports. In 2022, Luxembourg reported that VFS Global had transported applicants' biometric data across the city on an unencrypted compact disc; Norway found that some VFS Global centres failed to delete data within legal deadlines every year between 2021 and 2024; and Sweden identified a "lack of knowledge among staff when it comes to GDPR." Experts consulted for the investigation described these failures as "manifestly serious violations." Five EU countries additionally reported that bots or external agents were block-booking free appointment slots and reselling them, with security experts finding VFS Global's anti-bot measures inadequate to address the problem given the profitability of scalping operations. Separately, undercover footage obtained by investigators showed a VFS Global staff member in the Democratic Republic of Congo claiming to guarantee visa approvals in exchange for a payment above the standard application fee.

Despite these documented failures, VFS Global faced limited consequences. EU governments acknowledged the difficulty of holding the company to account given its dominant market position and the reduced consular staffing that outsourcing has produced. A 2022 Luxembourg review noted that VFS Global's dominant position in India made it "difficult sometimes to ensure the quality of service needed by the Embassy," and a Swiss delegation stated it had "no other option to see VFS as a partner" given it could not process applications at that volume itself. The Czech Republic reported it had raised issues with the company "repeatedly" but with only "temporary impact," with conduct eventually deteriorating again. When approached with the investigation's findings, the European Commission announced it was launching a "comprehensive study" on the outsourcing of visa services "with a view to drawing up options to prevent system abuses."

VFS Global rejected the investigation's findings, stating it operated a "zero tolerance approach to any coercion or misrepresentation" and that applicants were "clearly informed that these services are optional, do not influence visa decisions or processing times, and are priced transparently." The company further stated that its financial growth reflected "a legitimate structural shift in its business model" and denied that Blackstone's investment had increased the focus on value-added service sales. Blackstone did not respond to requests for comment.
