= Alexander Kerr (disambiguation) =

Alexander Kerr (1892–1964) was an English marine engineer and wholesale newsagent known for his service in the Imperial Trans-Antarctic Expedition.

Alexander Kerr may also refer to:

- Alexander Kerr (banker) (1838–1909), Scottish banker
- Alexander Kerr (professor) (born 1970), American violinist
- Alexander Robert Kerr (1770–1831), Royal Navy officer

== See also ==
- Alex Kerr (disambiguation)
