= Thomas Crawford of Jordanhill =

Crawford's Grave Marker

Captain Thomas Crawford or Thomas Craufurd (1530–1603) of Jordanhill (an estate in the West End of Glasgow, part of which is now a college and hospital near Victoria Park) was a trusted confidant of Henry Stuart, Lord Darnley, husband of Mary, Queen of Scots and a retainer of the Matthew Stewart, 4th Earl of Lennox (Darnley's father). He famously planned the assault and led a small force of 150 men in 1571 that scaled the cliffs and embattlements to expel the castle garrison loyal to Catholic Queen Mary from Dumbarton Castle. Six years later, he became Provost of Glasgow, establishing a bursary for a student at the university and saving the cathedral from destruction.

== Family ==
Thomas married first, Marion, daughter of Sir John Colquhoun of Luss, widow of Robert, Master of Boyd. They had a daughter:

1. Marion, m. Sir Robert Fairlie of Fairlie

He married second, Janet, eldest daughter of Robert Ker of Kersland (the elder). They had issue:

1. Daniel, who assumed the name of his mother's family to become Ker of Kersland.
2. Hew
3. Susanna

== Early career ==
Thomas Crawford was born about 1530, a son of Lawrence Crawford of Kilbirnie Place near Kilbirnie in what is now North Ayrshire. As youngest of six sons, his career options were open, and he became a professional soldier.

In 1547, he was at the Battle of Pinkie Cleugh, but had the misfortune of being taken prisoner, and was detained till ransomed. In 1550, he went to France and entered the service of King Henry II as one of the Gens d’Armes, under the command of the Earl of Arran.

Thomas Crawford acquired the land and title of Jordanhill from Bartholemew Montgomerie (the chaplain of Drumry) following his return to Scotland from France with Mary, Queen of Scots in either 1560 or 1562. To secure this position, Crawford became a retainer of the 4th Earl of Lennox, grandfather of the future James VI. Ultimately, he became the Earl's deputy, second only to the Earl's Chamberlain, John Cunningham of Drumquhassle. He notability increased in 1569 following the murder of Queen Mary's husband, Lord Darnley, by suspected agents of the Queen. William Maitland of Lethington (and Sir James Balfour) were publicly accused of Darnley's murder by Crawford; Balfour escaped, but Lethington was imprisoned and was released by William Kirkcaldy of Grange, commander in Edinburgh Castle, which subsequently became the fortress of Mary's cause during the Lang Siege in the ensuing civil war.

== Assault on Dumbarton Castle ==
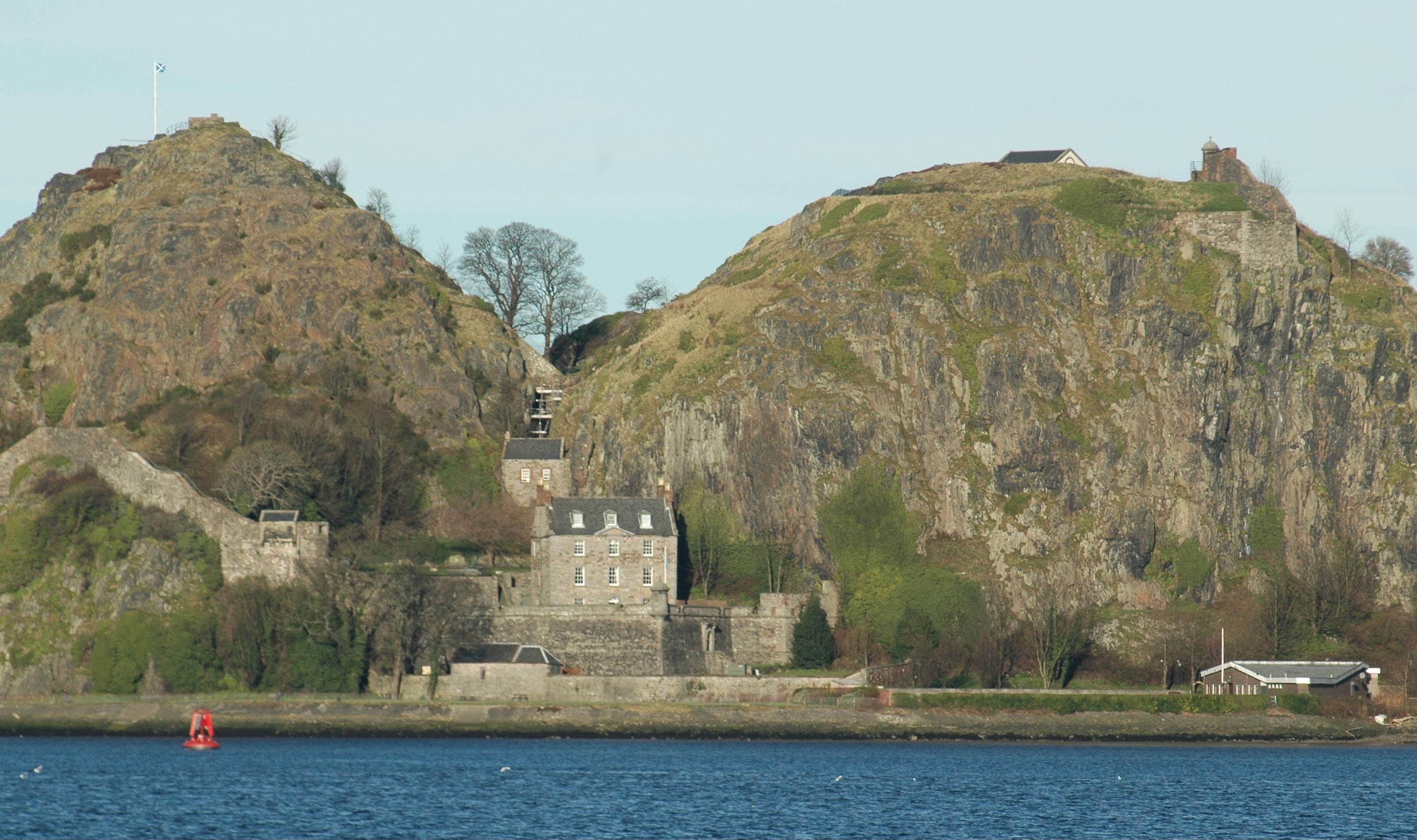
Dumbarton Castle seen from across the River Clyde

Crawford planned the assault and led a force of 150 men in the early hours of 2 April 1571 that scaled the cliffs and embattlements to expel the castle garrison loyal to Catholic Queen Mary from Dumbarton Castle.

In this task he was assisted by John Cunningham of Drumquhassle, Matthew Douglas of Mains (both also retainers of the Earl of Lennox) and a traitor from the castle garrison called Robertson. He was once warden of the castle, knew the topography of the rock well and in particular, knew how it could be scaled. It seems that while in the service of the Governor, his wife was accused of theft and publicly flogged. This episode appears to have provoked Robertson to leave Queen's supporters in the castle and offer his services to the King's supporters, initially to Robert Douglas, who introduced him to Drumquassle.

A truce between supporters of the King and supporters of the Queen expired on 1 April 1571. That evening, Crawford set out from Glasgow with Robertson and a company of men. He had sent a small advance group of horsemen ahead of him to stop all wayfarers (who might betray the mission), and he made his way to an agreed meeting place within a mile of the castle, (Dumbuck) where he was joined by Drumquhassle and Captain Hume.

Here he equipped the soldiers with ropes and scaling ladders. The night was foggy and the escalade relied upon stealth, because the number of ladders that could be employed was limited. On the first attempt, the ladders slipped while the soldiers were on them; if the watch of the garrison had been more aware of the danger, the noise could have given warning of the attack and the castle might have been successfully defended. However, no alarm was raised. On the second attempt, the ladders were fixed more securely, and, their 'craws' or steel hooks being lodged firmly into the crevices of the rock. The leaders of the party then took hold of a small intermediate ledge where an ash tree was growing. They attached their ropes to the tree and pulled up the remainder of their company. However, they were still only halfway to the base of the curtain wall.

They positioned their ladders again and began scaling the next stage. At this point, one of the soldiers climbing a ladder was seized with a fit. In his convulsion, he gripped the ladder so firmly and in such a way that no others could pass by him or remove him. Crawford's solution to this problem was to tie the unfortunate soldier to the ladder and turn it round (with the man suspended beneath it), so the passage was clear again. All-but-one of the party thus reached the bottom of the garrison wall, a precarious and narrow ledge. Crawford's ensign and two other soldiers scaled the wall and then came under attack by three guards until they were joined by the rest of the party. The wall (which was in poor repair) collapsed, opening a breach through which Crawford's men were able to rush in, shouting, "A Darnley, a Darnley!" (Crawford's watchword).

The wall was breached on the north east side of the castle where it is highest and therefore presumed to be the least well guarded. The eastern peak of the rock (The Beak) was quickly gained, and the cannon there was captured and turned on the garrison, who attempted very little resistance, preferring to escape rather than fight back. The castle governor (Fleming) managed to escape through the postern gate which opened onto the River Clyde and reached Argyllshire. Key supporters of Queen Mary found within the castle included de Verac, the French ambassador, who was allowed to go free, but was subsequently caught aiding the Queen's supporters in Edinburgh Castle. John Hamilton, Archbishop of St Andrews was also found in the castle wearing items of armour (a mail shirt and helmet). The wife of the governor (Lady Fleming) was also detained, but was permitted to go free with her possessions. Hamilton was hanged within a matter of days at Stirling Castle. As important as the arrest of key people was the capture of documents, including some implicating Queen Mary with Thomas Howard, 4th Duke of Norfolk and the Ridolfi plot.

An Act of Parliament was passed on 28 August 1571 in favour of "Johnne Cuningham of Drumquhassel, Matho Dowglas of Manys, Captain Thomas Crawford of Jordanhill, and others takeris of the Castell of Dumbartane," discharging them of any criminal or civil liabilities incurred in the recapture of the castle.

== Subsequent life ==
Two years later, he advised on operations to end the siege of Edinburgh Castle. This eliminated the final barrier to a reunification of Scotland under Queen Mary's son, Protestant King James, in 1573.

In 1579 the Hamilton family were suppressed for their support for Queen Mary, and for the murders of Regent Moray and Regent Lennox. They fortified their houses and castles including Craignethan Castle and the Castle of Hamilton (Cadzow Castle). Cadzow was bombarded by Michael Gardiner, and fell on 19 May 1579. The castle was slighted by Captain Thomas Crawford, who received £455 Scots for the work. Rumours reached England that Crawford had been injured at Hamilton.

His lineage became known as Crawford of Jordanhill, his estate in the present-day suburbs of Glasgow, of which he was made provost in 1577.

He was also the first person to provide a bursary out of his own wealth at Glasgow University, (16 bolls of oatmeal from the mill at Partick) - an amount large enough to completely support one student.

It was while Crawford held the office of Provost that Glasgow Cathedral was threatened with destruction (as part of the religious unrest during the Reformation). According to one story, it was Crawford who saved the medieval building. He is reported to have said to those who were eager for its demolition, and pressing him to give permission for their action:-

"I am for pu'ing doon the auld kirk, but no till we ha'e first built a new ane"
(I am in favour of pulling down the old church, but not until we have first built a new one).

Crawford retired to his childhood home of Kilbirnie Place, where he died on 3 January 1603 and is entombed with his wife Janet Ker of Kerlsand at Kilbirnie Auld Kirk. The family sold the estate in 1750.
