= Robert Ker of Kersland =

Presbyterian leader (1634–1680)

Personal details
- Born: 1634 Kersland, Dalry
- Died: 14 November 1680 Utrecht
- Denomination: Presbyterian
- Spouse: Barbara Montgomery

Robert Ker (the younger) (1634–1680) known as Robert Ker of Kersland was a Covenanter. He sympathised with the insurgents who fought at Rullion Green and consequently was declared a rebel and his lands became forfeit. He escaped to Holland but following his wife home on business he was captured while visiting her in her sick-bed in Edinburgh. He spent many years in various jails. He is remembered by Christian historians and biographers such as Wodrow and Howie as one who suffered for the Presbyterian cause in Scotland.

== Life ==
Robert Ker of Kersland took a decided part, early in life, with the Covenanters; and, from his inflexible integrity, enjoyed the confidence of the party to a considerable degree. On 28 November 1666, he was one of the small body of horse who, under William Muir of Caldwell assembled at Chitterflat, in the parish of Beith, with a view to join Colonel Wallace previous to the battle of Pentland. He was indicted for treason, and his estate was given to General Drummond; and a mortgage right, held by Kersland, for 13,000 marks, over the lands of Overtown, part of the estate of Robert Montgomerie of Hazelhead, in Beith, was given to William Blair of that Ilk, who, as the king's donator, was preferred to the widow of Hazlehead, in a question with the tenant. [Morris's Dictionary] Kersland fled to Holland, but returned privately in 1669.

Robert Ker of Kersland was a fellow-prisoner in Stirling with Baillie of Jerviswood in August 1676. Ker had been in various jails since 1670. After Rullion Green he escaped to Utrecht, whence he returned in the end of 1669 to see his estate enjoyed by General Drummond, and to fall into the hands of the Government through the treachery of Robert Cannon of Mardrogat, the informer.

== Captured while visiting his ill wife ==
He was meanly betrayed by a pretended friend, and apprehended while in his lady's bed-chamber in Edinburgh. He was nearly three months prisoner in Edinburgh; and from there was sent to Dumbarton Castle, where he continued near a year and a half. Then, he was ordered to Aberdeen, where he was kept close prisoner, without fire, for three months space in the cold winter season. From Aberdeen he was brought south to Stirling Castle, where he continued some years; and then was a second time returned to Dumbarton, where he continued till October 1677. The Council then confined him to Irvine, and allowed him some time to transport himself and his family, then at Glasgow, to that place.

== Withdrawal to Utrecht and death ==
The sufferings of his family were also grievous. In 1677 his punishment was relaxed and liberty allowed to him. He was once more taken and thrown into Glasgow Tolbooth, from which he was rescued by the people, when a great fire broke out in Glasgow. After consoling himself with the society and sermons of the hill-preachers till August 1678, he saw the prudence of withdrawing to Utrecht, where he died in 1680.

== After the revolution ==
At the Revolution, the forfeiture was rescinded, and his estate restored. His eldest son, Robert, having died without issue, he was succeeded by his second son, Major Daniel Ker.

== Family ==
Robert Ker (the younger), the subject of this article, was a descendant of Robert Ker (the elder). Captain Thomas Crawfurd of Jordanhill (who surprised the castle of Dumbarton in 1571) married Janet, heiress of Robert Ker of Kersland (the elder), the representative of a very ancient family in Ayrshire. (Crawfurd's Renfrew, 71.) His eldest son, Daniel, succeeded to the title and estate of Kersland, and was succeeded by his son Hugh. (Inq. Retor. Renfrew, 68, 209; Ayr, 179, 238.) Hugh was alive in 1644, (Act. Pari. Scot. vi. 133,) and was either the father, or (which is more probable) the grandfather of Robert Ker of Kersland (the younger) who forfeited his estates after the battle of Pentland.

Ker married Barbara Montgomery as her second husband. Her first husband had been Alan Dunlop, provost of Irvine. After Ker's death his widow, Lady Carsland is known to have held prayer meeting in her house in Holland. Kersland in the hurry and confusion of his affairs, after the meeting at Chitterflat, executed a holograph deed of settlement, making an eventual provision of 40,000 Scots to his daughters; but this was found not to be positive debt, in a question between Margaret Ker and her sister, decided February 8, 1715. Robert Ker and Barbara had two sons:

- Robert, his eldest son having (died without issue)
- Major Daniel Ker, his second son killed at the battle of Steinkirk in 1692

Besides these two sons, he had four daughters:

- Jean, married to Major William Borthwick of Johnstonburn;
- Margaret, (Meg) married to Mr Thomas Binning, minister of Leshmahagow;
- Anna, married to the government spy John Crawfurd, alias John Ker;
- Elizabeth, married to Alexander Poterfield, surgeon in Glasgow.

== Legacy ==
There is preserved a draught of a petition to the Privy Council, in which the petitioner, after mentioning that he had been confined for five years in different prisons, says, "in the very coldest of this season, and in such a time when some of them were wrestling under heavy and sad sickness, others enduring pains of the stone-gravel so excessive as cannot be expressed, were my thus pained children extruded out of the castle with all the rest, except one daughter, who, with myself and tender wife, and one servant, were thrust up to another room, that is known to be intolerable for smoke and cold." The petition concludes with a request for "a change of imprisonment to Edinburgh castle," with the view of having an operation performed on the child afflicted with the stone. The name of the petitioner has been carefully deleted, but on a narrow inspection appears to be "Robert Ker of Kersland," prisoner in the "castle of Stirling." The date, which has been altered, was originally 1675. In a note on the back of the petition, in a different handwriting, and apparently Kersland's, the petitioner signifies that, after the draught was made, he hesitated as to its being his duty to present it, "being diffident of treating or tampering with these so dreadfully-given-up men." (MSS. in Adv. Lib. Jac. V. 2, 26, art. 30.) A letter, which appears to be written by the same person to Macward, is dated, "From my closs prison at Stirling castle, the 31st Dec. 1673." The writer says, "though I know not if Forbes (Colonel Wallace) be there, yet about a week ago I wrote to him, which was my second. I wrote also to the good old provost." He mentions that he had been visited by Mr. Thomas Forrester, curate of Alva, "to whose recantation my Rob. Jea. and Meg, with a great gathering of honest people, were auditors." (MSS. ut supra, Jac. V. i. 26, art. 28.)

Robert Ker's sword, inkkorn, and a small jar belonging to him, were (at the time of the New Statistical Account) still preserved. The sword was a real Andrew Ferrara, and lacked the sheath. The inkhorn was a small circular horn tube, about five inches in length having a small bulb at one extremity for containing the ink. The slender part was hollow, and contained a receptacle for the pens. The jar was rather a curious article. These relics, at the seizure of the effects of Kersland, were taken by a servant of the family, who bequeathed them to his nephew, the late Hugh Brown, piper, Dairy, a worthy who, had he lived in the days of Habbie Simpson, would have proved a formidable rival to the far-famed piper of Kilbarchan Brown left them to Mr Andrew Crawford, Courthill, Dairy.
