= Robert Ker =

Robert Ker may refer to:

- Robert Ker, 1st Earl of Roxburghe (c. 1570–1650), Scottish nobleman
- Robert Ker of Kersland (1634–1680), Scottish Covenanter
- Robert Ker, 3rd Earl of Roxburghe (c. 1658–1682), Scottish nobleman
- Robert Ker, 4th Earl of Roxburghe (c. 1677–1696), Scottish nobleman
- Robert Ker, 2nd Duke of Roxburghe (c. 1709–1755), Scottish nobleman
- Robert Ker (auditor general) (1824–1879), auditor general of the Colony and then the Province of British Columbia

== See also ==
- Robert Kerr (disambiguation)
- Robert Ker Porter
