= Robert Kerr =

Robert Kerr may refer to:

== Sportsmen ==
- Robert Kerr (Australian footballer) (born 1967), former Australian rules footballer
- Robert Kerr (athlete) (1882–1963), Canadian athlete & Olympic medalist
- Robbie Kerr (racing driver) (born 1979), English racing driver
- Robbie Kerr (Australian cricketer) (born 1961)
- Robbie Kerr (New Zealand cricketer) (born 1966)
- Bob Kerr (cricket official) (1939–2007), former head of the Irish Cricket Union
- Bob Kerr (Australian footballer) (1875–1943), Australian rules footballer

== Politicians and noblemen ==
- Robert A. Kerr (died 1912), American politician and delegate; member of the Texas House of Representatives
- Robert S. Kerr (1896–1963), American politician; Governor and Senator from Oklahoma
- Robert S. Kerr III (born 1950), American politician; Lieutenant Governor of Oklahoma
- Robert John Kerr (1943–1997), Northern Irish loyalist
- Robert Kerr, 1st Marquess of Lothian (1636–1703), Scottish nobleman
- Robert Kerr, 2nd Earl of Lothian (died 1624), Scottish nobleman
- Lord Robert Kerr (died 1746), Scottish nobleman
- Robert Kerr, 1st Earl of Ancram (c. 1578–1654), Scottish nobleman, politician and writer
- Robert M. Kerr (1932-2006), American politician; member of the Oklahoma Senate
- Robert Kerr (Canadian politician) (1929-2010), Canadian politician and businessman

== Others ==
- Robert Kerr (architect) (1823–1904), British architect and writer
- Robert Kerr (doctor), Canadian doctor, Indian Department officer and judge, see William Johnson Kerr
- Robert Kerr (writer) (1757–1813), Scottish writer
- Robert P. Kerr (1892–1960), film director
- Robert S. Kerr (bishop) (1917–1988), bishop of the Episcopal Diocese of Vermont
- Robert Kerr (missionary) (died 1918), British physician, missionary, judge, and author
- Robert Malcolm Kerr (1821–1902), British judge
- Bob Kerr (author and artist) (born 1951), New Zealand author, illustrator and artist
- Bobby Kerr (businessman) (born 1960), Irish businessman, CEO Insomnia Coffee
- Bob Kerr (musician) (born 1940), English comic musician; member of the Bonzo Dog Doo-Dah Band, The New Vaudeville Band and Bob Kerr's Whoopie Band
- Bob Kerr (radio presenter) (died 2003), CBC radio classical music presenter, see List of Canadian Broadcasting Corporation personalities

== See also ==
- Robert Ker (disambiguation)
- Bobby Kerr (disambiguation)
- Robert Carr (disambiguation)
