= Michael Kerr =

Michael, Mick or Mike Kerr may refer to:

- Michael Kerr (judge) (1921–2002), British jurist, lawyer and author
- Michael Kerr, 13th Marquess of Lothian (1945–2024), known as Michael Ancram, United Kingdom politician and MP
- Michael C. Kerr (1827–1876), American legislator and Speaker of the US House of Representatives
- Michael Kerr (rugby union) (born 1974), German rugby union international
- T. Michael Kerr (born 1962), American politician
- Mick Kerr (1934–2021), Tyrone Gaelic footballer
- Mike Kerr, lead singer and bassist of the English rock duo Royal Blood
