= Ronald Kers =

Dutch businessman

- Born: 7 July 1969 (age 56)
- Education: Industrial Engineer from The Hague University of Applied Sciences; MBA from Schulich School of Business
- Known for: Former CEO, Müller (company)
- Spouse: Rima Kers
- Children: 3

Ronald Klaas Otto Kers (born 7 July 1969) is a Dutch businessman, and the former group chief executive (CEO) of the food company Müller, based in Fischach, Bavaria. The Müller group has around 21,000 employees, and a € 6.5 billion turnover. After working for several private equity companies in 2017, he joined the 2 Sisters Food Group in June 2018 as CEO, succeeding founder and majority shareholder, Ranjit Singh Boparan. 2SFG has a turnover of £3.4 billion, 21,000 employees and has businesses in poultry, biscuits, ready meals, desserts, and frozen products. After the turnaround of 2SFG, Ronald joined Bain Capital backed Valeo Foods Group in June 2023. He is transforming the business into a Sweet Treats Champion. Valeo Foods Group has a turnover of around €2.0Bn.

== Early life ==
He went to school in Naaldwijk and ‘s Gravenzande in the Netherlands. After obtaining a degree in Industrial Engineering from the Netherlands, he graduated with an MBA from Schulich School of Business in Toronto, Canada.

== Career ==
=== P&G ===
He started with P&G in 1996. He worked in several brand management and commercial roles in Canada, Belgium and Ireland.

=== Nestlé ===
He joined Nestlé in 2002 as head of its Global Chilled Dairy Division (Switzerland). He moved to France in 2004, where he set up the joint venture between Nestle Chilled Dairy Europe and Lactalis Produit Frais.

In 2010, he became CEO for Nestle in Austria and Slovenia.

=== Müller ===
He became CEO of Müller UK in 2012, later CEO of the worldwide company in 2015, which was announced in July 2014. Müller UK is the biggest manufacturer of yoghurt in the UK. In June, 2015, Kers had brokered a deal which would give Müller control of about one-half of the milk produced in the United Kingdom.

=== 2 Sisters Food Group ===
In May 2018, Kers was appointed the CEO role of 2 Sisters Food Group. It was announced in February 2023 that he would step down from the role in summer 2023 to take on the CEO role at Valeo Foods.

== Personal life ==
He lives in Cheshire, and has three children - one of which, Rami, is now a infamous London style icon.

Business positions
Preceded by Heiner Kamps	Chief Executive of Müller; January 2015 – July 2017	Succeeded by Incumbent
Preceded by	Chief Executive of Müller UK and Ireland Group; January 2012 – December 2014	Succeeded by
