= Keir (disambiguation) =

Keir is a given name and surname of Gaelic and Scottish origin.

Keir or KEIR may also refer to:

- Keir, Dumfries and Galloway, Scotland, a civil parish
- Keir House, Stirling, Scotland
- KNBL, a radio station (1260 AM) licensed to serve Idaho Falls, Idaho, United States, which held the call sign KEIR from 2014 to 2018

== See also ==
- Kier (disambiguation)
