= William Kerr =

William Kerr is the name of:

== Politics and nobility ==
- William Kerr, 1st Earl of Lothian (c. 1605–1675), Scottish nobleman
- William Kerr, 2nd Marquess of Lothian (1661–1722), Scottish peer and soldier
- William Kerr, 3rd Marquess of Lothian (c. 1690–1767), Scottish nobleman
- William Kerr, 4th Marquess of Lothian (1710–1775), also a Member of Parliament
- William Kerr, 5th Marquess of Lothian (1737–1815), British soldier and peer
- William Kerr, 6th Marquess of Lothian (1763–1824), son of William Kerr, 5th Marquess of Lothian
- Sir William Kerr, 3rd Baronet (died 1716), one of the Scottish representatives to the first Parliament of Great Britain
- Sir William Kerr, 4th Baronet (died 1741), of the Kerr baronets
- Sir William Kerr, 6th Baronet (died 1755), of the Kerr baronets
- William Johnson Kerr (1787–1845), political figure in Upper Canada
- William G. Kerr (c. 1814–1861), mayor of Hamilton, Ontario, Canada
- William Kerr (Canadian politician) (1836–1906), Canadian politician
- William Franklin Kerr (1876–1968), journalist and politician in Saskatchewan, Canada
- William Kerr (mayor) (1809–1853), mayor of Pittsburgh, Pennsylvania

== Military ==
- William Kerr (Royal Navy officer) (fl. 1690–1706), British admiral
- William Munro Kerr (1876–1959), British admiral
- William Kerr (British Army officer, died 1741), British Army officer, MP for Aberdeen Burghs and Dysart Burghs
- William Alexander Kerr (1831–1919), Scottish recipient of the Victoria Cross

== Sports ==
- William Kerr (American football) (1914–2005), American football and wrestling coach
- Bill Kerr (footballer) (1882–1911), Australian rules footballer
- Willie Kerr, Scottish footballer
- Billy Kerr (1945–2012), Irish cyclist
- William Kerr (baseball), co-owner of the Pittsburgh Pirates baseball team
- Will Kerr (born 1982), American mixed martial artist
- Bud Kerr (1916–1964), American football player and coach

== Other ==
- William Kerr (gardener) (died 1814), collector of plants in East Asia
- William Kerr (journalist) (1812–1859), Scottish-Australian journalist, founder of The Argus
- William Kerr (architect) (1836–1911), Irish-American architect
- William Kerr (bishop) (1873–1960), Irish Anglican bishop
- William Jasper Kerr (1863–1947), president of Oregon State University, 1907–1932
- William Alexander Robb Kerr (1875–1945), Canadian academic and president of the University of Alberta
- William R. Kerr, professor at Harvard Business School
- Bill Kerr (1922–2014), South African-born Australian actor
- Will Kerr (police officer), British chief constable

== See also ==
- William Ker (disambiguation)
