= George Kerr =

George Kerr may refer to:

== Politics ==
- George Albert Kerr (1924–2007), Canadian politician
- George H. Kerr (1911–1992), United States diplomat
- George Kerr (Australian politician) (1853–1930), Australian politician, grazier, and blacksmith
- George Kerr (New Brunswick politician) (1805–?), Scottish lawyer and political figure in New Brunswick
- George Kerr, a New Zealand political candidate who stood in the electorate of Marlborough 11 times
- George Kerr (Ontario politician) (1849–1913), Ontario merchant and political figure
- George Kerr (UK politician) (died 1942), Scottish trade unionist and politician

== Sports ==
- George Kerr (American football, born 1894) (1894–1980), American football player for the Cleveland Tigers and New York
- George Kerr (American football, born 1919) (1919–1983), American football player for Boston College
- George Kerr (footballer) (born 1943), former manager of Lincoln City, Grimsby Town, and Rotherham United football clubs
- George Kerr (judoka) (born 1937), Scottish judo expert
- George Kerr (runner) (1937–2012), Jamaican athlete
- George Kerr (tennis) (1860–?), Scottish tennis player and physician
- George J. Kerr (1867–1954), Irish tennis player and coach

== Other ==
- George F. Kerr (1918–1996), English writer in Australia
- George Fraser Kerr (1895–1929), Canadian recipient of the Victoria Cross
- George Kerr (musician), record producer who produced The Whatnauts, The Manhattans, and The O'Jays

== See also ==
- Kerr (surname)
