= John G. Kerr =

John G. Kerr may refer to:

- John Glasgow Kerr (1824–1901), American physician and medical missionary
- John Graham Kerr (1869–1957), Scottish embryologist and Member of Parliament

== See also ==
- John Kerr (disambiguation)
