= Müller (company) =

German food company

Unternehmensgruppe Theo Müller S.e.c.s.

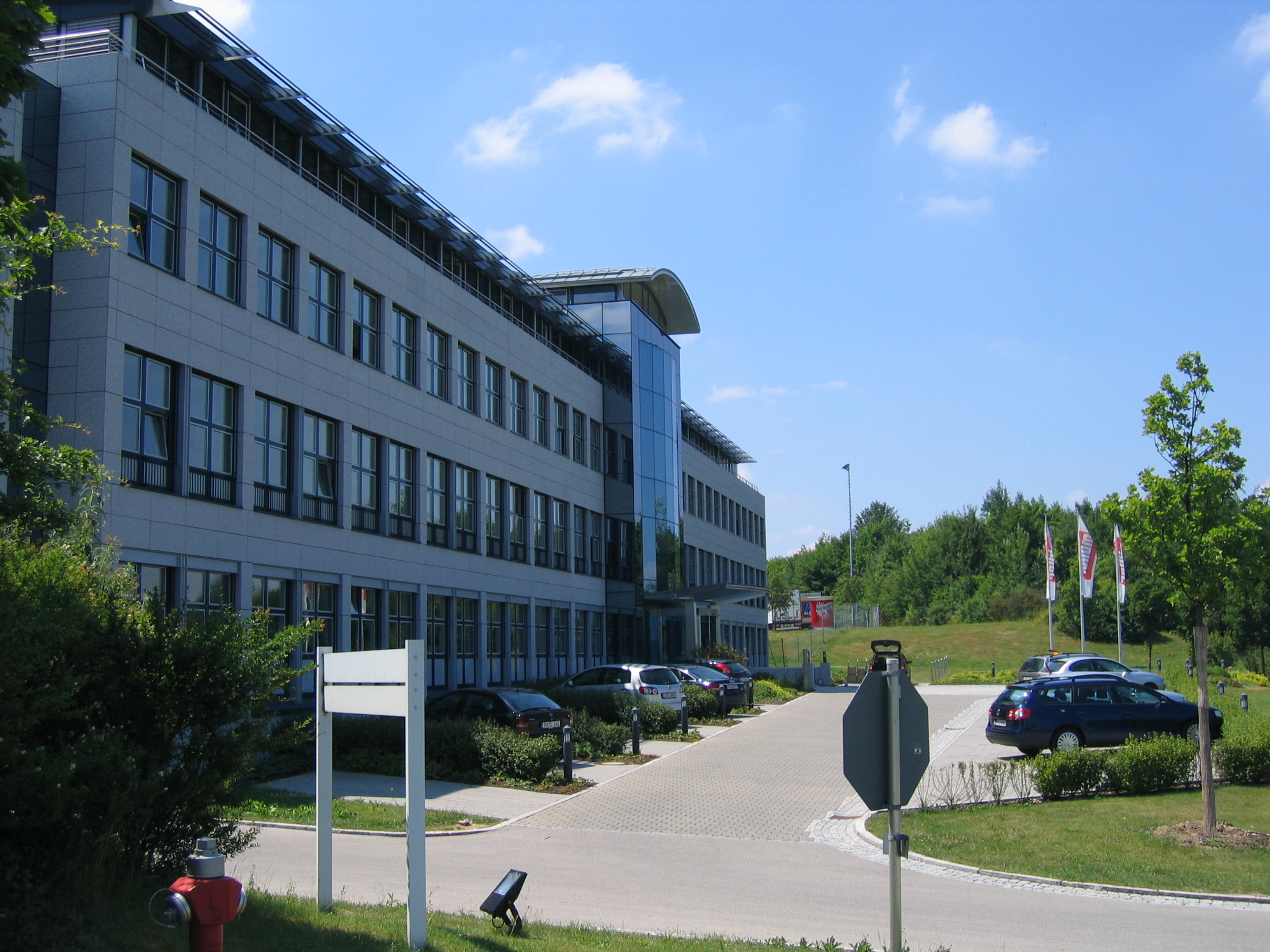
- Headquarters of the Müller Group
- Trade name: Müller
- Company type: Private
- Industry: Food
- Founded: 1896; 130 years ago
- Headquarters: Fischach, Bavaria, Germany
- Key people: Werner Stegmüller (Chief executive officer)
- Products: Dairy
- Revenue: €5.7 billion (2019)
- Owner: Theo Müller
- Number of employees: 27,500 (2019)
- Subsidiaries: Müller Milk & Ingredients; Culina Group
- Website: muellergroup.com

Müller is a German company producing dairy products, with headquarters in Fischach in the German state of Bavaria. Aside from its German home market, Müller is also active on various markets around Europe and beyond. It is, for example, one of the best selling yogurt brands in the United Kingdom.

The company achieved a turnover of €5.7 billion in 2019 and has more than 27,500 employees.

== History ==
The Müller company was founded in 1896 in Aretsried, Bavaria. In 1971, the founder's grandson Theo Müller took over as the sole owner.

Müller was the main shirt sponsor for English football club Aston Villa as part of a two-year deal from 1993 until 1995, during which time they won the Football League Cup. The sponsorship ended when the club accepted a sponsorship offer from AST Research. The American singer Nicole Scherzinger has appeared in Müller adverts.

Through a joint venture with PepsiCo's Quaker Foods division, Müller entered the market in the United States in August 2012. The company's plant in the United States opened in Batavia, New York, in June 2013, and was the distribution hub for the United States. However, the company announced in December 2015 that it would close the plant. The plant reopened in July 2017, under new ownership by Alpina Foods, but closed down again in January 2019.

Müller condemned animal abuse that was uncovered in September 2024 at one of the farms supplying the company.

== Operations ==
The Müller group is one of the largest dairy groups in the world, with an estimated turnover in the dairy sector of around €3.3 billion (2013). In total, the group generates annual sales of around €5.7 billion (2019) and employs around 27,500 people worldwide (2019).

=== Dairy brands ===
The group includes a number of companies operating under the Müller name, including the original Molkerei Alois Müller GmbH & Co. KG and Müller Dairy (U.K.). It is best known for its range of yogurts, including the trademark 'Müller Corner', and fresh milk based drinks.

The group includes subsidiaries with independent brands such as Müller, Müller Wiseman, Müller Quaker Dairy, Weihenstephan, Sachsenmilch and Käserei Loose. Private labels and basic dairy products such as butter, UHT milk, lactose powder and whey protein complete the portfolio.

In addition to the companies operating under the Müller name, the group wholly or partly owns the Molkerei Weihenstephan, Sachsenmilch and Käserei Loose dairy companies in Germany, the Mlékárna Pragolaktos dairy in the Czech Republic, and Müller Milk & Ingredients in the United Kingdom.

=== Convenience foods ===
Since 2011, the group has also included HK Food, which is one of Germany's leading manufacturers of convenience foods. Its product range includes chilled delicatessen salads, sauces and fish specialities from the Homann, Nadler, Livio and other brands of the Homann Group. The branch business from Nordsee was part of HK Food until October 2018.

=== Production sites ===
In Germany, beside the group headquarters in Fischach which also houses the Molkerei Alois Müller production plant, the group also operates significant production sites in Freising (Molkerei Weihenstephan), Leppersdorf (Sachsenmilch and Käserei Loose), Market Drayton (Müller Dairy (U.K.), and Prague (Mlékárna Pragolaktos).

The group had twenty five production sites worldwide by February 2017.

=== Sales offices and exports ===
The company has sales offices in Italy, the Netherlands, Romania, Slovakia and Hong Kong. Müller also exports fresh dairy products of the Müller brand to Bosnia and Herzegovina, Ireland, Croatia, Luxembourg, Austria, Russia, Slovenia, Hungary and the United Arab Emirates.

=== Support services ===
In addition to the milk processing subsidiaries, it also owns a number of ancillary marketing and transport companies. The group includes the packaging company Optipack, the logistics company Culina Group, and Müller Naturfarm.

== Product ranges ==
Müller produces a substantial number of popular yogurt brands, including Müllerlight, Müllerice, Yogz and Müller Corner.

- Müller FrütUp (German: Froop) is a vanilla yogurt topped with fruit mousse.
- Müller Corner (German: Joghurt mit der Ecke, lit. Yogurt with the Corner), launched in the 1980s, is a range of yogurts. There are three main varieties: Fruit, Healthy Balance and Crunch!. Within each of these divisions, a number of flavours are produced, for instance Fruit Corners are available in Blackberry & Raspberry, Blueberry, Cherry, Peach & Apricot, Raspberry and Strawberry flavours. The name "corner" is in reference to the design of the product. In many of the varieties, the yogurt is plain and unflavoured. It comes with an attached portion of 'flavour', fruit compote for example, to add to the plain yogurt.
- Müller Rice (German: Müller Milchreis), launched in 1980, is a creamy rice pudding based snack usually containing an additional flavoured sauce, such as apple, raspberry or caramel. Müller Rice is sold in a plastic pot, and can be eaten cold or heated in a microwave oven. It is marketed as being a healthy, filling and energy providing snack. Only available in Germany until 1989, it was introduced to the United Kingdom and is now widely available.
- Müllerlight is a brand of low fat yogurt. Popular flavours include strawberry, toffee and apricot.
- Müller Little Stars are aimed at young children and marketed as being made of very few ingredients and being 100% natural.
- Müller Vitality is a range of probiotic yogurts and yogurt drinks.
- Müller Amore is a luxury yogurt range containing Greek honey.
- Milk & More milkman household delivery of Müller Milk & Ingredients products including Müller Milk, Frijj, Black and White and Fresh 'n' Lo.
