= Kerr (given name) =

- Pronunciation: /kɛər/
- Gender: Male

Origin
- Region of origin: England, Scotland

Kerr is traditionally an English and Scottish surname, a topographic name for someone who lived by a marsh or swampy woodland. Middle English kerr means ‘brushwood wet ground.’ People with the given name Kerr include:

- Kerr Avon, fictional character from Blakes 7
- Kerr Eby (1890–1946), American illustrator
- Kerr Grant (1878–1967), Australian physicist
- Kerr Kriisa (born 2001), Estonian basketball player
- Kerr Neilson, Australian funds manager
- W. Kerr Scott (1896–1958), North Carolina governor and US senator
- Kerr Smith (born 1972), American actor
- Kerr Smith (footballer) (born 2004), Scottish footballer

== See also ==
- Clan Kerr, origins of the name
- Kerr (surname)
