= James Hutchison Kerr =

American educator, engineer, and politician

James Hutchison Kerr (August 30, 1837 – June 10, 1919) was an American educator, engineer, and politician.

James Hutchison Kerr was born on August 30, 1837, to parents John Alexander Kerr and Eliza Jane Hutchison. Through his father, Kerr was of Scots-Irish descent. His mother's family was of Scottish descent. Both Kerr's paternal and maternal ancestors rebelled against James II of England during the Siege of Derry. The Kerr family lived in Chambersville, Pennsylvania, and subsequently moved to Oxford, Pennsylvania in 1844. Kerr was a pupil at New London Academy, then pursued further education in Rochester and Albany, New York, where he specialized in geology. Kerr returned to Pennsylvania to enroll at Westminster College in 1856, and eventually earned a degree from Yale University in 1865. During his final year at Yale, Kerr worked within the natural sciences department at Russell Military Academy. Upon leaving Russell, Kerr moved to Missouri instead of Mexico, where he had been offered a position as assistant geologist. Kerr became principal of the Jackson Collegiate Institute in Jackson, Missouri for two years. In 1869, he founded the Fruitland Normal Institute and served as superintendent of the Cape Girardeau County schools for four years. The Fruitland Normal Institute later moved to Cape Girardeau, but he remained principal of the institution for six consecutive years. Kerr fell ill with tuberculosis, began preparing to relocate to Colorado in 1874, and began his tenure as lead administrator at Colorado College in 1875. He founded a mining school that same year, and headed that program until 1880. Kerr was also a professor of chemistry and geology from 1876. Between 1876 and 1899, Kerr worked on several engineering projects throughout Mexico as well as Central and South America, lending his expertise in mining and metallurgy. He also traveled to China, Japan, and throughout Europe. In 1878, Yale awarded Kerr a master's degree. He served a single term on the Colorado House of Representatives from 1882 to 1884.

James Hutchison Kerr married Mary Ella Spear on December 25, 1866. The couple had three children, son Guy Manning, and daughters, Helen May and Maria Louise, who died in 1886. Kerr moved to the Glockner Tuberculosis Sanatorium in Colorado Springs in 1900 with his wife, who had been paralyzed from a stroke in 1899. He died there on June 10, 1919, with his surviving daughter at his bedside. His wife survived him, and was subsequently informed of his death. From 1883, Kerr had lived in a Queen Anne mansion on 30 East Platte Avenue. The El Paso Club moved into the residence in the 1890s.

Colorado College holds a collection of Kerr's papers, mainly dated from the time he was a resident of Glockner Sanatorium.
