= Kevin Kerr =

Kevin Kerr may refer to:

- Kevin Kerr (actor) (born 1968), Canadian actor
- Kevin Kerr (ice hockey) (born 1967), Canadian ice hockey player
- Kevin Kerr (Irish footballer) (c. 1915–2005), Irish football/soccer player
- Kevin Kerr (Scottish footballer) (born 1989), Scottish football/soccer player (Pittsburgh Riverhounds)
- Kevin Kerr (cricketer) (born 1961), South African cricketer
