= Gordon Kerr =

Gordon Kerr may refer to:

- Gordon Kerr (British Army officer) (born c. 1948)
- Gordon Kerr (footballer), Scottish footballer
- Gordon Kerr (swimmer) (1917–2009), Canadian backstroke swimmer
