= Willie Kerr =

Scottish footballer

Personal information
- Full name: William Kerr
- Place of birth: Scotland
- Position: Wing half

Senior career*
Years	Team	Apps	(Gls)
- Bearsden Amateurs
1962–1964	Queen's Park	33	(1)

International career
1963	Scotland Amateurs	2	(0)
- * Club domestic league appearances and goals

William Kerr is a Scottish retired amateur footballer who played in the Scottish League for Queen's Park as a wing half. He was capped by Scotland at amateur level.
