= Bronwen Kerr =

New Zealand architect

- Education: Victoria University of Wellington
- Occupation: Architect
- Practice: Kerr Ritchie

Bronwen Kerr is a New Zealand architect.

== Biography ==
Kerr studied architecture at Victoria University of Wellington. On graduating, she worked at Studio Pacific Architecture in Wellington before moving overseas and working for Erick van Egeraat in Rotterdam in the Netherlands.

In 2001, she established architectural firm Kerr Ritchie with Pete Ritchie. The firm is based in Central Otago and design residential projects around the South Island of New Zealand.

In 2013, Kerr convened the jury for the New Zealand Institute of Architects Southern Architecture Awards and served on the jury again in 2019.
