= Fischach =

- Municipality
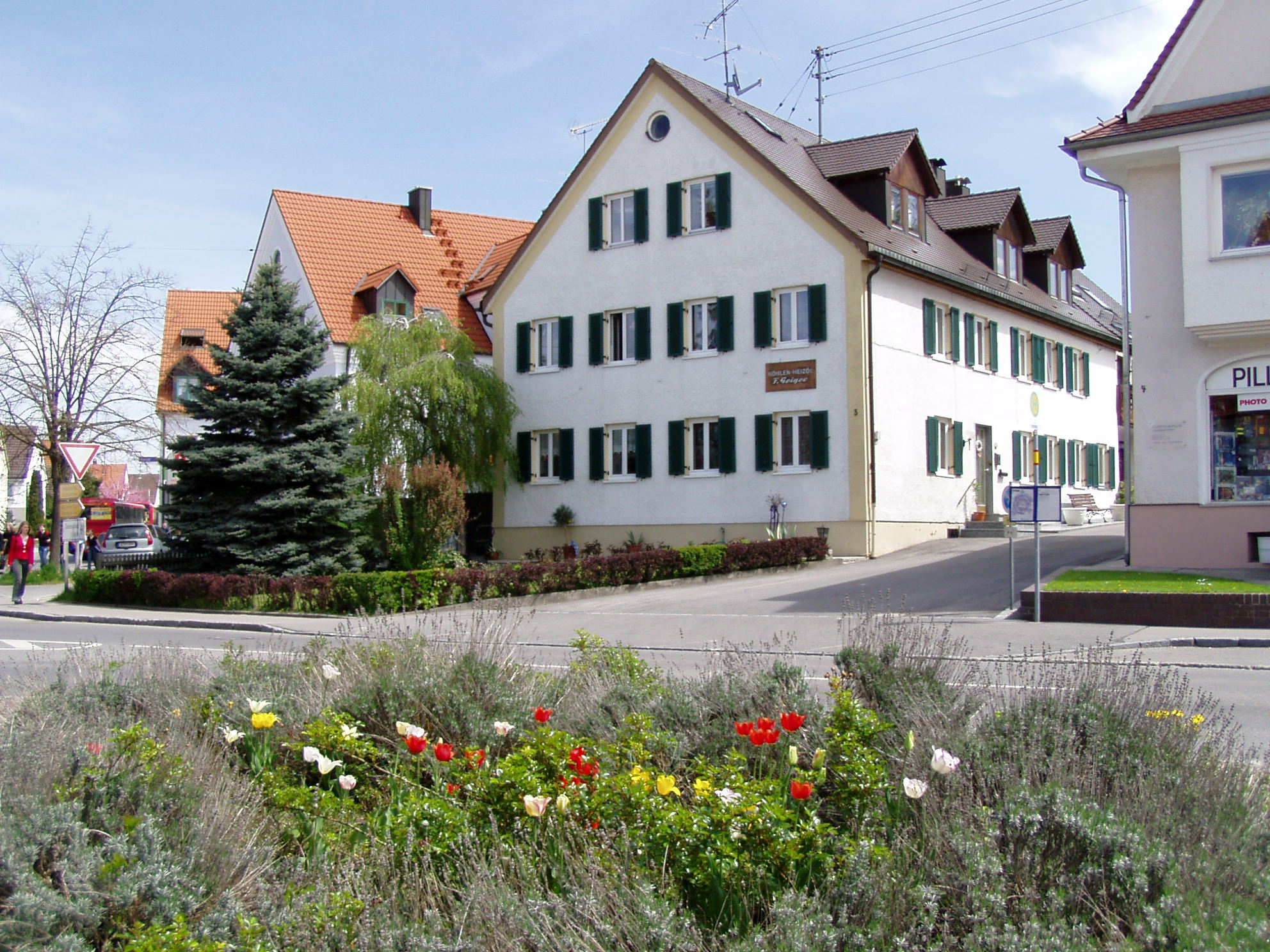
- Market square in Fischach

- Coat of arms

- Location of Fischach within Augsburg district
- Interactive map of Fischach
- Location within Germany Location within Bavaria
- Coordinates: 48°17′N 10°39′E
- Country: Germany
- State: Bavaria
- Admin. region: Schwaben
- District: Augsburg

Government
  - Mayor (2020–26): Peter Ziegelmeier (SPD)

Area
  - Total: 30.17 km^{2} (11.65 sq mi)
- Elevation: 495 m (1,624 ft)

Population (2025-12-31)
  - Total: 5,089
  - Density: 168.7/km^{2} (436.9/sq mi)
- Time zone: UTC+01:00 (CET)
  - Summer (DST): UTC+02:00 (CEST)
- Postal codes: 86850
- Dialling codes: 08236
- Vehicle registration: A
- Website: www.fischach.de

Fischach (German pronunciation: [ˈfɪʃax]) is a municipality in the district of Augsburg in Bavaria in Germany.

== Geography ==
Fischach is situated in the "Naturpark Westliche Wälder" south of Augsburg. The village has been established where the two rivers, Schmutter and Neufnach gather together.

== Districts ==
Fischach consists of the following districts:

- Aretsried
- Elmischwang
- Itzlishofen
- Fischach
- Heimberg
- Reitenbuch
- Siegertshofen
- Todtenschläule
- Tronetshofen
- Willmatshofen
- Wollmetshofen

== Culture and Sightseeing ==
A Jewish cemetery is situated in Fischach, which has been established 1774 by the former Jewish community. Today, it is occupied by the administration and can be visited after requesting a permission. (Anecdotal—In the summer of 1955, while stationed with the US Army on World War II Occupation Duty in Augsburg, contact was made with the Forestry Service which provided an escort with the key for access to the cemetery and visit to family graves. The escort explained that some wooden furnishings and hearse parts were used as fuel in the bitter winter of 1944 in addition to cutting some of the trees. Regular bombing runs were made on the Augsburg Airfield/Messerschmidt Aircraft factory, 20 miles east of Fischach. The hill towards the rear of the cemetery provided elevation for antiaircraft fire, so such a unit was put into the cemetery. A decorated wooden board Succah used in Fischach in the first quarter of the 20th Century is in the collection of the Museum in Jerusalem. It had been in seasonal use by members of our family and is part of rotating displays of Jewish ceremonial objects at the Museum in Israel). There is also a former synagogue and a Jewish community-house with a school attached to. In 1999, a Jewish monument was raised.

== Economy ==
German dairy company Müller is headquartered in the district of Aretsried.

== Notable people ==
- Theo Müller, German businessman and CEO of Müller dairy company
