= Ker, Azerbaijan =

Ker
- Location within Azerbaijan
- Coordinates: 38°38′N 48°30′E
- Country: Azerbaijan
- Rayon: Lerik
- Time zone: UTC+4 (AZT)
  - Summer (DST): UTC+5 (AZT)

Ker is a village in the Lerik Rayon of Azerbaijan.
