= Jasper Kerr =

Scottish footballer

Personal information
- Full name: Jasper Howat Kerr
- Date of birth: 25 November 1898
- Place of birth: Burnbank, Scotland
- Date of death: 1986 (aged 87–88)
- Position: Full-back

Senior career*
Years	Team	Apps	(Gls)
1921–1922	Burnbank Athletic		
1922–1923	Larkhall Thistle		
1923–1924	Bathgate		
1924–1927	Everton	18	(1)
1927–1932	Preston North End	121	(0)
1933–1934	New Brighton	10	(0)
1934	Lancaster Town		
Total		149	(1)
- * Club domestic league appearances and goals

Jasper Howat Kerr (2 December 1895 – 1979) was a Scottish footballer who played in the Football League for Everton, New Brighton and Preston North End.
