= Brian Kerr =

Brian Kerr may refer to:

- Brian Kerr (Irish football manager) (born 1953), Irish football manager (Republic of Ireland national team, Faroe Islands national team)
- Brian Kerr (Scottish footballer) (born 1981), Scottish football player (Newcastle United, Motherwell, Hibernian, national team) and manager (Albion Rovers)
- Brian Kerr (politician) (born 1945), Canadian politician
- Brian Kerr, Baron Kerr of Tonaghmore (1948−2020), British law lord and former Lord Chief Justice of Northern Ireland
