= Mark Kerr =

Mark Kerr may refer to:

== Military ==
- Lord Mark Kerr (British Army officer, born 1676) (1676–1752), British general and military governor, Governor of Sheerness, and Governor of Edinburgh Castle
- Lord Mark Kerr (Royal Navy officer) (1776–1840), British admiral, contender for Antrim (UK Parliament constituency)
- Lord Mark Kerr (British Army officer, born 1817) (1817−1900), British general, nephew of the above
- Mark Kerr (Royal Navy officer, born 1864) (1864−1944), British admiral and Royal Air Force general, nephew of the above
- Mark Kerr (Royal Navy officer, born 1949), British admiral

== Others ==
- Mark Kerr (abbot) (died 1584), Abbot of Newbattle, Scotland
- Mark Kerr, 1st Earl of Lothian (1553−1609), Scottish nobleman and politician
- Mark Kerr (fighter) (born 1968), American mixed martial artist and collegiate wrestler
- Mark Kerr (footballer) (born 1982), Scottish footballer
