= William Ker =

William Ker may refer to:

- William Ker, Lord Ker (d. 1618), the eldest son of Robert Ker, 1st Earl of Roxburghe
- William Ker, 2nd Earl of Roxburghe (d. 1675), Scottish nobleman
- William Paton Ker (1855–1923), Scottish literary scholar and essayist
- William Ker (footballer) (1852–1911), Scottish international footballer
- William Balfour Ker (1877–1918), American illustrator

== See also ==
- William Kerr (disambiguation)
