= John Hunter Kerr =

Australian photographer

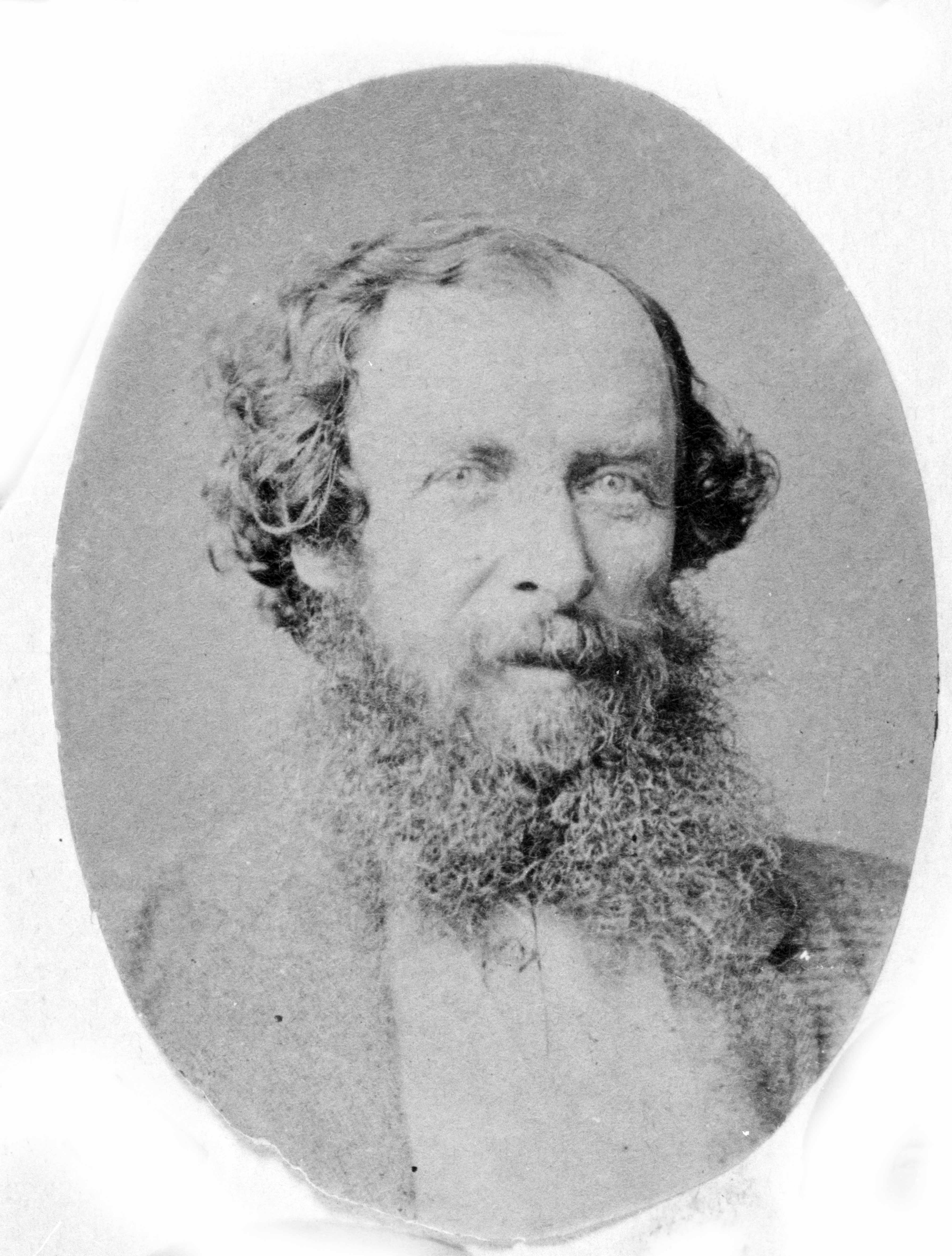
- John Hunter Kerr 1872
- Born: 16 April 1820 (National Records Scotland 1820/685/1 550 140); St Andrews, Edinburgh, Scotland
- Died: 6 February 1874 (aged 53); Williams Street, Prahran, Victoria
- Occupations: Grazier, painter, photographer
- Spouse: Frances Murphy
- Parent(s): Captain Alexander Robert Kerr (R.N) and Charlotte Maule

John Hunter Kerr (1820–1874) was a Scottish-born grazier, amateur photographer and collector of Indigenous artefacts in Victoria, Australia, during the mid-nineteenth century. He was the fourth son of Captain A R. Kerr, R.N., C B, and brother of Vice-Admiral R. Kerr.

== Early life ==
Kerr was born in 1820 in Edinburgh, Scotland, and was great-nephew of the past New South Wales Governor, Admiral John Hunter. Kerr arrived in the Port Phillip District in 1839 at the age of 18 aboard the ship the Midlothian and initially took up land near Heidelberg near Melbourne, Victoria.

== Victoria estate ==
He returned to Britain in 1841, but re-emigrated in 1849, purchasing the 'Edgars Plains' pastoral lease of 89,000 acres, north west of Bendigo near Boort, in the Loddon District, Victoria and renamed it 'Fernyhurst' (sometimes spelt 'Fernihurst'). Initially, with his partner Godfrey, he sold meat to the diggers on the Korong goldfields, and gained some success. In January 1851 he had won a gold medal for 'the best colonial thoroughbred' in an exhibition organised by the Victorian Industrial Society. and he was appointed a magistrate in 1854. However, 'Bad seasons and adverse circumstances' including the 'dissipation' of his partner caused him to have to sell 'Fernyhurst' in 1855, but he stayed on the property, possibly acting as manager, until 1861, the same year that he married Frances Murphy.

== Aboriginal ethnographic collection ==
Kerr was also a painter and photographer and was particularly interested in recording the local Aboriginal people, with whom he claimed to have been 'always on very friendly terms'. He drew a portrait of 'Queen Jerrybung' or 'Jellibung', an elderly matriarch of the tribe, and a lithograph was later made of his drawing, which he exhibited in the Victorian Society of Fine Arts Exhibition in December 1857. His greatest contributions to Aboriginal ethnography came from a series of photographs of Aboriginal men women and children of the Loddon and Murray Tribes probably Dja Dja Wurrung and Yorta Yorta people, and a collection of artefacts which he also obtained from them. These included weapons, hunting implements, examples of clothing, toys and work in progress, such as a possum skin cloak in course of production and a skin stretched on a piece of bark. There was also an emu skin, some 'native boys' play sticks' and some examples of women's work, particularly 'native grass wrought by lubras' and 'a kangaroo rat bag'.

Of special note were three items of ceremonial significance: 'emu feathers used in corrobberys'; 'kangaroo rat skins, used in corrobberys'; and a large curved piece of bark in the shape of an emu, decorated with white ochre lines, which he later told collector R.E. Johns that he had seen used in corroborees. Two bark engravings and a painted bark emu figure from the British Museum and Kew Gardens respectively were loaned for an exhibition at the Melbourne Museum in 2004. They became part of a controversy over repatriation of cultural property, when their return was blocked by a heritage declaration, which was subsequently overturned.

== Exhibitions ==
His collection was first exhibited at the Bendigo Exhibition (also known as the Sandhurst Exhibition) of 1854, and then in Melbourne, and ultimately at the Exposition Universelle in Paris in 1855. Special Commissioner Edward Bell was entrusted with the Victorian exhibits including Kerr's collections, and oversaw the setting up of the Victorian Court as part of the British Court in the new exhibition buildings along the Champs-Élysées.

== General references ==
- Willis, Elizabeth (2003) 'Exhibiting Aboriginal Industry: A Story Behind a 'Re-Discovered' Bark Drawing From Victoria' Aboriginal History, Volume 27, pp. 39–58
- Marguerite Hancock, ‘Introduction’, Glimpses of Life in Victoria by ‘A Resident’ [J.H.Kerr], Melbourne, Miegunyah Press, 1996
