= Bobby Kerr (footballer, born 1929) =

Scottish footballer (1929–2012)

Personal information
- Full name: Robert James Kerr
- Date of birth: 29 November 1929
- Place of birth: Coatbridge, Scotland
- Date of death: 13 May 2012 (aged 82)
- Place of death: Edinburgh, Scotland
- Positions: Inside forward; centre forward

Senior career*
Years	Team	Apps	(Gls)
19??–1951	Pollok		
1951–1952	Third Lanark	0	(0)
1952–1953	Darlington	10	(2)
1953–1955	Third Lanark	23	(18)
1955–1956	Stirling Albion	15	(3)
1956–1957	Greenock Morton	15	(12)
- * Club domestic league appearances and goals

Robert James Kerr (29 November 1929 – 13 May 2012) was a Scottish footballer who played as an inside forward or centre forward in the English Football League for Darlington and in the Scottish Football League for Third Lanark, Stirling Albion and Greenock Morton in the 1950s.

== Life and career ==
Kerr was born in Coatbridge in 1929. He played Junior football for Pollok before signing for "A" Division club Third Lanark. He made no first-team appearances before his career was interrupted by National Service commitments with the RAF. In the later part of 1952, he was stationed at RAF Middleton St George, in the north east of England, and Third Lanark allowed him to play for Darlington of the English Third Division North when available to do so. He appeared for Darlington's reserves in the North-Eastern League, as well as in Services football, before making his senior debut in the Third Division on 20 December, replacing Ken Murray at inside left for a 3–0 defeat away to Southport. Later in the season, he had a run of games, also in place of Murray, and took his total to ten by the end of the season. He scored twice, at home to Accrington Stanley in March and Stockport County in April; on each occasion it was the only goal of the match.

Kerr returned to Third Lanark for the 1953–54 season, by which time they had been relegated to the "B" Division. He made his first appearance on 16 January 1954 in a 3–0 win away to Dunfermline Athletic, replacing George Dobbie, who had been posted abroad, and kept the place for the remaining 12 league matches, during which he scored 10 goals. He was less of a regular in the 1954–55 season, at the end of which he was transfer listed at a fee of £1000. Bradford City of the English Third Division were interested, and were reported to have held talks with the player, but no move took place.

An appeal to the Scottish League's management committee to have his fee reduced was successful, and he joined "A" Division club Stirling Albion. He appeared at outside right in the opening match of the season, but went on to play in only 15 top-flight matches, scoring three goals. He was released at the end of the season, and spent 1956–57 with Morton in the second tier, in which he appeared equally infrequently but with a significantly better goal return, with twelve goals from his 15 outings.

He was variously described as "well built", "hefty", and "big and strong", as well as being a scorer of spectacular goals.

Kerr died in Edinburgh in 2012 at the age of 82.

== Club statistics ==
Appearances and goals by club, season and competition
Club	Season	League			National Cup (Note: Includes FA Cup, Scottish Cup)		League Cup		Total	
Club	Season	Division	Apps	Goals	Apps	Goals	Apps	Goals	Apps	Goals
Darlington	1952–53	Third Division North	10	2	0	0	—		10	2
Third Lanark	1953–54	"B" Division	13	10	5	6	0	0	18	16
Third Lanark	1954–55	"B" Division	10	8	2	0	3	1	15	9
Third Lanark	Total		23	18	7	6	3	1	33	25
Stirling Albion	1955–56	"A" Division	15	3	1	1	5	3	21	7
Morton	1956–57	Division Two	15	12	2	0	5	1	22	13
Career total			63	35	10	7	13	5	86	47
