= Chambersville, Pennsylvania =

Unincorporated community in Pennsylvania, US

- Unincorporated community
- Location within Pennsylvania Location within the United States
- Coordinates: 40°42′19″N 79°09′28″W
- Country: United States
- State: Pennsylvania
- County: Indiana
- Township: Rayne
- Elevation: 1,099 ft (335 m)
- Time zone: UTC-5 (Eastern (EST))
  - Summer (DST): UTC-4 (EDT)
- ZIP code: 15723
- Area code: 724
- GNIS feature ID: 1171543

Chambersville is an unincorporated community in Indiana County, Pennsylvania, United States. The community is 2.5 miles (4.0 km) northeast of Creekside. Chambersville is in ZIP code 15723.
