= T. Michael Kerr =

American government official

Personal details
- Born: Thomas Michael Kerr; October 12, 1962 (age 63) Pittsburgh, Pennsylvania, U.S.
- Education: Tufts University (BA); Massachusetts Institute of Technology (MS)

Thomas Michael Kerr is an American government official currently serving as the Assistant Secretary for Administration and Management at the United States Department of Labor.

== Biography ==
=== Early life and education ===
Kerr earned a Bachelor of Arts from Tufts University and holds a master's degree in City Planning from the Massachusetts Institute of Technology.

=== Career ===
Kerr served as Assistant to the Secretary-Treasurer of the Service Employees International Union in charge of finance and administration. He has also conducted political and legislative work for the American Federation of State, County and Municipal Employees, both before and after working in the White House Office of Consumer Affairs in the Carter Administration. In 2005, he was elected as a Fellow of the National Academy of Public Administration.

=== Prior Labor Department service ===
Kerr spent a total of eight years at the Labor Department, first in the office of Robert Reich, then for Alexis Herman in the Wage and Hour Division as the Deputy Assistant Secretary.

== Family ==
He is the son of Thomas M. Kerr Jr., and Jean Kerr.
