= Kevin Kerr (cricketer) =

South African cricketer (born 1961)

Kevin John Kerr (born 11 September 1961) is a former South African cricketer of Scottish birth. He was active from 1978 to 1990 and played for Transvaal B, Transvaal, Warwickshire and the South African Defence Force cricket team. He was born in Airdrie, Lanarkshire. He appeared in 83 first-class matches as a righthanded batsman who bowled right arm off break. He scored 1,040 runs with a highest score of 74 and held 64 catches. He took 211 wickets with a best performance of 6 for 37.
