= John Kerr (broadcaster) =

Australian radio announcer

John Kerr (born 19 February 1942) is an Australian radio announcer.

Radio announcer John Kerr

John Kerr previously hosted the top-rated weekend edition of the New Day Australia program from midnight to 6 am on 2UE and the Fairfax Radio Network as well as many regional affiliate stations.

Between 1994 and 2005 John hosted the weekday version of New Day Australia. In 2006, his on-air shift was changed to the weekend edition of the show. Radio announcer Stuart Bocking replaced John in the weekday shifts of New Day Australia.

On 1 December 2012, during his 2UE show, John Kerr announced his retirement from radio after 55 years on the air, 18 of which have been on the overnight shift at 2UE, first on weekdays and now on weekends. John made a private announcement to a select number of his biggest fans at a listener lunch in Sydney yesterday afternoon. John remained on air until the Australia Day weekend. His final show was broadcast on the morning of Sunday 27 January 2013.

John Kerr's syrupy voice and warmth of feeling were characteristic of New Day Australia. One of the more memorable if controversial features of his time running this segment was the recurrence with which he was made to field phone calls about Australian singer-songwriter, John Farnham, between 2005 and 2010. A portion of these conversations have been posted to YouTube.

== Career ==
- 1957: John started off in radio working behind the scenes for the Jack Davey Show.
- 1958: John became a cadet announcer with radio 2PK Parkes.
- 1959: Moved to 2DU Dubbo.
- 1960: Became the breakfast announcer for 2CA Canberra In this role, John made appearances on television station CTC 7 (now 10 Regional).
- 1966: John moved to Canada and worked with BOAC (now British Airways), after six months he visited Scotland and became part of pirate radio and joined Radio Scotland, where he stayed until it closed 18 months later.
- 1967: John returned to Australia and worked briefly for Channel 9 before joining 2UE for five and a half years.
- 1973: John went back to Canberra briefly, before moving to Gosford where he hosted the 2GO breakfast show for 13 years.
- 1986: John left radio to start a public relations company
- 1994: John was asked by 2ue's station management to rejoin Radio 2UE as the host of the New Day Australia program on weekdays between midnight and 5 am.
- 2006: John was moved to the weekend version of New Day Australia.
