= John Ker (priest) =

Canadian Anglican priest

John Ker was a Canadian Anglican priest, most notably Archdeacon of St Andrews in the Diocese of Montreal.

Ker was educated at Trinity College, Toronto and ordained in 1876. After a curacy at Glen Sutton he held incumbencies at Dunham, Quebec and Pointe-Saint-Charles. In 1902 he became an Archdeacon.
