= John Kerr (Scottish footballer) =

Scottish footballer

Personal information
- Full name: John Kerr
- Place of birth: Scotland
- Position: Outside left

Senior career*
Years	Team	Apps	(Gls)
1910–1912	Queen's Park	0	(0)
1911–1912	Arthurlie	2	(0)
1913–1916	Queen's Park	8	(0)
- * Club domestic league appearances and goals

John Kerr was a Scottish amateur footballer who played as an outside left in the Scottish League for Queen's Park and Arthurlie.

== Personal life ==
Allan served as a private in the Army Service Corps (Motor Transport) during the First World War.

== Career statistics ==
Appearances and goals by club, season and competition
Club	Season	League			National Cup		Other		Total	
Club	Season	Division	Apps	Goals	Apps	Goals	Apps	Goals	Apps	Goals
Arthurlie	1911–12	Scottish Second Division	2	0	0	0	—		2	0
Queen's Park	1914–15	Scottish First Division	8	0	—		1 (Note: Appearance in Glasgow Cup)	0	9	0
Career total			10	0	0	0	1	0	11	0
