= Alex Kerr =

Alex Kerr may refer to:

- Alex Kerr (Australian footballer) (1880–?), Australian rules footballer
- Alex Kerr (Japanologist) (born 1952), American writer and Japanologist
- Alex Kerr (loyalist), Northern Irish former loyalist paramilitary
- Alex Kerr (politician), Scottish politician
- Alex Kerr (soccer) (born 2001), American soccer player

== See also ==
- Alexander Kerr (disambiguation)
