= Robert Kerr (missionary) =

Scottish physician, missionary, judge, and author

- Born: Year unknown Glasgow, Scotland
- Died: 1918
- Occupation: Physician, Missionary
- Spouse: Miss Jeffrey

Robert Kerr, M.D., (?-1918) was a Scottish physician, missionary, judge, and author. Sent to Morocco by the Jewish Committee of the English Presbyterian Church to work as both a medical and religious missionary, Kerr provided various types of medical care to both Jewish and Muslim people. He served in Morocco for 30 years and provided aid to a diverse group of patients. The bulk of his missionary work is recorded in his novels Pioneering in Morocco: A Record of Seven Years’ Medical Mission Work in the Palace and the Hut and Morocco After Twenty-Five Years.

== Early life and call to missionary work ==
Robert Kerr was born in Glasgow, Scotland (date unknown), into a Presbyterian family. Originally practicing medicine in Scotland and England, Kerr was called upon by the Presbyterian Church of England to serve as both a medical and religious missionary to the people of Morocco. Sharing Kerr’s passion for religious mission work and care for the underprivileged, his wife Miss Jeffrey joined him in Morocco along with his children.

== Missionary work ==
Robert Kerr pursued his medical and religious missionary work through the Jewish Committee of the English Presbyterian Church. His missionary work began with his dispatch to Rabat, Morocco on 20 February 1886. Over the course of 30 years, Kerr would focus his work on the communities of Rabat and Salé. His wife Miss Jeffrey would accompany him on his missionary trips and work alongside Kerr, providing care especially to women and children. Kerr eventually worked as an independent missionary in 1894, resigning his ties with the Presbyterian Church of England due to a lack of funding from the group. Both of Kerr's novels focus on his work in Rabat and Salé.

=== Missionary work in Rabat ===
Kerr was the first Christian missionary to serve in Rabat, and he cared for over 2,000 people in the city during his career. His missionary work extended to both Jews and Muslims, and he also provided aid to the tribesmen of Beni Hassan, Zenior, Ziarr, and El Arab who traveled to the capital. In Rabat, Kerr served at the Medical Mission Housf. Kerr's talent for medicine in Rabat was noted by the Moorish leadership, and Kerr was often called upon to treat inmates of the Sultan and members of the Sultan's family. This was considered an honor, as Kerr was a Christian and normally would not have had intimate access to members of Muslim and Moorish leadership. Kerr's services were also invoked in matters of perilous cases of childbirth; however, his Christian religion often presented a barrier between him and the Muslims. Many traditional Muslims refused his services, but his help was received more readily by the Jews. Kerr was one of the first missionaries to treat both Muslims and Jews equally and not exclusively focus on one race in Rabat. While his medical services were eventually accepted universally in Rabat, his efforts of religious conversion were met with resistance. One young Jewish man once communicated to Kerr that his "parents would disown [him]" if he "confessed Christ." Although he failed to convert a significant number of the population of Rabat to Christianity, specifically Presbyterianism, Kerr did succeed in creating better relations between the Muslim, Jewish, and Christian faiths. In one case, Kerr was summoned to treat a boy who had been run over by a European's carriage. Tensions were building as a rumor had spread that the Christian had deliberately injured the boy. However, Kerr was able to verify that the boy was not substantially injured and that the boy had rather been told to run in front of the carriage as part of a scheme to portray the Christians and Europeans in a poor light. Kerr provided for the medical needs of the people of Rabat and also improved relations between different religions and ethnic groups in the city.

=== Missionary work in Salé ===
Kerr's work in Salé also centered on medical care and religious conversion. His work in Salé was carried out synchronously with his missionary service in Rabat, and he made his first trip to Salé in March 1886. In Salé, Kerr mainly treated cases of malaria, smallpox, and consumption. His preventative efforts focused on vaccination and hygiene education. In Salé, Kerr encountered stronger resistance to medical treatment as he was a Christian. Met with jeers and curses upon entering the city, Kerr found it difficult to establish trust among the Muslims and Jewish residents. However, following a successful smallpox vaccination campaign in the midst of an epidemic, the people came to accept his aid. Kerr became the first Christian missionary to establish permanent residency within the city gates. Additionally, during a rebellion against Europeans within Salé, Kerr became the only Christian European allowed to enter the city. Although his efforts of religious conversion were again met with resistance, religion eventually posed no barrier in regards to medical treatment. Kerr also assumed status as a judge within Salé. He settled arguments regarding interfamily feuds, small wars, and theft. Kerr came to be accepted by both the Muslims and Jews of the city, and his patients praised his medical work.

== Legacy ==
Kerr's 30 years of service impacted a diverse group of people, and he provided aid to thousands over the course of his missionary work in Morocco. Kerr fulfilled a variety of positions of authority, and he compiled his experiences into two separate novels. Kerr also frequently authored columns for newspapers regarding his views on the French occupation of Morocco, and he was featured as a writer for multiple publications. Upon Kerr's passing, the Khalifa of Rabat expressed the community's deep sense of loss of "[their] precious doctor." Although Kerr intended to place the proceeds of his novel Morocco After Twenty-Five Years towards building a hospital in Rabat, he passed before he could achieve his goal. Kerr's work in both Rabat and Salé is considered significant due to his nondiscrimination on the basis of ethnicity or religion in regards to medical treatment, as he served both Muslims and Jews. Kerr also earned honorary positions of authority within the Muslim and Jewish communities in Rabat and Salé, and he was eventually treated similarly to a native. His advice for travelers within his novels has even been incorporated into travel guides today. Kerr's ability to break down religious barriers and gain acceptance into different cultures has solidified him as a notable medical missionary.

== Writings ==
- Pioneering in Morocco: A Record of Seven Years' Medical Mission Work in the Palace and the Hut (2007)
- Morocco After Twenty-Five Years (1912)
