= John Ker =

Scottish spy during the Jacobite risings (1673–1726)

John Ker, born John Crawford
- Born: 8 August 1673; Crawfurdland, Ayrshire Scotland
- Died: 8 July 1726 (aged 52) King's Bench Prison, London
- Buried: St George the Martyr, Southwark

John Ker (8 August 1673 – 8 July 1726), born John Crawford in Crawfurdland, Ayrshire, was a Scots Presbyterian linked with Cameronian radicals who between 1705 and 1709 acted as a government informer against the Jacobites. Dogged by financial issues most of his life, he died in King's Bench Prison in 1726.

== Life ==
Ker was born on 8 August 1673, eldest son of Alexander Crawfurd of Fergushill who appears as a Commissioner of Supply in the 1685 records of the Parliament of Scotland.

He married Anna, younger daughter of Robert Ker, of Kersland, near Kilbirnie, whose only son Daniel Ker was killed at the Battle of Steinkeerke in 1692. Anna's elder sister Jean Ker sold him the family estates in 1697 and thereafter he assumed the name and arms of Ker.

== Career ==
The 1690s were a time of extreme economic hardship and famine in Scotland, known as the seven ill years; in December 1696, the city of Edinburgh set up a refugee camp in Greyfriars kirkyard to house starving rural migrants. This impacted the viability of small estates such as Fergushill and John was already under financial pressure when he purchased Kersland.

Having become a leader among the extreme Covenanters, he made use of his influence to relieve his pecuniary embarrassments, selling his support at one time to the Jacobites, at another to the government, and whenever possible to both parties at the same time. He held a licence from the government in 1707 permitting him to associate with those whose disloyalty was known or suspected, proving that he was at that date the government's paid spy. In his Memoirs Ker asserts that he had a number of other spies and agents working under his orders in different parts of the country. He entered into correspondence with Catholic priests and Jacobite conspirators, whose schemes, so far as he could make himself cognisant of them, he betrayed to the government. But he was known to be a man of the worst character, and it is improbable that he succeeded in gaining the confidence of people of any importance. The Duchess of Gordon was for a time, it is true, one of his correspondents, but in 1707 she had discovered him to be a knave. He went to London in 1709, where he seems to have extracted considerable sums of money from politicians of both parties by promising or threatening, as the case might be, to expose Godolphin's relations with the Jacobites.

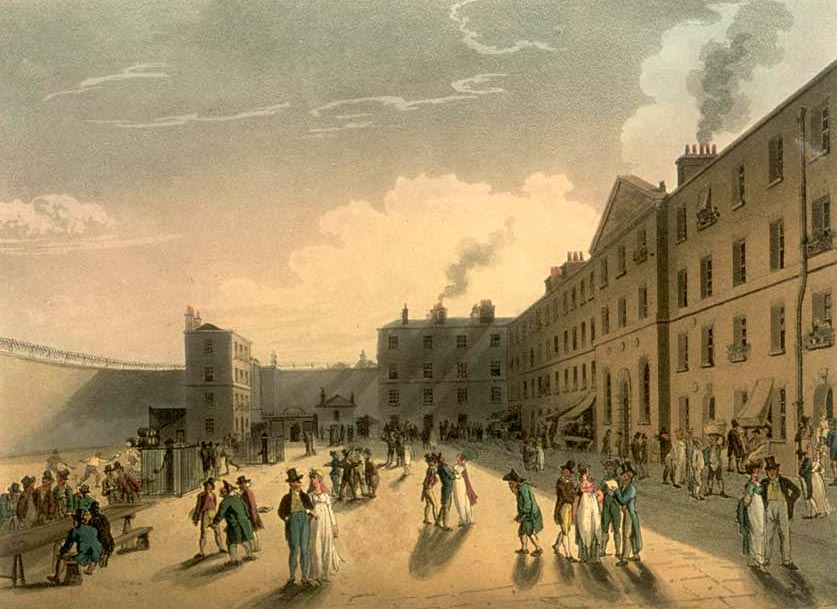
King's Bench Prison ca 1808–11.

In 1713, if his own story is to be believed, business of a semi-diplomatic nature took Ker to Vienna, where, although he failed in the principal object of his errand, the Emperor made him a present of his portrait set in jewels. Ker also occupied his time in Vienna, he says, by gathering information which he forwarded to the electress Sophia; and in the following year on his way home he stopped at Hanover to give some advice to the future King of Great Britain as to the best way to govern the English. Although in his own opinion Ker materially assisted in placing George I on the British throne, his services were unrewarded, owing, he would have us believe, to the incorruptibility of his character. Similar ingratitude was the recompense for his revelations of the Jacobite intentions in 1715, and as he was no more successful in making money out of the British East India Company, nor in certain commercial schemes which engaged his ingenuity during the next few years, he died in a debtor's prison.

While in the King's Bench Prison he sold to Edmund Curll the bookseller, a fellow-prisoner who was serving a sentence of five months for publishing obscene books, the manuscript of (or possibly only the materials on which were based) the Memoirs of John Ker of Kersland, which Curll published in 1726 in three parts, the last of which appeared after Ker's death. For issuing the first part of the Memoirs, which purported to make disclosures damaging to the government, but which Curll in self-justification described as vindicating the memory of Queen Anne, the publisher was sentenced to the pillory at Charing Cross; and he added to the third part of the Memoirs the indictment on which he had been convicted.
