= James S. Kerr (businessman) =

- Taken in 1983
- Born: July 28, 1909; Brookhaven, Mississippi, USA
- Died: September 19, 2006 (aged 97); San Antonio, Texas

James Storm Kerr (July 28, 1909 – September 19, 2006) was an American appliance salesman. In 1956, he founded the American Basic Science Club, a mail-order business which sold science kits for children.

== Early life and career beginnings ==
James Storm Kerr was born on July 28, 1909, in Brookhaven, Mississippi. He attended college for two years but, due to the Great Depression, left school and began working in construction on the Mississippi River's levees. He moved to San Antonio, Texas, in 1933 to work. In the 1940s, he joined the United States military to fight in World War II as a fighter plane controller; he was stationed in Italy and North Africa.

After returning from the war, Kerr founded James Kerr Co., an appliance company. He worked there until 1956 when the business failed.

== American Basic Science Club ==
After the closure of his appliance store, Kerr founded the American Basic Science Club (ABS) in 1956. A mail order business, the club sold children's science kits: each member was sent one kit a month; there were eight or ten kits total Kerr, who was not a scientist, worked with a physicist and an electronics engineer at the Southwest Research Institute to design the kits. Each came with an instruction manual, written by Kerr, on science projects. The first four kits were about electronics, culminating in kit which provided instructions to build a radio transmitter. The remaining kits where on different subjects, including weather forecasting and light. Around 1960, the ABS released the Atomic Energy Lab kit; it contained a "spinthariscope, a cloud chamber, an electroscope and various radioactive samples". The kits were designed to have interchangeable parts, so they could be combined.

Kerr initially ran the business from his garage, assembling the kits with his wife, Rosemary; initial advertisements, first run in 1957, promoted minimal interest. Later that year, however, the company ran an advertisement in the Boys life magazine; this proved to be successful marketing and prompted orders from children and teachers. Kerr maintained contact with the Southwest Research Institute, holding an exhibit on home science experiments and, by June 1958, the ABS had sold 5,000 memberships. Within two years, Kerr moved his business from his house to a building in downtown San Antonio. By 1972, the ABS had ten employees and had sold over 50,000 memberships.

Kerr ran the ABS for around 30 years. In the 21st century, kits made by the company became collector's items.

After the ABS, Kerr created an display on optics for the Dallas Museum of Nature and Science (then 'The Science Palace'). He also ran "Cosmic Doodles", a publication which taught people to draw geometric patterns.

== Personal life and death ==
Kerr married Rosemary Luckett Kerr in 1948; the couple had multiple children.

In the final days of his life, Kerr experienced a stroke. He died on September 19, 2006, in San Antonio.
