= Kier =

Kier may refer to:

- Kier (industrial), a type of boiler or vat
- Kier Group, a business active in building and civil engineering
- Kier Eagan, the fictional founder of Lumon Industries in the Apple TV series Severance

== People with the surname ==
- Avery Kier, American military officer
- David Kier, American government official
- Hiltrud Kier, Austrian art historian and academic
- Justin Kier, American basketball player
- Lemont Kier, American chemist and pharmacologist
- Olaf Kier, British businessman
- Samuel Kier, American inventor and businessman
- Udo Kier, German actor
