= Gordon Kerr (footballer) =

Scottish footballer

Personal information
- Full name: Gordon Kerr
- Place of birth: Scotland
- Position: Goalkeeper

Senior career*
Years	Team	Apps	(Gls)
1912–1915	Queen's Park	77	(0)
1915–1920	Ayr United	93	(0)
1920–1923	Albion Rovers	64	(0)
1922–1923	→ Bathgate (loan)	3	(0)
- * Club domestic league appearances and goals

Gordon Kerr was a Scottish professional football goalkeeper who played in the Scottish League for Ayr United, Queen's Park, Albion Rovers and Bathgate.

== Personal life ==
Kerr served as a second lieutenant in the British Army during the First World War. He was admitted to hospital in France in December 1917.

== Career statistics ==
Appearances and goals by club, season and competition
Club	Season	League			Scottish Cup		Other		Total	
Club	Season	Division	Apps	Goals	Apps	Goals	Apps	Goals	Apps	Goals
Queen's Park	1912–13	Scottish First Division	5	0	0	0	0	0	5	0
Queen's Park	1913–14	Scottish First Division	36	0	5	0	2 (Note: 1 appearance in Glasgow Cup, 1 appearance in Glasgow Merchants Charity Cup)	0	43	0
Queen's Park	1914–15	Scottish First Division	36	0	—		3 (Note: 2 appearances in Glasgow Cup, 1 appearance in Glasgow Merchants Charity Cup)	0	39	0
Queen's Park	Total		77	0	5	0	5	0	87	0
Ayr United	1915–16	Scottish First Division	38	0	—		—		38	0
Ayr United	1916–17	Scottish First Division	19	0	—		—		19	0
Ayr United	1918–19	Scottish First Division	11	0	—		—		11	0
Ayr United	1919–20	Scottish First Division	25	0	3	0	—		28	0
Ayr United	Total		93	0	3	0	—		96	0
Albion Rovers	1920–21	Scottish First Division	39	0	7	0	—		46	0
Albion Rovers	1921–22	Scottish First Division	25	0	0	0	—		25	0
Albion Rovers	Total		64	0	7	0	—		71	0
Bathgate (loan)	1922–23	Scottish Second Division	3	0	0	0	—		3	0
Career total			237	0	15	0	5	0	257	0
