= Thomas Forrester (theologian) =

The Rev Thomas Forrester (1645? – November 1706) was a Scottish theologian.

== Life ==
He was born around 1645, the son of David Forrester of Little Dinoven near Stirling. His brother, David Forrester, was a merchant and burgess of Stirling. He was licensed to preach by George, Bishop of Edinburgh, in February 1692 he became first charge minister in January 1663 and ordained as minister of Alva, east of Stirling in January 1664. Contrary to the times he refuted Episcopalian principles and sided with the Presbyterians. He was put on trial in Stirling, found guilty, and imprisoned in Edinburgh until released on indemnity in March 1674.

The perusal of John Brown's (1610?–1679) ‘Apologetical Relation’ led him to renounce episcopacy, and he became a field preacher.

He was proclaimed a fugitive 5 May 1684, and settled at Killearn. After the revolution he became in succession minister of Killearn in 1688 and sat on the General Assembly in 1690. In 1692 he became first charge minister of St. Andrews, then (and still) an important position in the Scottish church. He declined calls to serve in Glasgow and other places, and was later appointed Principal of the new St Mary's College at St Andrews University on 26 Jan. 1698.

He died in office in November 1706.

== Works ==
He was well known as one of the ablest advocates of presbyterianism of his day. His principal work is ‘The Hierarchical Bishop's Claim to a Divine Right tried at the Scripture Bar,’ 1699. Here he controverts Dr. Scott, in the second part of his ‘Christian Life,’ Principal Monro's ‘Inquiry,’ and Mr. Honeyman's ‘Survey of Naphtali.’ Other works bore the titles of ‘Rectius Instruendum,’ 1684; ‘A Vindication and Assertion of Calvin and Beza's Presbyterian Judgment and Principles,’ 1692; ‘Causa Episcopatus Hierarchici Lucifuga,’ 1706.

== Family ==
In April 1667 he married Anne Govan, daughter of Rev John Govan of Muckhart. They had several children:

- Thomas Forrester, who inherited the Dinoven estate.
- Rev John Forrester, minister of Campsie
- John
- Archibald
- Mary, married Rev George Park of Killearn
- Helen, married Rev John Henry of Kinghorn
- Barbara, married Rev John Craigie of Abercrombie
