= Nordsee =

German fast-food restaurant chain

Nordsee GmbH
- Type: Private
- Industry: Restaurants
- Founded: 1896; 130 years ago in Bremen, Germany
- Founder: Adolf Vinnen
- Headquarters: Bremerhaven, Germany
- Number of locations: 370 stores (2020)
- Area served: Germany; Austria; Switzerland; Romania; Slovakia
- Key people: Carsten Horn; Alessandro Preda; Kharis Capital
- Products: Fast Food; Seafood
- Revenue: €354 million (2016)
- Owner: Kharis Capital; QSRP - Quick Service Restaurant Plattform
- Number of employees: 6000 (2020)
- Website: https://www.nordsee.com/en/

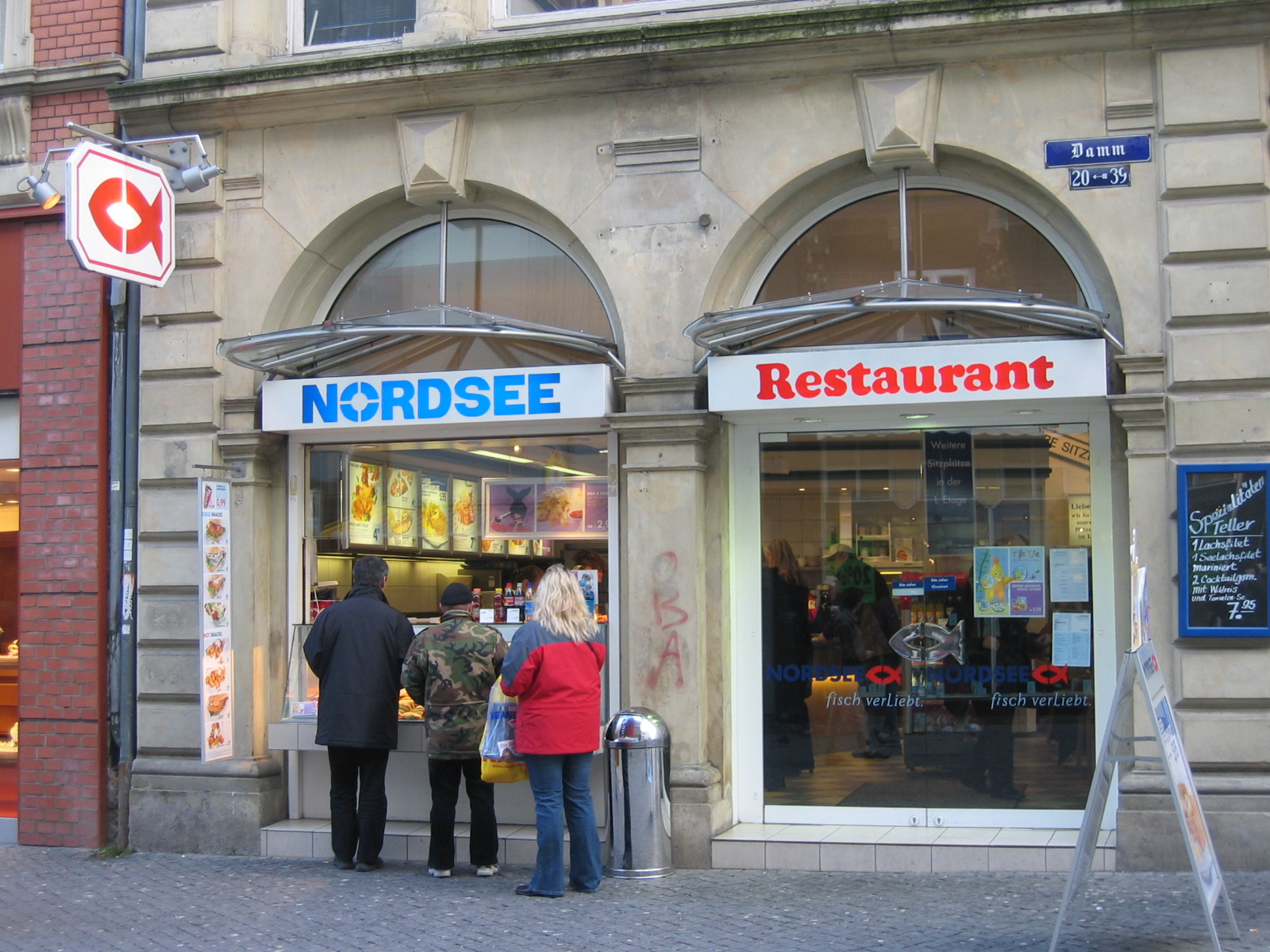
Nordsee restaurant in Braunschweig, Germany

Nordsee GmbH is a German fast-food restaurant chain specialising in seafood. In addition to selling raw and smoked seafood, the company also sells a wide variety of meals and products prepared from seafood such as Fischbrötchen (fish sandwiches), salads, and canned seafood. The company formerly supplied its own seafood but has since sold the fishery.

== History ==
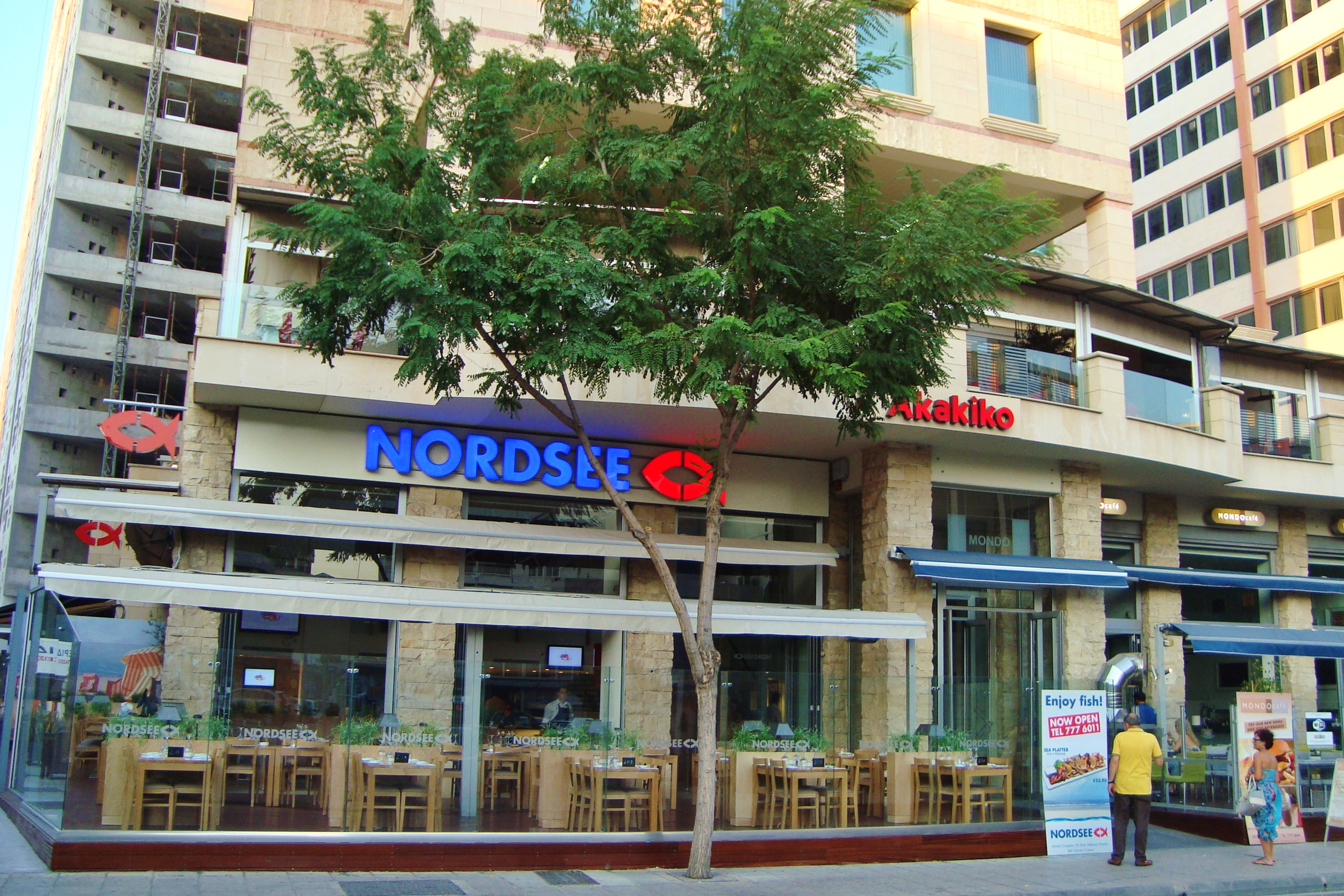
Nordsee restaurant in Makariou Avenue, Nicosia, Cyprus

Nordsee was founded in 1896 as "German steam-fishery company Nordsee" (German: Deutsche Dampffischerei-Gesellschaft Nordsee) to supply seafood from the North Sea to the residents of Bremen.

Unilever invested in the company in 1937, and owned 49% of its shares by 1941. Unilever increased its shareholding from 1960 and Nordsee became fully integrated into Unilever's German business.

In 1964 the company opened restaurant type retail shops offering meals prepared from seafood in addition to raw seafood. This concept, known as Nordsee Quick, was a huge success as nearly 300 shops opened within 2 years.

Between 1986 and 1995, the fishing fleet was spun off and in 1990, the retail and wholesale units were split into restaurants, retail, and a wholesale frozen fish business. Unilever sold the business in 1997.

In 1998, the company sold the fisheries division known as Deutsche See to allow for more focus towards seafood retailing. The new focus was demonstrated with the introduction of locations serving smaller, quicker takeout meals in the following year.

In 2005 the company was sold to Kamps Food Retail Investments and Nomura International. The company underwent restructuring and experienced a growth in profits five times greater than expected in the first year. In response to a new emerging market, the company introduced sushi and a number of other higher quality food products the following year and has begun to move into other sectors of the food industry with success.

In October 2018, Nordsee was sold to Swiss investment fund Kharis Capital.

== Operations ==
Nordsee restaurants are usually located in populated areas such as city centers or near airports and train stations. The company focuses primarily on Germany and Austria with additional locations in the Zurich and Geneva, Switzerland, Bratislava, Slovakia, as well as in Romania, with three restaurants in Bucharest and one in Cluj-Napoca.

Nordsee previously franchised operations in several other countries, including the Czech Republic, Hungary, Cyprus, the United Arab Emirates, Egypt, Bulgaria, Turkey, and Russia. In Belgium the brand formerly operated under the name "Happy Fish".

In 2016, Nordsee achieved a revenue of over €350 million. As of 2020, there were 370 Nordsee franchises.

== See also ==
- List of seafood restaurants
