= James S. Kerr =

Scottish music publisher (1841–1893)

- Born: c. 1841
- Died: 1893 (aged 51–52)
- Citizenship: Scotland
- Occupations: Metalworker, piano maker, music publisher
- Spouse: Mary McKerrow (m. 1873)

James Spiers Kerr (1841-1893) was a Scottish music publisher who started his working life as a Shipsmith, but became a musician, a pianoforte maker, dealer and tuner, and a music seller, as well as founding a music publishing business, which still provides copies of his important collection of four books of Scottish violin music, known as the Merry Melodies.

== Life ==
James Spiers Kerr was born around 1841, and was living at 34 Crown Street, in the Gorbals, according to the Scottish Census of 1841. His father was Alexander Kerr (b. 1798) and his mother was Jane Spiers (1807-1888) who had nine children in total. In the 1851 Scottish census, he was listed as a scholar and was still living in the Gorbals, but by 1861 the family had moved to Govan. Alexander Kerr, Jame's father, was listed as a cotton spinner in 1841 and 1851, where the first 4 children are described as cotton piecers or spinners. James and his father appear in the 1861 Scottish census with the occupation of Shipsmiths, which meant that he had become a skilled metal worker. In the 1871 Scottish census, James, aged 30, is listed as a musician, living with his mother in Govan. In 1874, James Kerr married Mary McKerrow (1848-1909), when he was 32 and she was 26, and in their marriage certificate he is described as a master pianoforte maker, which indicates that he served an apprenticeship of some years as a piano-tuner. By the time of the 1881 census, James and Mary Kerr's address was 38 Pollok Street, where Kerr’s occupation is given as "pianoforte and music seller employing 3 men and a girl." This indicates that Kerr’s business had expanded, and probably included repairing, and possibly making, or badging, pianofortes.

James S. Kerr’s first business listing is in the Post Office Directory of Glasgow (PODG) for 1872-1873, when he was a pianoforte tuner based at 14 Pollok Street. At this time, he was also operating from 42 Pollok Street, as shown in various small advertisements in the Glasgow Herald. This address may have been his pianoforte workshop or store rather than his home address. No. 14 continued as his business address until sometime before 1876-77 when the shop (or workshop and shop) moved to 322 Paisley Road (the address is also given as 320/322), in a block of shops and flats, containing several halls, one of which was used by James Orr Robertson, a teacher of dance. (Note that 318/322 Paisley Road are described as a warehouse and workshop respectively in the Glasgow valuation roll of 1885 –1886.) The post office listings show a steady expansion of Kerr’s business. From 1874 to 1876, he is listed as a pianoforte tuner and seller; then as pianoforte tuner and seller and music seller from 1876 to 1881; and finally adding music publisher to the list from 1882 onwards. In 1884, Kerr moved his business address to 314 Paisley Road, for which the rent of £40 is shown in the valuation roll for Glasgow of 1885-86. After he died, in 1893, his wife was listed as the owner until the business was sold in 1909, and the shop and publishers remained at this address under the name of ‘J. S. Kerr’ until the mid-1930s when the music shop moved to 79 Berkley Street.

== The James Kerr Publishing Business ==
Though James S. Kerr died in 1893, his music publishing business continued under the same name after his death, managed by Mary as noted above. During her ownership, overseas sales of Kerr's music were established in Australia and there were new editions of the popular piano collection of Scottish Dance music, first published in 1880, and further additions to complete the 12 books of "Kerr's Famous Collections for the Violin", which included the Merry Melodies (books I, II, X and XI.)

In the early 20th century, the business continued to print Scottish dance music composed by musicians such as Will Starr, Adam Rennie, and Jimmie Shand. In 1952, "James Kerr Music Publisher" was incorporated as Kerr Music Corporation Limited, which is currently listed at 79 Berkeley Street, Glasgow. That year the company published the well-known song, "The Northern Lights of Old Aberdeen", as sung by the Scottish tenor, Robert Wilson, who had recently become a director of the company. This song was composed by Mel and Mary Webb, who were English and had never visited Aberdeen. The Kerr Music Corporation also published a number of records of Scottish music, including performances by Jimmie Shand and Robert Wilson, amongst others.

The address ‘65 Berkeley Street, Glasgow’ is found on many copies of Kerr’s publications, indicating publication dates from 1970-1980. This was also for some years the business address for Bayley & Ferguson, music publishers. In August 1980, Mrs Ruby Anderson, co-director of the new organisation called "Kerr’s Music Corp." announced in the Aberdeen Press and Journal that five of the oldest music businesses in Scotland had been brought together to "operate from modern premises in Berkeley Street". By August 1982 Kerr’s Music Publishing had returned to 79 Berkeley Street.
