= Franks Casket =

Anglo-Saxon carved chest

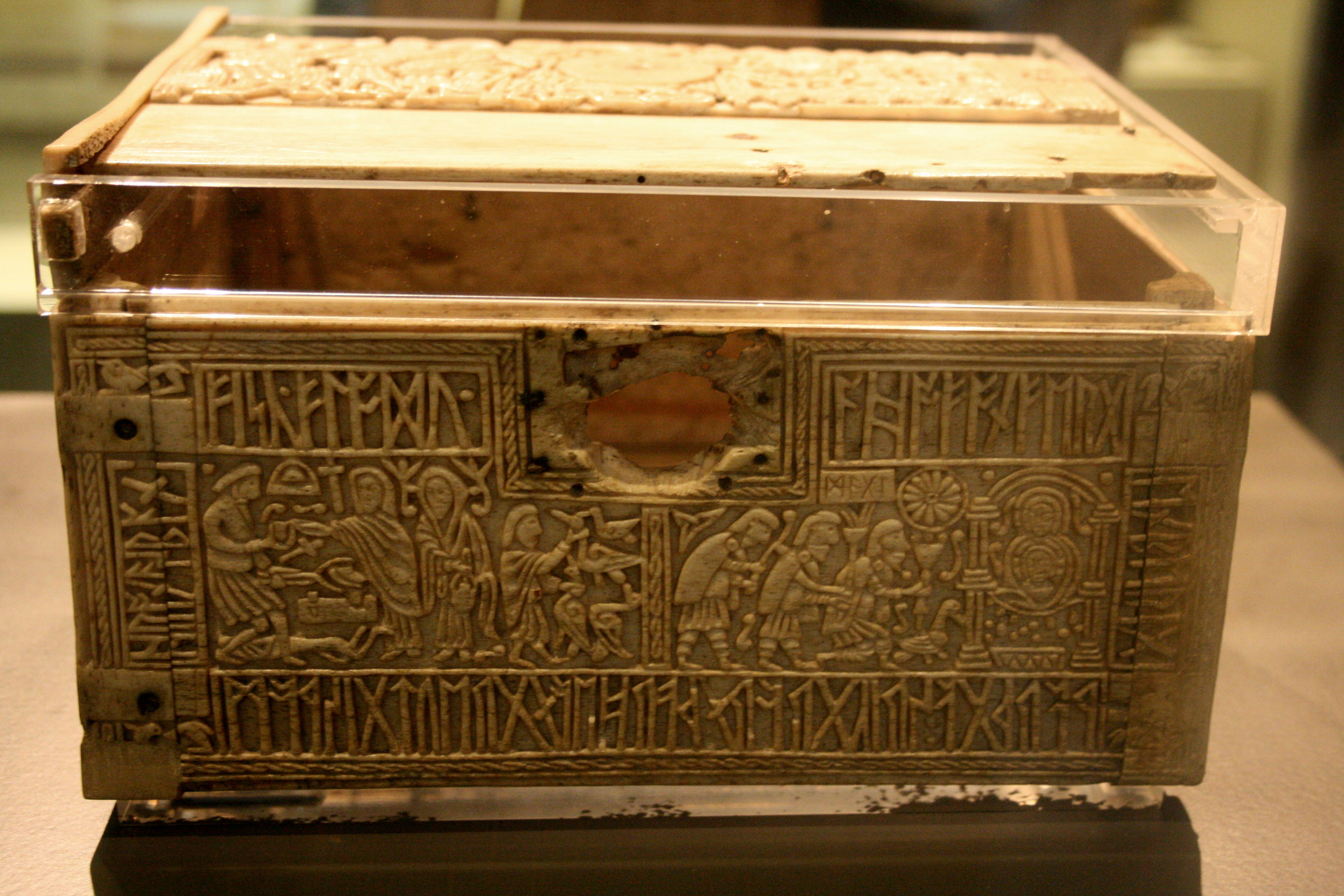
The Franks Casket, as displayed in the British Museum; the front and lid

The Franks Casket (or the Auzon Casket) is a small Anglo-Saxon whale's bone (not "whalebone" in the sense of baleen) chest from the early 8th century, now in the British Museum. The casket is densely decorated with knife-cut narrative scenes in flat two-dimensional low-relief and with inscriptions mostly in Anglo-Saxon runes. Generally thought to be of Northumbrian origin, it is of unique importance for the insight it gives into early Anglo-Saxon art and culture. Both identifying the images and interpreting the runic inscriptions has generated a considerable amount of scholarship.

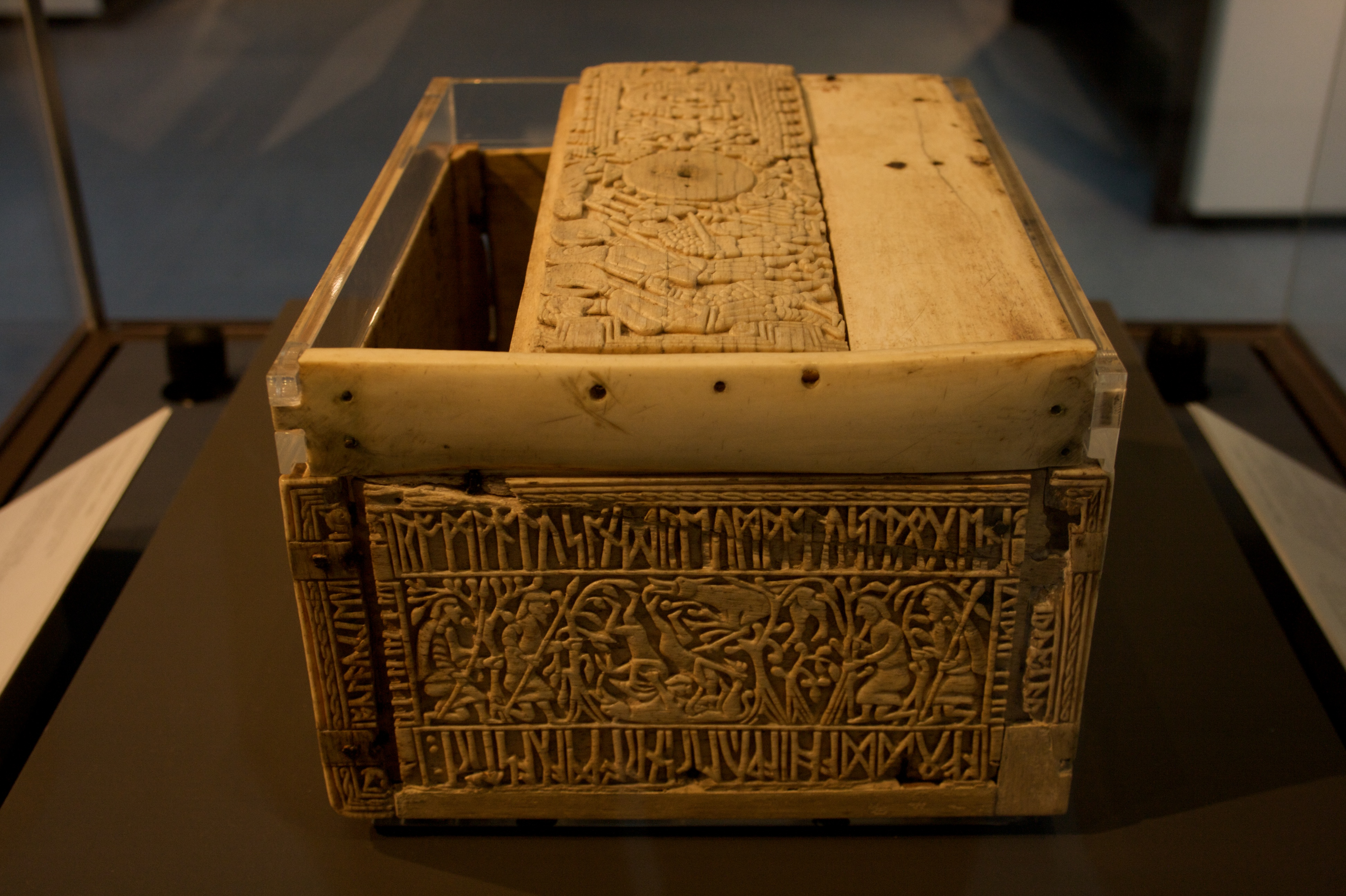
Left side and top

The imagery is very diverse in its subject matter and derivations, and includes a single Christian image, the Adoration of the Magi, along with images derived from Roman history (Emperor Titus) and Roman mythology (Romulus and Remus), as well as a depiction of at least one legend indigenous to the Germanic peoples: that of Weyland the Smith. It has also been suggested that there may be an episode from the Sigurd legend, an otherwise lost episode from the life of Weyland's brother Egil, a Homeric legend involving Achilles, and perhaps even an allusion to the legendary founding of England by Hengist and Horsa.

The inscriptions "display a deliberate linguistic and alphabetic virtuosity; though they are mostly written in Old English and in runes, they shift into Latin and the Roman alphabet; then back into runes while still writing Latin". Some are written upside down or back to front. It is named after a former owner, Sir Augustus Wollaston Franks, who gave it to the British Museum.

== History ==
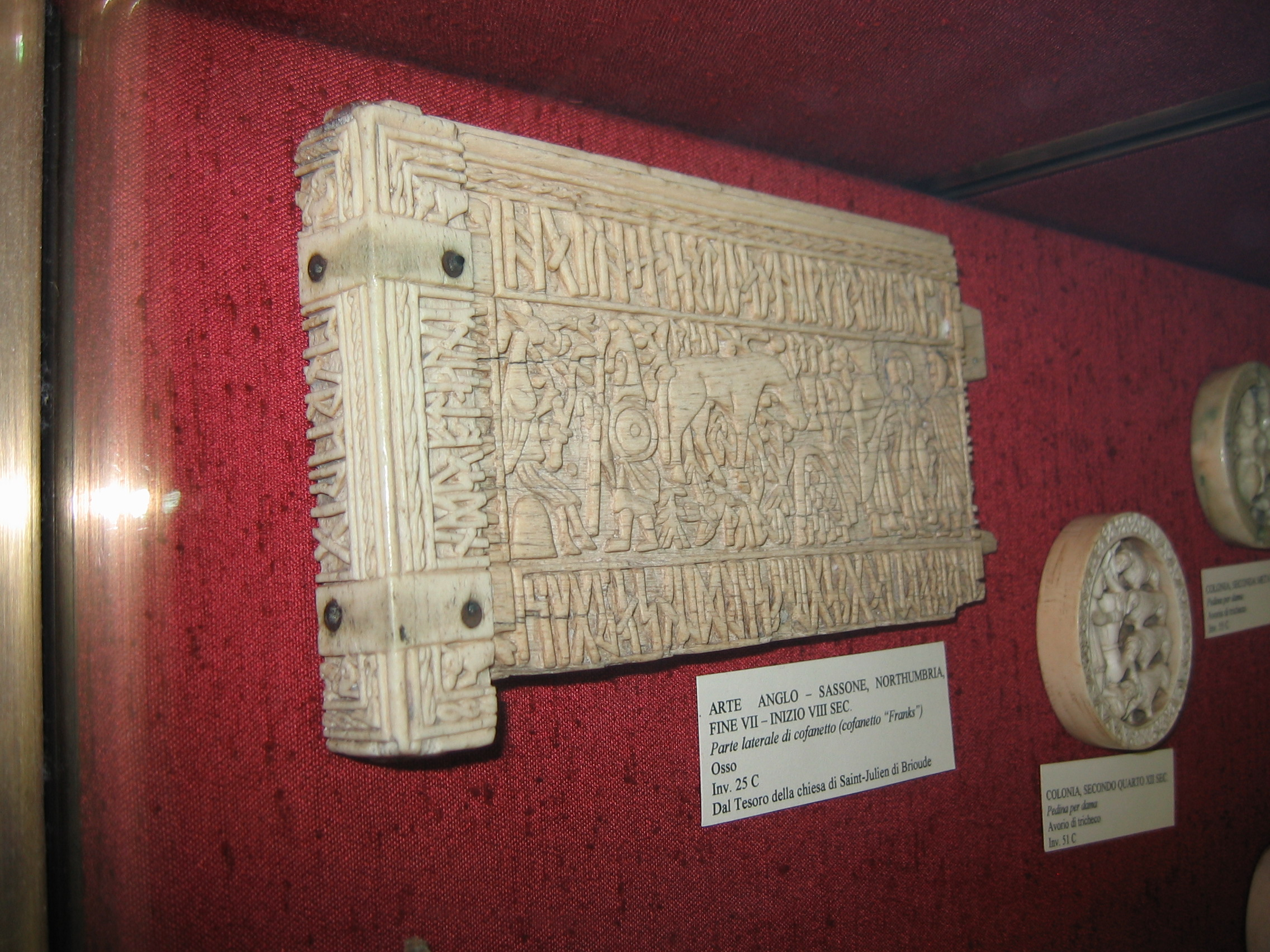
Original of right panel, on display in Bargello Museum, Florence

A monastic origin is generally accepted for the casket, which was perhaps made for presentation to an important secular figure, and Wilfrid's foundation at Ripon has been specifically suggested. The post-medieval history of the casket before the mid-19th century was unknown until relatively recently, when investigations by W. H. J. Weale revealed that the casket had belonged to the church of Saint-Julien, Brioude in Haute Loire (upper Loire region), France; it is possible that it was looted during the French Revolution. It was then in the possession of a family in Auzon, a village in Haute Loire. It served as a sewing box until the silver hinges and fittings joining the panels were traded for a silver ring. Without the support of these the casket fell apart. The parts were shown to a Professor Mathieu from nearby Clermont-Ferrand, who sold them to an antique shop in Paris, where they were bought in 1857 by Sir Augustus Wollaston Franks, who subsequently donated the panels in 1867 to the British Museum, where he was Keeper of the British and Medieval collections. The missing right end panel was later found in a drawer by the family in Auzon and sold to the Bargello Museum, Florence, where it was identified as part of the casket in 1890. The British Museum display includes a cast of it.

== Description and interpretations ==
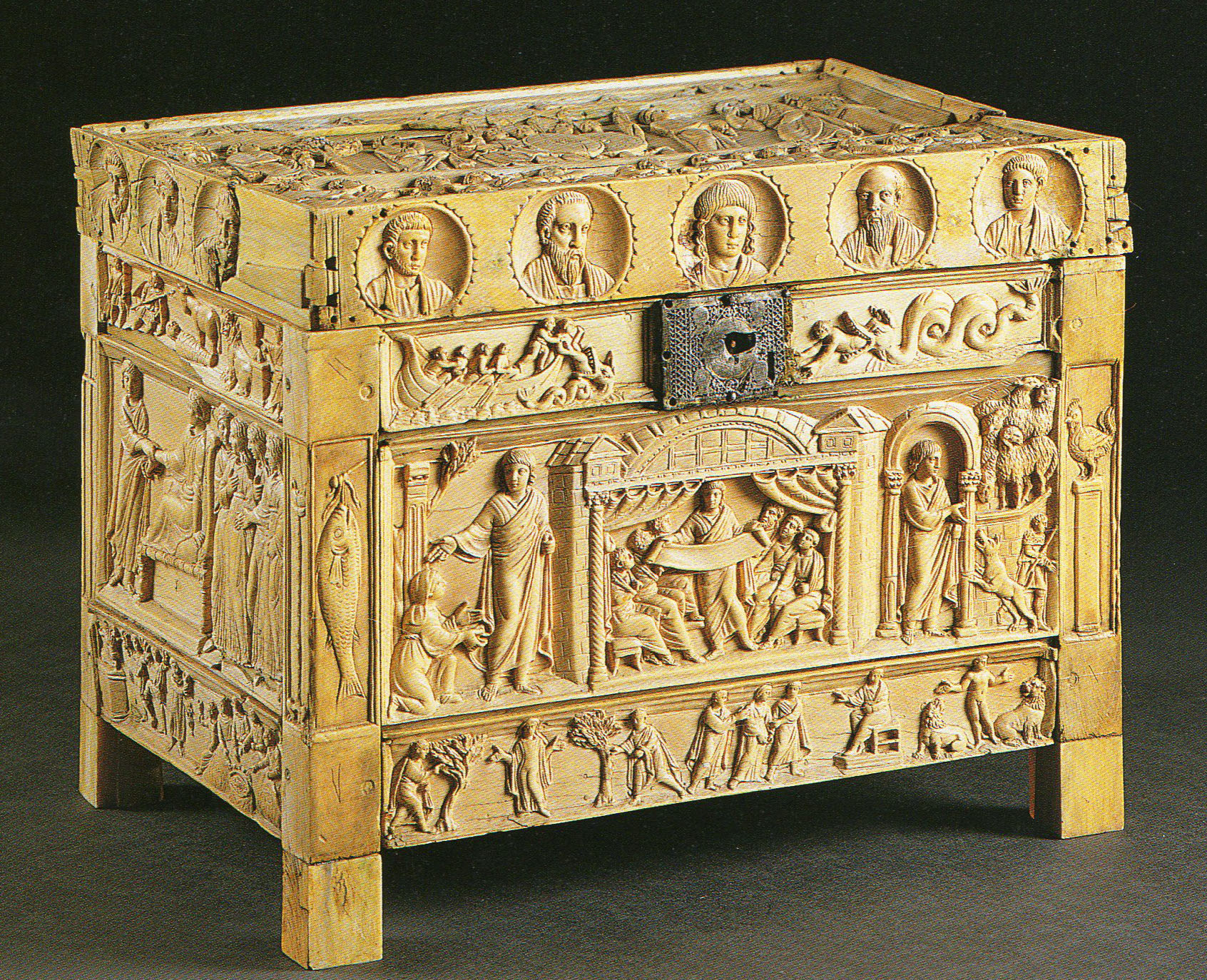
The Brescia Casket, one of the best survivals of the sort of Late Antique models the Franks Casket emulates. Late 4th century

The casket is 22.9 cm long, 19 cm wide and 10.9 cm high – 9 by 7 1/2 by 5 1/8 inches, and can be dated from the language of its inscriptions and other features to the first half of the 8th century AD. There are other inscriptions, "tituli" identifying some figures that are not detailed below and appear within the image field. The mounts in precious metal that were undoubtedly originally present are missing, and it is "likely" that it was originally painted in colour.

The chest is clearly modelled on Late Antique ivory caskets such as the Brescia Casket; the Veroli Casket in the V&A Museum is a Byzantine interpretation of the style, in revived classical style, from about 1000.

Leslie Webster regards the casket as probably originating in a monastic context, where the maker "clearly possessed great learning and ingenuity, to construct an object which is so visually and intellectually complex. ... it is generally accepted that the scenes, drawn from contrasting traditions, were carefully chosen to counterpoint one another in the creation of an overarching set of Christian messages. What used to be seen as an eccentric, almost random, assemblage of pagan Germanic and Christian stories is now understood as a sophisticated programme perfectly in accord with the Church's concept of universal history". It may have been intended to hold a book, perhaps a psalter, and intended to be presented to a "secular, probably royal, recipient"

=== Front panel ===
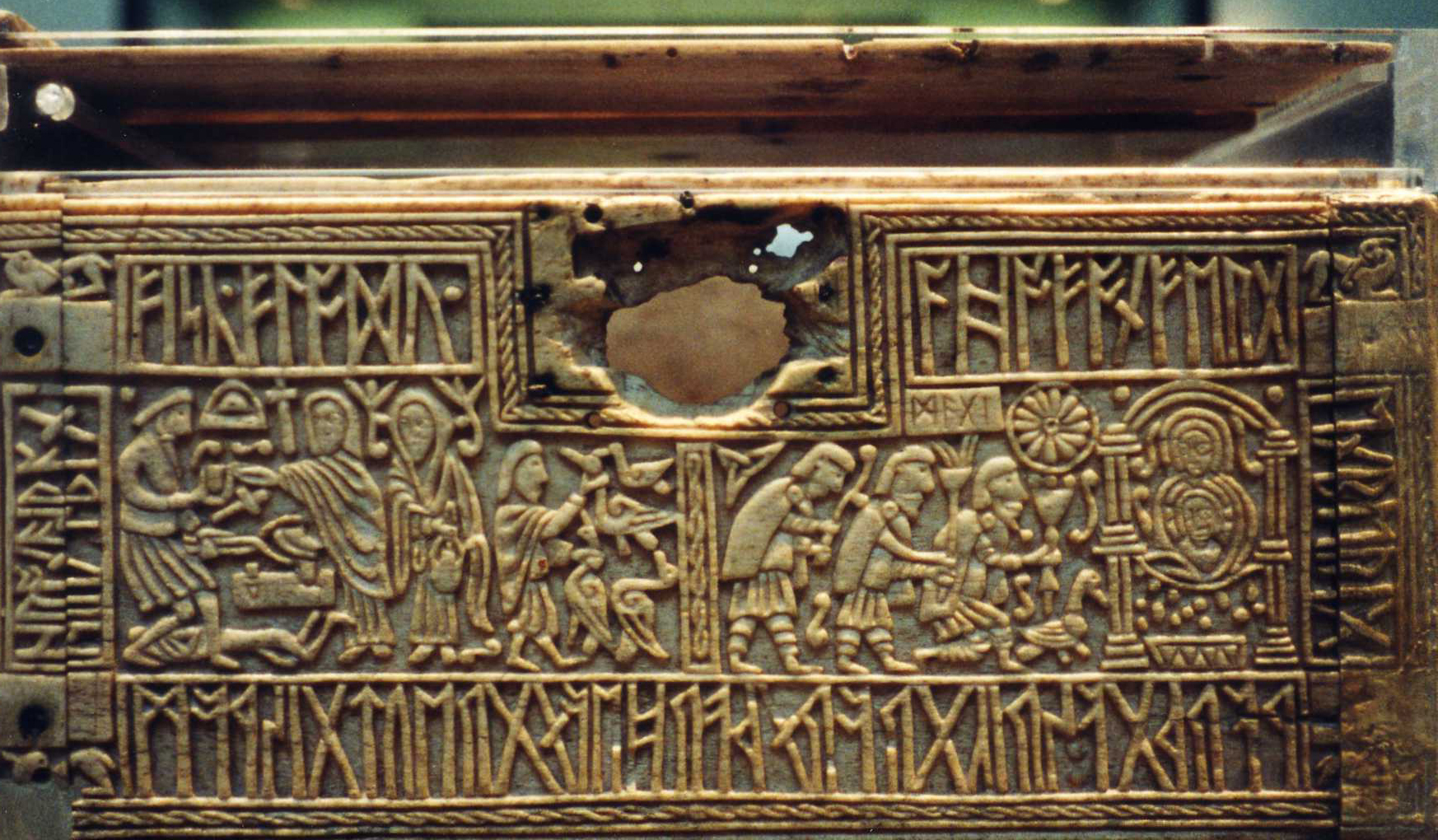
Detail of front panel, depicting the Germanic legend of Wayland the Smith and the Christian adoration of the Magi

The front panel, which originally had a lock fitted, depicts elements from the Germanic legend of Wayland the Smith in the left-hand scene, and the Adoration of the Magi on the right. Wayland (also spelled Weyland, Welund or Vølund) stands at the extreme left in the forge where he is held as a slave by King Niðhad, who has had Wayland's hamstrings cut to hobble him. Below the forge is the headless body of Niðhad's son, whom Wayland has killed, making a goblet from his skull; his head is probably the object held in the tongs in Wayland's hand. With his other hand Wayland offers the goblet, containing drugged beer, to Beaduhild, Niðhad's daughter, whom he then rapes when she is unconscious. Another female figure is shown in the centre; perhaps Wayland's helper, or Beaduhild again. To the right of the scene Wayland (or his brother) catches birds; he then makes wings from their feathers, with which he is able to escape.

In a sharp contrast, the right-hand scene shows one of the most common Christian subjects depicted in the art of the period; however here "the birth of a hero also makes good sin and suffering". The Three Magi, identified by an inscription (ᛗᚫᚷᛁ, "magi"), led by the large star, approach the enthroned Madonna and Child bearing the traditional gifts. A goose-like bird by the feet of the leading magus may represent the Holy Spirit, usually shown as a dove, or an angel. The human figures, at least, form a composition very comparable to those in other depictions of the period. Richard Fletcher considered this contrast of scenes, from left to right, as intended to indicate the positive and benign effects of conversion to Christianity.

Around the panel runs the following alliterating inscription, which does not relate to the scenes but is a riddle on the material of the casket itself as whale bone, and specifically from a stranded whale:

ᚠᛁᛋᚳ ᛫ ᚠᛚᚩᛞᚢ ᛫ ᚪᚻᚩᚠᚩᚾᚠᛖᚱᚷ ¶ ᛖᚾᛒᛖᚱᛁᚷ ¶ ᚹᚪᚱᚦᚷᚪ ᛬ ᛋᚱᛁᚳᚷᚱᚩᚱᚾᚦᚫᚱᚻᛖᚩᚾᚷᚱᛖᚢᛏᚷᛁᛋᚹᚩᛗ ¶ ᚻᚱᚩᚾᚫᛋᛒᚪᚾ
fisc · flodu · ahofonferg ¶ enberig ¶ warþga : sricgrornþærheongreutgiswom ¶ hronæsban
The flood cast up the fish on the mountain-cliff. The terror-king became sad where he swam on the shingle. Whale's bone.

=== Left panel ===
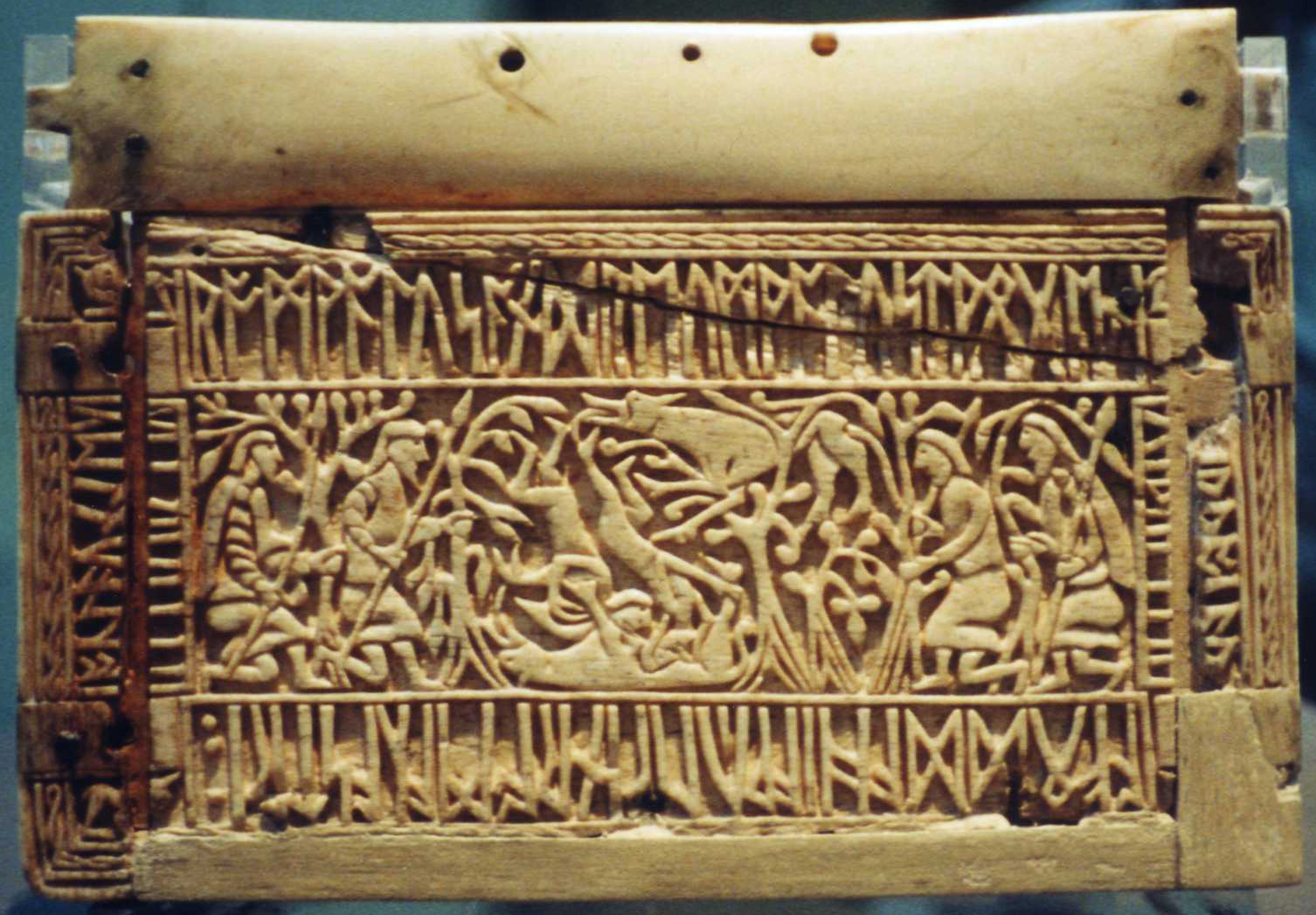
The left panel, depicting Romulus and Remus

The left panel depicts the mythological twin founders of Rome, Romulus and Remus, being suckled by a she-wolf lying on her back at the bottom of the scene. The same wolf, or another, stands above, and there are two men with spears approaching from each side. The inscription reads:

transcription of runes	transliteration of runes	standardised to Late West Saxon	possible translation
ᚱᚩᛗᚹᚪᛚᚢᛋᚪᚾᛞᚱᛖᚢᛗᚹᚪᛚᚢᛋᛏᚹᛟᚷᛖᚾ ¶ ᚷᛁᛒᚱᚩᚦᚫᚱ ¶ ᚪᚠᛟᛞᛞᚫᚻᛁᚫᚹᚣᛚᛁᚠᛁᚾᚱᚩᛗᚫᚳᚫᛋᛏᚱᛁ ᛬ ¶ ᚩᚦᛚᚫᚢᚾᚾᛖᚷ	romwalusandreumwalus twœgen ¶ gibroðær ¶ afœddæhiæ wylifinromæcæstri : ¶ oþlæunneg	Rōmwalus and Rēomwalus, twēgen gebrōðera: fēdde hīe wylf in Rōmeceastre, ēðle unnēah.	Romulus and Remus, two brothers, a she-wolf nourished them in Rome, far from their native land.

Carol Neuman de Vegvar (1999) observes that other depictions of Romulus and Remus are found in East Anglian art and coinage (for example the very early Undley bracteate). She suggests that because of the similarity of the story of Romulus and Remus to that of Hengist and Horsa, the brothers who were said to have founded England, "the legend of a pair of outcast or traveller brothers who led a people and contributed to the formation of a kingdom was probably not unfamiliar in the 8th-century Anglo-Saxon milieu of the Franks Casket and could stand as a reference to destined rulership."

=== Rear panel ===
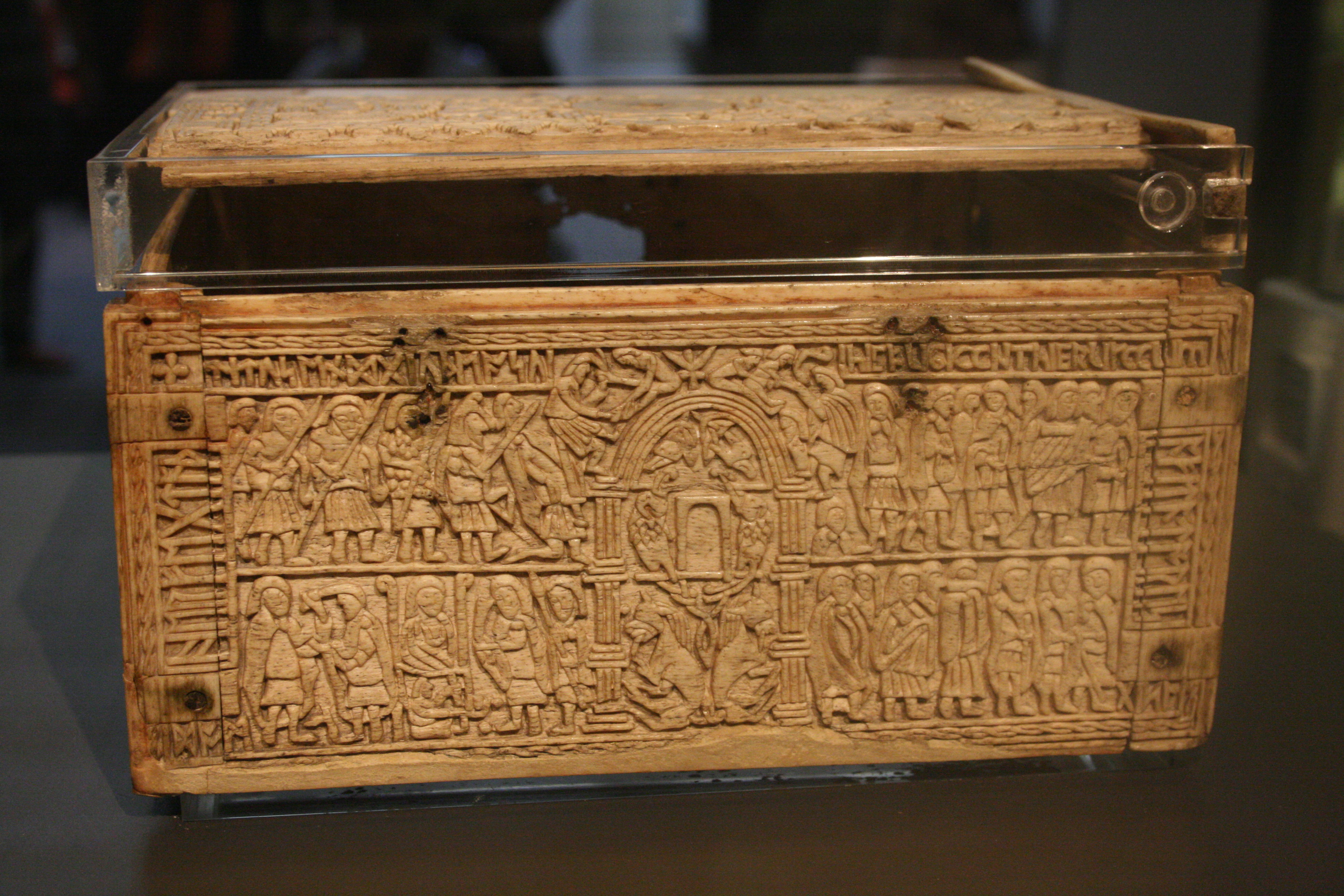
The rear panel, depicting a scene from the First Jewish-Roman War

The rear panel depicts the Taking of Jerusalem by Titus in the First Jewish-Roman War. The inscription is partly in Old English and partly in Latin, and part of the Latin portion is written in Latin letters (indicated below in upper case letters), with the remainder transcribed phonetically into runic letters. Two isolated words stand in the lower corners.

At the centre of the panel is a depiction of a building, probably representing the Temple of Jerusalem.

In the upper left quadrant, the Romans, led by Titus in a helm with a sword, attack the central building. The associated text reads 'ᚻᛖᚱᚠᛖᚷᛏᚪᚦ | ᛭ᛏᛁᛏᚢᛋᛖᚾᛞᚷᛁᚢᚦᛖᚪᛋᚢ' (in Latin transliteration herfegtaþ | +titusendgiuþeasu, and if normalised to Late West Saxon 'Hēr feohtaþ Tītus and Iūdēas'): 'Here Titus and the Jews fight'.

In the upper right quadrant, the Jewish population flee, casting glances backwards. The associated text, which is in Latin and partly uses Latin letters and partly runes, reads 'HICFUGIANTHIERUSALIM | ᚪᚠᛁᛏᚪᛏᚩᚱᛖᛋ' (in normalised Classical Latin: 'hic fugiant Hierusalim habitatores'): 'Here the inhabitants flee from Jerusalem'.

In the lower left quadrant, a seated judge announces the judgement of the defeated Jews, which as recounted in Josephus was to be sold into slavery. The associated text, in the bottom left corner of the panel, reads 'ᛞᚩᛗ' (if normalised to Late West Saxon: 'dōm'): 'judgement'.

In the lower right quadrant, the slaves/hostages are led away, with the text, in the bottom right corner of the panel, reading 'ᚷᛁᛋᛚ' (if normalised to Late West Saxon: 'gīsl'): 'hostages'.

=== Lid ===
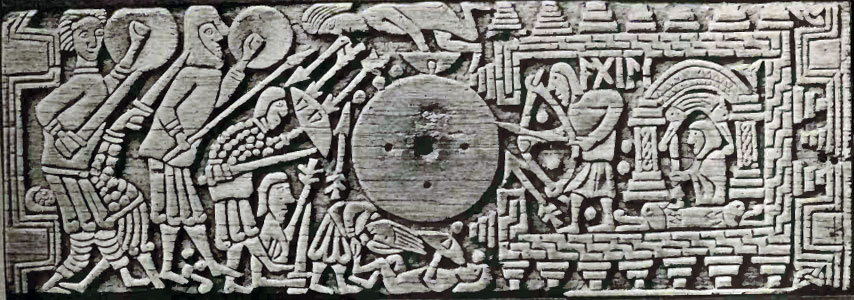
The lid of the casket is said by some to depict an otherwise lost legend of Egil; Egil fends off an army with bow and arrow while the female behind him may be his wife Olrun. Others interpret it as a scene from the Trojan War involving Achilles

The lid as it now survives is incomplete. Leslie Webster has suggested that there may have been relief panels in silver making up the missing areas. The empty round area in the centre probably housed the metal boss for a handle. The lid shows a scene of an archer, labelled ᚫᚷᛁᛚᛁ or Ægili, single-handedly defending a fortress against a troop of attackers, who from their larger size may be giants.

In 1866, Sophus Bugge "followed up his explanation of the Weland picture on the front of the casket with the suggestion that the bowman on the top piece is Egil, Weland's brother, and thinks that the 'carving tells a story about him of which we know nothing. We see that he defends himself with arrows. Behind him appears to sit a woman in a house; possibly this may be Egil's spouse Ölrún.'" In Norse mythology, Egil is named as a brother of Weyland (Weland), who is shown on the front panel of the casket. The Þiðrekssaga depicts Egil as a master archer and the Völundarkviða tells that he was the husband of the swan maiden Olrun. The Pforzen buckle inscription, dating to about the same period as the casket, also makes reference to the couple Egil and Olrun (Áigil andi Áilrun). The British Museum webpage and Leslie Webster concur, the former stating that "The lid appears to depict an episode relating to the Germanic hero Egil and has the single label ægili = 'Egil'."

Josef Strzygowski (quoted by Viëtor 1904) proposed instead that the lid represents a scene pertaining to the fall of Troy, but did not elaborate. Karl Schneider (1959) identifies the word Ægili on the lid as an Anglo-Saxon form of the name of the Greek hero Achilles. As nominative singular, it would indicate that the archer is Achilles, while as dative singular it could mean either that the citadel belongs to Achilles, or that the arrow that is about to be shot is meant for Achilles. Schneider himself interprets the scene on the lid as representing the massacre of Andromache's brothers by Achilles at Thebes in a story from the Iliad, with Achilles as the archer and Andromache's mother held captive in the room behind him. Amy Vandersall (1975) confirms Schneider's reading of Ægili as relating to Achilles, but would instead have the lid depict the Trojan attack on the Greek camp, with the Greek bowman Teucer as the archer and the person behind the archer (interpreted as a woman by most other authors) as Achilles in his tent.

Other authors see a Biblical or Christian message in the lid: Marijane Osborn finds that several details in Psalm 90, "especially as it appears in its Old English translation, ... may be aligned with details in the picture on the lid of the casket: the soul shielded in verse 5 and safely sheltered in the ... sanctuary in verse 9, the spiritual battle for the soul throughout, the flying missiles in verse 6 and an angelic defender in verse 11." Leopold Peeters (1996:44) proposes that the lid depicts the defeat of Agila, the Arian Visigothic ruler of Hispania and Septimania, by Roman Catholic forces in 554 A.D. According to Gabriele Cocco (2009), the lid most likely portrays the story of Elisha and Joas from 2 Kings 13:17, in which the prophet Elisha directs King Joas to shoot an arrow out an open window to symbolise his struggle against the Syrians: "Hence, the Ægili-bowman is King Joas and the figure under the arch is Elisha. The prophet would then be wearing a hood, typical of Semitic populations, and holding a staff." Webster (2012b:46-8) notes that the two-headed beast both above and below the figure in the room behind the archer also appears beneath the feet of Christ as King David in an illustration from an 8th-century Northumbrian manuscript of Cassiodorus, Commentary on the Psalms.

=== Right panel ===
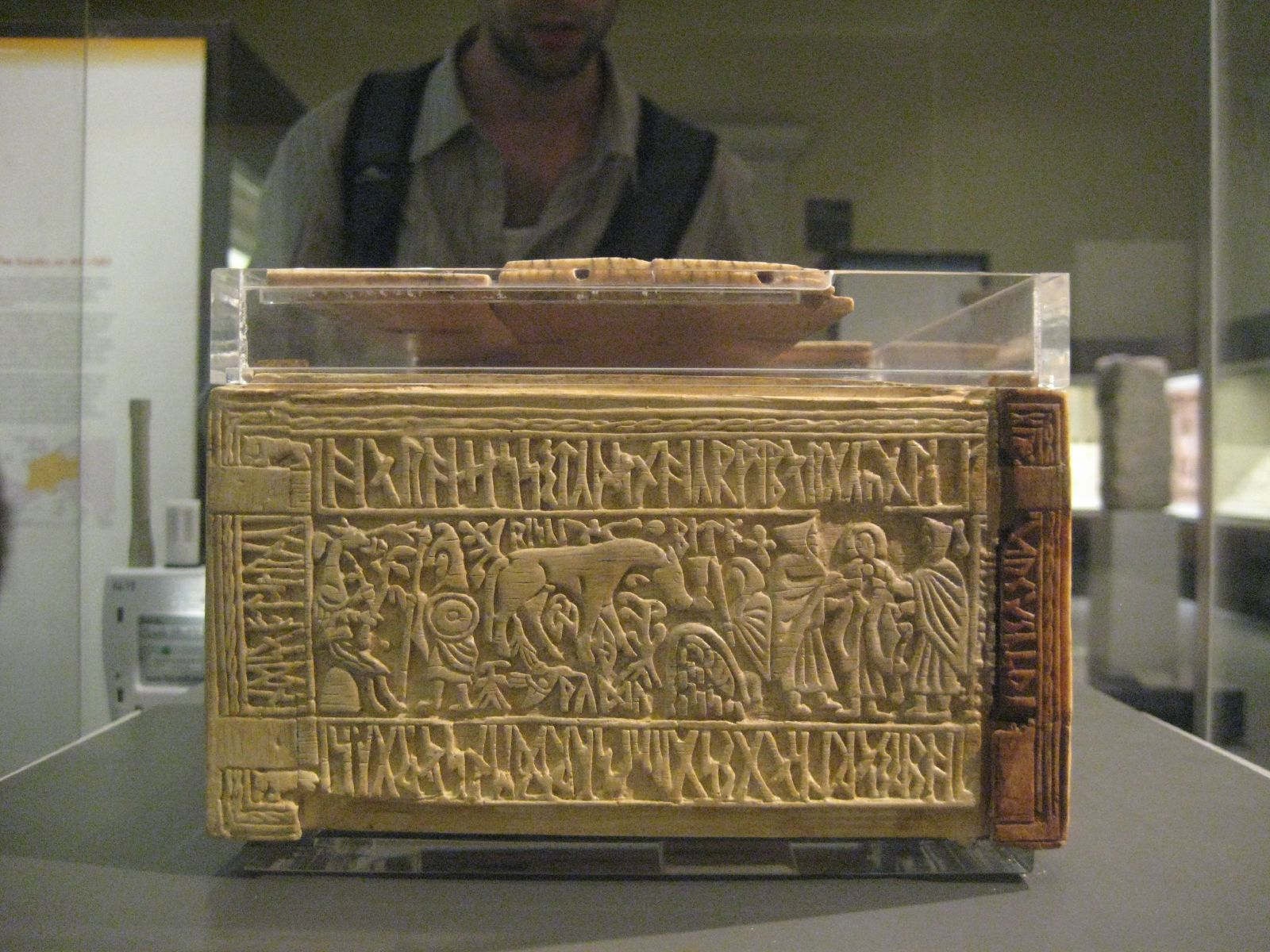
The replica right panel in London

This, the Bargello panel, has produced the most divergent readings of both text and images, and no reading of either has achieved general acceptance. At left an animal figure sits on a small rounded mound, confronted by an armed and helmeted warrior. In the centre a standing animal, usually seen as a horse, faces a figure, holding a stick or sword, who stands over something defined by a curved line. On the right are three figures.

Raymond Page reads the inscription as

transliteration of runes	standardised to Late West Saxon	possible translation
herhos(?) sitæþ on hærmberge ¶ agl? drigiþ ¶ swa hiri ertae gisgraf særden sorgæ ¶ and sefa tornæ risci ¶ wudu ¶ bita	Hēr Hōs siteþ on hearmbeorge: agl[?] drīgeþ swā hire Erta gescræf sār-denn sorge and sefan torne. rixe / wudu / bita	Here Hos sits on the sorrow-mound; She suffers distress as Ertae had imposed it upon her, a wretched den (?wood) of sorrows and of torments of mind. rushes / wood / biter

However, a definitive translation of the lines has met with difficulty, partly because the runes are run together without separators between words, and partly because two letters are broken or missing. As an extra challenge for the reader, on the right panel only, the vowels are encrypted with a simple substitution cipher. Three of the vowels are represented consistently by three invented symbols. However, two additional symbols represent both a and æ, and according to Page, "it is not clear which is which or even if the carver distinguished competently between the two." Reading one rune, transcribed by Page and others as r but which is different from the usual r-rune, as a rune for u, Thomas A. Bredehoft has suggested the alternative reading

Her Hos sitæþ on hæum bergæ
agl[.] drigiþ, swæ hiri Eutae gisgraf
sæuden sorgæ and sefa tornæ.

Here sits Hos on [or in] the high hill [or barrow];
she endures agl[.] as the Jute appointed to her,
a sæuden of sorrow and troubles of mind.

Page writes, "What the scenes represent I do not know. Excited and imaginative scholars have put forward numbers of suggestions but none convinces." Several of these theories are outlined below.

==== Sigurd and Grani? ====
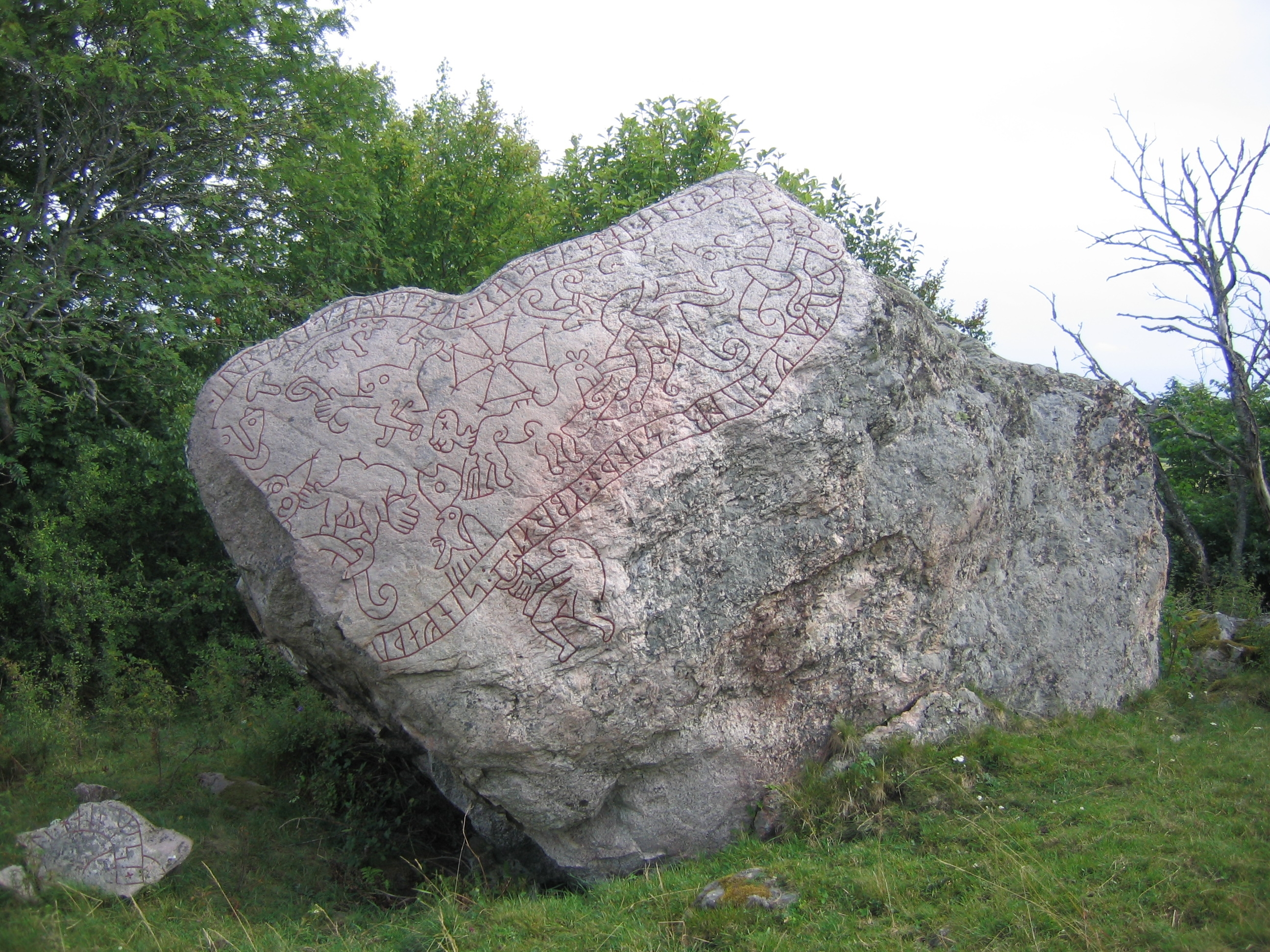
A "Sigurd stone" from eastern Sweden depicts Sigurd's horse Grani.

Elis Wadstein (1900) proposed that the right panel depicts the Germanic legend of Sigurd, known also as Siegfried, being mourned by his horse Grani and wife Guthrun. Eleanor Clark (1930) added, "Indeed, no one seeing the figure of the horse bending over the tomb of a man could fail to recall the words of the Guthrunarkvitha (II,5):

The head of Grani was bowed to the grass,
The steed knew well his master was slain."

While Clark admits that this is an "extremely obscure legend," she assumes that the scene must be based on a Germanic legend, and can find no other instance in the entire Norse mythology of a horse weeping over a dead body. She concludes that the small, legless person inside the central mound must be Sigurd himself, with his legs gnawed off by the wolves mentioned in Guthrun's story. She interprets the three figures to the right as Guthrun being led away from his tomb by his slayers Gunnar and Hogne, and the female figure before Grani as the Norn-goddess Urd, who passes judgement on the dead. The warrior to the left would then be Sigurd again, now restored to his former prime for the afterlife, and "sent rejoicing on his way to Odainsaker, the realms of bliss for deserving mortals. The gateway to these glittering fields is guarded by a winged dragon who feeds on the imperishable flora that characterised the place, and the bodyless cock crows lustily as a kind of eerie genius loci identifying the spot as Hel's wall."

Although the Sigurd-Grani thesis remains the most widely accepted interpretation of the right panel, Arthur Napier remarked already in 1901, "I remain entirely unconvinced by the reasons [Wadstein] puts forward, and believe that the true explanation of the picture has still to be found."

==== Hengist and Horsa? ====
The White horse of Kent is said to be based on the banner of Horsa

A.C. Bouman (1965) and Simonne d'Ardenne (1966) instead interpret the mournful stallion (Old English hengist) at the centre of the right panel as representing Hengist, who, with his brother Horsa, first led the Old Saxons, Angles, and Jutes into Britain, and eventually became the first Anglo-Saxon king in England, according to both Bede's Ecclesiastical History of the English People and the Anglo-Saxon Chronicle. The miniature person inside the burial mound he grieves over would then be Horsa, who died at the battle of Ægelesthrep in 455 A.D. and was buried in a flint tumulus at Horsted near Aylesford. Bouman suggests that the female mourner could then be Hengist's famous daughter Renwein.

Bouman and d'Ardenne identify the strange creature on the left with the head of a horse, the clothing and posture of a man, and the wings of a spirit, as Horsa again, this time as a spirit seated on his own burial mound. Horsa (whose name means horse in Old English) would then be the "Hos" referred to in the panel's inscription as sitting on a "sorrow-mound." They note that there is a miniature horse in each corner of the panel, in keeping with its theme of two famous "horses."

==== The Deity of the Grove? ====
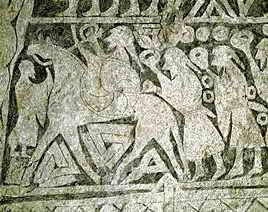
The Tängelgårda stone from Gotland, Sweden depicts two valknuts between the horse's legs, as on the right panel of the Franks Casket

Usually herhos sitæþ is read, "here sits the horse". However, Wilhelm Krause (1959) instead separates herh (temple) and os (divinity). Alfred Becker (1973, 2002, 2023), following Krause, interprets herh as a sacred grove, the site where in pagan days the Æsir were worshipped, and os as a goddess or valkyrie. On the left, a warrior "has met his fate in guise of a frightening monster... As the outcome, the warrior rests in his grave shown in the middle section. There (left of the mound) we have a horse marked with two trefoils, the divine symbols.... Above the mound we see a chalice and right of the mound a woman with a staff in hand. It is his Valkyrie, who has left her seat and come to him in the shape of a bird. Now she is his beautiful sigwif, the hero's benevolent, even loving companion, who revives him with a draught from that chalice and takes him to Valhalla. The horse may be Sleipnir, Woden's famous stallion."

Krause and Becker call attention to the significance of the two trefoil marks or valknutr between the stallion's legs, which denote the realm of death and can be found in similar position on picture stones from Gotland, Sweden like the Tängelgårda stone and the Stora Hammars stones. Two other pictures of the Franks Casket show this symbol. On the front it marks the third of the Magi, who brings myrrh. It also appears on the lid, where according to Becker, Valhalla is depicted.

==== The Madness of Nebuchadnezzar? ====
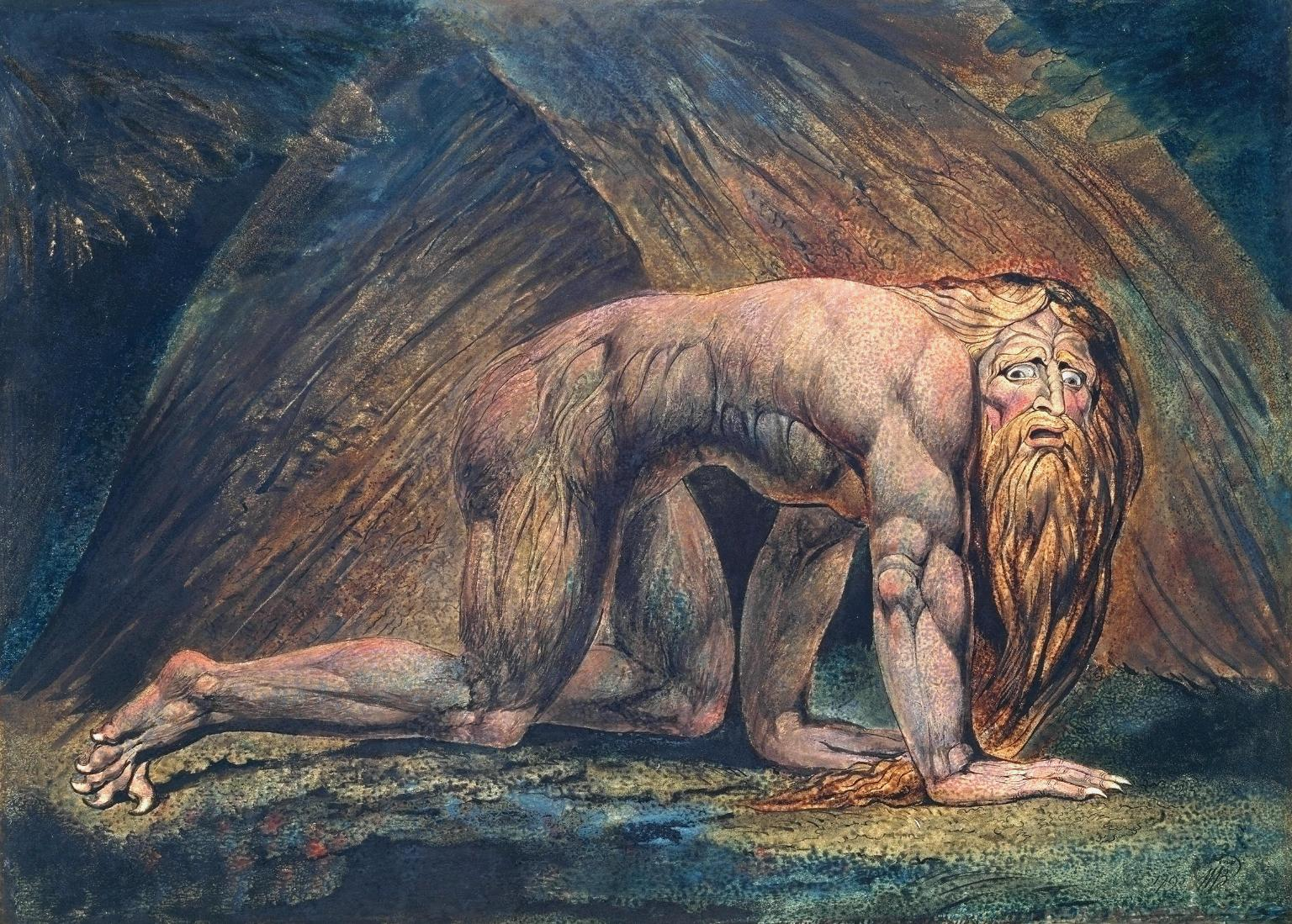
“Nebuchadnezzar” by William Blake (Tate)

Leopold Peeters (1996) proposes that the right panel provides a pictorial illustration of the biblical Book of Daniel, ch. 4 and 5: The wild creature at the left represents Nebuchadnezzar after he “was driven away from people and given the mind of an animal; he lived with the wild asses and ate grass like cattle.” The figure facing him is then the “watchful one” who decreed Nebuchadnezzar's fate in a dream (4.13-31), and the quadruped in the centre represents one of the wild asses with whom he lived. Some of the details Peeters cites are specific to the Old English poem based on Daniel.

According to Peeters, the three figures at the right may then represent Belshazzar’s wife and concubines, "conducting blasphemous rites of irreverence (Dan. 5:1-4, 22)." The corpse in the central burial mound would represent Belshazzar himself, who was murdered that night, and the woman mourning him may be the queen mother. The cryptic runes on this panel may be intended to invoke the mysterious writing that appeared on the palace wall during these events.

==== The Death of Balder? ====
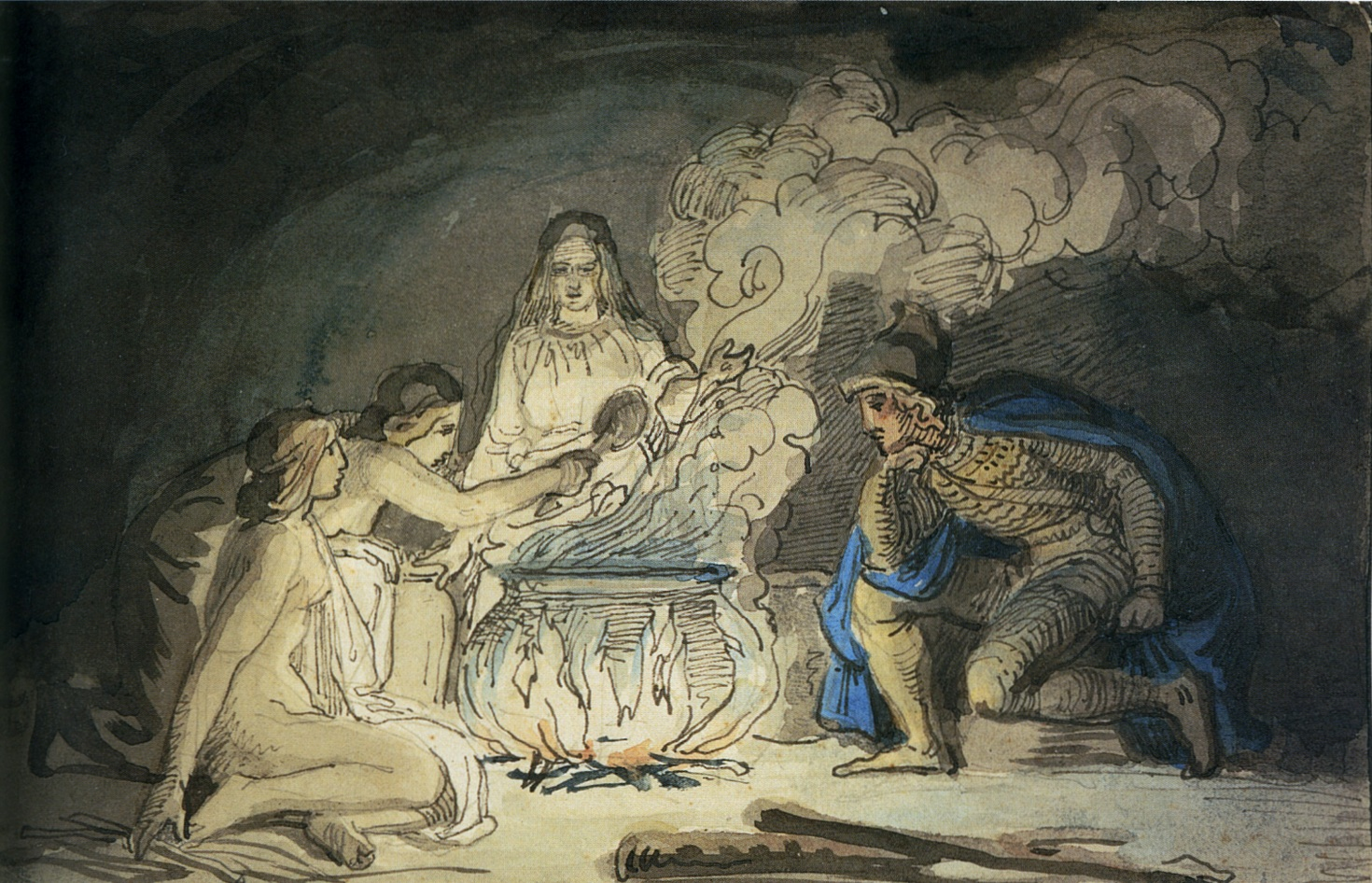
Hother and the wood maidens by Lorenz Frølich

David Howlett (1997) identifies the illustrations on the right panel with the story of the death of Balder, as told by the late 12th-century Danish historian Saxo Grammaticus in his Gesta Danorum. According to Saxo, Balder's rival Hother meets three women in a dank wood late at night, who provide him with a belt and girdle that will enable him to defeat Balder. Hother wounds Balder, who dies three days later and is buried in a mound.

Howlett identifies the three figures at the right with the three wood maidens (who may be the three Norns), and the shrouded man within the central mound with Balder. “The woman to the right of the mound is Hel, Saxo’s Proserpina, prophesying Balder’s death and condemning Woden to sorrow and humiliation. The stallion to the left of the mound is Balder’s father Woden.” In Saxo's story, Woden then begets a second son, Boe (Bous or Váli), to avenge Balder's death. Howlett interprets the warrior at left as Boe, and “one infers that the mound is depicted twice and that the stallion mourning in the centre of the panel is identical with the figure seated at the left end, where he retains his horse’s head and hooves.”

==== The Penance of Rhiannon? ====
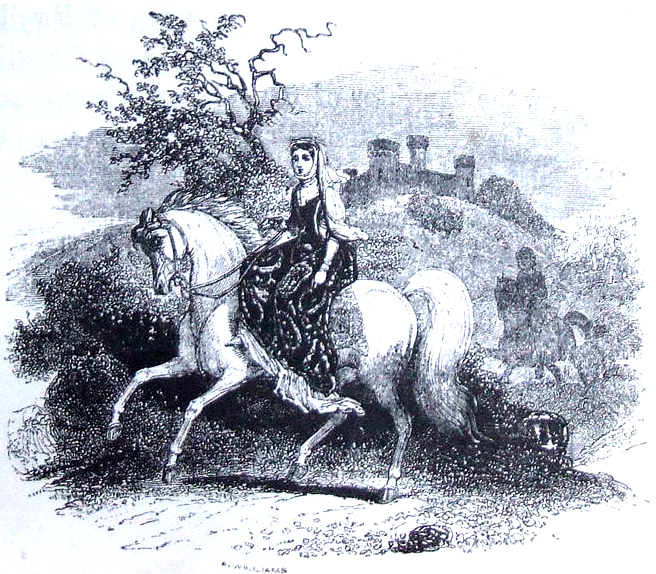
Rhiannon riding in Arbeth, from The Mabinogion, translated by Charlotte Guest, 1877

Ute Schwab (2008), following Heiner Eichner (1991), interprets the left and central scenes on the right panel as relating to the Welsh legend of Rhiannon. According to the Mabinogion, a medieval collection of ancient Welsh stories, Rhiannon was falsely accused of murdering and eating her infant son Pryderi, who, according to Schwab, is represented by the swaddled infant in the central scene. As a penance, she was required, as depicted in the scene on the left, "to sit beside the horse-block outside the gates of the court for seven years, offering to carry visitors up to the palace on her back, like a beast of burden.... Rhiannon's horse-imagery and her bounty have led scholars to equate her with the Celtic horse-goddess Epona."

==== Satan and the Nativity? ====
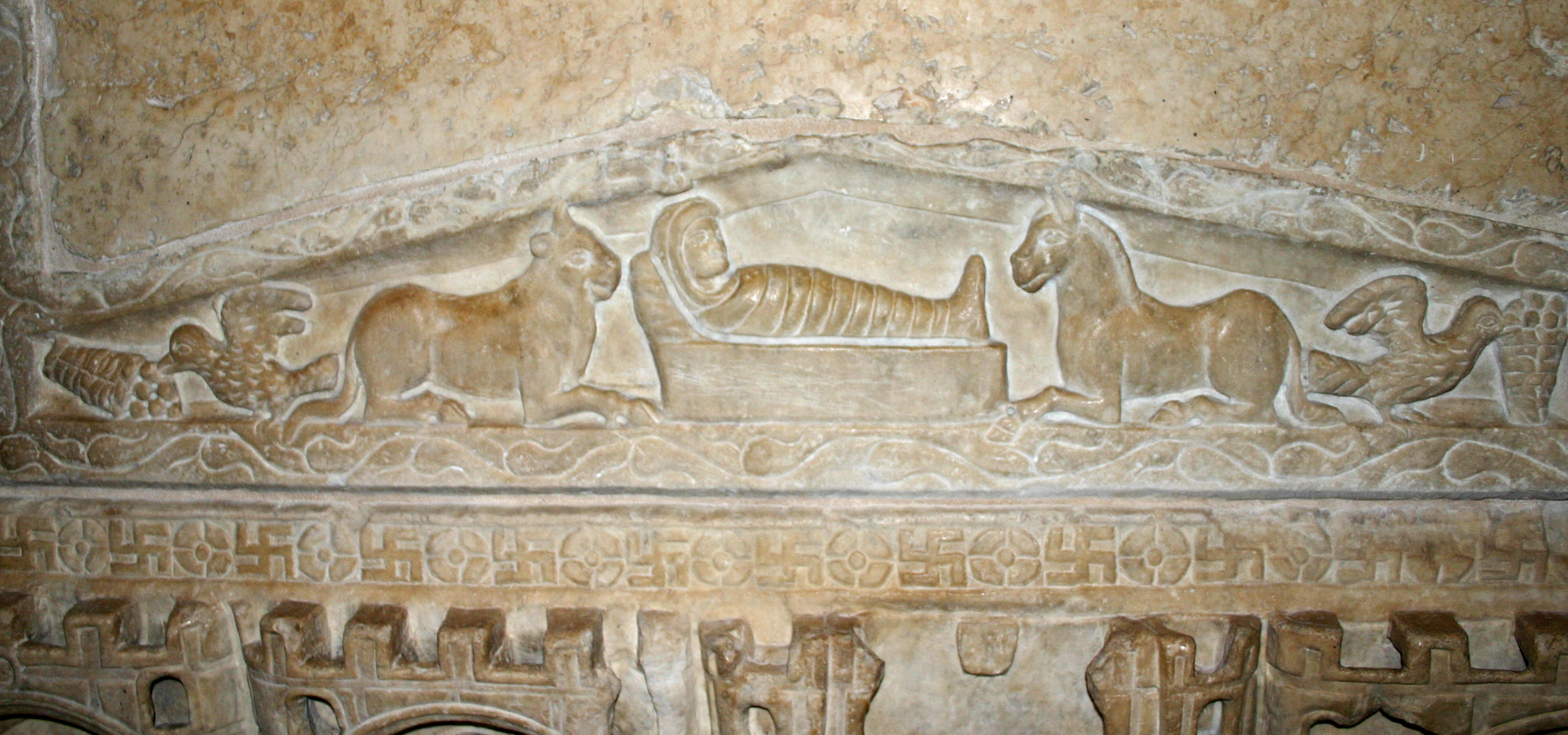
Nativity scene, 4th-century Roman Christian sarcophagus

Austin Simmons (2010) parses the frame inscription into the following segments:

herh os-sitæþ on hærm-bergæ
agl drigiþ swæ hiri er tae-gi-sgraf
sær-den sorgæ and sefa-tornæ

This he translates, "The idol sits far off on the dire hill, suffers abasement in sorrow and heart-rage as the den of pain had ordained for it." Linguistically, the segment os- represents the verbal prefix oþ- assimilated to the following sibilant, while in the b-verse of the second line er "before" is an independent word before a three-member verbal compound, tae-gi-sgraf. The first member tae- is a rare form of the particle-prefix to-.

The inscription refers specifically to the scene on the left end of the casket's right side. According to Simmons, the 'idol' (herh) is Satan in the form of an ass, being tortured by a personified Hell in helmet. The scene is a reference to the apocryphon Decensus ad Inferos, a popular medieval text translated into Anglo-Saxon. In one version of the story of the Harrowing of Hell, a personified Hell blames Satan for having brought about the Crucifixion, which has allowed Christ to descend to Hell's kingdom and free the imprisoned souls. Therefore, Hell tortures Satan in retribution. Simmons separates the other scenes on the right side and interprets them as depictions of the Nativity and the Passion.

== Runological and numerological considerations ==
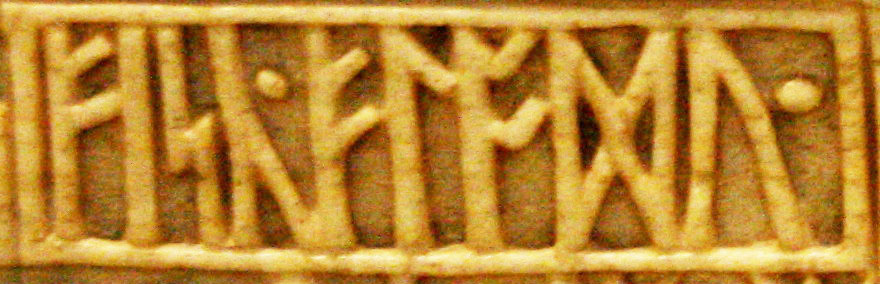
The inscription ᚠᛁᛋᚳ᛫ᚠᛚᚩᛞᚢ᛫ "Fisc Flodu …" on the front of the Franks Casket alliterates on the F-rune ᚠ feoh, which connotes wealth or treasure

Each Anglo-Saxon runic letter had an acrophonic Old English name, which gave the rune itself the connotations of the name, as described in the Old English rune poem. The inscriptions on the Franks Casket are alliterative verse, and so give particular emphasis to one or more runes on each side. According to Becker (1973, 2002, 2023), these tell a story corresponding to the illustrations, with each of the scenes emblematic of a certain period of the life and afterlife of a warrior-king: The front inscription alliterates on both the F-rune ᚠ feoh (wealth) and the G-rune ᚷ gyfu (gift), corresponding to the jewellery produced by the goldsmith Welund and the gifts of the three Magi. “In this box our warrior hoarded his treasure, golden rings and bands and bracelets, jewellery he had received from his lord, … which he passed to his own retainers… This is feohgift, a gift not only for the keep of this or that follower, but also to honour him in front of his comrade-in-arms in the hall.” The Romulus and Remus inscription alliterates on the R-rune ᚱ rad (journey or ride), evoking both how far from home the twins had journeyed and the owner's call to arms. The Titus side stresses the T-rune ᛏ Tiw (the Anglo-Saxon god of victory), documenting that the peak of a warrior-king's life is glory won by victory over his enemies. The right side alliterates first on the H-rune ᚻ hagal (hail storm or misfortune) and then on the S-rune ᛋ sigel (sun, light, life), and illustrates the hero's death and ultimate salvation, according to Becker.

Becker also presents a numerological analysis of the inscriptions, finding 72 = 3 x 24 signs on the front and left panels, and a total of 288 or 12 x 24 signs on the entire casket. All these numbers are multiples of 24 = 3 x 8, the magical number of runes in the elder futhark, the early continental runic alphabet preserved within the extended Anglo-Saxon futhorc. "In order to reach certain values the carver had to choose quite unusual word forms and ways of spelling which have kept generations of scholars busy."

Osborn (1991a, 1991b) concurs that the rune counts of 72 are intentional. However, "whereas [Becker] sees this as indicating pagan magic, I see it as complementing such magic, as another example of the Franks Casket artist adapting his pagan materials to a Christian evangelical purpose in the mode of interpretatio romana. The artist manipulates his runes very carefully, on the front of the casket supplementing their number with dots and on the right side reducing their number with bindrunes, so that each of the three inscriptions contains precisely seventy-two items.... The most obvious Christian association of the number seventy-two, for an Anglo-Saxon if not for us, is with the missionary disciples appointed by Christ in addition to the twelve apostles.... The number of these disciples is mentioned in scripture only in Luke 10, and there are two versions of this text; whereas the Protestant Bible says that Christ appointed a further seventy disciples, the Vulgate version known to the Anglo-Saxons specifies seventy-two. In commenting on that number, Bede associates it with the mission to the Gentiles (that is, "all nations"), because seventy-two is the number of nations among the Gentiles, a multiple of the twelve tribes of Israel represented by the twelve apostles."

== Glossary ==
This is a glossary of the Old English words on the casket, excluding personal names. Definitions are selected from those in Clark Hall's dictionary.

Transliteration of runes on casket	Form normalised to Late West Saxon	Headword form (nominative singular for substantives, infinitive for verbs)	Meaning
agl[?]	āglǣc?	This word is a mystery, but often emended to āglǣc (neuter noun)	trouble, distress, oppression, misery, grief
ahof	āhōf	āhebban (strong verb)	lift up, stir up, raise, exalt, erect
and, end	and	and (conjunction)	and
ban	bān	bān (neuter noun)	bone, tusk
bita	bita	bita (masculine noun)	biter, wild beast
den (occurring in the string særden)	denn	denn (neuter noun)	den, lair, cave
dom	dōm	dōm (masculine noun)	doom, judgment, ordeal, sentence; court, tribunal, assembly
drigiþ	drīgeþ	drēogan (strong verb)	experience, suffer, endure, sustain, tolerate
oþlæ	ēðle	ēðel (masculine/neuter noun)	country, native land, home
fœddæ	fēdde	fēdan (weak verb)	feed, nourish, sustain, foster, bring up
fegtaþ	feohtaþ	feohtan (strong verb)	fight, combat, strive
fergenberig	firgenberig	firgenbeorg (feminine noun)	mountain?
fisc	fisc	fisc (masculine noun)	fish
flodu	flōd	flōd (masculine/neuter noun)	mass of water, flood, wave; flow (of tide as opposed to ebb), tide, flux, current, stream
gasric	gāsrīc(?)	gāsrīc? (masculine noun)	savage person?
gibroðæra	gebrōðera	brōðor (masculine noun)	brother
gisgraf	gescræf	gescræf (neuter noun)	cave, cavern, hole, pit
giswom	geswam	geswimman (strong verb)	swim, float
gisl	gīsl	gīsl (masculine noun)	hostage
greut	grēot	grēot (neuter noun)	grit, sand, earth
grorn	grorn	grorn (adjective)	sad, agitated
he	hē	hē (personal pronoun)	he
hærmberge	hearmbeorge	hearmbeorg (feminine noun)	grave?
herh (possibly occurring in the string herhos)	hearg	hearg (masculine noun)	temple, altar, sanctuary, idol; grove?
her	hēr	hēr (adverb)	here
hiæ	hīe	hē/hēo/þæt (personal pronoun)	he/she/it
hiri	hire	hēo (personal pronoun)	she
hronæs	hranes	hran (masculine noun)	whale
in	in	in (preposition)	in, into, upon, on, at, to, among
giuþeasu	Iūdēas	Iūdēas (masculine plural)	the Jews
on	on	on (preposition)	on, upon, on to, up to, among; in, into, within
os (possibly occurring in the string herhos)	ōs	ōs (masculine noun)	a divinity, god
romæcæstri	Rōmeceastre	Rōmeceaster (feminine noun)	the city of Rome
risci	risce	risc (feminine noun)	rush
sær (occurring in the string særden)	sār	sār (neuter noun)	bodily pain, sickness; wound, sore, raw place; suffering, sorrow, affliction
sefa	sefan	sefa (masculine noun)	mind, spirit, understanding, heart
sitæþ	siteþ	sittan (strong verb)	sit, sit down, recline
sorgæ	sorge	sorg (feminine noun)	sorrow, pain, grief, trouble, care, distress, anxiety
swa	swā	swā (adverb)	so as, consequently, just as, so far as, in such wise, in this or that way, thus, so that, provided that
tornæ	torne	torn (neuter noun)	anger, indignation; grief, misery, suffering, pain
twœgen	twēgen	twēgen (numeral)	two
unneg	unnēah	unnēah (adjective)	not near, far, away from
warþ	wearþ	weorðan (strong verb)	become
wudu	wudu	wudu (masculine noun)	wood, forest, grove
wylif	wylf	wylf (feminine noun)	she-wolf
þær	þǣr	þǣr (adverb)	there; where

== See also ==
- Anglo-Saxon runes
- Old English rune poem
- Ruthwell Cross

== Literature ==
- Richard Abels, “What Has Weland to Do with Christ? The Franks Casket and the Acculturation of Christianity in Early Anglo-Saxon England.” Speculum 84, no. 3 (July 2009), 549–581.
- Alfred Becker, "Franks Casket Revisited," Asterisk, A Quarterly Journal of Historical English Studies, 12/2 (2003), 83-128.
- Alfred Becker, "The Virgin and the Vamp," Asterisk, A Quarterly Journal of Historical English Studies, 12/4 (2003), 201-209.
- Alfred Becker, "A Magic Spell "powered by" a Lunisolar Calendar," Asterisk, A Quarterly Journal of Historical English Studies, 15 (2006), 55 -73.
- M. Clunies Ross, A suggested Interpretation of the Scene depicted on the Right-Hand Side of the Franks Casket, Medieval Archaeology 14 (1970), pp. 148–152.
- Jane Hawkes and Susan Mills (editors), Northumbria's Golden Age (1999); with articles by L. Webster, James Lang, C. Neuman de Vegvar on various aspects of the casket.
- W. Krogmann, "Die Verse vom Wal auf dem Runenkästchen von Auzon," Germanisch-Romanische Monatsschrift, N.F. 9 (1959), pp. 88–94.
- J. Lang, "The Imagery of the Franks Casket: Another Approach," in J. Hawkes & S. Mills (ed.) Northumbria’s Golden Age (1999) pp. 247 – 255
- K. Malone, "The Franks Casket and the Date of Widsith," in A.H. Orrick (ed.), Nordica et Anglica, Studies in Honor of Stefán Einarsson, The Hague 1968, pp. 10–18.
- Th. Müller-Braband, Studien zum Runenkästchen von Auzon und zum Schiffsgrab von Sutton Hoo; Göppinger Arbeiten zur Germanistik 728 (2005)
- M. Osborn, "The Grammar of the Inscription on the Franks Casket, right Side," Neuphilologische Mitteilungen 73 (1972), pp. 663–671.
- M. Osborn, The Picture-Poem on the Front of the Franks Casket, Neuphilologische Mitteilungen 75 (1974), pp. 50–65.
- P. W. Souers, "The Top of the Franks Casket," Harvard Studies and Notes in Philology and Literature, 17 (1935), pp. 163–179.
- P. W. Souers, "The Franks Casket: Left Side," Harvard Studies and Notes in Philology and Literature, 18 (1936), pp. 199–209.
- P. W. Souers, "The Magi on the Franks Casket," Harvard Studies and Notes in Philology and Literature, 19 (1937), pp. 249–254.
- P. W. Souers, "The Wayland Scene on the Franks Casket," Speculum 18 (1943), pp. 104–111.
- K. Spiess, "Das angelsächsische Runenkästchen (die Seite mit der Hos-Inschrift)," in Josef Strzygowski-Festschrift, Klagenfurt 1932, pp. 160–168.
- L. Webster, "The Iconographic Programme of the Franks Casket," in J. Hawkes & S. Mills (ed.) Northumbria’s Golden Age (1999), pp. 227 – 246
- L. Webster, "Stylistic Aspects of the Franks Casket," in R. Farrell (ed.), The Vikings, London 1982, pp. 20–31.
- A. Wolf, "Franks Casket in literarhistorischer Sicht," Frühmittelalterliche Studien 3 (1969), pp. 227–243.
