= Carr =

Carr may refer to:

== Places ==
=== United States ===
- Carr, Colorado, an unincorporated community
- Carr, North Carolina, an unincorporated community
- Carr Township, Clark County, Indiana
- Carr Township, Jackson County, Indiana
- Carr Township, Durham County, North Carolina
- Carr Inlet, Washington state
- Carr River, Rhode Island
- Carr Valley, Wisconsin

=== Elsewhere ===
- Carr (landform), a north European wetland, a fen overgrown with trees
- Carr, South Yorkshire, England, United Kingdom
- Cape Carr, Wilkes Land, Antarctica
- Mount Carr, Canada

== Businesses ==
- Carr Amplifiers, manufacturer of guitar amplifiers, United States
- Carr Communications, Ireland
- Carrier Global (New York Stock Exchange symbol CARR), American manufacturer of HVAC systems

== People and fictional characters ==
- Carr (given name), includes a list of people with the given name
- Carr (surname), includes list of people and fictional characters with the surname
- Carr baronets, an extinct title in the Baronetage of England

== Other uses ==
- USS Carr, a US Navy frigate
- Carr Center for Human Rights Policy, a research center of the Kennedy School of Government at Harvard University

== See also ==
- Carr Bank, hamlet in Cumbria, England, United Kingdom
- Carr Fire, a fire in the Redding, California area in 2018
- Carr index, an indicator of the compressibility of a powder
- Carr's, English manufacturers of water biscuits
- Car (disambiguation)
- KARR (disambiguation)
- Carrs (disambiguation)
