= Karr (surname) =

Family name

Karr is a Gaelic surname derived from the Old Norse Kjarr. The surname Carr and its variants date back to the Battle Abbey Roll from 1066 after the Anglo Norman invasion of William the Conqueror. The surname appears in the Old Norse genealogical section of the Flateyjarbók the largest medieval Icelandic manuscript. In Skáldskaparmál, Snorri Sturluson lists Kjarr as a descendant of Auði, the founder of the Ödling dynasty. In the Heimskringla by Snorri Sturluson, Valland is mentioned several times as the Old Norse name for Gaul. It was the country where Rollo carved out Normandy: Kjárr, usually a king of the Valir. Kíarr/Kjárr is generally recognized to stem from Latin Caesar. Early Scandinavian links with Gothic regions suggest it also could have come from Greek kaîsar, perhaps through Gothic Kaiser. The Scottish variant being Kerr and the Irish variant being Carr from the Celtic word ciar which was derived from O'Ciarain or O'Ceirin. The word car itself is an anglicized variation from the Gaulish word carros; a wheeled cart or chariot.

== People ==
- Barry Karr, executive director for Center for Inquiry
- Benn Karr (1893–1968), pitcher in Major League Baseball
- Bill Karr (1911–1979), American football end
- Carmen Karr (1865–1943), Catalan feminist, journalist, writer, and musicologist
- David Karr (1918–1979)
- Gary Karr (1941–2025), American classical double bass player and teacher
- Jean-Baptiste Alphonse Karr (1808–1890), French critic, journalist and novelist
- Jerry Karr (1936–2019), American farmer and politician
- John Mark Karr, former suspect in the JonBenét Ramsey murder case
- Mariana Karr (1949–2016), Argentine-Mexican actress
- Mary Karr (born 1955), American poet and memoirist
- Ron Karr, American speaker, marketing consultant and author

== Fictional characters ==
- Mike Karr, in the soap opera The Edge of Night
- Dr. Emerie Karr, a clone scientist in the second season of Star Wars: The Bad Batch

== See also ==
- KARR (disambiguation)
- Karra (name)
- Kerr (surname)
- Carr (surname)
- Kar (suffix)
