= Carrs =

Carrs or Carr's may refer to:

- Carr (landform), north European wetland, a fen overgrown with trees
- The Carrs, an area in Durham, England
- Carr's Landing, also named Carrs, a community in British Columbia, Canada
- Carr's, English manufacturers of water biscuits
- Carrs Quality Centers, former name of Carrs-Safeway, a food retail chain

== See also ==
- Carr (disambiguation)
