= KARR =

KARR may refer to:

- Karr (surname), including a list of people with the name
- KARR (AM), a radio station licensed to Kirkland, Washington, United States
- KARR (Knight Rider), a character from the Knight Rider series
- Aurora Municipal Airport (Illinois)'s ICAO code

== See also ==
- Carr (disambiguation)
- Kar (disambiguation)
- Karre
- Karri (disambiguation)
