= Kjárr =

Legendary figure in Germanic and Norse tradition

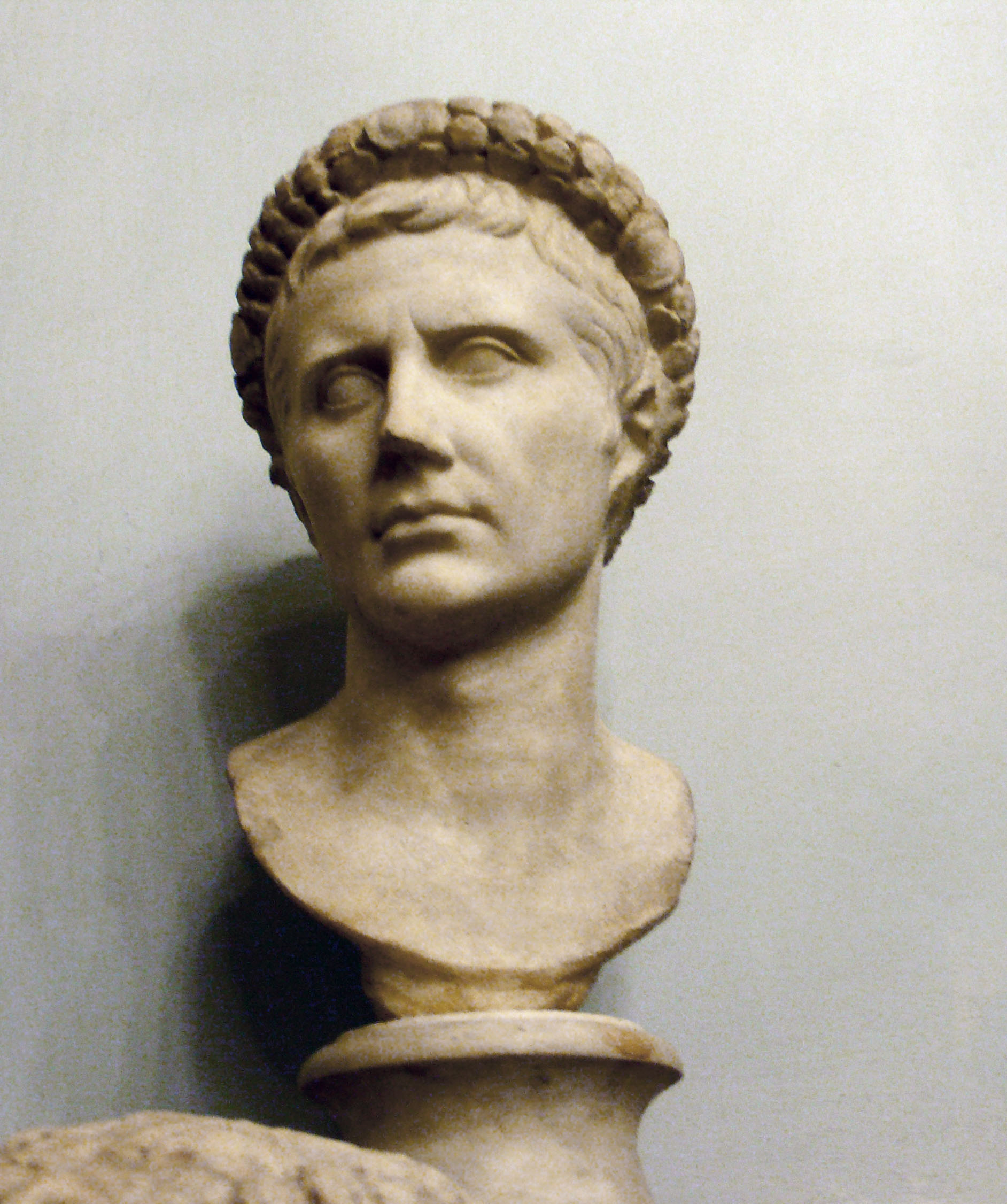
Bust of Caesar Augustus.

Kjárr, or Kíarr, is a figure of Germanic heroic legend that is believed to be the reflection of the Roman Emperors. In Old Norse sources, he appears as a king of the Valir (Celtic/Romance southerners) who were the people of Valland (the Celtic/Roman south).

Many scholars have suggested that the name is derived from Caesar, but the exact path from Caesar to Kíarr is not clear.

== Origin ==
In his Skáldskaparmál, Snorri Sturluson lists Kjárr as a descendant of Auði, the founder of the Ödling dynasty:

[...] þriði Auði, er Öðlingar eru frá komnir, [...] Af Niflunga ætt var Gjúki, af Öðlinga ætt var Kjárr, af Ylfinga ætt var Eiríkr inn málspaki.

[...] Audi, from whom the Ödlungs are come; [...] Of the Niflung's house was Gjúki; of the house of Ödlings, Kjárr; of the house of the Ylfings was Eiríkr the Wise in Speech.

In the genealogy section of Hversu Noregr byggðist, further information is provided about Auði and Kjarr. It presents Auði as the grandfather of Kjarr and as an early ruler of the Celtic/Romance southerners:

Auði hafði Valland ok var faðir Fróða, föður Kjárs, föður Ölrúnar.

Auði ruled Valland and was the father of Fróði, the father of Kjár, the father of Ölrún.

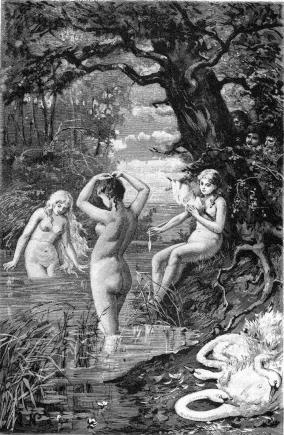
Egil marries Kjár's daughter Ölrún, a Valkyrie who dresses in swan skin. She turns out to be hard to keep.

Kjárr and his daughter Ölrún also appear in the Völundarkviða, where she is a Valkyrie who marries the master archer Egil, the brother of Wayland the Smith:

Þar váru tvær dætr Hlöðvés konungs, Hlaðguðr svanhvít ok Hervör alvitr, in þriðja var Ölrún Kjársdóttir af Vallandi. Þeir höfðu þær heim til skála með sér. Fekk Egill Ölrúnar, en Slagfiðr Svanhvítrar, en Völundr Alvitrar. Þau bjuggu sjau vetr. Þá flugu þær at vitja víga ok kómu eigi aftr. Þá skreið Egill at leita Ölrúnar, en Slagfiðr leitaði Svanhvítrar, en Völundr sat í Úlfdölum. Hann var hagastr maðr, svá at menn viti, í fornum sögum.

Two of them were daughters of King Hlothver, Hlathguth the Swan-White and Hervor the All-Wise, and the third was Olrun, daughter of Kjar from Valland. These did they bring home to their hall with them. Egil took Olrun, and Slagfith Swan-White, and Völund All-Wise. There they dwelt seven winters; but then they flew away to find battles, and came back no more. Then Egil set forth (on his snowshoes) to follow Olrun, and Slagfith followed Swan White, but Völund stayed in Ulfdalir. He was a most skillful man, as men know from old tales.

There are two other references which both place Kjarr far back in time as a contemporary of the Huns during the Age of Migrations. One of these is a poem in the Poetic Edda named Atlakviða:

Sjau eigum vit salhús sverða full, hverju eru þeira hjölt ór gulli; minn veit ek mar beztan, en mæki hvassastan, boga bekksæma, en brynjur ór gulli, hjalm ok skjöld hvítastan kominn ór höll Kíars, einn er minn betri en sé allra Húna.	Seven halls we have Fulfilled of swords, And hilts of gold Each sword there has; My horse is the best, My blade is the keenest; Fair my bow o'er the bench is, Gleams my byrny with gold; Brightest helm, brightest shield, From Kiar's dwelling ere brought -- Better all things I have Than all things of the Huns.

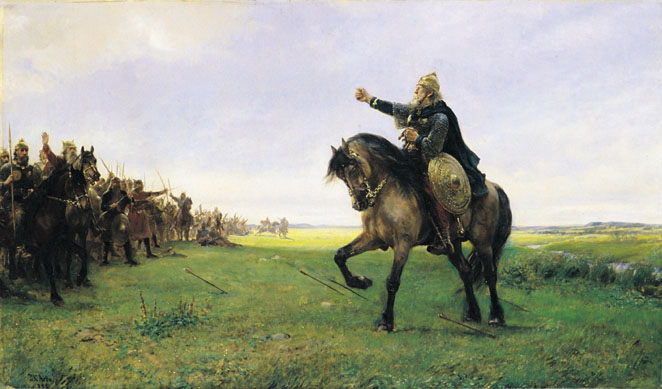
Of old, they say, Humli (to the left raising his hand) over Huns did rule, Gizur (in the foreground, challenging the Huns) the Gauts...

The second reference is in the Hervarar saga which contains a reference to Kíarr in a poem in fornyrðislag which lists the great kings of old:

Ár kvað Humla Húnum ráða, Gizur Gautum, Gotum Angantý, Valdarr Dǫnum en Vǫlum Kíarr, Alrekr enn frækni enskri þjóðu.	Of old, they say, Humli over Huns did rule, Gizur the Gauts, the Goths Angantyr, Valdar the Danes, the Romans Kjar, Alrek the Valiant the English people.

The few appearances of Kjárr stand out from the general lack of references to the Romans in the literary sources of the Germanic peoples before the arrival of Christianity.

== Etymology ==
Many scholars have suggested that the name is derived from Caesar, but the route it took to Scandinavia is not clear. It may have been transmitted through a West Germanic language, but since Scandinavia and the Goths had close connections, it may also have been borrowed from the Gothic language and ultimately from Greek. The evolution of the name would have been καισαρ → kaisar → *kēsar → Kíarr → Kiárr. A third possibility is that it originates from contacts with Rome beside the probably early borrowing Rúm in words such as Rúmverjar ("Roman soldiers").

A less common theory is that it stems from Old Irish Kíarr or from Cearbhall of Valland (Wales).

== See also ==
- Dukljan
- Karr (surname)
