= Valland =

Norse term for the lands of Celtic and Romance peoples

In Norse legend, Valland is the name of the part of Europe which is inhabited by Celtic and Romance peoples. The element Val- is derived from *Walhaz, a Proto-Germanic word whose descendants were used in various Germanic languages to refer to the inhabitants of the Western Roman Empire.

== Mythological context ==
In the genealogy section of Flateyjarbók, there are two kings of Valland named Auði and Kjárr, who may have been a late reflection of Julius Caesar and the Roman Emperors in Norse mythology:

Auði hafði Valland ok var faðir Fróða, föður Kjárs, föður Ölrúnar.

Auði ruled Valland and was the father of Fróði, the father of Kjár, the father of Ölrún.

Kjárr and his daughter Ölrún also appear in the Völundarkviða, where she is a Valkyrie who marries the hero Egil:

Þar váru tvær dætr Hlöðvés konungs, Hlaðguðr svanhvít ok Hervör alvitr, in þriðja var Ölrún Kjársdóttir af Vallandi.

Two of them were daughters of King Hlothver, Hlathguth the Swan-White and Hervor the All-Wise, and the third was Olrun, daughter of Kjar from Valland.

It is mentioned in Illuga saga Gríðarfóstra that Hringr, the king of Denmark and son of Sköld dagsson, was married to Sigrid, who was the daughter of Vilhálm - or William - king of Valland.

== Legendary and historical context ==
In the Heimskringla by Snorri Sturluson, Valland is mentioned several times as the Old Norse name for Gaul. It was the country where Rollo carved out Normandy:

Rolf Ganger went afterwards over sea to the West to the Hebrides, or Sudreys; and at last farther west to Valland, where he plundered and subdued for himself a great earldom, which he peopled with Northmen, from which that land is called Normandy.

In Hrómundar saga Gripssonar, the hero Hrómund slays an undead witch-king named Þráinn who had been the king of Valland.

== See also ==
- Blakumen
