= Alruna =

Female given name

Alruna (Old Norse Ǫlrún, Old High German Ailrun, Modern German Alruna, Alraune) is a Germanic female personal name, from Proto Germanic *aliruna (or possibly *agilruna), which is formed from runa "secret, rune" and a debated prefix that may be ali-, agil-, or alu-.

In German, Alruna was also used as a short form of Adelruna, a different name with a first element *athal- "noble".

In Germanic mythology, Ailrun is the wife of Agilaz, the legendary archer. In the poem Völundarkviða, Ölrun (possibly Old Norse "ale rune") is identified as a valkyrie, and as a daughter of Kiár of Valland.

Alruna of Cham was an 11th-century Bavarian recluse, the Roman Catholic patroness of pregnancy. It is also the name for the Mandragora or mandrake, a plant belonging to the nightshade family, in a number of Germanic languages: alruna in Swedish, alrune in Danish and Norwegian, and Alraune in German.

== See also ==
- Albruna
