= Carr Valley =

Valley in Wisconsin, United States

Coordinates: 43°32′10″N 90°10′15″W

Carr Valley [elevation: 902 feet (275 m)] is a valley in Sauk County, in the U.S. state of Wisconsin. The valley carries a stream, Carr Valley Branch.

Carr Valley was named for David Carr.
