= Carol Neuman de Vegvar =

American art historian

Carol L. Neuman de Vegvar FSA

Academic work
- Discipline: Medieval history Fine Art; Art history
- Sub-discipline: Anglo-Saxon art
- Institutions: Ohio Wesleyan University

Carol L. Neuman de Vegvar (born 1953) FSA is an art historian and Professor of Fine Arts at Ohio Wesleyan University.

== Career ==
De Vagvar undertook undergraduate study at Bryn Mawr College before completing her PhD on Anglo-Saxon art in Northumbria in 1981 at the University of Pennsylvania. She was elected as a Fellow of the Society of Antiquaries of London on 5 June 2003.

== Select publications ==
- 2008. "In Hoc Signo: The Cross on Secular Objects and the Process of Conversion", in Sarah Larratt Keefer, Karen L. Jolly, and Catherine E. Karkov (eds) Cross and Culture in Anglo-Saxon England: Studies in Honour of George Hardin Brown.Morgantown, West Virginia University Press. 79–117.
- 2007. "Converting the Insular Landscape: Crosses and Their Audiences", in Alastair Minnis and Jane Roberts (eds) Text, Image, Interpretation: Studies in Anglo-Saxon Literature in Honour of Éamonn Ó Carragáin. 407–29.
- 2006 (with Adam Daubney). "Lenton Keisby and Osgodby", Medieval Archaeology 50, 287.
- 2003. "Romanitas and Realpolitik in Cogitosus’s Description of the Church of St. Brigit, Kildare", in Martin Carver (ed) The Cross Goes North; Processes of Conversion in Northern Europe, AD 300–1300. Woodbridge, Boydell for York Medieval Press. 153–70.
- 1990. "The Origin of the Genoels-Elderen Ivories", Gesta 29(1)
