= Carr Communications =

Irish public relations and training company

- Industry: Public relations Marketing; Training
- Founded: 1973
- Founder: Bunny Carr
- Headquarters: Dublin, Ireland
- Key people: Tony Hughes (managing director); Donal Cronin (director)
- Website: carrcommunications.ie

Carr Communications is a public relations and training company in Ireland. Founded in 1973 by television presenter Bunny Carr, the firm is known for its media training services, particularly for politicians and public figures. Carr Communications has expanded into wider public relations and communications consulting, working with both private sector clients and government agencies. The company has undergone several ownership changes, including a management buyout in 2004, and has been noted for its influence on political communication in Ireland.

== History ==
It was founded in 1973 by the Irish television presenter Bunny Carr.

Under Managing Director Terry Prone, the company expanded into public relations. The company has trained politicians to appear in media, including former Taoisigh, Bertie Ahern TD, Charles Haughey and Garret Fitzgerald as well as other prominent TDs from different political parties.

The company was subject to a management buyout in 2004 and the company's profits improved substantially. In 2008, Donal Cronin and Fergus Hoban became owners of the company following the departure of a number of senior executives. Terry Prone resigned as a director of the company in February 2008 and others left with her to set up a rival company.

In February 2008, Tony Hughes rejoined the company as managing director. In March 2008, it was reported that the company received substantial government contracts for its services.
