= George Shibata =

American military officer and actor

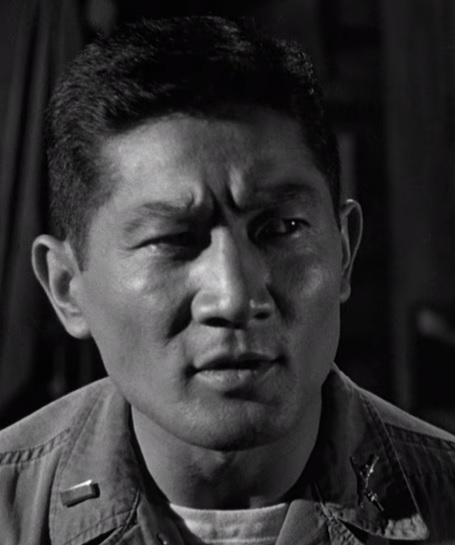
- George Shibata in Pork Chop Hill Movie c. 1959
- Born: 14 November 1926; Garland, Utah, U.S.
- Died: 20 May 1987 (aged 60); Huntington Beach, California, U.S.
- Burial place: West Point Cemetery
- Military career
- Allegiance: United States
- Branch: United States Army; United States Air Force; California Air National Guard
- Service years: 1945–1946 (U.S. Army); 1951–1955 (U.S. Air Force); 1955–1956 (Air National Guard)
- Rank: First lieutenant (U.S. Air Force)
- Units: 82nd Airborne Division (U.S. Army); 508th Parachute Infantry Regiment (U.S. Army); 58th Fighter Bomber Wing (U.S. Air Force)
- Conflicts: Korean War
- Other work: Lawyer; actor

George Shibata (Japanese: 柴田 穣次, November 14, 1926 – May 20, 1987) was an American military officer, attorney, and film & television actor. He was the first Japanese American graduate of any of the United States Service Academies, graduating from the United States Military Academy at West Point in 1951. He served in the U.S. Army from 1945 to 1946, and in the U.S. Air Force as a commissioned officer from 1951 to 1955, as a fighter pilot.

After leaving Regular Air Force service, Shibata embarked on a civilian career as an attorney, and later as a motion picture and television actor. He was perhaps best known for his portrayal of Lt. Suki Ohashi in the 1959 film Pork Chop Hill, which starred Gregory Peck as Joseph G. Clemons, his real-life former West Point classmate.

== Early life and military service ==
Shibata was born in 1926, the youngest of nine children, to immigrant Issei parents in Garland, Utah, where a Japanese farming community had established itself at the turn of the 20th century. By his own admission an indifferent student, Shibata diverted his childhood attention to sports (football, basketball and track) and riding horses (including rodeo) in the farming communities around Garland.

Despite such distractions, he demonstrated an aptitude for mathematics and science, graduating in 1944 with solid grades from Bear River High School in Tremonton, Utah. Shibata then enrolled in the Army Specialized Training Program (ASTP) (also known as A-12) officer training program at the University of Idaho and Amherst College. He soon grew restless, however, and in January 1945, he enlisted for active duty as a U.S Army paratrooper.

After jump training, he deployed to Europe in August 1945. He served post-war occupation duties in Germany for 18 months with the 82nd Airborne Division and 508th Parachute Infantry Regiment.

== West Point ==
Returning to Garland, Shibata sought an appointment to the United States Military Academy at West Point. While previously on active duty, he had passed an admissions examination for enlisted soldiers, but was placed on a long waiting list. In 1946, Shibata garnered a nomination from Senator Elbert Thomas. Enrolling the following year, Shibata found himself together with other Plebes (freshmen) who also had prior military service, many of whom had seen combat in World War II.

Despite the homogeneous racial makeup of the Corps of Cadets at that time, Shibata became friends with many of his classmates, gaining a colorful reputation as a cadet who was "always ready for a good time." He even served as best man at the wedding of a roommate who was the scion of a prominent family in the deep South.

Shibata partially credited his popularity to trying out for the West Point sports (track and football) teams during his Plebe year, although injuries sidelined him during his sophomore year.

Shibata graduated in 1951 with a Bachelor of Science in Civil Engineering, becoming the first Japanese American graduate of any U.S. service academy. The young Nisei's graduation was considered to be a major milestone in breaking through racial barriers. Reader's Digest even wrote an article profiling Shibata's accomplishments at the academy. Class of 1951 alumni included Edwin “Buzz” Aldrin, David Manker Abshire, Frank Fischl, Robert Isaac, Edward C. Meyer, and Joseph (Joe) Clemons. Shibata commissioned into the Air Force as a 2nd Lieutenant, the Air Force Academy not having yet opened.

== U.S. Air Force ==
After commissioning, Shibata declined assignment to night-fighter aircraft, believing that he would not complete the lengthy specialized training before the Korean War reached an armistice. Ultimately assigned to an F-86 (Saber) squadron with the 58th Fighter Bomber Wing, he flew 30 combat missions out of Taegu Air Force Base, Republic of Korea. He was primarily assigned to ground-attack missions and eventually served as deputy commander of the squadron. Shibata later commented that his actual combat experience turned out to be no more fearsome than the intensive flying and combat-crew training he underwent leading up to the war.

Shibata's overseas service led to some droll experiences, such as eliciting racial confusion from Taiwanese officials when he ferried jets to Taiwan (then commonly referred to as Formosa), and searching in vain for distant relatives in Japan with his limited Japanese language skills.

After the war, Shibata served various peacetime assignments, primarily in the southern part of the United States.

== Return to civilian life ==
While serving as a general's aide, Shibata began taking classes at Emory University Law School. In 1955, he decided to separate from military service (transferring briefly to the Air National Guard) to pursue a career in law. He later mentioned in an interview that he and his older brother, who was already a lawyer, were probably influenced by their late father.

Shibata matriculated to the University of Southern California (USC) law school that fall. Some of his family had by then moved to the Los Angeles area, and he had Japanese American friends in the area, some of whom he had met when they evacuated to Utah during World War II due to the racial mass hysteria against Japanese Americans in California.

== Film and television actor ==
In 1958, a chance encounter with a West Point classmate catapulted Shibata into the world of movie acting. While waiting out a rainstorm in Hollywood, he dashed into an eatery and bumped into his former West Point classmate, Captain Joseph G. Clemons, who was still serving in the Regular Army and currently assigned as the Army's technical advisor to a United Artists production titled Pork Chop Hill.

The movie was based on a book by Army historian Brigadier General S.L.A. Marshall, Pork Chop Hill: The American Fighting Man in Action, an account of the savage ferocity of the Battle of Pork Chop Hill, a series of engagements fought toward the end of the Korean War. Some 77,000 artillery rounds, not counting small caliber gunfire, were fired during the first engagement.

Clemons, who would be depicted on film by lead actor Gregory Peck, was a 1st Lieutenant the commanding officer of K (King) Company, 31st Infantry Regiment 7th Infantry Division, and during the first part of the battle, lost 97 out of 135 men in his company. (Years later, Clemons would command the 198th infantry brigade in Vietnam and mentor, among others, a young Norman Schwarzkopf. At first, Clemons mistook Shibata for Lieutenant Tsugio ("Eddie" or "Tsuki") Ohashi, his old Company K executive officer who was also Japanese American, and mentioned the production's search for the right actor to play the role. After clearing up the mistake, Clemons suggested that Shibata audition for the role. Shibata demurred, as he did not initially take Clemons’ suggestion seriously. However, he later contacted producer Sy Bartlett, who ultimately decided to cast Shibata despite his total lack of acting experience. Bartlett was later quoted as intentionally seeking unknowns, journeymen, and stage actors (with the notable exceptions of Gregory Peck and sports great Woody Strode), testing over 600 actors to fill the film's 83 speaking roles. Many of the cast would garner further fame later in their careers, including Harry Guardino, George Peppard, Rip Torn, Norman Fell, Robert Blake, Gavin McLeod, Martin Landau, Harry Dean Stanton, and Clarence Williams III. In an interview, Peck said, "This bit of casting was unorthodox even for Hollywood. We were having great difficulty getting the right person for the part. It called for someone with a certain youthful toughness and a military aura….Happily for us [technical advisor Capt Joe Clemons] discovered his former West Point classmate was attending USC." During the production, Clemons decided to play a joke on his Air Force pilot classmate, whose accommodations during the Korean War were more comfortable than Clemons', by ensuring that Shibata wore the only actual flak jacket in the film, the other cast members wearing foam rubber reproductions.

The film Pork Chop Hill proved a critical and commercial success, ending up as the 14th top grossing film of the year. Despite Shibata's lack of acting experience, the New York Times praised his performance, stating that “George Shibata (who happens to be a West Point graduate) is excellent as the company's Nisei executive officer.” The movie experience prompted him to continue to pursue acting, although upon Gregory Peck's advice, Shibata completed his law studies and sat for the Bar examination. Shibata would continue taking roles as they presented themselves, later appearing in major Hollywood movies such as 1960's Hell to Eternity (as Kaz Une), starring Jeffrey Hunter and David Janssen; 1960's The Wackiest Ship in the Army (as Captain Shigetsu), starring Jack Lemmon and Ricky Nelson; 1963's The Ugly American (as Munsang), starring Marlon Brando; and 1966's Around the World Under the Sea (as Professor Uji Hamaru), starring Lloyd Bridges.

Shibata did not accept all of the roles offered to him, however, most notably rejecting a role on The F.B.I. television series starring Efrem Zimbalist. The role, in an episode with the working title, “Will the Real Traitor Please Stand Up?”, depicted the character of a Nisei who joined the Imperial Japanese Army in World War II and tortured U.S. prisoners of war. (The episode was re-named “The Hiding Place” and aired in 1966 on season 1 of the series.) Shibata was requested by Warner Brothers to take the role without reading the script, but he insisted upon reading the script first. He then declined the role, because "the character twisted the real life person upon whom it was based. In reality, the Nisei was a 19-year-old attending school in Japan when World War II broke out. Trapped in Japan, he took a translator job in a prisoner of war camp but never committed any violence against prisoners...But in the TV script, he's represented as a brute who is responsible for the maiming and blinding of American prisoners." Director Don Medford defended the script, contending the Japanese American community was loyal to the United States and, therefore, would find a traitor in their midst to be intolerable. However, Shibata noted, "Many people don't remember the actual case, and the younger generation doesn't understand the background of the actual story. It's bound to have an adverse effect on the public."

== Professional career and later life ==
Shibata graduated in 1958 from the USC School of Law. After completing work in his early movie appearances, he passed the California bar exam in 1959 and was admitted to the State Bar in January 1960. In late 1960, he joined the District Attorney's Office in Orange County, California. By 1963, he joined the City Attorney's office of Huntington Beach, California. In 1964, he married and decided to stay in Huntington Beach as a community to raise his daughter and son. During his time as an Assistant City Attorney, Shibata was noted by the local press for aggressively taking on a big oil firm and housing industry attorneys on behalf of the public. By 1966, Shibata had moved into private practice, but continued to act on the side in film and television projects. In 1967, he accepted his final acting role for a television pilot, The Hardy Boys: The Mystery of the Chinese Junk, (as Ben Foy) starring Tim Matheson and Richard Gates. Shibata expressed an interest in politics, and served on the Orange County Human Relations Committee, although he never seriously pursued elected office.

Shibata continued in the legal field until his death in 1987. He was interred at the cemetery of his alma mater, the U.S. Military Academy at West Point, late that year.

== Filmography ==
=== Film ===
Year	Title	Role	Director	Notes
1959	Pork Chop Hill	Lt. Tsugio Ohashi	Lewis Milestone	
1960	Hell to Eternity	Kaz Une	Phil Karlson	
1960	The Wackiest Ship in the Army	Captain Shigetsu	Richard Murphy	
1963	The Ugly American	Munsang	George Englund	
1966	Around the World Under the Sea	Professor Uji Hamaru	Andrew Marton	

=== Television ===
Year	Title	Role	Notes
1964	Ben Casey	Dr. Max Baker	Episode: "One Nation Indivisible"
1964	The Lieutenant	Militia Major	Episode: "To Kill a Man"
1967	The Hardy Boys: The Mystery of the Chinese Junk	Ben Foy	Television film
