= John D. Russell (politician) =

American politician (born 1946)

Member of the Georgia House of Representatives
- In office January 8, 1973 – January 12, 1987
- Preceded by: Alexander B. Russell
- Succeeded by: John O. Mobley Jr.
- Constituency: 62nd district (1973–1975); 64th district (1975–1987)

Personal details
- Born: John Davidson Russell; May 13, 1946 (age 80) DeKalb County, Georgia, U.S.
- Party: Democratic
- Spouse: Teresa Gail Wilson
- Parent: Alexander B. Russell (father)
- Relatives: Russell family
- Education: University of Georgia

John Davidson Russell (born May 13, 1946) is an American politician. He served as a Democratic member of the Georgia House of Representatives.

== Life and career ==
Russell was born in DeKalb County, Georgia, the son of Alexander Brevard Russell, a physician who would later serve in the Georgia House of Representatives. His paternal grandfather was Richard Russell Sr., and his uncles included Richard Russell Jr. and Robert Lee Russell. Russell attended the University of Georgia and served in the United States Marine Corps.

Russell served in the Georgia House of Representatives from 1973 to 1986.
