= Judge Russell =

Judge Russell may refer to:

- Dan Monroe Russell Jr. (1913–2011), judge of the United States District Court for the Southern District of Mississippi
- George L. Russell III (born 1965), judge of the United States District Court for the District of Maryland
- David Lynn Russell (born 1942), judge of the United States District Courts for the Eastern, Northern, and Western Districts of Oklahoma
- Donald S. Russell (1906–1998), judge of the United States Court of Appeals for the Fourth Circuit
- Gordon J. Russell (1859–1919), judge of the United States District Court for the Eastern District of Texas
- John D. Russell (judge) (born 1963), judge of the United States District Court for the Northern District of Oklahoma
- Robert Lee Russell (1900–1955), judge of the United States Court of Appeals for the Fifth Circuit
- Robert L. Russell Jr. (1925–1965), judge of the Georgia Court of Appeals
- Thomas B. Russell (born 1945), judge of the United States District Court for the Western District of Kentucky

== See also ==
- Justice Russell (disambiguation)
