= Alexander B. Russell =

American politician (1910–1995)

Member of the Georgia House of Representatives from the 14th district
- In office January 11, 1971 – January 8, 1973
- Preceded by: James W. Paris
- Succeeded by: John D. Russell

Personal details
- Born: Alexander Brevard Russell; October 19, 1910 Russell, Georgia, U.S.
- Died: February 10, 1995 (aged 84)
- Party: Democratic
- Spouses: Sarah Isabel Eaton (m. 1936, divorced); Sarah Kate Haymon Roberts (m. 1958)
- Children: 7, including John
- Parents: Richard Russell Sr.; Ina Dillard Russell
- Relatives: Russell family
- Education: University of Georgia (AB); Emory University (MD)
- Occupation: Physician; politician

Alexander Brevard Russell (October 19, 1910 – February 10, 1995) was an American politician. He served as a Democratic member of the Georgia House of Representatives.

== Life and career ==
=== Early life and education ===
Russell was born in Russell, Georgia on October 19, 1910, to Richard Russell Sr., the patriarch of the Russell political family, and Ina Dillard Russell. Among his elder siblings was Richard Russell Jr. and Robert Lee Russell. His father was a prominent lawyer and former state legislator, who, at that time, was serving on the Georgia Court of Appeals.

Russell attended Winder High School, the University of Georgia, and Emory University's School of Medicine.

=== Marriages and children ===
Russell was married twice: first, on September 28, 1936, to Sarah Isabel Eaton and, second, on April 15, 1958, to Sarah Kate Roberts (née Haymon). He had 7 children with his first wife, including John Davidson Russell.

=== Political career and death ===
Russell served in the Georgia House of Representatives from 1971 to 1972. He was succeeded by his son, John.

Russell died on February 10, 1995, at the age of 84.
