= Hugh Peterson =

American politician (1898–1961)

Member of the U.S. House of Representatives from Georgia's 1st district
- In office January 3, 1935 – January 3, 1947
- Preceded by: Homer Cling Parker
- Succeeded by: Prince Hulon Preston Jr.

Member of the Georgia State Senate from the 15th district
- In office January 12, 1931 – January 14, 1933
- Preceded by: George W. Lankford
- Succeeded by: Robert E. Rivers

Member of the Georgia House of Representatives from Montgomery County
- In office January 8, 1923 – January 12, 1931
- Preceded by: H. B. Folsom
- Succeeded by: A. S. Johnson

Personal details
- Born: August 21, 1898 near Ailey, Georgia, U.S.
- Died: October 3, 1961 (aged 63) Sylva, North Carolina, U.S.
- Party: Democratic
- Spouse: Patience Elizabeth Russell (m. 1930)
- Relatives: Russell family (by marriage)
- Education: Brewton–Parker Institute; University of Georgia

Hugh Peterson (August 21, 1898 – October 3, 1961) was a U.S. political figure and lawyer from the state of Georgia.

== Life ==
Peterson was born near Ailey, Georgia in 1898 and attended the Brewton–Parker Institute in Mount Vernon, Georgia and the University of Georgia in Athens. He studied law, gained admission to the state bar in 1921 and began the practice of law in Mount Vernon. In 1922, Peterson served as the Mayor.

From 1923 through 1931, Peterson served in the Georgia House of Representatives. In 1931, he became a state Senator and served in that position until 1932. In 1934, Peterson was elected to the 74th United States Congress as a Democratic member of the United States House of Representatives representing Georgia's 1st congressional district. He served five additional terms in that seat until losing his re-election campaign in 1946.

After his congressional service, Peterson returned to Ailey to practice law. He died on October 3, 1961, in Sylva, North Carolina and was buried in the Peterson family plot in Ailey.

Peterson was married to Patience Elizabeth Russell, daughter of Richard Russell Sr. and sister of Richard Russell Jr. and Robert Lee Russell.

== Bibliography ==
- United States Congress. "Hugh Peterson (id: P000260)". Biographical Directory of the United States Congress.

U.S. House of Representatives
Preceded by Homer Cling Parker	Member of the U.S. House of Representatives from Georgia's 1st congressional district January 3, 1935 – January 3, 1947	Succeeded by Prince Hulon Preston Jr.
