= Russell family =

Russell family may refer to:

- Clan Russell of Scotland, with connections to the Dukes of Bedford
  - Russell family, an English aristocratic family headed by the Duke of Bedford
  - Russell family, British aristocracy, who were created baronets
- Russell family (American political family), a Georgia family whose members have held prominent positions in the state government and U.S. government
- Russell family (Passions), a fictional family on Passions

== See also ==
- Russell (surname)
