= Walter B. Russell Jr. =

American politician (1929–2016)

Walt Russell
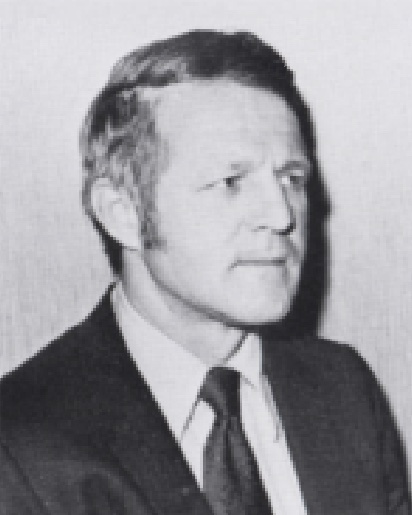
- Official portrait, c. 1973

Chair of the DeKalb County Board of Commissioners
- In office January 1, 1977 – January 1, 1981
- Preceded by: Bob Guhl
- Succeeded by: Manuel Maloof

Member of the Georgia House of Representatives
- In office January 11, 1971 – January 1, 1977
- Preceded by: J. Robin Harris
- Succeeded by: Michael H. Lenderman
- Constituency: 77th district (1971–1973); 53rd district (1973–1977)

Personal details
- Born: Walter Brown Russell Jr. July 24, 1929 Greensboro, North Carolina, US
- Died: May 17, 2016 (aged 86)
- Resting place: Russell Family Cemetery, Winder, Georgia
- Party: Democratic
- Spouse: Nancy Hinton (m. 1954)
- Children: 5
- Education: U.S. Military Academy (BS); Emory University (JD)
- Occupation: Lawyer; soldier; politician
- Family: Russell family

Military service
- Allegiance: United States
- Branch/service: United States Army
- Years of service: 1951–1966
- Rank: Lieutenant colonel
- Commands: G Company, 17th Infantry Regiment
- Battles/wars: Korean War; Battle of Pork Chop Hill; Vietnam War
- Awards: Silver Star; Legion of Merit; Distinguished Flying Cross; Bronze Star Medal; Purple Heart (2)

Walter Brown Russell Jr. (July 24, 1929 – May 17, 2016) was an American soldier, state legislator, county commissioner, and lawyer. He served in Korea and Vietnam. After being retired from the U.S. Army because of a wound to his head, Russell graduated from law school, was elected to the Georgia House of Representatives and later to the chair of the Dekalb County commissioners. He practiced law after leaving public office.

== Early life ==
Russell was born in Greensboro, North Carolina, on July 24, 1929, to Walter B. and Dorothea Elberta (Bealer) Russell. In 1930 Russell was living in Mecklenburg, North Carolina. Russell attended high school in Durham, North Carolina, and attended Duke University from 1946 to 1947, before enrolling in United States Military Academy, West Point, New York, where he graduated as a member of the class of 1951; his Cullum number is 18198.

Russell at West Point, 1951

== Military career ==
During the Korean War Russell, then a first lieutenant, commanded G Company, 17th Infantry Regiment in the 7th Infantry Division. He was assigned to reinforce the counterattack against Pork Chop Hill being waged by K Company, commanded by his brother-in-law Joseph G. Clemons, and L Company, both of the 31st Infantry Regiment. The U.S. attack was successful and the units held their positions, preventing a Chinese Communist breakthrough in the 7th Infantry Division section of the line. Russell was awarded the Silver Star "for conspicuous gallantry and intrepidity" for his actions during the battle.

After the war, he served a number of roles. In 1956, he commanded an infantry company in the 82nd Airborne Division. In 1959 he was an Aviation Company Commander in the 82nd Airborne Division. In 1962 Russell graduated from the United States Army Command and General Staff College. In 1963 he was an Aviation Battalion Commander in the 11th Air Assault Division. In 1965 Russell graduated from the Armed Forces Staff College.

On October 10, 1965, Russell, then serving as operations officer of the 1st Cavalry Division was wounded in the head while flying a helicopter in the Republic of Vietnam; his wound was considered to be serious but he was expected to recover. In November 1965, Russell was awarded the Legion of Merit for his "exceptionally meritorious conduct" in Vietnam while he was hospitalized at Walter Reed General Hospital; Senator Richard B. Russell of Georgia presented the medal. He was retired wounded as a lieutenant colonel in 1966.

He was highly decorated for his service. His awards included Legion of Merit, Silver & Bronze Stars, Distinguished Flying Cross, two Purple Hearts, Air & Commendation Medals, Korean & Vietnam Campaign Ribbons, Master Parachutist and Combat Infantry Badges, Senior Army Aviation Wings, and Ranger Tab.

== Civilian career ==
After retiring from the U.S. Army, Russell graduated from the Emory University School of Law with an J.D. degree and became a member of the Georgia Bar in 1970. That same year, he was elected to the Georgia House of Representatives where he served three terms. In 1971-1972 he was a representative of District 77 serving post 1. In 1973-1974 and 1975-1976 he was serving District 53, in all three terms representing DeKalb County, Georgia. During his service in the House, he opposed a resolution in favor of leniency for Lieutenant William Calley. In 1970, Russell joined with fellow state legislator, Max Cleland, to condemn using raids into North Vietnam to rescue prisoners of war, advocating for negotiated solutions. In 1971, he led an effort by the Georgia House to pass a resolution calling for an end to the war. He was later elected chairman of the DeKalb County, Georgia, board of commissioners.

== Personal life ==
He married Nancy Hinton on October 30, 1954, in Boone County, Missouri. Nancy was born October 25, 1930, in Fort Sheridan, Illinois. She was the daughter of Col. John Hinton (b. 1895) and Betty Peabody (Fitts) Hinton (b. 1905). They had five children: Walter B. Russell III (b. 1955), Emily Russell (b. 1957), Betty Hinton Russell (b. 1959), Stuart Brevard Russell (b. 1962), and Anne Minetree Russell Eiswirth (b. 1967). Russell was the son of Walter Brown Russell (1903–1986) and Dorothea Elberta (Bealer) Russell (1906–1981). He was the grandson of Richard Russell Sr. (1861–1938), who was a chief justice of the Georgia Supreme Court.

He was an Episcopalian and was a member of Sigma Alpha Epsilon and Phi Delta Phi.

== Later life and death ==
After leaving public office, Russell continued to practice law then later retired. He died on May 17, 2016.

== In media ==
Russell was portrayed by actor Rip Torn in the 1959 film Pork Chop Hill about the battle in Korea.
