= Justice Russell =

Justice Russell may refer to:

- Chambers Russell (1713–1766), associate justice of the Massachusetts Supreme Judicial Court
- Charles Russell, Baron Russell of Killowen (1832–1900), Lord Chief Justice of England
- Charles Ritchie Russell, Baron Russell of Killowen (1908–1986), British judge and law lord
- Charles S. Russell (1926–2026), associate justice of the Supreme Court of Virginia
- James Russell (Hong Kong judge) (1842–1893), acting chief justice of the Supreme Court of Hong Kong
- Joseph Russell (judge) (1702–1780), associate justice and chief justice of the Rhode Island Supreme Court
- Mary Rhodes Russell (born 1958), associate justice of the Supreme Court of Missouri
- Richard Russell Sr. (1861–1938), chief justice of the Supreme Court of Georgia
- Wesley G. Russell Jr. (born 1970), associate justice of the Supreme Court of Virginia

== See also ==
- Judge Russell (disambiguation)
