= Pork Chop Hill (film) =

1959 film by Lewis Milestone

- Theatrical release poster
- Directed by: Lewis Milestone
- Screenplay by: James R. Webb
- Based on: Pork Chop Hill: The American Fighting Man in Action; 1956 novel by S. L. A. Marshall
- Produced by: Sy Bartlett
- Starring: Gregory Peck; Harry Guardino; Rip Torn; George Peppard; James Edwards; Bob Steele; Woody Strode; George Shibata
- Cinematography: Sam Leavitt
- Edited by: George Boemler
- Music by: Leonard Rosenman
- Production company: Melville Productions
- Distributed by: United Artists
- Release date: May 29, 1959 (USA)
- Running time: 97 minutes
- Country: United States
- Language: English
- Budget: $ 3 million or $1,750,000
- Box office: $2.1 million (est. domestic)

For the Korean War battles, see Battle of Pork Chop Hill.

Pork Chop Hill is a 1959 American Korean War film starring Gregory Peck, Woody Strode, Rip Torn, and George Peppard. The film, which was the final war film directed by Lewis Milestone, is based upon the 1956 book by U.S. military historian Brigadier General S. L. A. Marshall. It depicts the first fierce Battle of Pork Chop Hill between the U.S. Army's 7th Infantry Division and Chinese and North Korean forces in April 1953.

The film features numerous actors who would go on to become movie and television stars in the 1960s and the 1970s such as Woody Strode, Harry Guardino, Robert Blake, George Peppard, Norman Fell, Abel Fernandez, Gavin MacLeod, Harry Dean Stanton, and Clarence Williams III. It is also the screen debut of Martin Landau and George Shibata, who was a West Point classmate of Lieutenant Joe Clemons, who also acted as technical adviser on the film.

== Plot ==
In April 1953, during the Korean War, K Company, 31st Infantry Regiment, 7th Infantry Division, under the command of Lieutenant Joe Clemons, is assigned to recapture Pork Chop Hill from a larger Chinese People's Volunteer Army force. Clemons leads 2nd Platoon, while putting his friend and Executive Officer, Lieutenant Tsugio Ohashi in charge of 1st Platoon, while 3rd Platoon is kept as a reserve. They succeed in taking the hill, trench by trench, but at the cost of high casualties. Clemons is promised another company as reinforcements, but L Company is ambushed, and only about a dozen infantrymen reach him. They prepare for a large-scale PVA counterattack, with only 25 men left out of the whole company.

Meanwhile, at nearby Panmunjeom, cease-fire negotiations continue, and U.S. Army High Command are unwilling to reinforce the hill because its value is not worth further losses. Yet they will not abandon the hill either, because it is a point of negotiation in the talks. Eventually, American negotiators come to the conclusion that the Chinese are pouring soldiers into the battle for a militarily insignificant hill to test the resolve of the Americans. Thus, the decision is made to reinforce the hill, saving the lives of the survivors of Clemons's unit.

== Cast ==
- Gregory Peck as Lieutenant Joe Clemons
- Rip Torn as Lieutenant Walter Russell
- George Shibata as Lieutenant Suki Ohashi (Based on Lieutenant Tsugi Ohashi)
- Woody Strode as Private Franklin
- Harry Guardino as Private First Class Forstman
- George Peppard as Corporal Chuck Fedderson
- Norman Fell as Staff Sergeant Coleman
- Cliff Ketchum as Corporal Payne
- Robert Blake as Private Velie
- Viraj Amonsin as Chinese Broadcaster
- Bob Steele as Colonel Kern (Based on Colonel William B. Kern)
- Carl Benton Reid as American Admiral
- Charles Aidman as Lieutenant Harold (Based on Lieutenant Thomas U. Harrold)
- Barry Atwater as Lieutenant Colonel Davis
- Leonard Graves as Lieutenant Cook (Based on Lieutenant Robert S. Cook)
- Martin Landau as Lieutenant Marshall (Based on Lieutenant Arthur A. Marshall)
- Ken Lynch as Major General Trudeau
- Lew Gallo as Lieutenant of Division Public Relations (Based on Lieutenant James Barrows)
- James Edwards as Corporal Jurgens
- Biff Elliot as Private Boven
- Syl Lamont as Sergeant Kuzmick (Based on Sergeant First Class Walter Kuzmick)
- Paul Comi as Sergeant Kreucheberg
- Abel Fernandez as Kindley
- Chuck Hayward as Chalmers
- Kevin Hagen as Corporal Kissell
- Gavin MacLeod as Private Saxon
- John Alderman as Lieutenant Waldorf
- Bert Remsen as Lieutenant Cummings
- Robert Williams as Soldier Runner
- Buzz Martin as "Whitey"
- William Wellman Jr. as "Iron Man"
- John McKee as Corporal Olds
- Michael Garth as S-2 Officer Lieutenant James Blake
- Harry Dean Stanton as BAR Man (uncredited)
- Clarence Williams III as Message Runner (uncredited)
- DeForest Covan as U.S. Soldier (uncredited)

== Production ==
The film was based on Marshall's book Pork Chop Hill published in 1956. The New York Times called it "unforgettable".

In August 1957 the film rights were bought by Melville Productions, the film company of Gregory Peck. Sy Bartlett was to produce and James Webb was to write the script. It was Webb who recommended the project to Melville. He decided to focus the action on Company K, who took up a chapter in the book, "All the King's Men", over a 24-hour period.

S.L.A. Marshall reportedly disliked the fact that he had sold the movie rights to his book for next-to-nothing, and vowed not to make the same mistake again.

In January 1958 Lewis Milestone agreed to direct. He and Bartlett wanted to cast unknowns in support of Peck and saw over 600 actors for 83 speaking parts.

Strode and Edwards' portrayal of African American soldiers is based on the 24th Infantry Regiment, which was still racially segregated in Korea. All Black units were integrated in the summer and fall of 1951 and all Black units were integrated and closed out on 1 October 1951. Like its cinematic portrayal, the real regiment was poorly trained, poorly equipped and poorly led. More than once when this all-black unit was placed on the front lines, a unit in reserve was positioned directly behind because they were expected to break. The regiment was finally considered so unreliable it was disbanded. Its personnel were reassigned to other combat units just as in the film, which portrays Edwards' character - with good leadership - becoming an effective soldier.

=== Casting choices ===
George Shibata, who stars as Lt. Suki Ohashi, became the first Nisei appointed to West Point through the sponsorship of Sen. Elbert D. Thomas. Shibata was the first Asian American graduate of the United States Military Academy, Class of 1951 and commissioned into the United States Air Force later in that same year (1951). During the Korean War he flew an F-86 Sabre out of Taegu Air Force Base. The film Pork Chop Hill was about Shibata's classmate Joseph G. Clemons, who was also a 1951 West Point graduate. This came about when Clemons accidentally bumped into his old friend Shibata at a drugstore when Clemons was in California acting as a technical adviser for the forthcoming film. He convinced Shibata to try out for the role of the Japanese-Hawaiian Executive Officer, Lt. Tsugio Ohashi when Hollywood was having a problem casting the role. During the production Clemons decided to play a joke on his Air Force pilot classmate whose accommodations during the war were more comfortable than Clemons' by ensuring that Shibata wore the only actual flak jacket in the film; the other cast members wearing foam rubber reproductions.

The film was the second feature film for George Peppard.

=== Filming ===
Filming started 19 May 1958. Some of the location shooting was conducted in California near Westlake Village and in San Fernando Valley. Two months before filming the unit moved into an Albertson Company Ranch where the bulk of the film was to be shot and created a series of trenches.

Peck, although not credited, directed a few scenes despite protests by Milestone.

Milestone called it his "most interesting job in a long time."

The film had an allocated shooting schedule of 40 days and ended up needing another 15 days.

=== Clash between Peck and Milestone ===
Peck and director Milestone clashed during filming over Peck's performance; the director wanted Peck to play his character as more insecure while Peck wanted a more conventional approach. Before the film's premier in May 1959, United Artists cut the film by nearly 20 minutes. Milestone claimed changes were made because Veronique Peck, the wife of star Gregory Peck, felt her husband made his first entrance too late into the picture. While that claim stands as unconfirmed, the film does show signs of post-production editing, with segments of several excised scenes showing up under the main title credits.

Milestone's version reportedly featured more cross cutting between the fighting and the peace conference and made Peck's character less of a conventional hero. The director says it also featured more scenes involving the Chinese.

== Release ==
The film opened in Chicago and Detroit in the week ended May 26, 1959. It opened at the Roxy Theatre in New York City on May 29 and became number one in the U.S.

The film was a minor box office hit.

=== Critical response ===
The New York Times applauded the film's "grim and rugged" style, the way it captured the "resentment" of the American GIs, and how it "tacitly points the obsoleteness of ground warfare".

== See also ==
- List of American films of 1959

== Notes ==
- Fishgall, Gary (2002). Gregory Peck. Scribner. ISBN 9780684852904.
