= Funk, Nebraska =

- Village
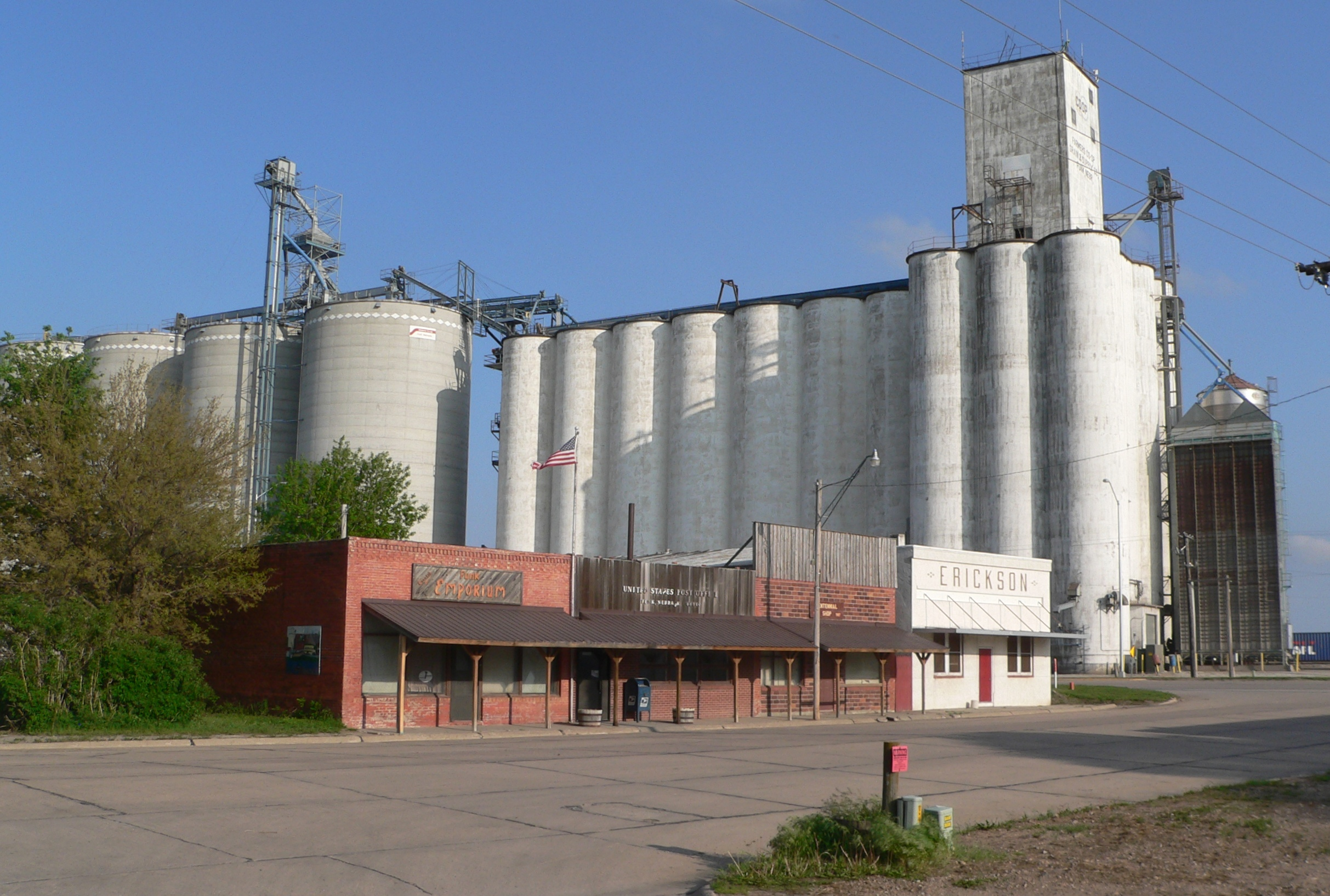
- Downtown Funk, with grain elevators in background.

- Location of Funk, Nebraska
- Coordinates: 40°27′47″N 99°15′03″W
- Country: United States
- State: Nebraska
- County: Phelps

Government
  - Mayor: Byron Kraynor

Area
  - Total: 0.26 sq mi (0.68 km^{2})
  - Land: 0.26 sq mi (0.68 km^{2})
  - Water: 0 sq mi (0.00 km^{2})
- Elevation: 2,244 ft (684 m)

Population (2020)
  - Total: 175
  - Density: 665.9/sq mi (257.09/km^{2})
- Time zone: UTC-6 (Central (CST))
  - Summer (DST): UTC-5 (CDT)
- ZIP code: 68940
- Area code: 308
- FIPS code: 31-17880
- GNIS feature ID: 2398933
- Website: funkne.com

Funk is a village in Phelps County, Nebraska, United States. As of the 2020 census, Funk had a population of 175.

== History ==
Funk was platted in 1887 on the railroad. It was named for Phillip C. Funk, an early settler. Funk was incorporated as a village in 1913.

== Geography ==
According to the United States Census Bureau, the village has a total area of 0.26 square miles (0.67 km^{2}), all land.

== Demographics ==
Historical population
Census	Pop.	Note	%±
1920	147		—
1930	117		−20.4%
1940	120		2.6%
1950	123		2.5%
1960	141		14.6%
1970	143		1.4%
1980	189		32.2%
1990	198		4.8%
2000	204		3.0%
2010	194		−4.9%
2020	175		−9.8%
U.S. Decennial Census

=== 2010 census ===
At the 2010 census there were 194 people, 79 households, and 54 families living in the village. The population density was 746.2 inhabitants per square mile (288.1/km^{2}). There were 85 housing units at an average density of 326.9 units per square mile (126.2 units/km^{2}). The racial makeup of the village was 95.9% White, 0.5% Native American, 0.5% from other races, and 3.1% from two or more races. Hispanic or Latino of any race were 1.5%.

Of the 79 households 29.1% had children under the age of 18 living with them, 59.5% were married couples living together, 7.6% had a female householder with no husband present, 1.3% had a male householder with no wife present, and 31.6% were non-families. 29.1% of households were one person and 15.2% were one person aged 65 or older. The average household size was 2.46 and the average family size was 3.02.

The median age in the village was 45.6 years. 26.3% of residents were under the age of 18; 5.2% were between the ages of 18 and 24; 17% were from 25 to 44; 33% were from 45 to 64; and 18.6% were 65 or older. The gender makeup of the village was 50.5% male and 49.5% female.

=== 2000 census ===
At the 2000 census there were 204 people, 77 households, and 65 families living in the village. The population density was 769.7 inhabitants per square mile (297.2/km^{2}). There were 82 housing units at an average density of 309.4 units per square mile (119.5 units/km^{2}). The racial makeup of the village was 98.04% White, 0.49% Asian, 0.98% from other races, and 0.49% from two or more races. Hispanic or Latino of any race were 1.47%.

Of the 77 households 37.7% had children under the age of 18 living with them, 74.0% were married couples living together, 10.4% had a female householder with no husband present, and 14.3% were non-families. 14.3% of households were one person and 7.8% were one person aged 65 or older. The average household size was 2.65 and the average family size was 2.92.

The age distribution was 29.9% under the age of 18, 3.9% from 18 to 24, 22.5% from 25 to 44, 25.0% from 45 to 64, and 18.6% 65 or older. The median age was 42 years. For every 100 females, there were 98.1 males. For every 100 females age 18 and over, there were 88.2 males.

The median household income was $36,250, and the median family income was $43,333. Males had a median income of $22,292 versus $20,833 for females. The per capita income for the village was $15,658. About 7.1% of families and 15.3% of the population were below the poverty line, including 32.7% of those under the age of eighteen and 4.3% of those sixty five or over.

== Notable people ==
- John Robert Brown, one of the “Fifth Circuit Four” pivotal in the 1960s black civil rights movement, was born in Funk.
