= Hell to Eternity =

1960 film by Phil Karlson

- Original film poster
- Directed by: Phil Karlson
- Screenplay by: Ted Sherdeman; Walter Roeber Schmidt
- Story by: Gil Doud
- Produced by: Irving H. Levin
- Starring: Jeffrey Hunter; David Janssen; Vic Damone
- Cinematography: Burnett Guffey
- Edited by: Roy V. Livingston; George White
- Music by: Leith Stevens
- Production company: Atlantic Pictures
- Distributed by: Allied Artists
- Release date: September 30, 1960
- Running time: 131 minutes
- Country: United States
- Language: English
- Budget: $800,000
- Box office: $2,800,000 (US/Canada)

Hell to Eternity is a 1960 American World War II film starring Jeffrey Hunter, David Janssen, Vic Damone and Patricia Owens, directed by Phil Karlson. This film biopic is about the experiences of Marine hero Pfc. Guy Gabaldon (played by Hunter), a Los Angeles Hispanic boy raised in the 1930s by a Japanese American foster family, and his heroic actions during the Battle of Saipan. Sessue Hayakawa played the role of Japanese commander at Saipan.

== Plot ==
In Depression-era Los Angeles, Guy Gabaldon gets into a fight at school when another boy snitches about his breaking into a grocery store. After Japanese-American Kaz Une (the brother of Guy's physical education teacher and friend George) learns that Guy's mother is in the hospital and his father is dead, he invites Guy to stay with his family. As Kaz's parents speak little English, Guy begins to learn Japanese. Then, when Guy's mother dies, the Une family adopts him. He becomes especially close to Kaz's mother.

After the attack on Pearl Harbor and the US entry into World War II, Gabaldon's foster family is sent to an internment camp – Camp Manzanar. Gabaldon is drafted, but fails his physical exam due to a perforated eardrum. When Gabaldon goes to visit the Une family, he learns that George and Kaz have been allowed to join the Army and are fighting in Italy with the 442nd Regimental Combat Team. After making sure that "mama-san" does not object, he manages to enlist in the Marines on the strength of his language skills.

Gabaldon does not make a good first impression on Platoon Sgt. Bill Hazen at Camp Pendleton, but wins him over. When they are shipped to Hawaii to join the Regimental Intelligence section of the 2nd Marines, 2nd Marine Division, he gets himself, Hazen and Cpl. Pete Lewis bottles of whiskey and dates with two Japanese-American women and standoffish reporter Sheila Lincoln. Sheila is disgusted by the behavior of the rowdy Marines, but eventually warms up to Gabaldon after a few drinks.

Going ashore on Saipan, he freezes at first when he comes under fire for the first time, but regains his composure. He uses his Japanese language skills to persuade Japanese soldiers to surrender. In fighting against a banzai charge, Lewis is killed, and later during the bloody campaign for the island, Sgt. Hazen is shot in the leg, becomes pinned down and subsequently killed by a Japanese swordsman. Gabaldon then becomes enraged, stops talking Japanese soldiers into surrendering and starts killing them ruthlessly. After he witnesses two civilians commit suicide rather than surrender, he remembers George and "mama-san" and reverts back to the way he was before. During the final battle, he convinces the Japanese general to order approximately 1000 Japanese soldiers, and 500 civilians to surrender.

== Cast ==
- Jeffrey Hunter as Guy Gabaldon
- David Janssen as S/Sgt. Bill Hazen
- Vic Damone as Cpl. Pete 'Junior' Lewis
- Patricia Owens as Sheila Lincoln
- Richard Eyer as Guy, as a boy
- John Larch as Capt. Schwabe
- Bill Williams as Leonard
- Michi Kobi as Sono
- George Shibata as Kaz Une
- Reiko Sato as Famika
- Richard Gardner as Polaski
- Bob Okazaki as Papa Une
- George Matsui as George, as a boy
- Nicky Blair as Martini
- George Takei as George (as George Takai)
- Miiko Taka as Ester
- Tsuru Aoki as Mother Une (as Tsuru Aoki Hayakawa)
- Sessue Hayakawa as Gen. Matsui
- Frank Gerstle as Drunken officer (uncredited)
- Paul Togawa as Freddy (uncredited)

== Production ==
Gramercy Pictures bought the screen rights of Gabaldon's story in June 1957. Previously, it had been featured on the TV show This Is Your Life.

The bulk of fiancing for the film – $650,000 – came from American Broadcasting-Paramount Theatres, a theatre chain. They noted the success of To Hell and Back (1955) with Audie Murphy, and sought out another true life World War Two story that might make a good film. They came across the story of Guy Gabaldon and decided to invest in it. Jeffrey Hunter had just been in the popular war film In Love and War.

Phil Karlson called it "one of the most important pictures that I may ever make because it was the true story of the Nisei, what happened in this country. But Allied Artists, even at that point, looked at it as a great war story that you could make for a price. They had no idea what I was doing."

The film was shot on location in Okinawa.

== Reception ==
Variety said "it appears that certain concessions were made for the sake of commercialism, reducing its overall artistic stature, but the end product is one that is bound to please and excite the average filmgoer, particularly the average male."

Steve Broidy, head of Allied Artists, called it "a very, very successful picture."

The film's commercial performance was helped by a series of personal appearances by Guy Gabaldon who expressed happiness with Jeffrey Hunter's portrayal of him although suggested that the role might have been better played by the Marine Veteran himself.

== Home media ==
The DVD of the film was released on June 5, 2007 in the United States.

== Novelization ==
A novelization of the screenplay was written by American writer Edward S. Aarons (1916–1975), published in a mass market, tie-in paperback edition (first printing cover price 25¢) under the Gold Medal Books imprint, with 1960 copyright assigned to Fawcett Publications. The book's presentation falls under the category of "implied novelization," as there is no attribution anywhere to the screenplay, the screenstory or their respective authors, and the front cover action illustration of two soldiers only suggests star Jeffrey Hunter in the foreground; however the back cover contains, along with brief descriptive info, a romantic still from the movie and a blurb about the film, naming the studio, the production company and the stars. Even these indicia were removed, however, with the release of a second printing, probably a year or two later. Save for the uptick in price (40¢), the front cover illustration is identical, but the back cover is white, displaying only the brief descriptive info and the symbol of the U.S. Marine Corps. Implications of the film as source material were no doubt obliterated from the book to make the most out of the by-line, as Aarons was one of Gold Medal's most popular (and prolific) authors, and would remain so until the end of his career. (Aarons is best known for his prolific "Assignment" espionage series, featuring agent Sam Durell.)

== See also ==
- List of American films of 1960

== Bibliography ==
- Niemi, Robert (January 1, 2006). History in the Media: Film and Television. ABC-CLIO. p. 100. ISBN 978-1-57607-952-2.
- Niemi, Robert James (October 17, 2013). Inspired by True Events: An Illustrated Guide to More Than 500 History-Based Films: An Illustrated Guide to More Than 500 History-Based Films, Second Edition. ABC-CLIO. p. 120. ISBN 978-1-61069-198-7.
- Dick, Bernard F. (January 13, 2015). The Star-Spangled Screen: The American World War II Film. University Press of Kentucky. p. 239. ISBN 978-0-8131-4895-3.
- Creef, Elena Tajima (January 1, 2004). Imaging Japanese America: The Visual Construction of Citizenship, Nation, and the Body. NYU Press. p. 95. ISBN 978-0-8147-1622-9.
- Rowan, Terry (2012). WOrld War II Goes to the Movies & Television Guide. Lulu.com. p. 210. ISBN 978-1-105-58602-6.
- Goldberg, Harold J. (May 2, 2007). D-Day in the Pacific: The Battle of Saipan. Indiana University Press. p. 197. ISBN 978-0-253-11681-9.
- Kluge, Paul Frederick (1991). The Edge of Paradise: America in Micronesia. University of Hawaii Press. p. 155. ISBN 978-0-8248-1567-7.
- Rosenberg, Emily S. (August 25, 2003). A Date Which Will Live: Pearl Harbor in American Memory. Duke University Press. p. 146. ISBN 0-8223-8745-X.
- Hamamoto, Darrell Y.; Liu, Sandra (2000). Countervisions: Asian American Film Criticism. Temple University Press. p. 163. ISBN 978-1-56639-776-6.
- Miyao, Daisuke (March 7, 2007). Sessue Hayakawa: Silent Cinema and Transnational Stardom. Duke University Press. p. 279. ISBN 978-0-8223-8982-8.
- Green, Paul (April 29, 2014). Jeffrey Hunter: The Film, Television, Radio and Stage Performances. McFarland. p. 89. ISBN 978-1-4766-1441-0.
- Sharp, Jasper (October 13, 2011). Historical Dictionary of Japanese Cinema. Scarecrow Press. p. 22. ISBN 978-0-8108-7541-8.
- Lott, M. Ray (January 1, 2004). The American Martial Arts Film. McFarland. p. 219. ISBN 978-0-7864-1836-7.
- Freese, Gene Scott (April 10, 2014). Hollywood Stunt Performers, 1910s-1970s: A Biographical Dictionary, 2d ed. McFarland. p. 1967. ISBN 978-1-4766-1470-0.
- Fujitani, T. (October 2, 2011). Race for Empire: Koreans as Japanese and Japanese as Americans during World War II. University of California Press. p. 380. ISBN 978-0-520-95036-8.
- New York Media, LLC (November 18, 1968). "New York Magazine". Newyorkmetro.com: 66. ISSN 0028-7369.
