= Elbert Tuttle =

American judge (1897–1996)

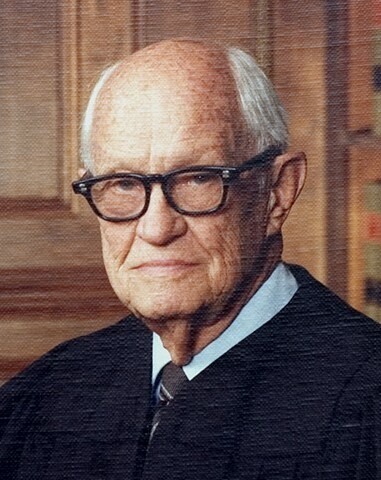

Senior Judge of the United States Court of Appeals for the Eleventh Circuit
- In office October 1, 1981 – June 23, 1996

Senior Judge of the United States Court of Appeals for the Fifth Circuit
- In office June 1, 1968 – October 1, 1981

Chief Judge of the United States Court of Appeals for the Fifth Circuit
- In office 1960–1967
- Preceded by: Richard Rives
- Succeeded by: John Robert Brown

Judge of the United States Court of Appeals for the Fifth Circuit
- In office August 4, 1954 – June 1, 1968
- Appointed by: Dwight D. Eisenhower
- Preceded by: Seat established by 68 Stat. 8
- Succeeded by: Lewis Render Morgan

Personal details
- Born: Elbert Parr Tuttle; July 17, 1897 Pasadena, California, U.S.
- Died: June 23, 1996 (aged 98) Atlanta, Georgia, U.S.
- Party: Republican
- Education: Cornell University (AB, LLB)

Military service
- Allegiance: United States of America
- Branch/service: U.S. Army
- Years of service: 1918–1919, 1941–1946
- Rank: Brigadier general
- Battles/wars: World War I World War II

Elbert Parr Tuttle (July 17, 1897 – June 23, 1996) was the chief judge of the United States Court of Appeals for the Fifth Circuit from 1960 to 1967, when that court became known for a series of decisions crucial in advancing the civil rights of African Americans during the civil rights movement. A Republican from Georgia, he was among the judges that became known as the "Fifth Circuit Four". At that time, the Fifth Circuit included not only Louisiana, Mississippi, and Texas (its jurisdiction as of 2025), but also Alabama, Georgia, Florida, and the Panama Canal Zone.

== Education and early career ==
Tuttle was born in Pasadena, California, on July 17, 1897. In 1906, his family moved to Hawaii where he attended Punahou School. In October 1910, he and his brother Malcolm built and flew the first glider in Hawaii.

Tuttle graduated from Cornell University in Ithaca, New York, in 1918 with a Bachelor of Arts degree. Tuttle was the editor-in-chief of The Cornell Daily Sun. He was also the founder of the Beta Theta chapter of Pi Kappa Alpha Fraternity at Cornell and was a member of the Sphinx Head Society. He then fought in World War I in the United States Army Air Service from 1918 to 1919.

Tuttle received a Bachelor of Laws from Cornell Law School, where he served as editor-in-chief of the Cornell Law Quarterly, in 1923. He was a reporter for the New York Evening World for several years while attending law school.

== Later career ==
After graduating from law school, he moved to Atlanta, Georgia, to practice law with the law firm of Sutherland, Tuttle & Brennan from 1923 to 1953 (the firm is now Eversheds Sutherland). Tuttle worked on tax litigation and also did pro bono work, including with the American Civil Liberties Union, and took on numerous civil rights cases.

Tuttle served as a colonel in the United States Army from 1941 to 1946, in World War II, declining a desk job. He was severely injured after engaging in hand-to-hand combat in Okinawa on the island of Ie Shima. He was awarded numerous medals for his service including the Purple Heart with Oak Leaf Cluster, the Legion of Merit, the Bronze Star, and the Bronze Service Arrowhead. Tuttle retired as a brigadier general and was often called "The General" by those who worked closely with him. After the War, Tuttle became more involved in politics, working with the Republican Party because of his opposition to segregation, which he associated mostly with southern Democrats. He was a general counsel for the United States Department of the Treasury from 1953 to 1954.

== Federal judicial service ==
Tuttle was nominated by President Dwight D. Eisenhower on July 7, 1954, to the United States Court of Appeals for the Fifth Circuit, to a new seat authorized by 68 Stat. 8. He was confirmed by the United States Senate on August 3, 1954, and received his commission the next day. He served as Chief Judge from 1960 to 1967 and was a member of the Judicial Conference of the United States from 1961 to 1967. He assumed senior status on June 1, 1968. He was reassigned by operation of law to the United States Court of Appeals for the Eleventh Circuit on October 1, 1981, pursuant to 94 Stat. 1994. His service terminated on June 23, 1996, due to his death in Atlanta.

=== Georgia gubernatorial election dispute ===
In the aftermath of the disputed 1966 Georgia gubernatorial election between Democrat Lester Maddox and Republican Bo Callaway, Tuttle joined Judge Griffin Bell, later the United States Attorney General, in striking down the Georgia constitutional provision requiring that the legislature chose the governor if no general election candidate receives a majority of the vote. The judges concluded that a malapportioned legislature might "dilute" the votes of the candidate with a plurality, in this case Callaway. Bell compared legislative selection to the former County Unit System, a kind of electoral college formerly used in Georgia to select the governor but invalidated by the U.S. Supreme Court. Bell and Tuttle granted a temporary suspension of their ruling to permit appeal to the U.S. Supreme Court and stipulated that the state could resolve the deadlock so long as the legislature not make the selection. In a five-to-four decision known as Fortson v. Morris, the high court struck down the Bell-Tuttle legal reasoning and directed the legislature to choose between Maddox and Callaway. The two leading liberal justices, William O. Douglas and Abe Fortas, had argued against legislative selection of the governor, but the court majority, led this time by Hugo Black took the strict constructionist line and cleared the path for Maddox's ultimate election.

== Honors ==
The Elbert P. Tuttle U.S. Court of Appeals Building was named in his honor in 1990. For his work in civil rights cases in the South, Tuttle received the Presidential Medal of Freedom in 1980. He has a star on Atlanta's International Civil Rights Walk of Fame.

== See also ==
- List of United States federal judges by longevity of service

== Bibliography ==
- Bass, Jack (May 3, 2004). "The 'Fifth Circuit Four'". The Nation. pp. 30–32.
- Emanuel, Anne (Fall 2011). Elbert Parr Tuttle: Chief Jurist of the Civil Rights Revolution. University of Georgia Press.
- Nina Totenberg (October 5, 2011). "Elbert Parr Tuttle, Quiet Civil Rights 'Revolutionary'" (Podcast). NPR.
- "Elbert Parr Tuttle". New Georgia Encyclopedia.
- "Eleventh Circuit profile". Archived from the original on April 5, 2007.
- "Story about the first glider flight in Hawaii". Archived from the original on February 20, 2006.
- Elbert P. Tuttle papers, 1917-1995 at the Stuart A. Rose Manuscript, Archives, and Rare Book Library, Emory University

Legal offices
Preceded by Seat established by 68 Stat. 8	Judge of the United States Court of Appeals for the Fifth Circuit; 1954–1968	Succeeded by Lewis Render Morgan
Preceded by Richard Rives	Chief Judge of the United States Court of Appeals for the Fifth Circuit; 1960–1967	Succeeded by John Robert Brown
