= Fifth Circuit Four =

Group of American judges

The "Fifth Circuit Four" (or simply "The Four") were four judges of the United States Court of Appeals for the Fifth Circuit who, during the late 1950s, became known for a series of decisions (which continued into the late 1960s) crucial in advancing the civil and political rights of African Americans. At that time, the Fifth Circuit included not only Louisiana, Mississippi, and Texas (the limits of its jurisdiction since October 1, 1981), but also Alabama, Georgia, Florida, and the Panama Canal Zone.

== Composition ==
"The Four" comprised Richard T. Rives, Elbert Parr Tuttle (who served as Chief Judge from 1960 to 1967), John R. Brown (who succeeded Tuttle as Chief Judge), and John Minor Wisdom. All but Rives were liberal Republicans; Rives was a Democrat and friend of Supreme Court justice Hugo Black. In their most famous cases, they were opposed by fellow Fifth Circuit judge Benjamin Franklin Cameron, an avowed states righter and former "Hoovercrat" who had been considered for a federal judgeship as early as 1930.

== Preceding history ==
During the first half of the twentieth century, appointments to lower federal courts were frequently dominated by local congressmen, especially senators. This meant that most members of the Southern bench were segregationists, and despite Hoover making two appointments to the court, all members as of 1943 were Democrats, with some like Robert Lee Russell being very close relatives of prominent opponents of civil rights. Although the Fourth Circuit had already ruled against Virginia's white primary in 1930, the Fifth in 1932 would uphold Texas' in a predecessor case to Nixon v. Condon, while in 1933 it upheld Louisiana's literacy test in Trudeau v. Barnes. Nevertheless, by 1946 Judge Samuel Hale Sibley was striking down that same white primary in Georgia.

Over the following decade the Fifth Circuit would be dominated by long-serving Judge Joseph Chappell Hutcheson Jr., a dyed-in-the-wool Texas Democrat originally appointed to the bench by Woodrow Wilson. Hutcheson was autocratic in style, fundamentally conservative and valued predictability, but not inherently opposed to civil rights for African Americans. Deaths and assumptions of senior status nonetheless meant the court underwent a continued transformation in the years surrounding Brown v. Board of Education. So early as 1951 only Hutcheson and Edwin R. Holmes remained on the Court from the Franklin Roosevelt administration, and four more judges would depart before the end of 1956.

== Formation of the "Four" ==
Alienation from Harry S. Truman's civil rights program caused many Black Belt Dixiecrats, notably anti-Long Louisiana Governor Robert F. Kennon to subsequently endorse the Republican Party nationally. The GOP's presidential quest became aided by reform of the moribund Republican parties in the area covered by the Fifth Circuit: a new generation of lawyers, many from the North or West, would redirect Louisiana and Georgia delegations from Robert Taft to Dwight D. Eisenhower at the 1952 GOP convention. Eisenhower was elected and the rapid postwar turnover created a major opportunity to rebuild the circuit. Unlike Democratic presidents, Eisenhower would make his appointments without influence from local senators, although Attorneys-General Herbert Brownell Jr. and William P. Rogers both were concerned at the liberalism of many Truman appointees to the bench.

When a new seat was created to cope with a burgeoning docket, Eisenhower rewarded Tuttle, then general counsel to the treasury, for his service in the 1952 election. Three seats became open in 1955: Eisenhower filled them with Cameron of Mississippi via the recommendation of Senator Eastland, Warren Leroy Jones of Florida and, after two years vacant, a recommendation from Cameron and much quarrelling with Eastland, Wisdom of Louisiana.

== Effects ==
The jurisprudence of the group led to expansion of the rights granted in Brown v. Board of Education to other areas of society, such as employment, integration, and voting rights. Since Brown did not specify the mechanisms for desegregation, it was crucial that lower federal courts such as the Fifth Circuit expanded civil rights law. In several cases, such as Louisiana v. United States, the court struck down "race neutral" laws that functionally denied African Americans their rights due to unequal application. In response, the judges faced major backlash from their communities, who were largely against integration and civil rights for African Americans. The judges received many phone threats and had their personal property destroyed or vandalized.

== Quote ==
"The Constitution is both color blind and color conscious. To avoid conflict with the equal protection clause, a classification that denies a benefit, causes harm, or imposes a burden must not be based on race. In that sense the Constitution is color blind. But the Constitution is color conscious to prevent discrimination being perpetuated and to undo the effects of past discrimination. The criterion is the relevancy of color to a legitimate government purpose." —Judge John Minor Wisdom, writing for the majority in United States v. Jefferson County Board of Education, 1966.

== See also ==
- Frank Minis Johnson – a U.S. District Judge for the Middle District of Alabama whose rulings had a strong impact on civil rights in the American South.
- J. Skelly Wright – Judge of the United States District Court for the Eastern District of Louisiana, and then of the United States Court of Appeals for the District of Columbia Circuit
