= Ina Dillard Russell =

American educator

- Born: Blandina Dillard; February 18, 1868; Oglethorpe, Georgia, U.S.
- Died: August 30, 1953 (aged 85)
- Spouse: Richard Russell Sr. (m. 1891; died 1938)
- Children: 15, including Richard Jr., Robert, and Alexander
- Relatives: Russell family

Blandina "Ina" Dillard Russell (February 18, 1868 – August 30, 1953) was an American teacher and homemaker who acted as the First Lady of the state of Georgia during the tenure of her son Richard Russell Jr.

In 1891, Russell married lawyer and future Georgia Supreme Court Justice Richard Russell Sr. After marriage, Russell spent time managing the family farm and raising 13 children. Her son Richard Russell Jr. became the Governor of Georgia and later a U.S. senator, and her son Robert Lee Russell became a U.S. Circuit Judge. Russell became known as "Mother Russell" by many Georgians, and flags across the state were flown at half-mast following her death.

== Early life ==
Ina Dillard Russell, was the thirteenth and final child of Frances Chaffin and Fielding Dillard. She was born on February 18, 1868, in Oglethorpe County, North Georgia. Russell lived through the transition to the New South while traditionally being brought up in the practice of Christianity.

She attended local schools in her younger years, enrolling at the Palmer Institute in Oxford, Ga and the Lucy Cobb Institute in Athens, Ga. While attending the Lucy Cobb Institute, she experienced living with five teachers in a living area called the "Cottage Content," near the University of Georgia. During this period, Russell began to build a relationship with Richard's younger brothers, who were attending UGA. After graduating in 1889, Russell began teaching third grade at Washington Street School in Athens, Georgia, while gaining experience in playing the piano.

== Marriage and family ==
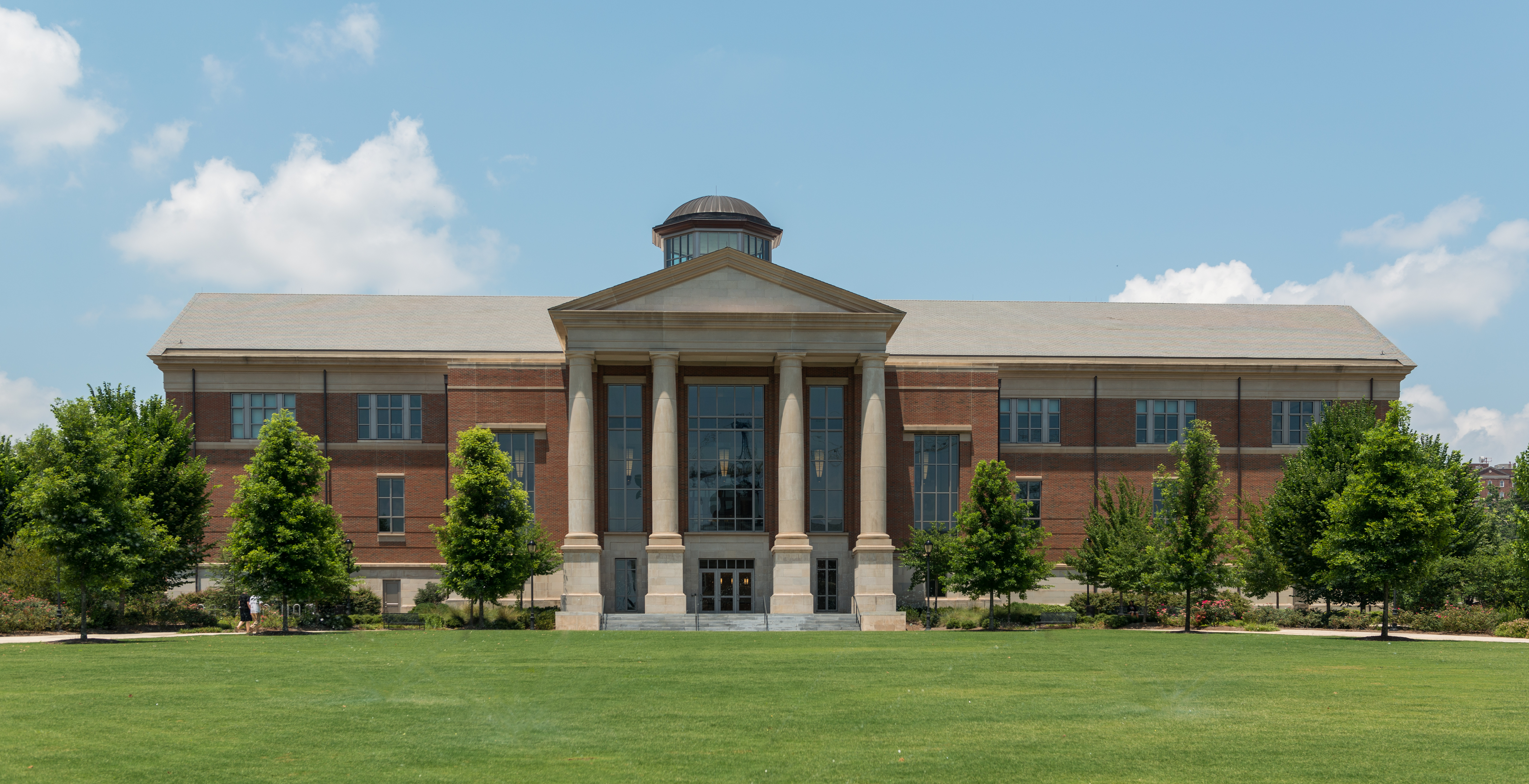
Blandina Dillard Russell and her five daughters are paid gratitude with this library located at the University of Georgia.

Russell's family migrated from Virginia to Georgia in 1802. In 1891, she married Richard Russell Sr. as his second wife. They began their new lives on a farm in Winder, Georgia. Ina and her sister, Patience Dillard, tutored their own kids until they went away to school around the age of thirteen. Ina Russell was never considered for office position. The Georgia State College for Women renamed its library to honor Ina and her five daughters, back in 1932. This library can be found in Athens, Georgia and another located at Georgia College and State University. Ina saw her daughter Carolyn, graduate from Agnes Scott in 1934. Afterwards, Carolyn began on her journey as a teacher in Blakely County, Georgia. Patience, Ina's daughter, gifted her with a diary in 1936 where she journaled a page a day.

== Personal life and death ==
Russell raised eight sons and seven daughters on the family farm in Winder, Georgia where she also managed several tenant farmers, while her husband pursued his career as a politician. Only 13 of her grew to be adults. She began her teaching career in the Washington Street School located near Athens, Georgia in 1889 at the third grader level. Her husband, Richard was a member on the Washington Street school board. It was recognized that Ina sewed more than 200 garments in 1912. While her kids were away, she would write them detailed letters. It's estimated that she wrote at least 3000 letters during their years of childhood. The letters explain how she manage to live a stable life while raising her 15 kids until their adulthood. She would typically write these letters in the mornings before her household was awake or in the evenings while everyone was sleeping. In her later years, Ina begin having trouble with her vision. Records show that she hired an amanuensis to help treat her vision conflicts. Ina was chosen as Georgia's Mother of the year May 11, 1950. Her death followed in 1953 from cerebral hemorrhage. Burial flags in Georgia dropped to honor her motherhood and work as a wife.

== Letters ==
Ina wrote thousands of letters to her family members. Alex, Ina's youngest son, received letters from his mother more often when he graduated from Emory School of Medicine in 1935. Russell's letters would have instructions to her children and family on living healthy, good behavior, and the importance of learning at a young age.

== Works cited ==
- Coleman, Kenneth; Gurr, Charles Stephen (1983). Dictionary of Georgia Biography. Athens, GA: University of Georgia Press.
- Fite, Gilbert C. (1991). Richard B. Russell, Jr., Senator from Georgia. Chapel Hill, NC: University of North Carolina Press.
- McCleary, Ann E. (2002). "Roots and Ever Green: Selected Letters of Ina Dillard Russell". ProQuest. ProQuest 215780117.
- Eady, David S. (n.d.). "Palmer Stone Elementary School". Oxford Historical Society.
- Russell, Ina (1999). Russell, Sally (ed.). Roots and Evergreen: The Selected Letters of Ina Dillard Russell. Macon, GA: University of Georgia Press. ISBN 9-780-8203-2138-7.
- Russell, Sally (2004). A Heart for Any Fate : The Biography of Richard Brevard Russell, Sr. Macon, GA: Mercer University Press. ISBN 0865549575.
- Dillard, Carlton (1997). Fielding Dillard (1771-1818) and Descendants.
