= Russell family (American political family) =

American political family

The Russell family is an American family from Georgia that has held prominent positions both in the United States government and the Georgia government. The family was a wealthy land-owning family until the end of the American Civil War, when they lost a large amount of their assets, like many others in the southern plantation class. The family later entered politics and rebuilt their family's prominence through holding political office.

== Family tree of notable members ==
- Richard B. Russell Sr. (1861–1938), Georgia state representative (1883–1889), state court of appeals chief judge (1907–1916), state supreme court chief justice (1922–1936); m. Ina Dillard
  - Richard B. Russell Jr. (1897–1971), Georgia state representative (1921–1931), state house speaker (1927–1931), governor (1931–1933), U.S. Senator (1933–1971)
  - Robert Lee Russell (1900–1955), U.S. district court judge (1940–1949), U.S. court of appeals judge (1949–1955); m. Sybil Millsaps
    - Robert Lee Russell Jr. (1925–1965), Georgia state representative (1951–1959), state court of appeals judge (1962–1965); m. Betty A. Campbell
    - Sybil Elizabeth Russell (1927–2018); m. Ernest Vandiver (1918–2005), Georgia adjutant general (1948–1954), lieutenant governor (1955–1959), governor (1959–1963)
      - Jane Brevard Vandiver (b. 1953), Georgia state representative (2005–2007), Democratic Party of Georgia chair (2007–2011); m. David A. Kidd
  - Patience Elizabeth Russell (1902–2002); m. Hugh Peterson (1898–1961), Georgia state representative (1923–1931), state senator (1931–1933), U.S. Representative (1935–1947)
  - Walter Brown Russell (1903–1986); m. Dorothea Bealer
    - Walter B. Russell Jr. (1929–2016), U.S. Army officer, Georgia state representative (1971–1977), DeKalb county commission chair (1977–1981); m. Nancy Hinton
    - Cecil Bealer Russell (1934–2022); m. Joseph G. Clemons (1928–2018), U.S. Army officer
  - Alexander Brevard Russell (1910–1995), Georgia state representative (1971–1973)
    - John D. Russell (b. 1946), Georgia state representative (1973–1986)
