= Houseboat (film) =

1958 film by Melville Shavelson

- Theatrical release poster
- Directed by: Melville Shavelson
- Written by: Melville Shavelson; Jack Rose; Betsy Drake (uncredited)
- Produced by: Jack Rose
- Starring: Cary Grant; Sophia Loren; Martha Hyer; Harry Guardino
- Cinematography: Ray June
- Edited by: Frank Bracht
- Music by: George Duning
- Distributed by: Paramount Pictures
- Release date: November 19, 1958
- Running time: 109 minutes
- Country: United States
- Language: English
- Box office: $3.5 million (rentals)

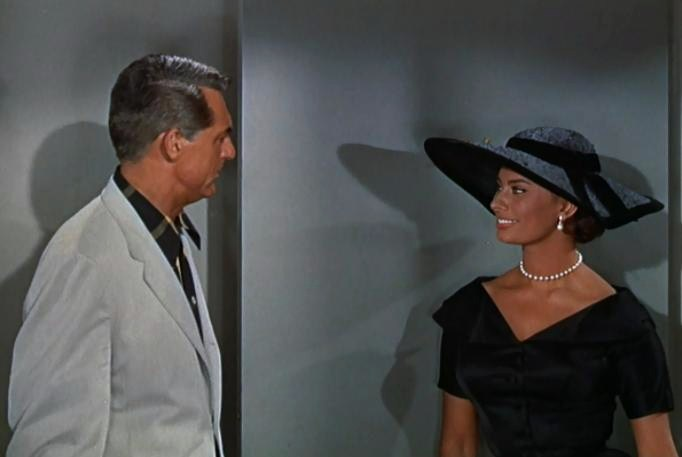
Grant and Loren

Houseboat is a 1958 American romantic comedy film directed by Melville Shavelson, written by Shavelson, Jack Rose, and Betsy Drake, and starring Cary Grant and Sophia Loren. It follows a widowed lawyer, accompanying three children and a nanny on a houseboat. The film was presented in Technicolor and VistaVision. It premiered on November 19, 1958.

The songs, "Almost In Your Arms" sung by Sam Cooke, and "Bing! Bang! Bong!", sung by Loren, were written by Jay Livingston and Ray Evans.

== Plot ==
For three years, Tom Winters, a lawyer working for the United States Department of State, has been separated from his wife and three children: David, Elizabeth, and Robert. He returns to Washington, D.C. from Europe after his wife dies. The children want to stay in the countryside with their mother's wealthy parents and her sister Carolyn, but instead Tom takes them to Washington. That night, they attend the Boston Symphony. Robert disrupts the concert by playing the harmonica. The conductor's daughter, a well-bred and affluent Italian woman, Cinzia, laughs. After the concert ends, Robert leaves the family and disappears. Cinzia has an argument with her father and ends up with Robert. They visit a carnival before Cinzia brings Robert home to a worried Tom. The next day, he hires Cinzia as a maid to care for the children. Misadventures follow as Tom attempts to move Cinzia and the children away from Washington to a house in the country. After a train destroys the house, they wind up as inhabitants of a leaky, rotting houseboat. However, a renovation of the premises proves successful, and their floating home becomes the backdrop for various episodes, where Tom discovers that Cinzia cannot cook, do laundry, or make coffee. David tries to leave in order to be with his aunt Carolyn. However, Tom rescues him when David nearly drowns. His sister-in-law, Carolyn, suspects that Cinzia's relationship with Tom is not entirely platonic. Tom's military aide, Captain Wilson, while somewhat drunk, jokes about Cinzia's living arrangement with Tom. All misunderstandings are explained, and Tom marries his maid as the children look on approvingly.

== Cast ==
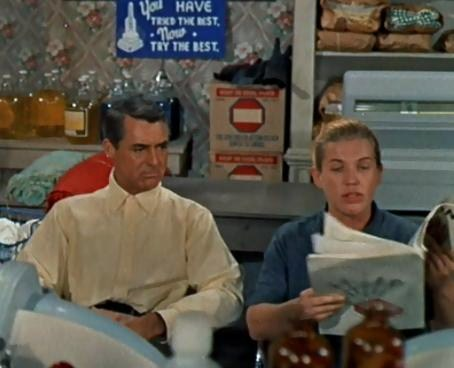
Grant and Freeman

- Cary Grant as Tom Winters
- Sophia Loren as Cinzia Zaccardi
- Martha Hyer as Carolyn Gibson
- Harry Guardino as Angelo Donatello
- Eduardo Ciannelli as Arturo Zaccardi
- Murray Hamilton as Capt. Alan Wilson
- Mimi Gibson as Elizabeth Winters
- Paul Petersen as David Winters
- Charles Herbert as Robert Winters
- Madge Kennedy as Mrs. Farnsworth
- John Litel as William Farnsworth
- Werner Klemperer as Harold Messner
- Susan Cabot as Mrs. Eleanor Wilson
- Kathleen Freeman as Laundromat gossip

== Production ==
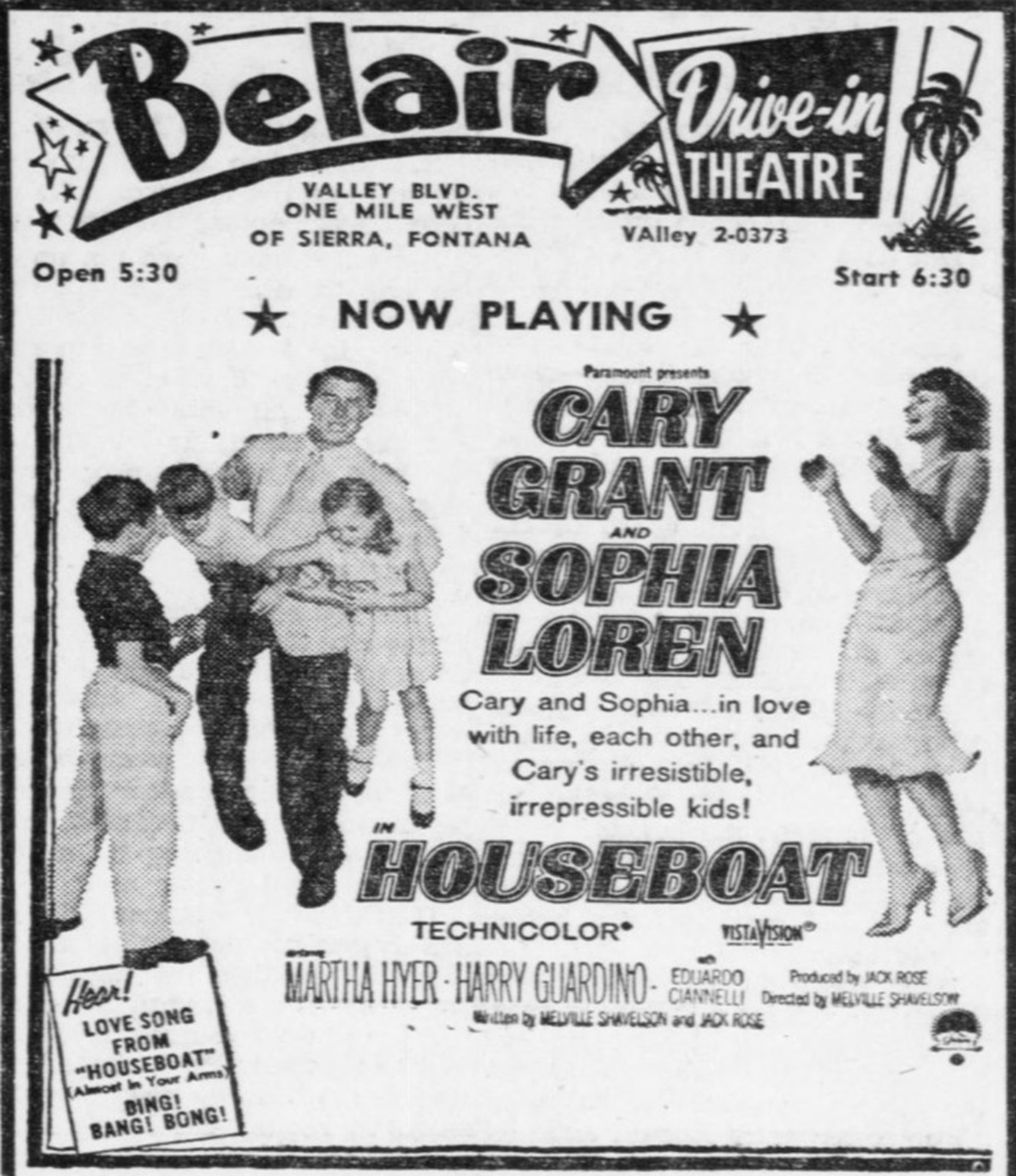
Drive-in advertisement from 1958

Betsy Drake wrote the original script, and Grant originally intended that she would star with him. However, Grant began an affair with Loren while filming The Pride and the Passion (1957); he arranged for her to take Drake's place with a rewritten script for which Drake did not receive credit. The affair ended in bitterness before The Pride and the Passion's filming ended, causing problems on the Houseboat set. Grant hoped to resume the relationship, but Loren agreed to marry Carlo Ponti instead.

== Reception ==
On Rotten Tomatoes, the film holds an approval rating of 58% based on 12 reviews, with an average rating of 5.9/10.

Wanda Hale of the New York Daily News gave the film a full four-star rating, remarking that it is "one of those screen rarities made solely for entertainment, conveying no message except the message that Sophia Loren finally communicates to Cary Grant." Jack Karr of the Toronto Daily Star recalled that "a thoroughly improbable set of circumstances has been brought together by Paramount Pictures to make "Houseboat’ a funny and appealing movie. The exact chemistry of this new production at the Imperial is not hard to analyze. It involves a mixture of color romance and some kept-in-check sentimentality along with a sort of brash offhand humor and a plausible though unlikely story line. With all these ingredients set out to cool, Director Melville Shavelson has worked up an amiable whimsy which may not be long remembered but which is there to be enjoyed while it lasts." John L. Scott of the Los Angeles Times described the film as "an agreeable light comedy" that "Should have happy sailing" while Selma Wilcox of the Los Angeles Evening Citizen-News said that it had "fun for everyone [...] if you like your fun far, far fetched." Hortense Morton of the San Francisco Examiner said that "without Grant, Houseboat might emerge a pleasant and lighthearted comedy dubbed with the kiss of death brush off as 'entertainment for the whole family.' With Grant, it doesn't quite work out this way. It's still good clean fun, but the actor gives it that extra fillip of sly charm which makes the film definitely adult entertainment. No easy triumph since much of the story revolves around three moppets." Helen Bower of the Detroit Free Press called it "an unusual domestic comedy" featuring three children who are "scene-stealers". Hope Pantell of the Baltimore Evening Sun called the comedy "a warmly appealing, sometimes very funny and sometimes very corny and sentimental family style film." Corbin Patrick of The Indianapolis Star called the film "a happy little holiday show, improbable but charming", while Charles Staff of The Indianapolis News remarked that it "has something for everybody". Harold Whitehead of the Montreal Gazette stated that Loren, "the statuesque Italian has done some impressive-dramatic work and now in Houseboat she is trying her hand at romantic comedy with equally good results." Sydney Johnson of the Montreal Star said that "the minutes pass pleasantly enough [...] mostly due to the expert performance of Cary Grant, the widower, and the several lively appearances of a refreshing personality named Harry Guardino. Mr. Guardino is one of the most likable newcomers to cross the screen in years and things really hum when he is around. Sophia Loren manages very nicely as the Italian visitor, the children are bearable and all the other parts are extremely well acted." Jay Carmody of the Washington Evening Star called the film "a good, healthy look at a family undergoing the daily travail of learning to live as a unit." Clyde Gilmour wrote in the Vancouver Sun that the movie told "a wacky story which easily could have been too silly for belief without a leading man of Cary Grant's skill and charm." Myles Standish of the St. Louis Post Dispatch described it as "that old-fashioned, improbable light comedy" which "has been prettied up with some palatable dialogue by Melville Shavelson and Jack Rose and does nicely as a vehicle for the slick Cary Grant." A user of the Mae Tinee pseudonym in the Chicago Daily Tribune said that "Cary Grant carries this rather thin little comedy on his broad and capable shoulders" while a critic for The Boston Globe said "if there's a picture that can be described [as being] 'for the whole family,' then 'Houseboat', at the Metropolitan Theater is the best bet of the season."

On the negative side, Bosley Crowther of The New York Times said that it "misses on two scores. First, it is in bad taste. The trumped-up pathos of motherless children and the aura of Miss Loren do not mix. Both are exaggerated in this elaborately synthetic film, but that's no warrant for making a tasteless mishmash of essentially clean sentiment and leering sex. With Miss Loren slinking about the houseboat in various revealing states of décolletage, designed to catch the audience's attention, as well as Mr. Grant's, it is offensive to pretend to be interested in the emotional disturbances of kids. In the second place, what has been concocted by the Messrs. Rose and Shavelson is extremely short on entertainment—and that's its more chargeable score." He added that "although Paul Petersen, Mimi Gibson and Charles Herbert look cute as the kids, their acting is generally affected under the direction of Mr. Shavelson. So is that of Miss Loren and the leathery Mr. Grant, who looks old enough to be the kids' grandfather." He concluded that "there are songs and some scenic shots of Washington in this Paramount color film, but they fail to provide this creaky Houseboat with much-needed buoyancy. A London-based critic for The Guardian wrote a scathing comment on the film, saying that "'Houseboat', which describes itself as a romantic comedy, is dedicated to the unacceptable proposition that modern, self-expressive, outspoken American children are necessarily adorable. The three children here chosen for our adoration are, in fact, horrors. Neither Cary Grant, a suave and talented player, nor the gorgeous Sophia Loren can atone for them. In this film, too, the trimmings are coloured and handsome but, thanks to the children, it is a film beyond redemption."

=== Awards and nominations ===
Award	Category	Nominee(s)	Result
Academy Awards	Best Story and Screenplay – Written Directly for the Screen	Melville Shavelson and Jack Rose	Nominated
Academy Awards	Best Song	"Almost In Your Arms (Love Song from Houseboat)"; Music and Lyrics by Jay Livingston and Ray Evans	Nominated
Bambi Awards	Best Actress – International	Sophia Loren	Nominated
Golden Globe Awards	Best Supporting Actor – Motion Picture	Harry Guardino	Nominated
Laurel Awards	Top Comedy		Won
Laurel Awards	Top Male Comedy Performance	Cary Grant	Won
Writers Guild of America Awards	Best Written American Comedy	Melville Shavelson and Jack Rose	Nominated

== See also ==
- List of American films of 1958
- Hum Hain Rahin Pyaar Ke (1993), a Bollywood film believed to have been inspired by Houseboat. It was directed by Mahesh Bhatt, who made several films believed to have been unofficially adapted from Hollywood films.
