= John Robert Brown (judge) =

American judge (1909–1993)

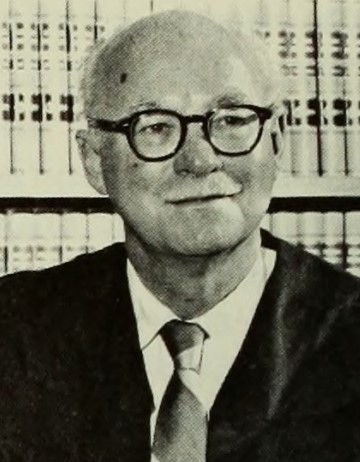

Senior Judge of the United States Court of Appeals for the Fifth Circuit
- In office July 20, 1984 – January 23, 1993

Chief Judge of the United States Court of Appeals for the Fifth Circuit
- In office 1967–1979
- Preceded by: Elbert Tuttle
- Succeeded by: James P. Coleman

Judge of the United States Court of Appeals for the Fifth Circuit
- In office July 27, 1955 – July 20, 1984
- Appointed by: Dwight D. Eisenhower
- Preceded by: Robert Lee Russell
- Succeeded by: Robert Madden Hill

Personal details
- Born: John Robert Brown; December 10, 1909 Funk, Nebraska, U.S.
- Died: January 23, 1993 (aged 83) Houston, Texas, U.S.
- Party: Republican
- Education: University of Nebraska (AB); University of Michigan (JD)

John Robert Brown (December 10, 1909 – January 23, 1993) was a United States circuit judge of the United States Court of Appeals for the Fifth Circuit in 1950s and 1960s, one of the "Fifth Circuit Four" pivotal in the civil rights movement.

== Education and career ==
Born on December 10, 1909, in Funk, Nebraska, Brown received an Artium Baccalaureus degree in 1930 from the University of Nebraska and a Juris Doctor in 1932 from the University of Michigan Law School. Brown entered private practice in Houston and Galveston, Texas from 1932 to 1955, except for 1942 to 1946, when he served as a Major in the United States Army during World War II. He was employed at the law firm of Royston Rayzor and specialized in admiralty law.

== Federal judicial service ==
Brown was nominated by President Dwight D. Eisenhower on April 25, 1955, to a seat on the United States Court of Appeals for the Fifth Circuit vacated by Judge Robert Lee Russell. He was confirmed by the United States Senate on July 22, 1955, and received his commission on July 27, 1955. He served as Chief Judge and as a member of the Judicial Conference of the United States from 1967 to 1979. He assumed senior status on July 20, 1984. He was the last federal appeals court judge in active service to have been appointed to his position by President Eisenhower. (Note: Frank Minis Johnson, who remained an active appellate judge until October 1991, was originally appointed by Eisenhower to the Middle District of Alabama, but was elevated to the appeals courts by Jimmy Carter.) His service terminated on January 23, 1993, due to his death in Houston.

=== Fifth Circuit Four ===
Brown became known as one of the "Fifth Circuit Four"—Brown, Elbert Tuttle, Richard Rives, and John Minor Wisdom—so called because of a series of decisions crucial in advancing the civil rights of African-Americans. At that time, the Fifth Circuit included not only Louisiana, Mississippi, and Texas (its jurisdiction as of 1981), but also Alabama, Georgia, Florida, and the Panama Canal Zone.

=== Role in split of the old Fifth Circuit ===
During his service as Chief Judge, Brown was crucial to the administrative actions splitting the new Eleventh Circuit (Alabama, Georgia and Florida) from the Old Fifth Circuit, which included those states up to September 1981, leaving the current Fifth Circuit with Texas, Louisiana and Mississippi.

== Honors ==
The Judge John R. Brown Admiralty Moot Court Competition was established shortly before Brown's death and is now held annually, sponsored by the University of Texas School of Law. The Judge Brown Admiralty Collection at the O'Quinn Law Library at the University of Houston Law Center is named in Brown's honor.

== See also ==
- List of United States federal judges by longevity of service

== Notes ==
Legal offices
Preceded by Robert Lee Russell	Judge of the United States Court of Appeals for the Fifth Circuit; 1955–1984	Succeeded by Robert Madden Hill
Preceded by Elbert Tuttle	Chief Judge of the United States Court of Appeals for the Fifth Circuit; 1967–1979	Succeeded by James P. Coleman
