= Braswell Deen Jr. =

American politician and judge (1925–2020)

Judge of the Georgia Court of Appeals
- In office 1965–1990
- Appointed by: Carl Sanders
- Preceded by: Robert L. Russell Jr.
- Succeeded by: Gary Andrews

Member of the Georgia House of Representatives from Bacon County
- In office January 8, 1951 – January 9, 1961
- Preceded by: Andrew J. Tuten
- Succeeded by: H. Dorsey Deen

Personal details
- Born: Braswell Drue Deen Jr. August 16, 1925 McRae, Georgia, U.S.
- Died: December 24, 2020 (aged 95) Marietta, Georgia, U.S.
- Party: Democratic
- Spouse: Jean Buie (m. 1953)
- Children: 2 sons
- Parents: Braswell Deen (father); Corinne Smith Deen (mother)
- Education: University of Georgia (LLB)
- Occupation: Lawyer; politician

Military service
- Branch/service: United States Marine Corps
- Battles/wars: World War II; Asia–Pacific theater; Battle of Peleliu; Battle of Okinawa
- Awards: Purple Heart

Braswell Drue Deen Jr. (August 16, 1925 – December 24, 2020) was an American former politician and judge. He served in the Georgia House of Representatives and later as judge on the Georgia Court of Appeals. He is the son of former Georgia congressman Braswell Deen.

== Biography ==
Braswell Deen was born to parents Braswell Deen Sr and Corinne Smith Deen, on 16 August 1925, in McRae Georgia. After Graduating high school in Alma. He then enlisted in the United States Marine Corps during World War II, participating in the invasion of Peleliu and Battle of Okinawa. During the latter battle, he sustained an injury which hospitalized him for the rest of the war. For his efforts, he was awarded a Purple Heart. He then went on to the University of Georgia, earning a Bachelors of Law degree in 1950, and he served in the Georgia House of Representatives from 1951 to 1960. In 1965, he was appointed as judge of the Georgia Court of Appeals by Governor Carl Sanders to complete the remainder of Robert Lee Russell Jr.'s term. He was later elected to his own full term in 1966 served until his retirement in 1990.

== Personal life ==
Braswell married Jean Buie in 1953 and had two sons. He died on December 24, 2020, in Marietta, Georgia, at the age of 95.
