= Plunging fire =

Indirect gunfire fired at a high angle trajectory to fall on to a target or enemy

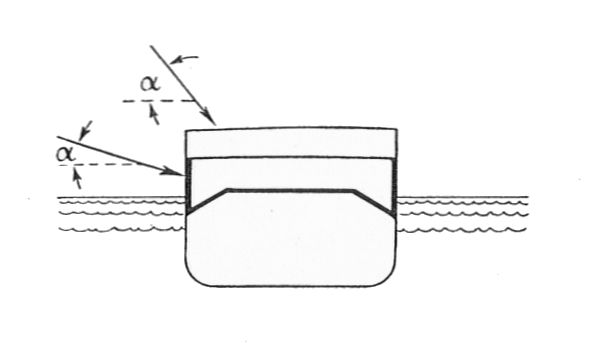
Plunging fire on a warship: the steeper angle of fire allows the shell to hit the thinner deck armor

Plunging fire is a form of indirect fire, where gunfire is fired at a trajectory to make it fall on its target from above. It is normal at the high trajectories used to attain long range, and can be used deliberately to attack a target not susceptible to direct or grazing fire due to not being in direct line of sight.

In naval warfare, plunging fire is theoretically capable of penetrating an enemy ship's thinner deck armor rather than firing directly at a warship's heavily armored side.

Plunging fire in terrestrial warfare allows attacking a target not in direct line of sight, for example over the brow of a hill engaging in a reverse slope defence. Artillery weapons such as howitzers and mortars are designed for this purpose. Machine guns and belt-fed grenade launchers may also use plunging fire.

The Vickers machine gun was used for indirect fire against enemy positions at ranges up to 4,500 yd (4,115 m) with Mark VIIIz ammunition. This plunging fire was used to great effect against specific features or points of interest that might be observed by a forward observer, or zeroed in at one time for future attacks, much to the surprise and confusion of the enemy.

The Australian Army still trains specialist infantry units, called Direct Fires Support Weapons DFSW teams, to perform an indirect sustained fire role with the MAG 58 GPMG, fitted with a C2A2 Support Weapons Sight - similar to a mortar sight. In this role the MAG 58 can fire a beaten zone up to a range 3,000 m (1.9 mi).

== See also ==
- Top-attack
- Ballistic coefficient
- Grazing fire
