= Homer C. Parker =

American politician

Homer Cling Parker

Member of the U.S. House of Representatives from Georgia's 1st district
- In office September 9, 1931 – January 3, 1935
- Preceded by: Charles G. Edwards
- Succeeded by: Hugh Peterson

Personal details
- Born: September 25, 1885 Baxley, Georgia, U.S.
- Died: June 22, 1946 (aged 60) Atlanta, Georgia, U.S.
- Resting place: East Side Cemetery, Statesboro, Georgia
- Party: Democratic
- Education: Statesboro High School; Mercer University (1908)
- Occupation: Lawyer, politician

Military service
- Allegiance: United States
- Branch/service: United States Army; Georgia National Guard
- Years of service: 1917–1922 (U.S. Army); 1927–1931 (National Guard)
- Rank: Major (U.S. Army); Adjutant General (Georgia)

Homer Cling Parker (September 25, 1885 – June 22, 1946) was a U.S. Representative from Georgia.

Born in Baxley, Georgia, Parker attended the public schools. He graduated from Statesboro High School, Statesboro, Georgia in 1904 and Mercer University, Macon, Georgia in 1908. He was in the United States Army from 1917 to 1922 during the World War I era, where he was a captain in the infantry. He continued in the Judge Advocate General's Corps, United States Army and was stationed at Camp Gordon, Georgia, becoming a major.

He was a lawyer in private practice. He served as solicitor of the city court from 1914 to 1917. He served as mayor of Statesboro, Georgia from 1924 to 1927. He served in the Georgia National Guard from 1927 to 1931 and was appointed as the state adjutant general.

Parker was elected as a Democrat to the Seventy-second Congress to fill the vacancy caused by the death of United States Representative Charles G. Edwards. He was reelected to the Seventy-third Congress (September 9, 1931 – January 3, 1935). He served as chair of the Committee on Elections No. 1 (Seventy-third Congress). He was an unsuccessful candidate for renomination in 1934. He was appointed comptroller general of Georgia, 1936–1937.

Parker was elected comptroller general of Georgia from 1940 to 1946. He died on June 22, 1946, in Atlanta, Georgia. He was interred in East Side Cemetery, Statesboro, Georgia.

U.S. House of Representatives
Preceded by Charles G. Edwards	Member of the U.S. House of Representatives from Georgia's 1st congressional district September 9, 1931 – January 3, 1935	Succeeded by Hugh Peterson
