= Harry Guardino =

American actor (1925–1995)

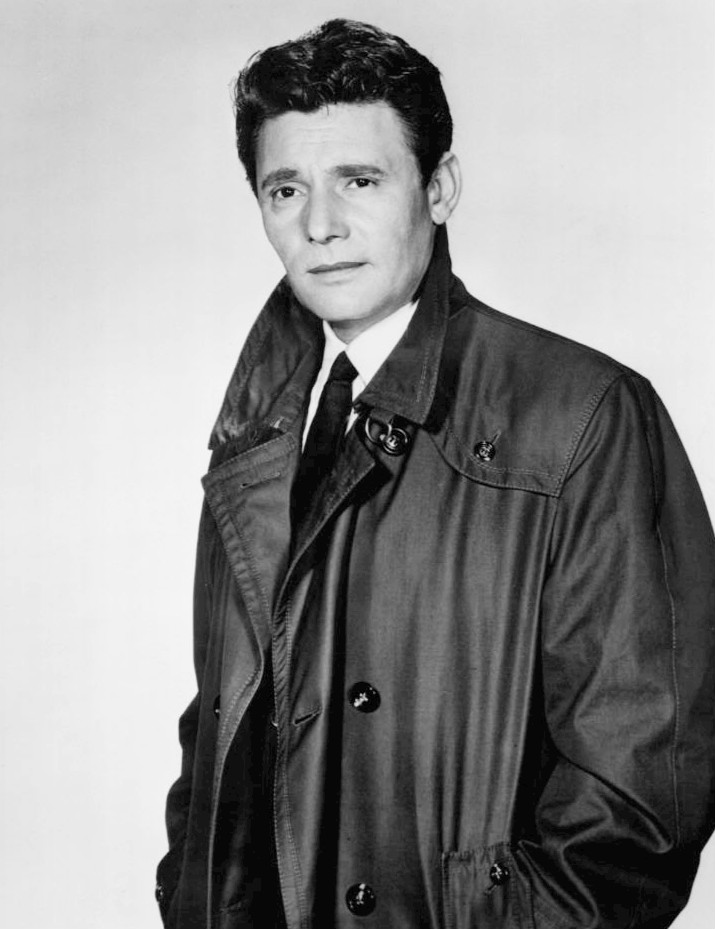
- Guardino in 1964
- Born: Harold Vincent Guardino; December 23, 1925; New York City, U.S.
- Died: July 17, 1995 (aged 69); Palm Springs, California, U.S.
- Occupation: Actor
- Years active: 1951–1993
- Height: 5 ft 10 in (1.78 m)
- Spouses: Ann Norwood (m. 1958; div. 1969) Jennifer Revson (m. 1973; div. 1974) Elyssa Paternoster (m. 1985)

Harold Vincent Guardino (December 23, 1925 – July 17, 1995) was an American actor whose career ran from the early 1950s to the early 1990s.

== Biography ==
Guardino was born on December 23, 1925 on the Lower East Side of Manhattan and raised in Brooklyn, New York. He joined a Police Athletic League dramatic group while attending high school. After graduation, Guardino joined the Navy, serving in World War II. After the war, he became a merchant seaman. Guardino appeared on stage, in films, and on television. His Broadway theatre credits included A Hatful of Rain, One More River (earning a Tony Award nomination for Best Featured Actor in a Play for his performance), Anyone Can Whistle, The Rose Tattoo, The Seven Descents of Myrtle, and Woman of the Year.

Guardino's other film credits include Houseboat, Pork Chop Hill (about the Korean War), The Five Pennies, King of Kings, Madigan, Lovers and Other Strangers, Dirty Harry and The Enforcer. He was nominated twice for the Golden Globe Award for Best Supporting Actor, for Houseboat and The Pigeon That Took Rome.

In 1971, Guardino starred in the short-lived series Monty Nash. Guardino had a continuing role as Perry Mason's nemesis Hamilton Burger in the 1973 television series The New Perry Mason and a recurring role on Murder, She Wrote. He made guest appearances in dozens of television series, including Studio One, Target: The Corruptors!, The Eleventh Hour, Untouchables, Alfred Hitchcock Presents, Kraft Television Theatre, Playhouse 90, Dr. Kildare, The Lloyd Bridges Show, Route 66, Ben Casey, Hawaii Five-O, Night Gallery, Twelve O'Clock High, Love, American Style, The Greatest Show on Earth, Kojak, Wonder Woman, Hunter, The F.B.I., The Streets of San Francisco, Jake and the Fatman, Fantasy Island and Cheers. He had the lead role of Det. Lee Gordon in the 1969 TV movie The Lonely Profession.

In 1993, a Golden Palm Star on the Palm Springs Walk of Stars was dedicated to him.

== Death ==
Guardino died of lung cancer in Desert Hospital in Palm Springs, California on July 17, 1995.

== Personal life ==
Guardino was married three times and had a son and daughter. Guardino married Ann Norwood in 1958 and divorced in 1969. He then married Jennifer Revson in 1973, and they divorced in 1974. Guardino married Elyssa Paternoster in 1985 and they remained together until his death in 1995.

== Filmography ==
Year	Title	Role	Notes
1951	Up Front	Orderly	uncredited
1951	Sirocco	Lieutenant Collet	uncredited
1951	Purple Heart Diary	Lieutenant Roberts	
1952	Flesh and Fury	Lou Callan, Paul's brother	
1952	Son of Ali Baba	Hamid, Ali's Cadet Friend	uncredited
1955	The Big Tip Off	Hood #2	
1955	Hold Back Tomorrow	Detective	
1955	The Court Jester	Forester	uncredited
1957	Alfred Hitchcock Presents	Gerry Daniels	Season 3 Episode 8: "Last Request"
1958	Houseboat	Angelo Donatello	
1959	Pork Chop Hill	Private Forstman	
1959	The Five Pennies	Tony Valani	
1960	Five Branded Women	Branco	
1961	King of Kings	Barabbas	
1962	The Pigeon That Took Rome	Sergeant Joseph Angelico	
1962	Hell Is For Heroes	Sergeant Larkin	
1964	Rhino!	Alec Burnett	
1965	The Virginian	Sam Willick	Season 4 Episode 13: "The Horsefighter"
1966	Treasure of San Gennaro	Jack	
1967	The Adventures of Bullwhip Griffin	Sam Trimble	
1968	Madigan	Detective Rocco Bonaro	
1968	Jigsaw	Arthur Belding	
1968	The Hell with Heroes	Lee Harris	
1969	Hawaii Five-O	Sgt. Simms	Season 2 Episode 1: "A Thousand Pardons - You're Dead!"
1970	Lovers and Other Strangers	Johnny	
1970	Hawaii Five-O	Mike	Season 3 Episode 2: "Trouble In Mind"
1971	Red Sky at Morning	Romeo Bonino	
1971	Dirty Harry	Lieutenant Al Bressler	
1971	Slingshot	unknown	
1972	They Only Kill Their Masters	Captain Daniel Streeter	
1975	Hawaii Five-O	Commander Wallace	Season 8 Episode 1: "Murder Eyes Only"
1975	Capone	Johnny "The Fox" Torrio	
1975	Whiffs	"Chops" Mulligan	
1976	St. Ives	Detective Frank Deal	
1976	The Enforcer	Lieutenant Al Bressler	
1977	Rollercoaster	Keefer	
1977	Contract on Cherry Street	Ron Polito	
1978	Matilda	Uncle Nono	
1978	Evening in Byzantium	Jerry Olson	
1978	Every Which Way but Loose	James Beekman	uncredited
1979	Hawaii Five-O	Johnny Mio	Season 12 Episode 1: "A Lion in the Streets"
1979	Goldengirl	Valenti	
1980	Any Which Way You Can	James Beekman	
1987	The Law & Harry McGraw	Angelo Spinelli	Season 1 Episode 6: "She's Not Wild About Harry"
1988	Alfred Hitchcock Presents	Phil Mansfield	Season 3 Episode 13: "User Deadly"
1989	The Neon Empire	Nick	
1991	Under Surveillance	Ben Hirsch	
1993	Fist of Honor	Dino Diamond	
1993	Murder, She Wrote	Danny Cochran	Season 9 Episode 14: "Killer Radio"
