= Robert L. Russell Jr. =

Judge of the Georgia Court of Appeals
- In office February 9, 1962 – June 14, 1965
- Appointed by: Ernest Vandiver
- Preceded by: Vance Custer
- Succeeded by: Braswell Deen Jr.

Member of the Georgia House of Representatives from Barrow County
- In office January 8, 1951 – January 12, 1959
- Preceded by: J. Julian Bennett
- Succeeded by: James W. Paris

Personal details
- Born: Robert Lee Russell Jr. February 21, 1925 Winder, Georgia, U.S.
- Died: June 14, 1965 (aged 40) Bethesda, Maryland, U.S.
- Party: Democratic
- Spouse: Betty Ann Campbell (m. 1949)
- Children: 5
- Parent: Robert Lee Russell (father)
- Relatives: Russell family
- Education: University of Georgia (LLB)
- Occupation: Lawyer; politician

Military service
- Branch/service: United States Marine Corps
- Unit: 29th Marine Regiment
- Battles/wars: World War II; Asia–Pacific theater; Battle of Okinawa
- Awards: Purple Heart

Robert Lee Russell Jr. (February 21, 1925 – June 14, 1965) was an American lawyer and politician. Born into the Russell political family of the U.S. state of Georgia, he followed his grandfather, uncle, and father into political life, serving 4 terms in the Georgia House of Representatives and as judge of the Georgia Court of Appeals.
