= Grazing fire =

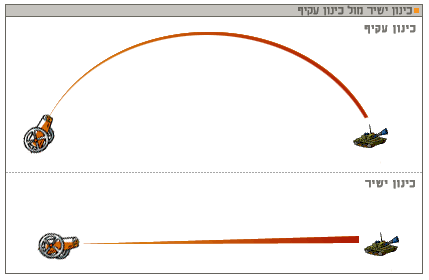
Image depicting alternative options for firing in military situations. The bottom half demonstrates grazing fire as a concept

Grazing fire is a term used in military science and defined by NATO and the United States Department of Defense as "Fire approximately parallel to the ground where the center of the cone of fire does not rise above one meter from the ground." Grazing fire is often performed by machine guns. It is tactically advantageous when attempting to cut off an infantry ground assault or counter-attack.

In grazing fire, the cone of fire does not exceed 1.8 metres (5 ft 11 in)—the average height of a soldier—above the ground. When each bullet is fired, it will leave the barrel of the weapon at the axis of bore set from the angle of sight desired to strike the target area. The trajectory of the round should be constant as well as maximum ordinate. Maximum ordinate is the highest point of the trajectory, which is usually two-thirds the distance to the target from the weapon. Depending on the caliber of the round being fired and the slope of the terrain, as well as the distance to the target, the bullet will maintain a semi-flat trajectory. With 7.62×51mm NATO ammunition, which is most commonly used with, for example, the M240 machine gun, the bullet will reach a distance of 600 metres (2,000 ft) traveling at 900 metres per second (3,000 ft/s), before it begins a pronounced downward trajectory to the earth. Any distance beyond that range will be considered plunging fire due to the arc (axis of bore plus angle of sight) needed to impact the target area.

Grazing fire is so named because it cuts the vegetation low as though a herd of cattle had been grazing there. The optimal height of fire should be at knee height. In addition to keeping the enemy pinned down, anybody wounded or going to cover will fall into the line of fire, not out of it.
