= Russell, Georgia =

- Unincorporated community Census-designated place
- Location within Georgia
- Coordinates: 33°58′43″N 83°42′0″W
- Country: United States
- State: Georgia
- County: Barrow

Area
  - Total: 1.16 sq mi (3.01 km^{2})
  - Land: 1.16 sq mi (3.01 km^{2})
  - Water: 0 sq mi (0.00 km^{2})
- Elevation: 980 ft (300 m)

Population (2020)
  - Total: 1,322
  - Density: 1,137.8/sq mi (439.32/km^{2})
- Time zone: UTC-5 (Eastern (EST))
  - Summer (DST): UTC-4 (EDT)
- ZIP code: 30680
- FIPS code: 13-67676
- GNIS feature ID: 0332944

Russell is an unincorporated community and census-designated place (CDP) in Barrow County, Georgia, United States. As of the 2020 census, Russell had a population of 1,322.

== History ==
The community most likely was named after Richard Russell Sr. (1861–1938), chief justice of the Georgia Supreme Court.

The Georgia General Assembly incorporated Russell in 1902. The city's municipal charter was repealed in 1995.

== Geography ==
Russell is located in central Barrow County at 33°58′43″N 83°42′0″W. It is bordered to the north and west by the city of Winder, the Barrow County seat.

According to the United States Census Bureau, the CDP has a total area of 1.2 square miles (3.1 km^{2}), all land.

== Demographics ==
Historical population
Census	Pop.	Note	%±
2010	1,203		—
2020	1,322		9.9%
U.S. Decennial Census; 1850-1870 1870-1880; 1890-1910 1920-1930; 1940 1950 1960; 1970 1980 1990; 2000 2010 2020

Russell first appeared as a census designated place in the 2020 U.S. census.

=== Racial and ethnic composition ===
Russell CDP, Georgia – Racial and ethnic composition Note: the US Census treats Hispanic/Latino as an ethnic category. This table excludes Latinos from the racial categories and assigns them to a separate category. Hispanics/Latinos may be of any race.
Race / Ethnicity (NH = Non-Hispanic)	Pop 2010	Pop 2020	% 2010	% 2020
White alone (NH)	714	680	59.35%	51.44%
Black or African American alone (NH)	189	179	15.71%	13.54%
Native American or Alaska Native alone (NH)	7	1	0.58%	0.08%
Asian alone (NH)	51	61	4.24%	4.61%
Pacific Islander alone (NH)	0	0	0.00%	0.00%
Other race alone (NH)	7	11	0.58%	0.83%
Mixed race or Multiracial (NH)	31	54	2.58%	4.08%
Hispanic or Latino (any race)	204	336	16.96%	25.42%
Total	1,203	1,322	100.00%	100.00%

=== 2020 census ===
As of the 2020 census, Russell had a population of 1,322. The median age was 32.0 years. 29.7% of residents were under the age of 18 and 8.7% of residents were 65 years of age or older. For every 100 females there were 107.9 males, and for every 100 females age 18 and over there were 100.9 males age 18 and over.

100.0% of residents lived in urban areas, while 0.0% lived in rural areas.

There were 420 households in Russell, of which 44.0% had children under the age of 18 living in them. Of all households, 41.7% were married-couple households, 22.4% were households with a male householder and no spouse or partner present, and 25.7% were households with a female householder and no spouse or partner present. About 19.6% of all households were made up of individuals and 6.9% had someone living alone who was 65 years of age or older.

There were 448 housing units, of which 6.2% were vacant. The homeowner vacancy rate was 0.9% and the rental vacancy rate was 6.3%.

== Education ==
It is in Barrow County Schools. Zoned schools include Holsenbeck Elementary School and Winder-Barrow High School.
