= Arthur Trudeau =

United States Army general

Arthur G. Trudeau
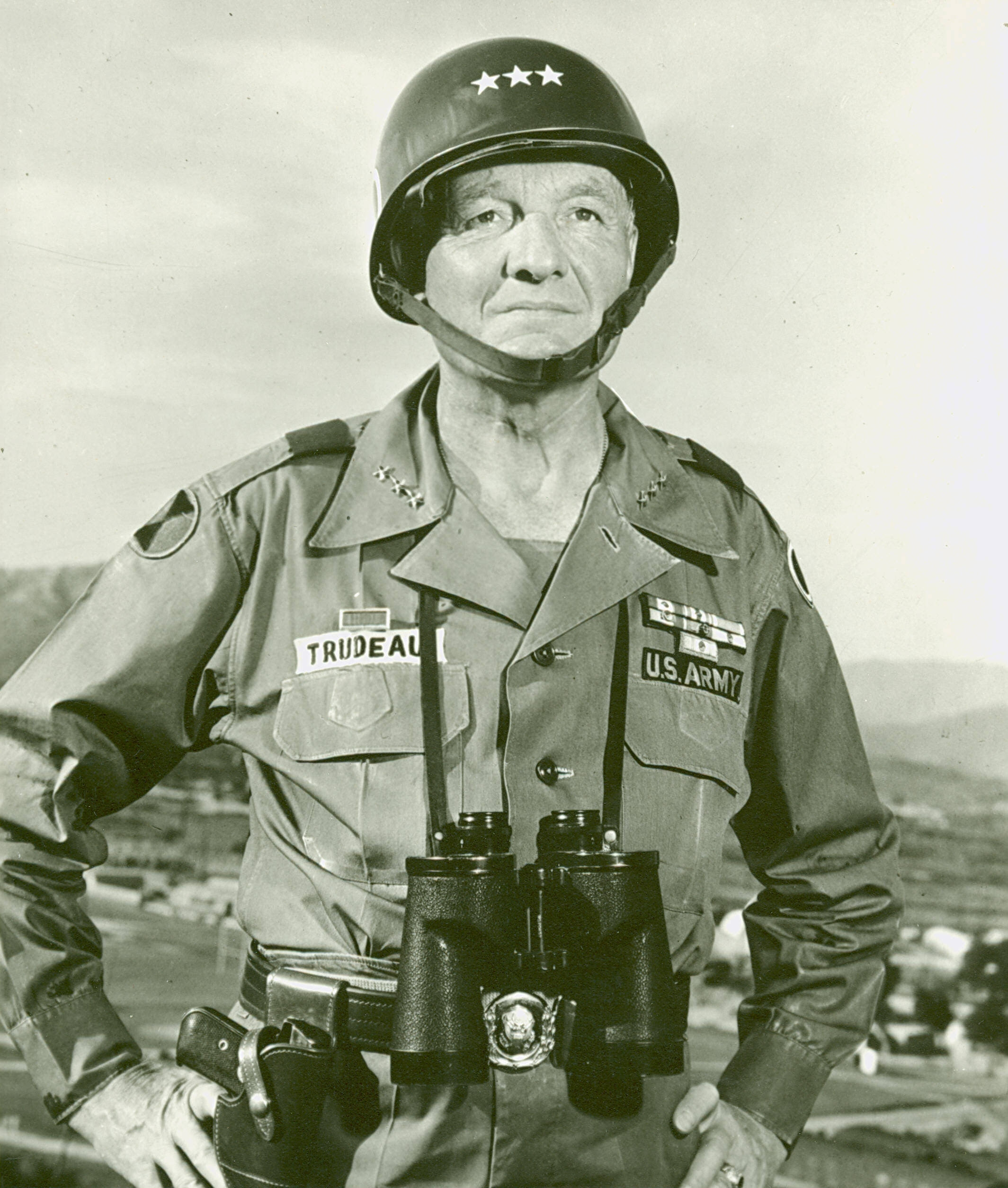
- Trudeau in OG-107 uniform
- Born: 5 July 1902; Middlebury, Vermont, U.S.
- Died: 5 June 1991 (aged 88); Chevy Chase, Maryland, U.S.
- Burial place: Arlington National Cemetery, Arlington County, Virginia, U.S.
- Military career
- Allegiance: United States
- Branch: United States Army
- Service years: 1920–1962
- Rank: Lieutenant General
- Commands: I Corps; Military Intelligence Corps; 7th Infantry Division; 1st Cavalry Division
- Conflicts: World War II: Pacific War; Korean War: Battle of Pork Chop Hill
- Awards: Army Distinguished Service Medal (3); Silver Star (2); Legion of Merit; Bronze Star Medal
- Other work: President, Gulf Research Development Company

Arthur Gilbert Trudeau (5 July 1902 – 5 June 1991) was a lieutenant general in the United States Army. He is best known for his command of the 7th Infantry Division during the Battle of Pork Chop Hill in the Korean War.

== Early life and education ==
Trudeau was born in Middlebury, Vermont, on 5 July 1902, and entered the United States Military Academy at West Point in 1920. He graduated in the Class of 1924 and later served in the 104th Engineers of the New Jersey National Guard.

== Career ==
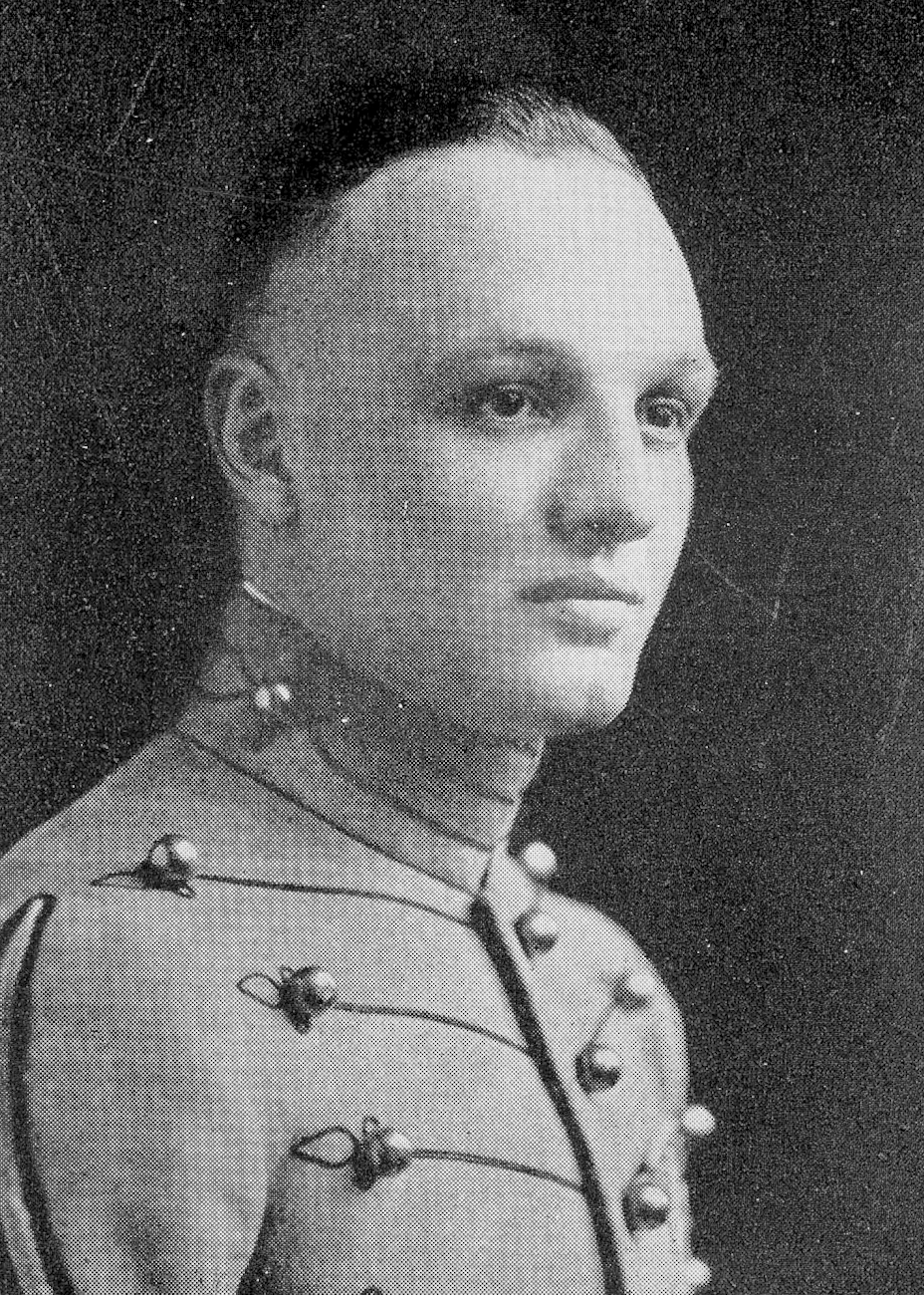
At West Point in 1924

In 1942 Trudeau was assigned to be Chief of Staff for the newly formed Engineer Amphibian Command. Organized in the early spring at Camp Edwards on Cape Cod, Massachusetts, Washburn Island, between Falmouth and Mashpee on Cape Cod's south shore, became the main training area. In 1944, Trudeau was promoted to brigadier general. Considered a specialist in amphibious warfare as the prior chief of staff of the Engineer Amphibian Command, he assumed command of a secret base in the Philippines in 1945, assisting in the preparation for an invasion of Japan that never happened.

In January 1946, Trudeau was appointed as a judge at the military tribunal of Gen. Masaharu Homma in view of the war crimes committed by his command during the invasion of the Philippines, sitting on the bench along with Major General Leo Donovan, Major General Basilio Valdes, Brig. Gen. Robert G. Gard, and Brig. Gen. Warren H. McNaught.

After the war, he served in Germany, before becoming deputy commander of the United States Army War College in 1950.

One of Trudeau's last parades in Korea, for the first deployment of U.S. atomic weapons in Korea in 1958

During the Korean War, Trudeau commanded the 1st Cavalry Division, and later the 7th Infantry Division. He received the Silver Star by personally leading a reconnaissance team to scout a strategic position, Pork Chop Hill, while it was under heavy enemy fire. He was named chief of army intelligence in October 1953, but was relieved of his command 20 months later when Allen W. Dulles, Director of Central Intelligence, sent a scathing memorandum of complaints to the Pentagon. Although the contents of the memorandum were not made public, Trudeau was noted for his vigorous anti-Communist statements, and he often clashed with other government officials over their differing views of communist intentions. He returned to Korea to take command of I Corps. On 18 October 1956, Trudeau was promoted to lieutenant general. In 1958, he returned to Washington as director of Army research and development.

== Later life and death ==
Upon retirement from the army in 1962, Trudeau went on to head Gulf Labs of the Gulf Oil Corporation in Pittsburgh until 1968. He then served as a special adviser to the chairman of Pittsburgh's Rockwell International aerospace firm until 1972.

Throughout his military service, Trudeau was an outspoken advocate of racial integration of the military. He also said it was in the nation's best interests that educational opportunities be provided for the disadvantaged so they could take advantage of new career openings. Trudeau is a member of the Military Intelligence Hall of Fame.

Trudeau died on 5 June 1991, in Chevy Chase, Maryland, and was buried at Arlington National Cemetery.

== Awards and decorations ==
- Distinguished Service Medal with two oak leaf clusters
- Silver Star with oak leaf cluster
- Legion of Merit
- Bronze Star Medal
- Air Medal
- Philippine Liberation Medal
- Commander of the Order of Leopold II
- Order of Boyacá
- Order of the Rising Sun
- Knight Commander of the Order of the Sword
- United Nations Medal
