= Joseph G. Clemons =

US Army soldier (1928–2018)

Joseph Gordon Clemons, Jr.
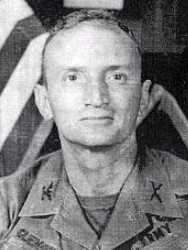
- Colonel Joseph G. Clemons, Jr.
- Born: April 30, 1928; Cleveland, Ohio, U.S.
- Died: May 15, 2018 (aged 90); Hendersonville, North Carolina, U.S.
- Spouse: Cecil Russell
- Military career
- Allegiance: United States of America
- Branch: U.S. Army
- Service years: 1946–1977
- Rank: Colonel
- Commands: K Company, 31st Infantry Regiment; 198th Infantry Brigade
- Battles: Korean War: Pork Chop Hill; Vietnam War
- Awards: Distinguished Service Cross; Silver Star; Bronze Star with V device

Colonel Joseph Gordon Clemons, Jr. (April 30, 1928 – May 15, 2018) was a soldier in the United States Army in the Korean War and in the Vietnam War. His actions in the 1953 Battle of Pork Chop Hill were the subject of a 1959 movie, Pork Chop Hill.

== Early life ==
Clemons's father was also Joseph G. Clemons. Clemons lived for a while and attended elementary school in Hillsborough County, Florida. Clemons graduated from Baltimore Polytechnic Institute in 1945 and enlisted in the Army, serving for eighteen months before being appointed to West Point. He graduated from the United States Military Academy in 1951 (Cullum number 18024). During the Korean War, his residence was Arlington, Virginia.

== Korean War ==
Clemons was awarded the Distinguished Service Cross while serving as a platoon leader in Company K, 31st Infantry Regiment for "heroism in action against the enemy in the vicinity of Kumhwa, Korea, October 28, 1952", a part of the Battle of Triangle Hill. In that action, Clemons led the attack platoon in a counterattack, leading multiple attacks with limited ammunition, including hand-to-hand fighting. On April 17, 1953, after being assigned as the commanding officer of Company K while still a first lieutenant, he led the counterattack on Pork Chop Hill. He was awarded the Silver Star for his part in this action. In his Silver Star citation, Clemons's "gallantry, personal example, and outstanding leadership" was cited as the major factor in taking and holding the position, commenting further that "rarely in combat history has a force of the size committed on Pork Chop taken such losses ... and nevertheless continued to hold their position". At one point during the battle, Clemons estimated that he had lost approximately half his force. During the battle Clemons was reinforced by G Company, 17th Infantry Regiment, commanded by his brother-in-law, Walter B. Russell Jr.

Clemons and his command served as the centerpiece of a book by S.L.A. Marshall called Pork Chop Hill which was turned into a 1959 movie, Pork Chop Hill. In the movie, he was portrayed by Gregory Peck, and Clemons served as a technical adviser.

== Later career ==
After the Korean War, Clemons was stationed at Fort Campbell as an officer in the 101st Airborne Division. As a lieutenant colonel, he commanded the 2/54 Infantry Battalion, 4th Armored Division, in Bamberg, Germany. Later in his service, he rose to the rank of colonel and became the commander of 198th Infantry Brigade in 1969 during the Vietnam War. While commanding the 198th, he ordered that his personal helicopter be used for medical resupply and evacuation missions. On a mission in 1970, he landed when one of his units was pinned down by intense enemy fire. Clemons ordered his pilot to pick up and evacuate the wounded while he remained on the ground; he was awarded the Bronze Star with V device for valor. He was awarded the Distinguished Graduate Award in 2007 by the West Point Association of Graduates.

He was interviewed in 2013 concerning a book.

== Personal life ==
In 1952, Clemons married Cecil B. Russell, daughter of Major Walter B. Russell. In late 1973, Clemons passed the State of Hawaii examination for real estate salesman or broker.

Clemons died on May 15, 2018, in Hendersonville, North Carolina, of complications from pneumonia at the age of 90.
