= Richard Russell Sr. =

American judge

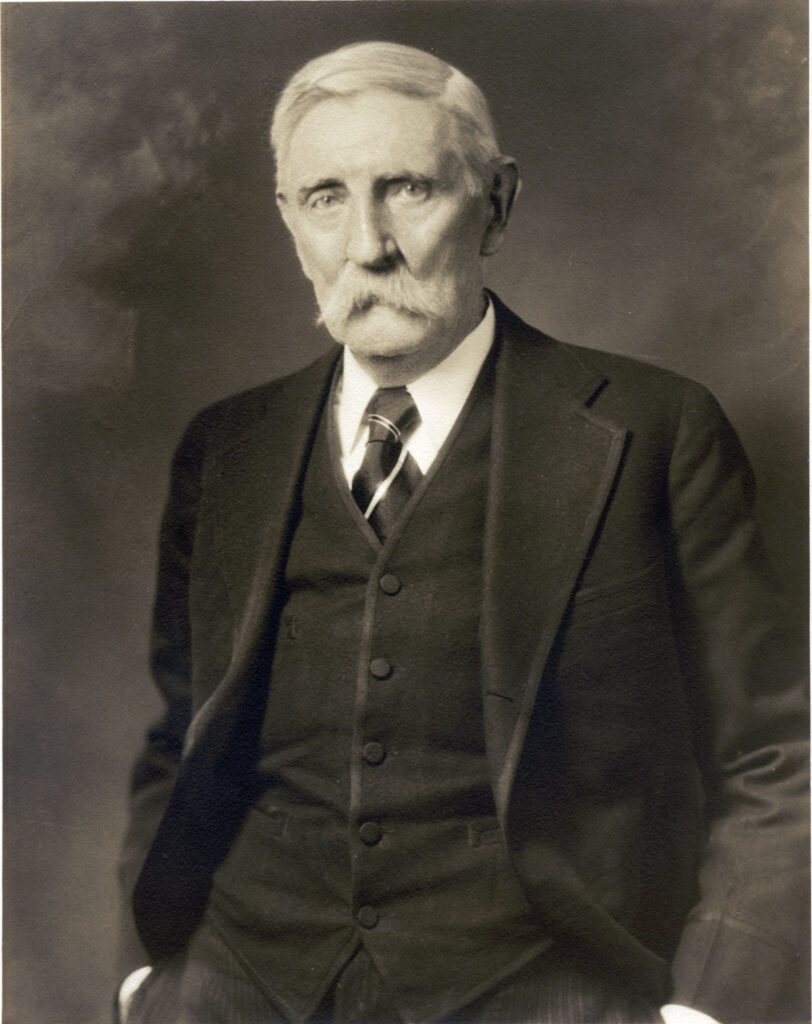

Chief Justice of the Supreme Court of Georgia
- In office 1923–1938
- Preceded by: William H. Fish
- Succeeded by: Charles S. Reid

Personal details
- Born: Richard Brevard Russell; April 27, 1861 Marietta, Georgia, U.S.
- Died: December 3, 1938 (aged 77) Winder, Georgia
- Cause of death: Heart attack
- Spouses: Marie Louise Tyler (m. 1883; died 1885) Ina Dillard (m. 1891)
- Children: 15, including Richard Jr., Robert, and Alexander
- Relatives: Russell family

Richard Brevard Russell Sr. (April 27, 1861 – December 3, 1938) was an American lawyer, legislator, jurist, and candidate for political office. He is the patriarch of the Russell Family of Georgia, a notable 20th century Georgia political family.

== Early life, education and family ==
Russell was born in Marietta, Georgia, in 1861. He attended the University of Georgia (UGA) in Athens, Georgia, and graduated in 1879 with a Bachelor of Arts degree at the age of eighteen and with a Bachelor of Laws degree from the UGA School of Law the following year. While at UGA he was a member of the school's Supreme Court and the Phi Kappa Literary Society, of which he served as president in the spring of 1879.

Russell's first wife was Marie Louise Tyler, whom he married in 1883. However, Marie died two years later due to complications from childbirth.

In 1891, Russell wed a second time to Ina Dillard of Oglethorpe County, Georgia. The couple moved to Winder, Georgia, in 1894 and then further east in 1902 to an area that would become eventually be designated by the Georgia General Assembly as Russell, Georgia. The Russell family home in that community is now on the National Register of Historic Places.

Richard and Ina had fifteen children, thirteen of whom reached adulthood. Their oldest son, Richard Russell Jr., was a governor of Georgia and a long-serving and powerful member of the United States Senate. Their second son, Robert Lee Russell, served as a judge on the United States Court of Appeals for the Fifth Circuit.

== Public service ==
In 1882 at the age of twenty-one, Russell was elected to the Georgia House of Representatives as a representative of Clarke County, Georgia, making him the youngest member of the 180-person chamber. He would serve three two-year terms. During his first two terms Russell led the effort to fund the creation of Georgia's first technical school, which was chartered in 1885 as the Georgia Institute of Technology in Atlanta. In his third term, Russell wrote the first bill proposing the creation of a state-funded women’s college, which passed during the next session and allowed the 1889 charter of the Georgia Normal and Industrial College in Milledgeville (later named Georgia College and State University). Following his third term he declined to run for reelection to the Georgia House, instead winning election to become solicitor general (position renamed to District Attorney in 1968) for the Western Circuit of the Superior Courts of Georgia, a seven-county judicial circuit around his home in Athens, GA. Russell went on to be elected to judicial positions in numerous Georgia courts including the Georgia Court of Appeals (elected in 1907 and Chief Justice of that court from 1913 to 1916) and the Supreme Court of Georgia, where he was elected to the court as Chief Justice and served all sixteen-years in that capacity (1922 to 1938).

Russell maintained an interest in education throughout his life. Alongside his education reforms in the Georgia House of Representatives, Russell was a trustee of the University of Georgia from 1887 to 1889 and from 1913 to 1933, serving as chairman of the trustee board for the last ten years of his tenure. In 1916 he was appointed to the board of Georgia College and State University, and went on to serve as president of that board as well from 1918 to 1933. When Russell's son, Governor Richard B. Russell Jr, signed the State Reorganization Act into law on August 28, 1931, and founded the Board of Regents of the University System of Georgia, the Governor appointed his father to be on the first board of regents of the University System of Georgia, organized on January 1, 1932. Russell would serve in this role until July 1, 1933.

Russell ran in 17 campaigns over his life, the first in 1882 at the age of 21 and the last in 1934 at the age of 72. While Russell had electoral success in the General Assembly and in the Judiciary, he failed repeatedly in his gubernatorial and federal pursuits, losing two Georgia gubernatorial elections (1906 and 1910), a U.S. House of Representatives election (1916), and a U.S. Senate election (1926).

== Fraternal orders ==
Russell was fond of involvement in fraternal benefit societies, especially the Royal Arcanum. He held a number of offices in the groups; provided legal services for them, and was frequently elected as a delegate to their conventions where he'd take Ina and one or more of his children with him on these expenses-paid trips. This involvement would wane after he went into legal practice in later years.

== Death ==
Richard B. Russell Sr. died in 1938 of a heart attack at his home in Winder. He is interred on the highest point of the property, in what is now the Russell Family Cemetery.

== Sources ==
- Master of the Senate: The Years of Lyndon Johnson, 2002, Robert A. Caro, pp. 165–167,204 ISBN 978-0-394-72095-1
- New Georgia Encyclopedia entry for Richard B. Russell Sr.
- History of the University of Georgia by Thomas Walter Reed, Thomas Walter Reed, Imprint: Athens, Georgia : University of Georgia, ca. 1949, pp. 1130-1135

Preceded by William H. Fish	Chief Justice of the Supreme Court of Georgia; 1923–1938	Succeeded by Charles S. Reid
