= Robert Lee Russell =

American judge (1900–1955)

Judge of the United States Court of Appeals for the Fifth Circuit
- In office October 21, 1949 – January 18, 1955
- Appointed by: Harry S. Truman
- Preceded by: Samuel Hale Sibley
- Succeeded by: John Robert Brown

Chief Judge of the United States District Court for the Northern District of Georgia
- In office 1949
- Preceded by: Office established
- Succeeded by: Maurice Neil Andrews

Judge of the United States District Court for the Northern District of Georgia
- In office August 15, 1940 – October 26, 1949
- Appointed by: Franklin D. Roosevelt
- Preceded by: Seat established by 54 Stat. 219
- Succeeded by: Frank Arthur Hooper

Personal details
- Born: Robert Lee Russell; August 19, 1900 Winder, Georgia, U.S.
- Died: January 18, 1955 (aged 54)
- Spouse: Sybil Nannette Millsaps
- Children: 3, including Robert Jr.
- Parents: Richard Russell Sr.; Ina Dillard Russell
- Relatives: Russell family
- Education: read law

Robert Lee Russell (August 19, 1900 – January 18, 1955) was a United States circuit judge of the United States Court of Appeals for the Fifth Circuit and previously was a United States district judge of the United States District Court for the Northern District of Georgia

== Education and career ==
Born in Winder, Georgia, Russell was the brother of Richard Russell Jr. He was educated in Winder and attended the University of Georgia before leaving to study law in the office of his father, Richard Russell Sr. He was admitted to the bar in 1920 and practiced in Atlanta as a partner in his father's firm from 1920 to 1923. He was his father's secretary and law clerk during the elder Russell's service as Chief Justice of the Supreme Court of Georgia from 1923 to 1928, and then returned to private practice in Winder.

== Federal judicial service ==
Russell was nominated by President Franklin D. Roosevelt on August 5, 1940, to the United States District Court for the Northern District of Georgia, to a new seat authorized by 54 Stat. 219. He was confirmed by the United States Senate on August 8, 1940, and received his commission on August 15, 1940. He served as Chief Judge in 1949. His service terminated on October 26, 1949, due to his elevation to the Fifth Circuit.

Russell was nominated by President Harry S. Truman on October 15, 1949, to a seat on the United States Court of Appeals for the Fifth Circuit vacated by Judge Samuel Hale Sibley. He was confirmed by the Senate on October 19, 1949, and received his commission on October 21, 1949. He died on January 18, 1955, ending his service.

Legal offices
Preceded by Seat established by 54 Stat. 219	Judge of the United States District Court for the Northern District of Georgia; 1940–1949	Succeeded by Frank Arthur Hooper
Preceded by Office established	Chief Judge of the United States District Court for the Northern District of Georgia; 1949	Succeeded by Maurice Neil Andrews
Preceded by Samuel Hale Sibley	Judge of the United States Court of Appeals for the Fifth Circuit; 1949–1955	Succeeded by John Robert Brown
