= Dave McCoy =

American skier and businessman (1915–2020)

- Born: August 24, 1915; El Segundo, California, U.S.
- Died: February 8, 2020 (aged 104); Bishop, California, U.S.
- Occupations: Businessman, skier
- Known for: Founding Mammoth Mountain Ski Area

David McCoy (August 24, 1915 – February 8, 2020) was an American skier, ski coach, and businessman who founded the Mammoth Mountain Ski Area in 1942. He first settled in the Eastern Sierras of the Inyo National Forest as a teenager and later worked as a hydrographer for the Los Angeles Department of Water and Power. His job required him to ski daily to measure snowpack, which allowed him to identify the Mammoth Mountain area as an ideal location for skiing. He began by installing a rope tow on McGee Mountain in 1938. After snowfall patterns changed in the 1940s, he moved his focus to what eventually became Mammoth Mountain. Despite initial rejections, he obtained a permit from the Forest Service in 1953 and opened the first chairlift in 1955. He also had a career in competitive skiing and coaching. He won state slalom titles in 1937 and 1949 and coached several Olympic medalists and national team members including his children Penny McCoy and Dennis McCoy. He was inducted into the U.S. Ski and Snowboard Hall of Fame. He retired in 2005 after selling his stake in the mountain to Starwood Capital Group.

== Early life ==
McCoy was born in El Segundo, California, in August 1915 to Edna and Bill McCoy. He spent the first six years of his life in Southern California where his father worked at the Standard Oil Refinery. His father then began working as a California state highway contractor. Due to the nature of his father's job, he spent time in "tent camps" that followed work opportunities and allowed him to spend time in the rural outdoors of California. He first visited the eastern Sierra Nevada when he was 13, and went on to make his own first pair of skis in a high school shop class. After his parents divorced and finishing the eighth grade, he moved to Washington state to live with his paternal grandparents Bob and Katie Cox in Wilkeson, Washington. He played football, baseball, basketball, and track and field. He graduated from high school. He met some Norwegian skiers in Washington state.

== Ski resort career ==
View of ski area and mountains

After graduating from high school, he moved to the small census-designated place of Independence, California where he worked as a soda jerk and doing odd jobs. He eventually moved a few miles north to Bishop. At age 20, he took a job as a hydrographer for the Los Angeles Department of Water and Power, which involved skiing up to 50 miles per day and measuring snowpack. While working as a hydrographer, he joined the Eastern Sierra Ski Club and began winning ski races.

=== McGee Mountain ===
In 1938, McCoy got a permit and set up a primitive rope tow on McGee Mountain, near US Highway 395, using parts from a Model "A" Ford truck. He went to a bank in Bishop, seeking an $85 loan to set up a permanent rope tow. The bank initially turned him down, but the bank's secretary, his future wife, urged the bank to make the loan. By the early 1940s, the climate changed and the snowfall on McGee was not as heavy as it had once been. It was suddenly not an ideal location for skiing anymore. Remnants of McCoy's original rope-tow can be spotted, and the site is marked with a historical marker sign along the current Highway 395.

=== Mammoth Mountain ===
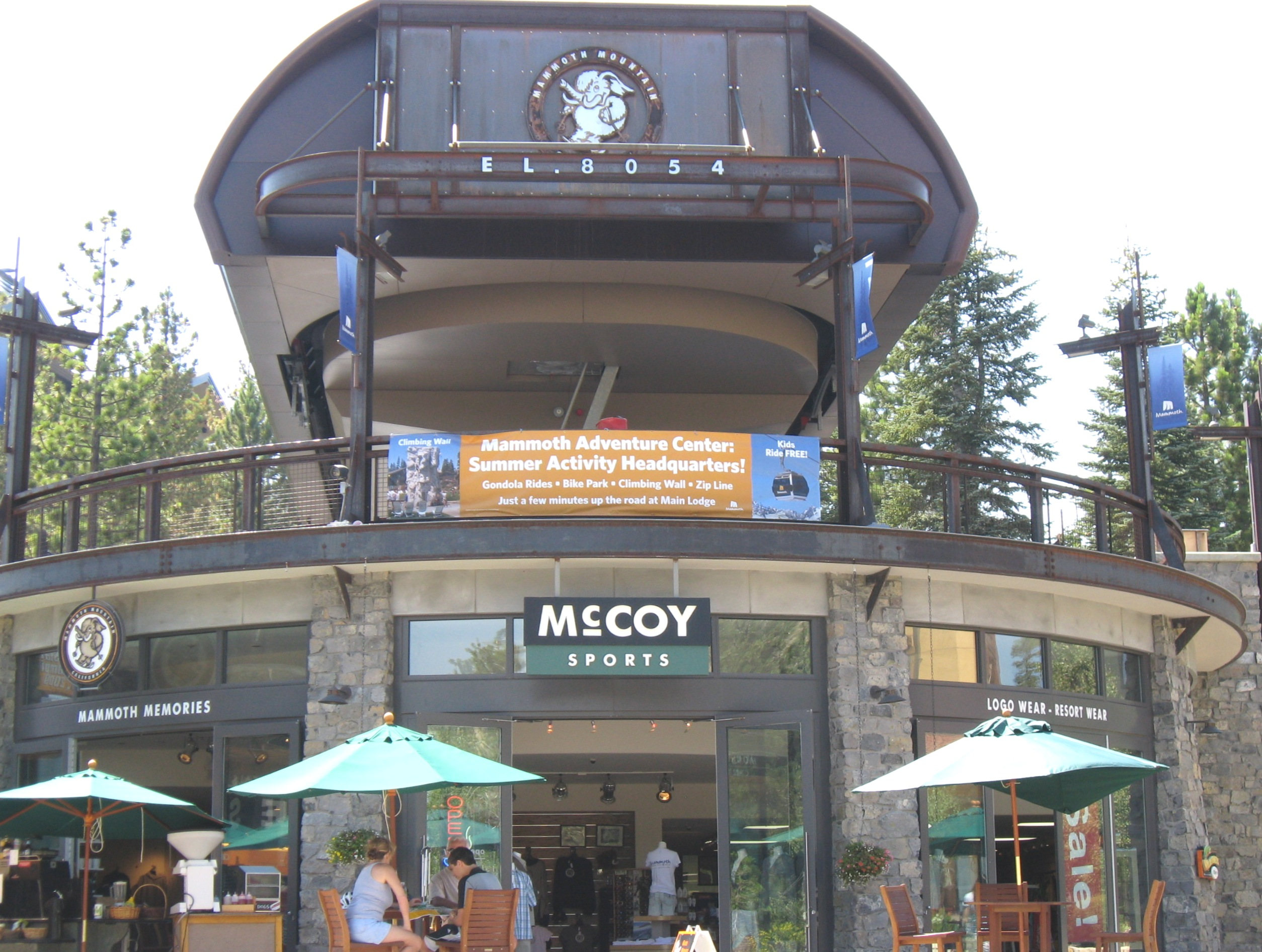
Village at Mammoth (August 2009)

During his work as a hydrographer in the Eastern Sierra, he noticed that the snow was better at Mammoth Mountain ski area, where he set up a rope tow in 1942. The Forest Service decided then to offer, for bid, the right to operate a ski area on Mammoth Mountain. No one bid on this permit, including McCoy, who didn't have any money. In 1953, the Forest Service gave McCoy the permit on the condition that he develop the mountain as a ski resort. A ski lodge followed in 1953, and the Mammoth Mountain Ski Area incorporated in 1955.

McCoy struggled to develop Mammoth at various times. The "lodge" was actually only 12' by 24', had a dirt floor with an outside toilet, and served snacks. The McCoy family used it as a home during the early years of Mammoth. McCoy faced adversity in growing the ski area: drought in 1958–59, the 1973 oil crisis, and only 94" inches of snow during the 1976–1977 season, the worst in Mammoth's history.

McCoy went to the bank again for a loan of $135,000 to build a chair lift. Again, he was turned down. McCoy eventually got a used chairlift. McCoy and a small group of skiers had to dig holes, mix concrete, and install the lift on their own by Thanksgiving 1955. Chair 1 had a wooden ramp, covered with snow, that skiers had to side-step up to reach the chairs. Sometimes skiers would lose their balance and cause several of the skiers in line below to topple over like dominoes. The ramp was removed sometime in 1980s and a new high-speed Chair 1 was installed and renamed "Broadway Express." The original main lodge was expanded and the upper part of the old exterior rock wall mural, with a white and brown flagstone arrow and skier, can be seen to this day.

By 1973, the ski area grew to 14 double-chairs, and a second base lodge originally named Warming Hut II was built. It was renamed Canyon Lodge in the mid-1990s. In February 1986, Mammoth sold 600,000 lift tickets during one of the busiest ski seasons in the United States that year. He purchased June Mountain ski area in 1986. A cafeteria/bar named the Mill Cafe was built by Chair 2 in the early 2000s, and a portable building named Eagle Lodge with clothes, a bar, and snacks on the left side of the mountain was added as well.

The growth of the ski area led to growth of the town of Mammoth Lakes, California, which incorporated in 1984. In the 1990s, Alpha Airlines briefly flew from Los Angeles to the small Mammoth Airport along Highway 395. In the first decade of the 2000s, Horizon Airlines, began to offer seasonal service from Los Angeles, Reno, and the San Francisco Bay Area to Mammoth. McCoy bought a small airline to fly a few skiers from Burbank, California to Mammoth.

In 2005, McCoy announced that he was retiring after running the ski area for 68 years. Mammoth Mountain Ski Area was sold to Starwood Capital Group in a deal that valued Mammoth at $365 million, significantly more than the $135,000 he borrowed in 1953 to build the first lift.

== Ski racing and coaching ==
McCoy won the California State Slalom Championship in 1937 at age 22. He served as the coach for the Bishop High School ski team. A crash when he was traveling at 60 mph during a downhill race at Sugar Bowl in 1942 caused a severe fracture to his left femur and nearly led to the amputation of his leg. He was on crutches for years, underwent surgeries, and dedicated years to his recovery. McCoy returned to competitive skiing and won the California State Slalom title in 1949. He went on to coach several notable skiers including his own children Penny McCoy and Dennis McCoy (alpine skier). He coached Jill Kinmont Boothe in the 1950s. He coached Linda Meyers. Jean Saubert, who won medals at the 1964 Winter Olympics, said McCoy was her best coach.

== Legacy ==
Signs for Mammoth Mountain and Dave's Run at top of Mammoth Mountain Ski Area

In 2000, the mid-chalet station of Mammoth's gondola was renamed McCoy Station in his honor. In November 2024, a 10-mile section of U.S. Route 395 near Mammoth was designated the Dave McCoy Memorial Highway by California. Caltrans put two signs that label the highway between Convict Lake Road and State Route 203 after McCoy. There is a ski run called "Dave's Run" at the top of the mountain.

=== Awards and Recognition ===
- U.S. Ski & Snowboard’s John J. Clair Jr. Award (1994) for "outstanding service which benefited the U.S. Ski or Snowboard Teams."
- National Ski Areas Association Lifetime Achievement Award (1999)
- Far West Ski Association - Hans Georg Award with Mammoth Mountain (1974) for "distinguished accomplishment and long-term contribution to skiing"
- U.S. Ski & Snowboard - Paul Bacon Award (1971) and shared with Fraser West for "individual or group for the greatest contribution to U. S. Ski & Snowboard in the field of race organization."
- U.S. Ski and Snowboard Hall of Fame (Class of 1967)
- U.S. Ski & Snowboard - Russell Wilder Award (1963) recognizing "outstanding effort in focusing the interests of American youth on the sports of skiing or snowboarding"

== Personal life ==
He married Roma Carriere in 1941 and the family settled in Bishop.

As of 2018, Dave and Roma McCoy had 6 children, 17 grandchildren, 28 great-grandchildren, and 1 great-great-grandchild, a total of 52 descendants. He continued to ski until 2008, but stopped due to a knee replacement and his age. McCoy took up photography as well. McCoy turned 100 on August 24, 2015 and died on February 8, 2020, at his home in the eastern Sierra Nevada community of Bishop, California at the age of 104. Roma McCoy died in April 2021.

== Media portrayals ==
He was portrayed by Dabney Coleman in the 1975 film The Other Side of the Mountain. Mammoth Dreams is a documentary film about McCoy.

In 2021 Robin Morning published For the Love of It: The Mammoth Legacy of Roma and Dave McCoy. The book traces the lives of McCoy and his wife from their childhoods through the development and opening of Mammoth. She also wrote Tracks of Passion about McCoy.
