= Sugar Bowl Ski Resort =

Ski area in California, United States

Sugar Bowl Resort
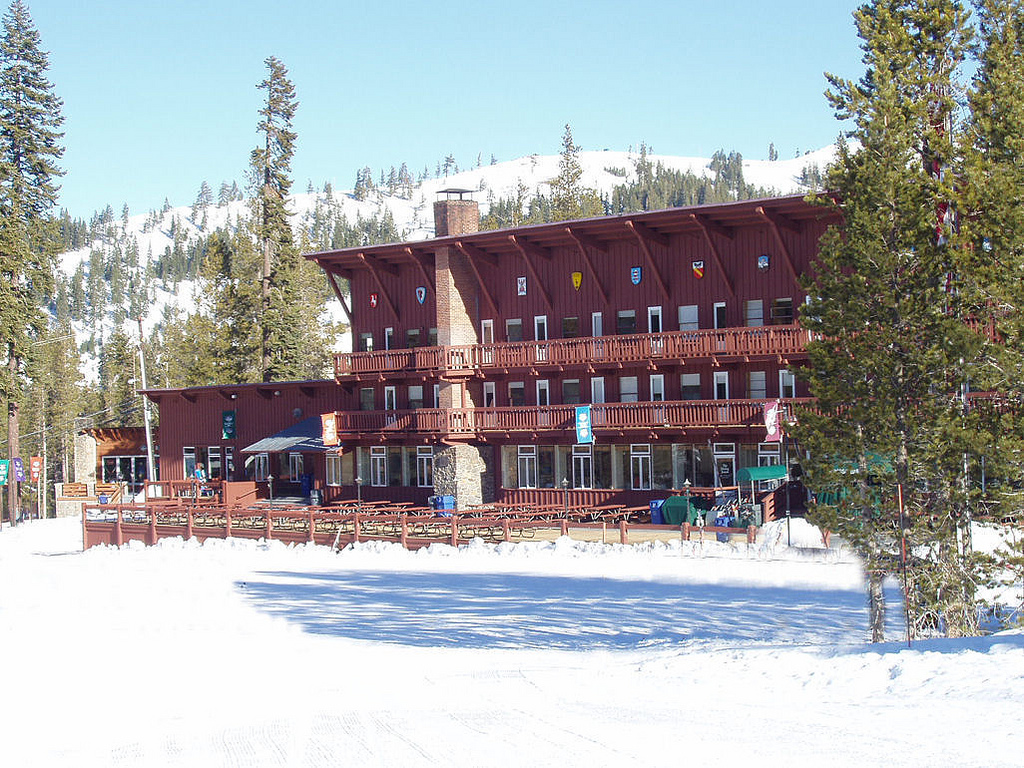

- Location in California Sugar Bowl Resort (the United States)
- Location: 629 Sugar Bowl Rd, Norden, CA 95724
- Nearest city: Norden, California
- Coordinates: 39.30444°N 120.33583°W
- Top elevation: 8,383 ft (2,555 m)
- Base elevation: 6,883 ft (2,098 m)
- Skiable area: 1,650 acres (670 ha)
- Trails: 103 total 17% beginner 45% intermediate 38% advanced
- Longest run: 3 mi (4.8 km)
- Lift system: 13 lifts (5 high speed quads, 3 quads, 1 triple chair, 1 gondola, 3 surface lifts
- Lift capacity: 21,740 passengers/hr
- Snowfall: 500 in (1,300 cm)
- Website: www.sugarbowl.com

Sugar Bowl is a ski and snowboard area in northern Placer County near Norden, California along the Donner Pass of the Sierra Nevada, approximately 46 mi (74 km) west of Reno, Nevada on Interstate 80, that opened on December 15, 1939. Sugar Bowl is a medium-sized ski area in the Lake Tahoe region, and is well known for its long history, significant advanced terrain, high annual snowfall and being one of the closest ski areas to the San Francisco Bay Area. Sugar Bowl's terrain is 17% Beginner, 45% Intermediate and 38% Advanced.

Sugar Bowl was founded by Hannes Schroll and a group of individual investors and is one of the few remaining privately owned resorts in the Lake Tahoe area. Sugar Bowl was the first ski area in California to install a chairlift and the first on the west coast to install a gondola lift.

== History ==
=== Site real estate ===
The mountain peaks of Mt. Judah and Mt. Lincoln, which eventually became the ski slopes of the Sugar Bowl ski resort, were a part of the American pioneers route, back in the 1800s. A part of the California wagon trail called Roller Pass ran between Mt. Judah and Mt. Lincoln. It was one of the wagon trails through Donner Pass that was used by settlers and prospectors, on the Emigrant Trail, coming from the eastern United States across the Sierra Nevada. Today the same pass can be reached by way of the Pacific Crest Trail or a new trail created by Sugar Bowl ski resort, in 1994, called the Mt. Judah Loop trail.

The Central Pacific Railroad first began train services to Donner Pass in 1868 after the completion of the First transcontinental railroad across the United States. A new tunnel constructed two-miles (3 km) through virtually solid granite, dubbed The Big Hole tunnel, was later constructed through Mt. Judah in 1925, offering trains better protection from snow storms on the summit. These heavy snow storms and blizzards during the winters often made even train service difficult over the years through the pass, which for a period of time was known as the Overland Route.

Historian Charles F. McGlashan believed the area's economy would greatly benefit by hosting a winter carnival, and in 1894 he built the first hand-crafted Ice Palace to draw in tourists from the passenger trains. Soon after, the railroad began running "Snowball Specials" to Truckee from the Oakland Pier.

The area became more accessible to tourists in 1913 when the Lincoln Highway, the first road across the United States opened over the Donner Pass. This road was later upgraded in 1926 to U.S. Route 40, although snow plowing operations by the state of California didn't start until 1932, making travel to the area by car difficult in the winter. In 1924 Charlie Chaplin filmed scenes upon Mt. Lincoln for his silent movie classic The Gold Rush. Six hundred men were brought in by train from Sacramento to serve as extras for the comedy scene.

The land that Sugar Bowl ski resort is built on was originally purchased in 1923 by Stephen and Jennie Pilcher. They paid $10.00 for 700 acres (2.8 km^{2}) to the Southern Pacific Railroad, who by then had taken over for the Central Pacific Railroad by lease and acquired its operations by 1885. During the early 1930s, before Sugar Bowl installed the first chair lift, skiers who wanted to ski the Donner Pass mountain peaks, like Mt. Lincoln, would have to climb up to the peaks on foot in order to get the chance to ski. By the mid thirties there were several rope tows dotting the hill sides of the Donner Pass area.

In 1936, Austrian ski instructors Bill and Fred Klein opened the Klein ski school, serving the Sierra Club out of the Clair Tappaan Lodge in the area and local skiers from Sacramento and San Francisco. The Klein brothers and a few other instructors they had taught, were often teaching 100 to 150 students a weekend, taking the more advanced students up to the crest of Mt. Lincoln on foot. This was partly attributed to the fact that new skiers were just venturing into the mountains more and with an improved Highway made travel easier. The term "leisure" was beginning to take hold in America during this time, after the passage of the Wagner Act and other labor laws of the 1930s. There was also an interest in skiing that can be attributed to the 1932 Winter Olympics the first to be held in the US, held in Lake Placid, New York.

=== Sugar Bowl ===
The following year in 1937, the 700 acres (2.8 km^{2}) around Mt. Lincoln and Hemlock Peak were put up for sale by the daughters of the Pilchers. Bill Klein contacted Hannes Schroll, a famous Austrian skiing champion and ski instructor he personally knew, who was working at Yosemite at the time, about the sale of the land. Schroll, a colorful character who would always be found yodeling when he would ski, visited the area. When he and Klein saw the steep boulder field sloping down towards Donner Lake, they could not believe that it would all be covered in snow by winter. By March 1938 Schroll had made a deal with the Pilcher sisters for the purchase of the land for $6,740. But when Schroll tried to retrieve funds from his home in Austria, the war had just broken out and his funds had been taken. Schroll then had to borrow the funding to buy the property from Hamilton McCaughey, a local realtor, and ice-skating champion George Stiles. Schroll had also sent a wire via Western Union to Walt Disney while seeking funding to purchase the property, but Disney was out of town and did not receive the wire in time. Schroll then became president of the Sugar Bowl Corporation in 1938 with the help and support of Wellington Henderson, Sherman Chickering, and Donald Gregory. Shortly after, Schroll began seeking other investors to help build a Slope side Tyrolean style village and ski resort modeled after those in his hometown of Kitzbühel, Austria. Because they thought the fine, crystalline snow looked like sugar, Schroll and Klein decided on the name "Sugar Bowl" for the resort.

The Southern Pacific Railroad agreed to build a facility adjacent to the Norden telegraph office to accommodate 600 people, to support the opening of Sugar Bowl. Walt Disney, who had taken ski lessons from Schroll at Yosemite was approached again for funding and became a shareholder when he gave Schroll $2,500. Schroll then changed the name of "Hemlock Peak" to "Mt. Disney" to honor Disney's support. Soon after, others followed suit, and Schroll was able to raise $75,000 by June 1939 to help start and build the resort. Schroll also used his connections from Hollywood to convince Metro-Goldwyn-Mayer to produce a film called "Snowbirds" during November 1938, before Sugar Bowl opened to the public.

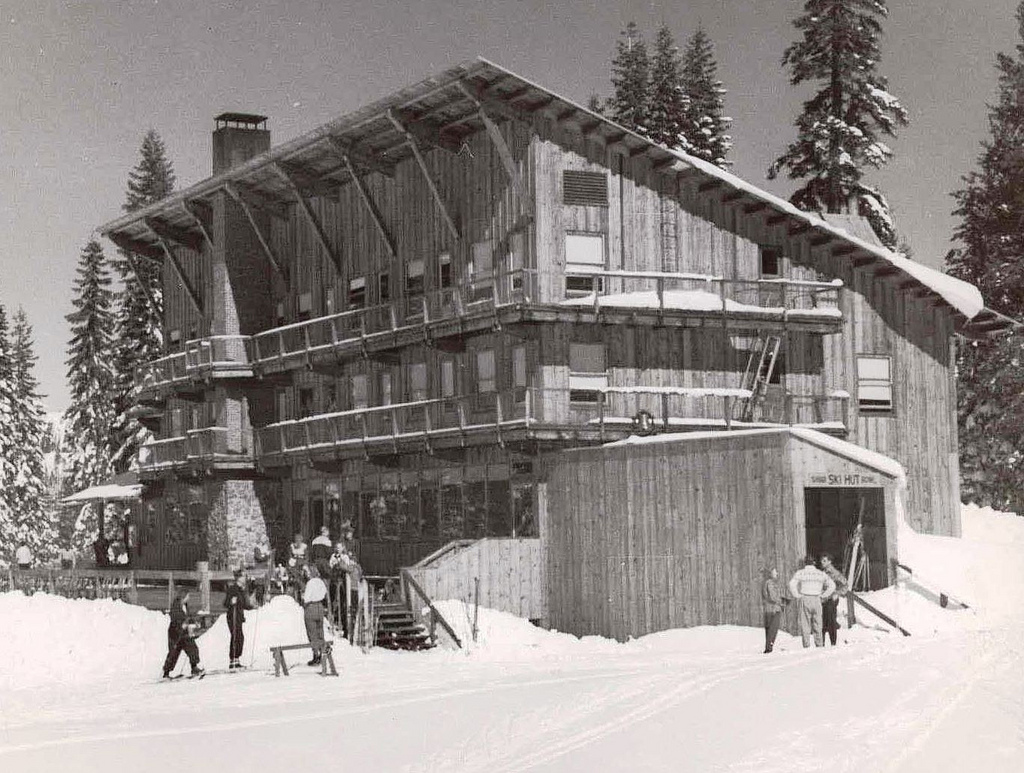
The Sugar Bowl Lodge shortly after it was built in 1939

Construction of the Sugar Bowl lodge and the first chairlift began during the summer of 1939. The lodge was designed by William Wurster and was erected with a sloping roof so that snow would slide off towards the back side. The chairlift was designed by Henry Howard and built by the Riblet Tramway Company. Moore Dry Dock Company was hired to install the 13 towers in Howard's design to span the 1,000 vertical feet up to the top of Mt. Disney. Miners were brought in from Nevada City and used shovels, picks, and sometimes dynamite to clear away trees and dig footings for the towers by hand. Lava formation in the mountain was encountered during construction and some of the footings had to be set within it. Sugar Bowl opened on December 15, 1939, but it hadn't snowed enough to open the mountain for skiing, so a makeshift ice rink the size of a tennis court was quickly set up for everyone to enjoy. Two weeks later on January 4, 1940, a blizzard struck Sugar Bowl, and skiers began pouring in.

==== After opening ====
Towards the end of the very first ski season at Sugar Bowl, Schroll held the inaugural Silver Belt race in April 1940. The race was won by Gretchen Fraser and Friedl Pfeifer. Prior to the international World Cup ski competition, the Silver Belt race was considered one of the most challenging of that era and often attracted the top European and American skiers. Jannette Burr and Christian Pravda were the only competitors to win the race three different times. Other notable winners included Alf Engen, Tom Corcoran, Buddy Werner, Willy Favre, Jean Saubert, Barbara Cochran, Jack Reddish, Penny Pitou, Anne Heggtveit, Dick Buek, Jill Kinmont, Andrea Mead Lawrence, Gordon Wren and Cynthia Nelson, who won the last event in 1975.

Because Sugar Bowl had the first chair lift in the Sierras with full lodge accommodations, the resort quickly became a popular skiing destination for many notable guests and Hollywood personalities. Storytelling, dancing on the open deck, and wearing suit jackets to dinner was the norm during this colorful time. Guests included King Vidor, Robert Stack, Norma Shearer, Margaret Sullavan, Jean Arthur, James Bryant Conant, Doris Duke, Claudette Colbert, Lowell Thomas, Leland Hayward, Errol Flynn, Sterling Hayden, and Marilyn Monroe. Robert Stack, who grew up in Lake Tahoe, could often be found skiing with Schroll. Actress Janet Leigh was even discovered at Sugar Bowl ski resort by actress Norma Shearer. Leigh's father, Fred Morrison, was a front desk clerk and had his daughter's photo visible when the actress checked in at the lodge. After seeing the photograph, Shearer brought Leigh into contact with MGM. The movie Two-Faced Woman, starring Greta Garbo, Melvyn Douglas, Constance Bennett, Roland Young, and Ruth Gordon, was filmed at Sugar Bowl in the spring of 1941. Sugar Bowl was also featured in the 1941 Disney cartoon The Art of Skiing. Schroll is credited with the yodel that Goofy makes in the cartoon, later known as the Goofy holler.

Operations to a temporary halt when the US became involved in World War II. The resort had few guests and Schroll retired as president of Sugar Bowl in 1945. Gone, too, were the "Snowball Specials", a Southern Pacific Railroad service to Donner Pass.

==== After the war ====
Klein returned to Sugar Bowl in 1946 as Sugar Bowl's ski school director and held the position until 1957. Klein believed skiing was a fashionable sport and started his own ski shop, out of the Sugar Bowl lodge. Howard Head, who invented the first metal skis, asked Klein to test his new laminate skis he was developing at the time and then offered Klein a one-fourth interest in his ski company. Klein declined the offer at the time and remained at Sugar Bowl, but later said he regretted the decision, after Head's company became one of the leading ski manufacturers in the U.S.

A second chairlift was installed at Sugar Bowl in 1950. The new double-chair lift made new terrain on Mt. Lincoln accessible to skiers without hiking. Two years later in 1952, the original ski lift going up Mt. Disney was replaced.

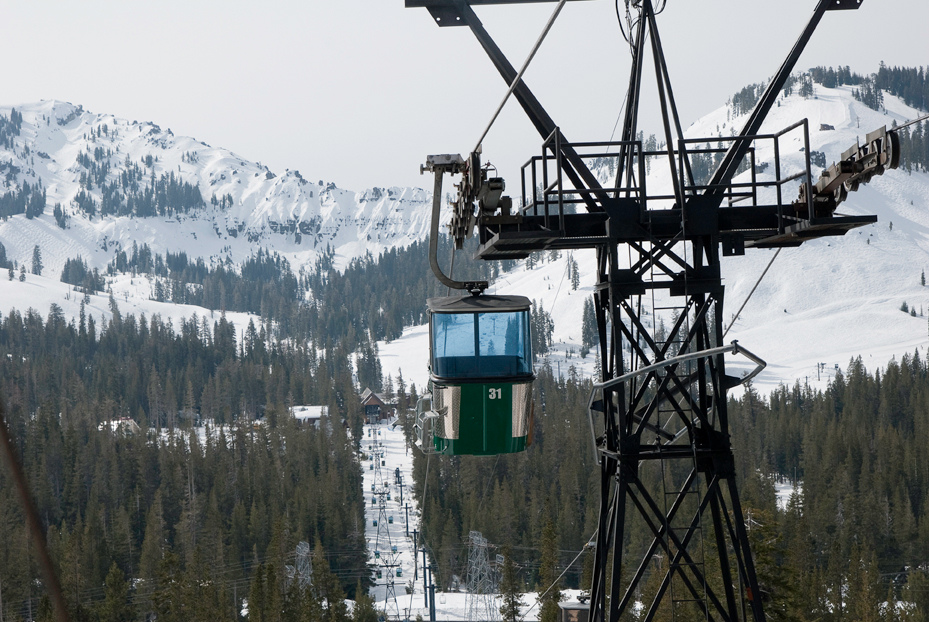
The Sugar Bowl Gondola that takes Guest to the Lodge & Ski area

Based on the original design plans of Sugar Bowl, Jerome Hill determined that a gondola would be necessary to move people better into the ski area. In 1953 Heron of Denver installed "The Magic Carpet", the first aerial tramway on the west coast. The Gondola has been rebuilt and upgraded twice since the original installation. It brings guests from a parking lot on the north side of the railroad line, crosses over the tracks just past the west portal of Tunnel No. 41, and deposits people in the main village.

The 1960s ushered in new era of skiing in the Sierra Nevada after the 1960 Winter Olympics were held in nearby Squaw Valley. Disney directed the Pageantry for the games, which today are better known as the Opening and Closing Ceremonies.

Skiing was becoming more popular and better, with over 3 million skiers hitting the slopes each year and improved equipment entering the market. Filmmaker Warren Miller came to Sugar Bowl in 1963 to shoot scenes for his film "The Color Of Skiing", Junior Bounous the ski school director at Sugar Bowl in 1958 and the first American-born ski school director in the US, was also featured in over 10 Warren Miller films. Bounous would later go on to be inducted into the U.S. National Ski and Snowboard Hall of Fame in 1996.

By 1964, Interstate 80 was constructed over the crest of Donner Pass to replace the older Historic U.S. 40, which today is named Donner Pass Road.

=== Recent history ===
Sugar Bowl is one of the oldest and longest running ski resorts on the west coast, having been in operation for over 70 years. During the last several decades Sugar Bowl ski resort has replaced its older double chair lifts and added new quad lifts to open up new trails on its 4 mountain peaks, Mt. Judah, Mt. Lincoln, Mt. Disney and the Crows Nest Peak. A 10-year expansion of the resort began in 1992, with addition of a new parking lot and a lodge at the base of Mt. Judah, a pedestrian village and more off-slope facilities.

Another addition came in 1999 with the founding of the Sugar Bowl Academy (SBA), a college preparatory high school for competitive skiers. The School Academy was co-founded by Jim Hudson, Barbara Sorba and Dr. Patricia "Tricia" Hellman Gibbs, former member of the U.S. Ski Team and daughter of Warren Hellman. SBA recently celebrated its 20th anniversary. The most notable alumni graduates from the ski academy have been Katie Hitchcock, Luke Winters and Hannah Halvorsen who have been members of the U.S. Ski Team.

A new ski race was added at Sugar Bowl in 2004, modeled after the Silver Belt races of the past that descends down the same slopes of Mt. Lincoln, called the Silver Belt Banzai. The race differs from the traditional Silver Belt races that were held during the 1940s, in that 4 to 6 skiers or snowboarders race down the hill at the same time, known as a skier cross-style format. 2010 Vancouver Olympic Games competitor Daron Rahlves and his sister Shannon, both won the event back to back in 2009 and 2010 for the men and women.

== Ski trails ==
Mt. Judah is named after Theodore Judah who was the railroad design engineer for the Central Pacific Railroad, who surveyed and planned the route that the rail road tracks follow through Donner Pass to Nevada. Mt. Disney is named in honor of Walt Disney, an initial stockholder when Sugar Bowl was being constructed.

Bill Klein’s Schuss is a moderately steep blue square towards the bottom of Mt. Lincoln, named in honor of Bill Klein, once the ski school director and ski shop owner at Sugar Bowl ski resort. He went on the initial trip with Schroll in 1937 to look at the land and mountain peaks that would one day become the Sugar Bowl ski resort.

Jerome Hill is named after Sugar Bowl stockholder Jerome E. Hill, who was responsible for paying for and installing "The Magic Carpet" gondola at Sugar Bowl ski resort.

In addition, many of the trails and locations on the mountain are named after streets and landmarks in San Francisco, such as Nob Hill, Market Street, and Montgomery.

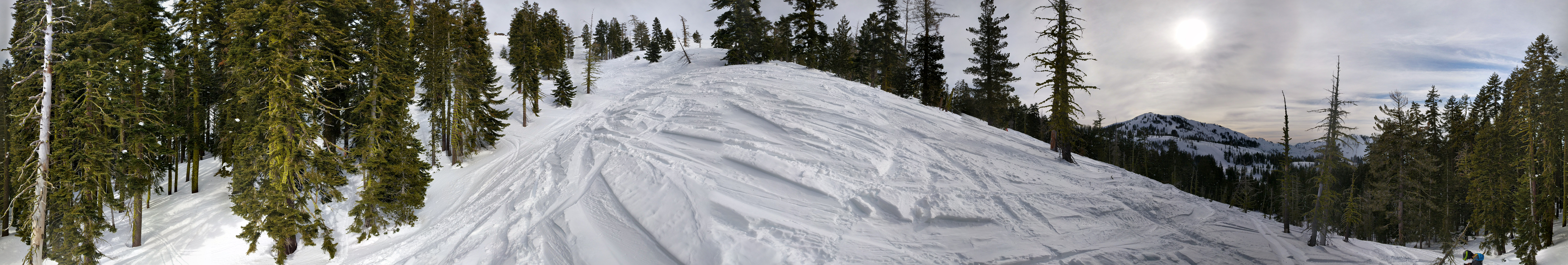
Panorama taken off-trail near Century Club or Roller Pass

== In popular culture ==
In the 1941 Goofy cartoon The Art of Skiing, Goofy skis at Sugar Bowl.
