= The Stranger Who Looks Like Me =

- Genre: Drama; Romance
- Written by: Gerald Di Pego
- Directed by: Larry Peerce
- Starring: Meredith Baxter; Beau Bridges; Walter Brooke
- Music by: George Tipton; Paul Williams
- Country of origin: United States
- Original language: English

Production
- Executive producer: Edward S. Feldman
- Producer: Lillian Gallo
- Cinematography: Mario Tosi
- Editor: Eve Newman
- Running time: 74 minutes
- Production company: Filmways Television

Original release
- Network: ABC
- Release: March 6, 1974

The Stranger Who Looks Like Me is a 1974 American made-for-television drama romance film directed by Larry Peerce and starring Meredith Baxter, Beau Bridges and Walter Brooke. The cast includes Whitney Blake (Meredith Baxter's real-life mother); Bill Vint, who starred in the drive-in classic Macon County Line, as well as future Dallas star Patrick Duffy, who has a small part. The film originally premiered as the ABC Movie of the Week on March 6, 1974.

== Plot ==
Joanne Denver was adopted at birth and is searching for her birth parents. She meets Chris Schroeder, who is also adopted and is searching for his birth parents.

== Cast ==
- Meredith Baxter as Joanne Denver
- Beau Bridges as Chris Schroeder
- Walter Brooke as Mr. Denver
- Neva Patterson as Mrs. Denver
- Whitney Blake as Emma Verko
- Woody Chambliss as Paul (as Woodrow Chambliss)
- Ford Rainey as Mr. Gilbert
- Maxine Stuart as Mrs. Weiner
- Patricia Harty as Carol Sutton
- Mary Murphy as Mrs. Quayle
- Bill Vint as Bob
- Anne Barton as Mrs. Carter
- Warren Miller as Mike Sutton
- Linda Morrow as Gloria
- Victor Bevine as Gary
- Cecil Elliott as Gramma Dupre (as Cecil Elliot)
- Jan Arvan as Uncle Charles
- Biff Elliot as Charles Verko (as Biff Elliott)
- Tom Moses as Clerk
- Sylvia Walden as Adoptive Parent #1
- Millie Slavin as Adoptive Parent #2
- Hampton Fancher as Adoptive Parent #3
- Jocelyn Jones as Adoptee #1
- Susan Adams as Adoptee #2
- Patrick Duffy as Adoptee #3
- Warren Seabury as Adoptee #4
