= 33rd Golden Globe Awards =

Film award ceremony in 1976

- Date: January 24, 1976

Highlights
- Best Film: Drama: One Flew Over the Cuckoo's Nest
- Best Film: Musical or Comedy: The Sunshine Boys

The 33rd Golden Globe Awards, honoring the best in film and television for 1975, were held on January 24, 1976. Nashville received 11 nominations; the most for a single film. As of 2025, the film still holds that record.

== Winners and nominees ==
=== Film ===
Best Motion Picture
Drama	Comedy or Musical
One Flew Over the Cuckoo's Nest; Barry Lyndon; Dog Day Afternoon; Jaws; Nashville	The Sunshine Boys; Funny Lady; The Return of the Pink Panther; Shampoo; Tommy
Best Performance in a Motion Picture – Drama
Actor	Actress
Jack Nicholson — One Flew Over the Cuckoo's Nest as Randle McMurphy; Gene Hackman — French Connection II as Det. Jimmy "Popeye" Doyle; Al Pacino — Dog Day Afternoon as Sonny Wortzik; Maximilian Schell — The Man in the Glass Booth as Arthur Goldman; James Whitmore — Give 'em Hell, Harry! as Harry S. Truman	Louise Fletcher — One Flew Over the Cuckoo's Nest as Nurse Ratched; Karen Black — The Day of the Locust as Faye Greener; Faye Dunaway — Three Days of the Condor as Kathy Hale; Marilyn Hassett — The Other Side of the Mountain as Jill Kinmont; Glenda Jackson — Hedda as Hedda Gabler
Best Performance in a Motion Picture – Comedy or Musical
Actor	Actress
George Burns — The Sunshine Boys as Al Lewis; Walter Matthau — The Sunshine Boys as Willy Clark; Warren Beatty — Shampoo as George Roundy; James Caan — Funny Lady as Billy Rose; Peter Sellers — The Return of the Pink Panther as Inspector Jacques Clouseau	Ann-Margret — Tommy as Nora Walker; Julie Christie — Shampoo as Jackie Shawn; Goldie Hawn — Shampoo as Jill; Liza Minnelli — Lucky Lady as Claire; Barbra Streisand — Funny Lady as Fanny Brice
Best Supporting Performance in a Motion Picture – Drama, Comedy or Musical
Supporting Actor	Supporting Actress
Richard Benjamin — The Sunshine Boys as Ben Clark; John Cazale — Dog Day Afternoon as Sal; Charles Durning — Dog Day Afternoon as Eugene Moretti; Henry Gibson — Nashville as Haven Hamilton; Burgess Meredith — The Day of the Locust as Harry Greener	Brenda Vaccaro — Jacqueline Susann's Once Is Not Enough as Linda Riggs; Ronee Blakley — Nashville as Barbara Jean; Geraldine Chaplin — Nashville as Opal; Lee Grant — Shampoo as Felicia Karpf; Barbara Harris — Nashville as Albuquerque; Lily Tomlin — Nashville as Linnea Reese
Other
Best Director	Best Screenplay
Miloš Forman — One Flew Over the Cuckoo's Nest; Robert Altman — Nashville; Stanley Kubrick — Barry Lyndon; Sidney Lumet — Dog Day Afternoon; Steven Spielberg — Jaws	One Flew Over the Cuckoo's Nest — Bo Goldman and Lawrence Hauben; Dog Day Afternoon — Frank Pierson; Jaws — Peter Benchley and Carl Gottlieb; Nashville — Joan Tewkesbury; The Sunshine Boys — Neil Simon
Best Original Score	Best Original Song
Jaws — John Williams; Funny Lady — Fred Ebb and John Kander; The Man Who Would Be King — Maurice Jarre; The Other Side of the Mountain — Charles Fox; The Return of the Pink Panther — Henry Mancini	"I'm Easy" (Keith Carradine) – Nashville; "How Lucky Can You Get" (John Kander, Fred Ebb) – Funny Lady; "My Little Friend" (Roy Budd, Sammy Cahn) – Paper Tiger; "Now That We're in Love" (George Barrie, Sammy Cahn) – Whiffs; "Richard's Window" (Charles Fox, Norman Gimbel) – The Other Side of the Mountain
Best Foreign Film	Best Documentary Film
Lies My Father Told Me (Canada); And Now My Love (France); Hedda (United Kingdom); The Magic Flute (Sweden); Section spéciale (France)	Youthquake!; Brother, Can You Spare a Dime?; The Gentleman Tramp; Mustang: The House That Joe Built; The Other Half of the Sky: A China Memoir; UFOs: Past, Present, and Future
New Star of the Year – Actor	New Star of the Year – Actress
Brad Dourif — One Flew Over the Cuckoo's Nest as Billy Bibbit; Roger Daltrey — Tommy as Tommy Walker; Jeffrey Lynas — Lies My Father Told Me as David Herman; Chris Sarandon — Dog Day Afternoon as Leon Shermer; Ben Vereen — Funny Lady as Bert Robbins	Marilyn Hassett — The Other Side of the Mountain as Jill Kinmont; Ronee Blakley — Nashville as Barbara Jean; Barbara Carrera — The Master Gunfighter as Eula; Stockard Channing — The Fortune as Fredrika Quintessa Bigard; Jeannette Clift — The Hiding Place as Corrie ten Boom; Lily Tomlin — Nashville as Linnea Reese

The following films received multiple nominations:

Nominations	Title
11	Nashville
7	Dog Day Afternoon
6	Funny Lady
6	One Flew Over the Cuckoo's Nest
5	Shampoo
5	The Sunshine Boys
4	Jaws
4	The Other Side of the Mountain
3	The Return of the Pink Panther
3	Tommy
2	Barry Lyndon
2	The Day of the Locust
2	Hedda
2	Lies My Father Told Me

The following films received multiple wins:

Wins	Title
6	One Flew Over the Cuckoo's Nest
4	The Sunshine Boys

=== Television ===
Best Television Series
Drama	Musical or Comedy
Kojak: Baretta; Columbo; Petrocelli; Police Story	Barney Miller: All in the Family; The Carol Burnett Show; Chico and the Man; The Mary Tyler Moore Show
Best Performance in a Television Series Drama
Actor	Actress
Robert Blake - Baretta as Tony Baretta (TIE) Telly Savalas - Kojak as Lt. Theo Kojak (TIE): Peter Falk - Columbo as Lt. Columbo; Karl Malden - The Streets of San Francisco as Mike Stone; Barry Newman - Petrocelli as Anthony J. Petrocelli	Lee Remick - Jennie: Lady Randolph Churchill as Lady Randolph Churchill: Angie Dickinson - Police Woman as Sgt. Suzanne "Pepper" Anderson; Rosemary Harris - Notorious Woman as George Sand; Michael Learned - The Waltons as Olivia Walton; Lee Meriwether - Barnaby Jones as Betty Jones
Best Performance in a Television Series – Musical or Comedy
Actor	Actress
Alan Alda - M*A*S*H as Benjamin Franklin "Hawkeye" Pierce: Johnny Carson - The Tonight Show Starring Johnny Carson as Various Characters; Redd Foxx - Sanford and Son as Fred G. Sanford; Hal Linden - Barney Miller as Captain Barney Miller; Bob Newhart - The Bob Newhart Show as Robert Hartley, Ph.D.; Carroll O'Connor - All in the Family as Archie Bunker	Cloris Leachman - Phyllis as Phyllis Lindstrom: Bea Arthur - Maude as Maude Findlay; Carol Burnett - The Carol Burnett Show as Various Characters; Valerie Harper - Rhoda as Rhoda Morgenstern; Mary Tyler Moore - The Mary Tyler Moore Show as Mary Richards
Best Supporting Performance in a Series, Miniseries or Television Film
Supporting Actor	Supporting Actress
Ed Asner - The Mary Tyler Moore Show as Lou Grant (TIE) Tim Conway - The Carol Burnett Show as Various Characters (TIE): Ted Knight - The Mary Tyler Moore Show as Ted Baxter; Rob Reiner - All in the Family as Michael Stivic; Jimmie Walker - Good Times as James "J.J." Evans, Jr.	Hermione Baddeley - Maude as Mrs. Nell Naugatuck: Susan Howard - Petrocelli as Maggie Petrocelli; Julie Kavner - Rhoda as Brenda Morgenstern; Nancy Walker - McMillan & Wife as Mildred; Nancy Walker - Rhoda as Ida Morgenstern

The following programs received multiple nominations:

Nominations	Title
4	The Mary Tyler Moore Show
3	All in the Family
3	The Carol Burnett Show
3	Petrocelli
3	Rhoda
2	Baretta
2	Barney Miller
2	Columbo
2	Kojak
2	Maude

The following programs received multiple wins:

Wins	Title
2	Kojak

== See also ==
- 48th Academy Awards
- 27th Primetime Emmy Awards
- 28th Primetime Emmy Awards
- 29th British Academy Film Awards
- 30th Tony Awards
- 1975 in film
- 1975 in television
