= Hot Dog...The Movie =

1984 film by Peter Markle

- Theatrical release poster by Phil Roberts
- Directed by: Peter Markle
- Written by: Mike Marvin
- Produced by: Edward S. Feldman; Mike Marvin
- Starring: David Naughton; Patrick Houser; Tracy N. Smith; John Patrick Neger; Frank Koppola; Shannon Tweed
- Cinematography: Paul Ryan
- Edited by: John Stewart
- Music by: Peter Bernstein
- Production companies: The Hotdog Partnership; United Artists; Metro-Goldwyn-Mayer
- Distributed by: MGM/UA Entertainment Co.
- Release date: January 13, 1984
- Running time: 96 minutes
- Country: United States
- Language: English
- Budget: $2 million
- Box office: $17.7 million or $22 million

Hot Dog...The Movie is a 1984 American sex comedy ski film directed by Peter Markle and written by ski filmmaker Mike Marvin, who choreographed and directed the ski footage. The film combines elements of sports and teen films and has become a cult film over the decades, especially in the US freestyle scene. While both contemporary and retrospective reviews are predominantly negative, the film was still a commercial success.

== Plot ==
Harkin Banks, a young and ambitious freestyle skier from Bonners Ferry, Idaho, travels to the Squaw Valley Ski Resort for the Freestyle World Championship. At a gas station he picks up the 17-year-old runaway Sunny, who is on her way to San Francisco. The two hit it off straight away and check into the resort together. At dinner they meet Harkin's idol, the Austrian Rudolph "Rudi" Garmisch, but are disgusted by his arrogance. Back in their room, Harkin impresses Sunny with his guitar playing and the two sleep together.

The next day is the qualification for the main competition, which Harkin overcomes easily. However, two of his compatriots are passed over despite a good performance because the organizers want to satisfy their European sponsors. Harkin befriends a group of fun-loving skiers led by freestyle veteran Dan O'Callahan, who are also competing in the Championship and call themselves “The Rat Pack." In the evening, Harkin and Sunny receive an invitation to a house party with the attractive skier Sylvia, who has her eye on him. After a disagreement with Sunny, Harkin allows himself to be seduced by the confident hostess and the two have sex in the bathtub. Sunny watches the whole thing and gets intimate with Rudi in the sauna.

The next morning, Rudi brags about his conquest on the slopes and provokes Harkin before the ski ballet segment. Thanks to excellent grades, Rudi wins and Harkin only ends up in fifth place, much to the audience's displeasure. Afterward, Sunny and Harkin confront each other about their missteps from the previous evening. Sunny prepares to leave, but ends up staying in town and trying to teach herself to ski. Despite Harkin's excellent performances on the moguls and aerials, Rudi also wins these two competitions and is crowned the superior freestyle world champion. Harkin has to be content with second place. The spectators suspect cheating and throw snowballs at the judges.

O'Callahan challenges Rudi and his entourage, the "Rudettes", to a so-called Chinese Downhill, a downhill race without rules, to clarify once and for all who the best skier is. The members of both groups compete against each other at the same time and race down the mountain. While one after the other falls, Harkin and Rudi at the front engage in a close race, which the former ultimately wins by the narrowest of margins. He grabs the World Cup trophy and is rewarded with a kiss by Sunny while the audience cheers him on.

== Cast ==
- David Naughton as Dan O'Callahan
- Patrick Houser as Harkin Banks
- Tracy Smith as Sunny
- John Patrick Reger as Rudolph "Rudi" Garmisch
- Frank Koppala as "Squirrel" Murphy
- James Saito as Kendo "Kamikaze" Yamamoto
- Shannon Tweed as Sylvia Fonda
- George Theobald as "Slasher"
- Mark Vance as Heinz Hartman
- Eric Watson as "Fergy"
- Lynn Wieland as Michelle
- Sandy Hackett as T-Shirt Contestant M.C.
- Crystal Smith as The Motel Clerk
- Peter Vogt as Fader Black
- Robert Fuhrmann as Rick Lauter
- David Chilton as The Corrupt Ski Judge

== Production ==
Screenwriter Mike Marvin grew up in Tahoe City and made several low-budget ski films in the early 1970s, including one about the freestyle scene and Earth Rider in 1972 about the first ski BASE jump from El Capitan. Hollywood producer Edward S. Feldman was impressed by Marvin's stories from his time as a ski filmmaker and offered him the prospect of a feature film if he could put these experiences into a screenplay from an athlete's perspective.

Originally planned in Aspen, filming finally took place in Squaw Valley, California, in the snowy winter of 1982. Since most of the actors could not ski, stunt doubles had to be used for all of the ski scenes, including Frank Beddor, who was very successful in the World Cup. Only Lynn Wieland and George Theobald actually came from the local freestyle scene. The 19-year-old Wieland was US champion in moguls and jumping in 1980 and 1981. The most famous actors were David Naughton and the 1981 Playmate of the Year Shannon Tweed. In addition, numerous locals from Squaw Valley and the surrounding area appeared as extras. The skiing shots were shot with a second unit under the direction of Mike Marvin. The film's most famous scene, the final descent, was filmed on the 1960 Olympic course and includes costumes that, in combination with the chase, are intended as an allusion to Mad Max 2. Marvin's screenplay was relatively vague, so much of the dialogue was improvised.

The expression "Chinese downhill" (to which the Japanese character Kendo asks "What the fuck is a Chinese downhill?") was picked up by Marvin about ten years before filming. Mass start races of this kind had a certain tradition in many ski resorts, even if there was no brutal physical contact like in the film. In Squaw Valley they were held until a fatal accident in 1974, and in Aspen they were called "Irish downhill".

According to the participants, in addition to generous pay, there was a lot of free time between shoots, which was spent celebrating wild parties. Years later, Marvin spoke of a "Sodom and Gomorrah behind the scenes".

== Reception ==
Metacritic, which uses a weighted average, assigned the film a score of 39 out of 100, based on 4 critics, indicating "generally unfavorable" reviews.

Janet Maslin, writing in The New York Times, gave a generally positive review, describing the film as "light and less moronic than it might have been." It is considered the most commercially successful ski film of all time.

Frederick Reimers and Sam Moulton of Outside, in a 2016 retrospective article, criticized the film's one-dimensional plot, use of sexist and racist stereotypes and gratuitous nudity. They characterized the film as "shockingly dated" along with many other teen films of the 1980s such as Porky's. However, they appreciated the film's depiction of ski culture's "devil-may-care spirit", which culminates in a wet T-shirt contest in the first half of the film. Both Marvin and a stunt double emphasized the authenticity of the escapades of sex, alcohol and drugs depicted. In recognition of the film and its actors, the 20th and 30th anniversaries were celebrated at the filming and shooting location of Squaw Valley.
