= Jan-Michael Vincent =

American actor (1944–2019)

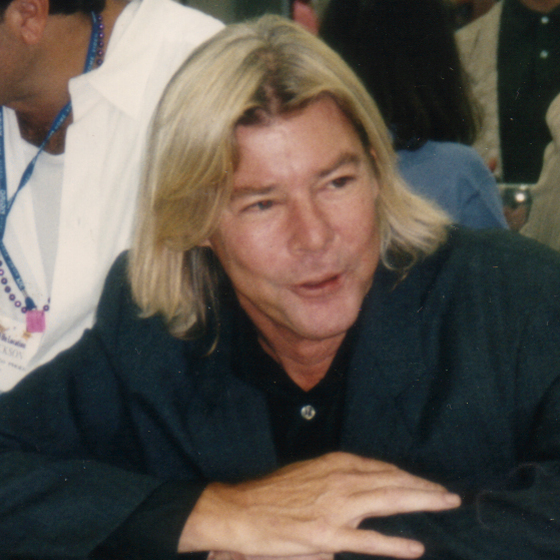
- Vincent in 1996
- Born: July 15, 1944; Denver, Colorado, U.S.
- Died: February 10, 2019 (aged 74); Asheville, North Carolina, U.S.
- Other name: Mike Vincent
- Occupation: Actor
- Years active: 1964–2003
- Spouses: Bonnie Poorman (m. 1968; div. 1977); Joanne Robinson (m. 1986; div. 1999); Patricia Ann Christ (m. 2000)
- Children: 1

Jan-Michael Vincent (July 15, 1944 – February 10, 2019) was an American actor. He emerged as a leading man in the 1970s, playing notable roles in films like Going Home (1971), which earned him a Golden Globe nomination for Best Supporting Actor – Motion Picture; The Mechanic (1972), Damnation Alley (1977), and Big Wednesday (1978). He earned his second Golden Globe nomination for his role on the television miniseries The Winds of War (1983) before starring as helicopter pilot Stringfellow Hawke on the television series Airwolf (1984–87).

At the height of his career, Vincent was the highest-paid actor on American television. His success was tempered by a troubled personal and professional life, exacerbated by substance abuse and legal problems. After leaving Airwolf, he appeared in low-budget and independent films until retiring in 2003.

== Early life ==
Jan-Michael Vincent was born in Denver, Colorado, where his father was stationed after enlisting in the United States Army in 1941. His father, Lloyd Whiteley Vincent (September 7, 1919 – August 30, 2000), was born in Tulare, California, and raised in nearby Hanford in the San Joaquin Valley. His mother, Doris Jane (née Pace; August 2, 1925 – February 22, 1993), was born in Arkansas and moved to Hanford as a child.

Vincent's grandfather, Herbert Vincent (September 26, 1876 – January 14, 1974), was a bank robber and counterfeiter who committed robberies in the 1920s and 1930s. Vincent's uncle, Lloyd's brother Hoy, was shot to death in Tulare by a deputy sheriff and was wanted for a robbery in Oregon. Two of Vincent's other uncles, Clifford and Harold, were convicted of bank robbery in Hardwick, California and Strathmore, California in 1931. In January 1932, Herbert and his son Gordon were arrested in Hanford for bank robbery and assault with a deadly weapon, which left Lloyd alone at age twelve.

Lloyd Vincent and Doris met in 1940 when she was 15 and Lloyd had finished high school. Lloyd was stationed in Denver in 1941 as a B-25 bomber pilot during World War II, and he married Doris there when she was sixteen. Vincent's mistrust of authority came from seeing his father in the Army being told what to do and when to do it. Vincent's sister, Jaqueline "Jacquie" Vincent, was born in 1947. His brother, Christopher, was born in 1952. After the war, Lloyd became a painter, like Vincent's grandfather, and later developed alcoholism. By the time Vincent was born in 1944, his parents owned a sign company in Hanford.

Vincent attended school in Hanford and graduated in 1963 from Hanford High School. He attended Ventura College in Ventura, California, for three years and recalled, "I would have completed college, but the registration clerk literally shut the window in my face for the lunch hour", and Vincent took his $200 and went to Mexico instead. Vincent later served in the California Army National Guard and remained in the National Guard Reserve until 1971.

== Career ==
Vincent's first acting job was in 1967 in The Bandits, starring and co-directed by Robert Conrad. Also in 1967, Vincent appeared in the TV movie The Hardy Boys: The Mystery of the Chinese Junk.

In the late 1960s, Vincent was signed to Universal Studios and appeared in several television series. He appeared in the Dragnet 1968 second season premiere episode "The Grenade", as a muscular high school student who suffered an acid attack by a mentally unstable classmate (played by Mickey Sholdar). Vincent also appeared in the Danger Island segments of Hanna-Barbera's The Banana Splits series as Link (1968–1969). His first starring role was in the fall of 1969 in the prime-time soap opera The Survivors, alongside Lana Turner and George Hamilton; the series was canceled mid-season.

Vincent also acted in several movies in the late 1960s, including the 1969 20th Century Fox movie The Undefeated (as Bubba Wilkes), starring John Wayne, Rock Hudson, and Antonio Aguilar. His name appeared as Michael Vincent in the credits of the movie. Vincent guest-starred in three episodes of Lassie with actor Tony Dow and two episodes of Bonanza.

In 1970, Vincent was praised for his role in the TV movie Tribes (also known as The Soldier Who Declared Peace in Europe and the UK), co-starring Darren McGavin, about a tough Marine boot-camp drill instructor dealing with a hippie draftee (Vincent) who will not follow the rules. He performed opposite Robert Mitchum in Going Home (1971). That same year, he appeared in the Gunsmoke episode "The Legend".

In 1972, Vincent appeared with Charles Bronson in the crime film The Mechanic and the made-for-TV love story Sandcastles. In 1973, Vincent starred in the Disney comedy The World's Greatest Athlete, with Tim Conway and John Amos. Vincent played Richie, an alcoholic teen in the 1973 Marcus Welby, M.D. episode, "Catch a Ring That Isn't There". Also in 1973, he was in the made-for-TV-movie Deliver Us from Evil as Nick Fleming opposite George Kennedy.

Vincent starred as the anti-hero Buster Lane in the 1974 romance Buster and Billie, wherein he startled audiences with his full-frontal nudity. In Bite the Bullet (1975), he played opposite Gene Hackman, James Coburn, and Candice Bergen. He starred in the trucker movie White Line Fever (1975); in Baby Blue Marine (1976), a war film directed by John D. Hancock, which also starred Glynnis O'Connor; and in Shadow of the Hawk (1976) co-starring Marilyn Hassett. Vincent also starred in Damnation Alley (1977), based on Roger Zelazny's science fiction novel. Two more 1978 appearances were the surfing film Big Wednesday with William Katt and Gary Busey, and Hooper with Burt Reynolds, in which Vincent played a young stuntman.

In 1980, Vincent starred in the gang-themed drama Defiance, which received a limited release. In that film, he and Danny Aiello co-star as Manhattan residents who fight back against the gang members who terrorize their neighborhood. That year, Vincent appeared in The Return, a science-fiction film that was released directly to television and video. In 1981, he co-starred with Kim Basinger in Hard Country, and in 1983, he starred in the action film Last Plane Out.

After completing his role as Byron Henry ("Briny") in the 1983 television miniseries The Winds of War, Vincent was cast as Stringfellow Hawke for the action-espionage series Airwolf, in which he co-starred with Ernest Borgnine. It is the role for which he is best known and remembered. It was noted at the time that Vincent's salary for his work on Airwolf was $200,000 per episode, the highest of any actor in American television at the time. While filming Airwolf, Vincent admitted to drug and alcohol problems for which he acknowledged seeking help. After Airwolf, he found roles in smaller-budget and lower-exposure film projects.

Vincent worked with Traci Lords in the 1991 suspense film Raw Nerve. He also co-starred with Clint Howard in the 1995 black comedy/horror film Ice Cream Man, which had a very limited theatrical release but eventually reached cult status via home video as an unintentional comedy. In 1994, he played in a South African-produced movie called Ipi Tombi, produced and directed by Tommie Meyer and based on a musical by Bertha Egnos.

While in the hospital in 1996, Vincent was committed to a role in Red Line with Chad McQueen as Keller. He appeared in the film with a swollen face and scars, and still wearing his hospital ID bracelet. In 1997, he had a small guest role on Nash Bridges, playing the title character's long-lost brother, and in 1998 he had a cameo role in the independent film Buffalo '66. His last role was in the independent film White Boy (titled Menace for the US video market), released in March 2003.

== Personal life ==
Vincent married Bonnie Poorman in 1968, and they had a daughter in 1973. The couple's divorce was finalized in 1986.

Vincent remarried in 1986. His second wife, Joanne Robinson, left him and filed a restraining order against him in 1998, alleging that he had abused her during their marriage.

=== Substance abuse and health issues ===
He battled alcoholism and intravenous drug use for much of his life. In 1977, 1978, and 1979 he was arrested for possession of cocaine, and in 1984 and 1985 he was arrested after two bar brawls.

In 1986, he was charged with felony assault, but was acquitted after his attorney argued that the woman tripped and fell on a telephone cord in his home. In 1988, Vincent was arrested for drunk driving, but avoided jail by entering rehab. In 2000, a $374,000 default judgment was made against him after his former girlfriend alleged he had physically assaulted her after their breakup and caused her to miscarry their child.

In the 1990s, he was involved in three severe automobile collisions, which he barely survived. The first near-fatal accident occurred in February 1992. In the second accident, in August 1996, Vincent broke three vertebrae in his neck. He sustained a permanent injury to his vocal cords from an emergency medical procedure, leaving him with a permanently raspy voice.

Vincent was charged with drunk driving again after his 1996 accident, and again sentenced to rehabilitation and placed on probation. In an interview on the television program The Insider in September 2007, when asked about his 1996 car accident, Vincent answered "Y'know, I have no idea what you're talking about. I don't remember being in an accident."

In 2000, Vincent violated probation for his prior alcohol-related arrests by appearing drunk in public three times and assaulting his fiancée. As a result, he was sentenced to 60 days in the Orange County Jail. In 2008, Vincent was involved in another automobile accident.

In an October 2014 interview with the National Enquirer, Vincent revealed that his right leg had been amputated just below the knee in 2012 after he contracted a leg infection as a result of complications from peripheral artery disease. After that, he walked with a prosthetic limb, although he was sometimes forced to use a wheelchair.

== Death ==
Vincent died on February 10, 2019, at the age of 74 in Asheville, North Carolina, due to cardiac arrest while hospitalized at Mission Hospital. Bradycardia, a decreased heart rate, was listed as an underlying cause of death. His death was publicly announced on March 8, when TMZ broke the news and showed a partially redacted copy of Vincent's death certificate.

== Filmography ==
=== Film ===
Year	Title	Role	Notes
1967	The Hardy Boys: The Mystery of the Chinese Junk	Tony Prito	
1967	The Bandits	Taye "Boy" Brown	
1968	Journey to Shiloh	"Little Bit" Lucket	
1969	The Undefeated	Lt. Bubba Wilkes	
1971	Going Home	Jimmy Graham	
1972	The Mechanic	Steve McKenna	
1973	The World's Greatest Athlete	Nanu	
1974	Buster and Billie	Buster Lane	
1975	Bite the Bullet	Carbo	
1975	White Line Fever	Carrol Jo Hummer	
1976	Baby Blue Marine	Marion	
1976	Shadow of the Hawk	Mike	
1976	Vigilante Force	Ben Arnold	
1977	Damnation Alley	Tanner	
1978	Big Wednesday	Matt Johnson	
1978	Hooper	Delmore "Ski" Shidski	
1980	Defiance	Tommy	
1980	The Return	Wayne	
1981	Hard Country	Kyle	
1983	Last Plane Out	Jack Cox	
1984	Airwolf: The Movie	Stringfellow Hawke	
1985	Get Out of My Room	Immigration Officer	
1987	Enemy Territory	Parker	
1987	Born in East L.A.	McCalister	
1989	Hit List	Jack Collins	
1989	Deadly Embrace	Stewart Moreland	direct-to-video
1989	Dirty Games	Kepler West	
1989	Alienator	Commander	
1989	Demonstone	Andy Buck	
1990	Xtro II: The Second Encounter	Dr. Ron Shepherd	
1990	Haunting Fear	Detective James Trent	direct-to-video
1990	In Gold We Trust	Oliver Moss	
1991	Hangfire	Colonel Johnson	
1991	Raw Nerve	Lieutenant Bruce Ellis	
1992	The Divine Enforcer	Father Thomas	direct-to-video
1992	Animal Instincts	Fletcher Ross	direct-to-video
1992	Beyond the Call of Duty	Len Jordan	
1993	Midnight Witness	Lance	
1993	Sins of Desire	Warren Robillard	
1993	Hidden Obsession	Ben Scanlon	
1993	Deadly Heroes	Cody Grant	
1993	Indecent Behavior	Tom Mathis	
1994	Ipi Tombi	Steven Gilbert	
1995	Abducted II: The Reunion	Brad Allen	
1995	Body Count	Detective Reinhart	
1995	Ice Cream Man	Detective Gifford	direct-to-video
1995	Red Line	Keller	direct-to-video
1995	Russian Roulette: Moscow 95	Captain Nazarov	
1996	The Last Kill		
1998	Buffalo '66	Sonny	
1998	No Rest for the Wicked	Sheriff Juan Ramirez	
2000	Escape to Grizzly Mountain	Trapper	
2000	The Thundering 8th	Captain Otis Buchwald	
2003	White Boy	Ron Masters	

=== Television ===
Year	Title	Role	Notes
1967	The Hardy Boys: The Mystery of the Chinese Junk	Tony Prito	credited as Mike Vincent
1967	Dragnet	Rick Schneiderman	episode: "The Grenade" (S 2:Ep 1); credited as Michael Vincent
1968	Lassie	Chris Hanford	episodes: "Hanford's Point", Parts 1–3 (S 14:Ep 26–28); credited as Michael Vincent
1968	Bonanza	Eddie MaKay	episode: "The Arrival of Eddie" (S 9:Ep 30); credited as Michael Vincent
1968–1969	The Banana Splits Adventure Hour; Danger Island	Lincoln "Link" Simmons	recurring (10 episodes); credited as Michael Vincent
1969	Bonanza	Rick Miller	episode: "The Unwanted" (S 10:Ep 27); credited as Michael Vincent
1969–1970	The Survivors^{1}	Jeffrey Hastings	main cast (10 episodes)
1970	Tribes	Adrian	
1971	Dan August	Kevin Colter	episode: "Death Chain" (S 1:Ep 15)^{2}
1971	Men at Law	Guest	episode: "One American" (S 1:Ep 23)
1971	The Persuaders!	Helicopter Pilot	episode: "The Gold Napoleon" (S 1:Ep 2); uncredited
1971	The Last of the Powerseekers^{1}	Jeffrey Hastings	
1971	Gunsmoke	Travis Colter	episode "The Legend" (S 17:Ep 6)
1972	The Catcher	Sam Callende	
1972	Sandcastles	Michael	
1973	Marcus Welby, M.D.	Ritchie Manning	episode: "Catch a Ring That Isn't There" (S 4:Ep 20)
1973	Deliver Us from Evil	Nick Fleming	
1973	Toma	Billy Haskell	episode: "Blockhouse Breakdown"
1973–1975	Police Story	Warren Yates / Dave Hauser	episodes: "Incident in the Kill Zone" "Line of Fire"
1975	Dinah!	Himself	1 episode
1975	The Mike Douglas Show	Himself	1 episode
1983	The Winds of War	Byron Henry	miniseries
1984–1986	Airwolf	Stringfellow Hawke	main cast (55 episodes)
1986	Hotel	Nick Hauser	episode "Undercurrents"
1987	Six Against the Rock	Miran "Buddy" Thompson	
1989	Tarzan in Manhattan	Brightmore	
1991	The Final Heist	David King	
1993	Singapore Sling	Billy	
1994	Renegade	Max	episode: "Hard Rider"
1996	Jurassic Women	Zepp	
1996	Lethal Orbit	Riff	
1997	Nash Bridges	Bobby Chase	episode "Revelations"

== Bibliography ==
- Hyatt, Wesley (2003). Short-Lived Television Series, 1948-1978: Thirty Years of More Than 1,000 Flops (1st ed.). New York City: McFarland & Company. p. 193. ISBN 978-0786414208.
