= Shadow of the Hawk =

1976 film directed by George McCowan

- Theatrical release poster
- Directed by: George McCowan
- Screenplay by: Norman Thaddeus Vane; Herbert Wright
- Story by: Peter Jensen; Lynette Cahill; Norman Thaddeus Vane
- Produced by: John Kemeny
- Starring: Jan-Michael Vincent; Marilyn Hassett; Chief Dan George
- Cinematography: John Holbrook; Reginald H. Morris
- Edited by: O. Nicholas Brown
- Music by: Robert McMullin
- Production company: Columbia Pictures
- Distributed by: Columbia Pictures
- Release date: July 14, 1976
- Running time: 92 minutes
- Countries: United States; Canada
- Language: English
- Box office: $1.5 million (Canada)

Shadow of the Hawk is a 1976 horror film directed by George McCowan and written by Norman Thaddeus Vane and Herbert Wright. The film stars Jan-Michael Vincent, Marilyn Hassett, Chief Dan George, Pia Shandel, Marianne Jones and Jacques Hubert.

An international co-production of the United States and Canada, Shadow of the Hawk was shot on location in British Columbia, with West Vancouver and the Lynn Canyon Suspension Bridge used as backdrops throughout. The film was released on July 14, 1976, by Columbia Pictures.

== Plot ==
An old Native American Shaman Hawk trains his skeptical grandson Mike to take over for him as the new tribal “Medicine Man” of his small village. Along the way, they battle Hawk's enemies and their black magic.

== Cast ==
- Jan-Michael Vincent as Mike
- Marilyn Hassett as Maureen
- Chief Dan George as Old Man Hawk
- Pia Shandel as Faye
- Marianne Jones as Dsonoqua
- Jacques Hubert as Andak
- Cindi Griffith as Secretary
- Anna Hagan as Desk Nurse
- Murray Lowry as Intern

== Release ==
=== Home media ===
The film was released for the first time on DVD by Sony Pictures Home Entertainment on November 1, 2011. It was scheduled to be released on Blu-ray by Mill Creek Entertainment on October 2, 2018, as a double feature alongside Nightwing.

== Reception ==
Critical response for Shadow of the Hawk has been mostly negative. Roger Ebert gave the film two out of four stars, criticizing the film's screenplay, and dialogue. Time Out London panned the film, calling it "A tired, TV-style chase movie", and stated that the film's only point of interest was Chief Dan George's performance.

Alternately, Kurt Dahlke of DVD Talk gave the film a more positive review, commending the film's imagery, and special effects, while also noting the occasional "static pacing", and what he called "dueling-eye-closeups".

The film was the third-highest-grossing English language Canadian film of all time in Canada with a gross of $1.5 million.
