= The Mystery of the Chinese Junk =

1960 book by Franklin W. Dixon

- Original edition
- Author: Franklin W. Dixon
- Language: English
- Series: The Hardy Boys
- Genre: Detective, mystery
- Publisher: Grosset & Dunlap
- Publication date: 1960
- Publication place: United States
- Media type: Print (hardback & paperback)
- Pages: 184 pages
- Preceded by: The Mystery at Devil's Paw
- Followed by: Mystery of the Desert Giant

The Mystery of the Chinese Junk is the thirty-ninth volume in the original The Hardy Boys series of mystery books for children and teens published by Grosset & Dunlap.

This book was written for the Stratemeyer Syndicate by James Duncan Lawrence (who also authored the majority of the Tom Swift Jr. series) in 1960.

== Plot summary ==
The Hardys purchase a Chinese junk named the Hai Hau to ferry passengers to Rocky Isle and make some extra money. Four mysterious men also are interested in the boat because of treasure hidden inside Chet Morton and Sam Radley, also join the mystery. Their Chinese-American friend, Jim Foy, also lends a hand to them. George Ti-Ming is a private detective who helps his friend in Hong Kong find his missing ship. Chin Gok and Mr. Montrose are very interested in the junk because they think that the junk has treasure. Finally, the Hardys solve the mystery and share their rewards with their friends. Chin Gok, Mr. Montrose and the two phony Coast Guard members are caught by the Bayport Police Department Chief, Police Chief Collig.

== Television adaptation ==
The book was adapted into a 1967 television pilot of the same name (it was not picked up), scripted by Richard Murphy and directed by Larry Peerce. Tim Matheson and Richard Gates (as Rick Gates) starred as Joe and Frank Hardy, respectively. Teri Garr played Susie, and Jan-Michael Vincent (as Mike Vincent) played Tony Prito.
