= The Bell Jar (1979 film) =

1979 film by Larry Peerce

- Directed by: Larry Peerce
- Screenplay by: Marjorie Kellogg
- Based on: The Bell Jar by Sylvia Plath
- Produced by: Jarrold T. Brandt Jr. Mike Todd Jr.
- Starring: Marilyn Hassett; Julie Harris; Anne Jackson; Barbara Barrie; Robert Klein
- Cinematography: Gerald Hirschfeld
- Edited by: Marvin Walowitz
- Music by: Gerald Fried
- Distributed by: AVCO Embassy Pictures
- Release date: March 21, 1979
- Running time: 107 minutes
- Country: United States
- Language: English
- Budget: $2 million

The Bell Jar is a 1979 American psychological drama film based on Sylvia Plath's 1963 book The Bell Jar. It was directed by Larry Peerce and stars Marilyn Hassett and Julie Harris. The story follows a young woman's summer in New York working for a women's magazine, her return home to New England and her psychological breakdown within the context of the difficulties of the 1950s, including the Rosenbergs' execution, the disturbing aspects of pop culture, and the distraction of predatory college boys.

== Plot ==
The story depicts a young woman's summer in New York working for a Mademoiselle-type magazine, returning home to New England, and having a mental breakdown amid the 1950s.

== Cast ==
- Marilyn Hassett as Esther Greenwood
- Julie Harris as Mrs. Greenwood
- Anne Jackson as Dr. Nolan
- Barbara Barrie as Jay Cee
- Robert Klein as Lenny
- Donna Mitchell as Joan
- Mary Louise Weller as Doreen
- Jameson Parker as Buddy Willard
- Thaao Penghlis as Marco
- Scott McKay as Mr. Gilling
- Meg Mundy as Bea Ramsey
- Carole Monferdini as Hilda
- Debbie McLeod as Betsy
- Elizabeth Hubbard as Vikki St. John

Mia Farrow had been approached for the lead role at one point.

== Production ==
Filmmakers had been trying to adapt the novel for the screen since the early 1970s.

The film was shot in June and July 1978 at Rutgers University in New Jersey, Four Winds Hospital in Katonah, New York and at various locations in New York City. The fashion-show scenes were shot on the seventh-floor terrace of the International Building in New York City.

== Reception ==
Janet Maslin of The New York Times was unimpressed, stating that the film's portrayal of Esther was "disastrous...because it is the character's imaginative life that leads her to a collapse, and the movie barely even goes skin-deep. The audience isn't given the slightest clue about Esther's quirks, her fears, her peculiarly distorted notion of herself." The film has a "way of spelling things out ad nauseam and still not making them clear." Even where it should have flourished, like in descriptions of Esther's life in New York, "there's no satirical edge to any of this, and no dramatic edge either. It all simply plods along, en route to a nervous collapse that manages to seem perfectly unwarranted by the time it finally occurs."

Variety wrote: "Despite some decent performances, 'The Bell Jar,' based on the late poet Sylvia Plath's autobiographical novel, evokes neither understanding or sympathy for the plight of its heroine...As played by Marilyn Hassett, who has a cool, Seventeen magazine kind of prettiness, Esther emerges as a selfish, morbid little prig."

Gene Siskel of the Chicago Tribune gave the film one star out of four and called it "downright laughable, a stormy TV soap opera without that genre's sense of humor. The Bell Jar is more than just a bad movie. It's a bad movie based on a book that has meant much to many, and they will be bitterly disappointed."

Kevin Thomas of the Los Angeles Times wrote that the film "would be ideal material for Ingmar Bergman, or more appropriately, since it is an American work, for the Woody Allen of Interiors. It cries for imagery and stylization—some kind of visual expression of Esther's perceptions and torments, but Peerce's approach is resolutely literal...Luckily, Marilyn Hassett's Esther is involving and thoroughly convincing—if you're prepared to share her frequent pain at merely being alive."

Judith Martin of The Washington Post wrote the film seemed "especially cruel" to kill Sylvia Plath again "by reputation," by making the heroine of her story "an elitist hysteric."

Jack Kroll of Newsweek wrote that "Marjorie Kellogg's screenplay is reasonably faithful to Plath's novel on the surface, but the movie totally lacks the mythic rhythm and force underneath the book's easy, colloquial style...Marilyn Hassett looks like Plath with her fine-drawn Puritan beauty, but her clean, strong acting can't overcome the film's stifling conventionality of style."

Penelope Gilliatt of The New Yorker wrote: "A lot that is serious and troubled about insanity has been written in world literature, painted, and also dealt with on film. This picture is merely hysterical."

The Bell Jar holds a 0% rating on Rotten Tomatoes, based on eight reviews.

== Lawsuit ==
After the film's release, Boston psychiatrist Dr. Jane V. Anderson claimed that she was portrayed as the Joan character and filed a lawsuit. In the film, Joan attempts to convince Esther to agree to a suicide pact, an incident that is not in the book. Joan is implied to be a lesbian in Plath's novel, but it never is explicitly stated. Anderson's lawyer said that the film portrayal "has grossly damaged her reputation as a practicing psychiatrist and a member of the Harvard Medical School faculty." The lawsuit was settled in 1987 for $150,000.

The British Library holds the archive of poetry, diary entries, correspondence and copies of legal documents relating to the lawsuit, information that sheds light on the publication of The Bell Jar in the U.S. and the difficulties surrounding the film adaptation.
