= Junior Bounous =

American skier and businessman

Junior Bounous (born August 24, 1925, in Provo, Utah, United States) has been known as a "Pioneer in the American Ski Industry" (as quoted by Chuck Rowan in his nomination for Bounous into the National Ski Hall of Fame) and has been skiing the Wasatch Mountains and elsewhere for over 80 years. He is known for his ski accomplishments and teaching.

== Early beginnings ==
Junior Bounous was born on August 24, 1925, in Provo, Utah. He was the sixth child of Italian fruit farmers, and grew up learning how to ride horses, ice skate, and take care of the farm. Since farm life was busy, his parents never thought of a name for him at the time of his birth, so until well into his mid-20s his birth certificate read "Boy Bounous". Being the youngest of a large family, his unofficial name became "Junior" immediately, and since then no one has ever thought about changing it.

Growing up in Provo Canyon, he was introduced to multiple winter sports at a young age. One in particular that he immediately became attracted to was skiing. At the age of 8, he made his own pair of skis out of barrel staves that his dad had cut out for him. He taught himself how to move on skis near home, where he would hike up a small hill in his backyard and then push himself down. Since it was not very big, he usually only got one turn from it, and it typically was a left turn as to avoid a pile of manure at the bottom of the hill. To this day, Bounous claims that his left turn is better than his right because of this.

When he was 11 years old, his mother bought him his first pair of real skis. When he was still in his teens, Bounous became friends with Ray Stewart. Also a skier, Stewart's wealthy family had bought a large plot of land in Provo Canyon, and Stewart wanted help setting up a rope tow. At the age of 18, Bounous helped him set one up, and played a role in scouting for a place to put it and finding an adequate run that skiers of all abilities would be use.

== Ski career ==
In 1943 Bounous joined the Civilian Defense Corps, created at Timp Haven as a group of individuals who were essentially the first ski patrol in the area. They did search and rescue efforts in Provo Canyon in both the summer and the winter during the war period. Bounous's ski talents were to be used for something else however, as a new prominent figure entered Junior's life.

In 1939, the second chairlift in the nation and the first in Utah opened in Alta Ski Resort. Bounous moved down from Sun Valley to work with Alf Engen and his brother Sverre to get the ski resort going. Bounous at the time was mainly interested in competing in cross-country skiing, and because Engen was the best cross-country skier in the nation at the time, Bounous went to him for lessons around 1945. The reasons for the lessons changed quickly as Junior realized that was more interested in the techniques of teaching people to ski instead of competing.

Engen taught him his philosophy on ski instructing, one that highlighted the enjoyment of skiing in contrast to the strict ways of the Austrians that had been used before. In 1948 Engen encouraged Bounous to apply for certification of ski instructing. Bounous passed, and at the young age of 23 got his Forest Service Certification, being one of the first to achieve it. Engen hired him as a full-time instructor at Alta, and from 1948 to 1958 Bounous worked as Engen's professional assistant.

In 1958 Bounous was offered a job at California's Sugar Bowl Ski Resort as their ski school director. He accepted, becoming one of the first American-born ski school directors ever. While under him, the ski school staff grew from five to 15 in seven years. He created Sugar Bowl's first children's program before moving back to Utah in the 1960s to go back to the now popular Timp Haven Ski Resort, where he became a part-time owner until Robert Redford bought the resort in 1969. Though the name was changed to Sundance, Redford kept Bounous there as ski school director for a few more years, during which Bounous helped expand the resort.

In 1970 a new opportunity arrived. Ted Johnson and Richard Bass came to Bounous, asking him to help them map out the area for a new ski resort that they wanted to open up next to Alta Ski Resort in Little Cottonwood Canyon, Utah. Bounous was hired to do the entire layout of ski runs for the resort and directed the cutting crews and bulldozer work. Once the new Snowbird ski resort opened up in 1971, Bounous became the first ski school director. Under him, Snowbird's ski school became ranked as one of the top in the nation, a position it still holds to this today.

As ski school director, Bounous created a children's program as well as a program for the disabled. In 1991, Bounous accepted the position of director of skiing, and created his most famous program, one meant for senior citizens called "Silver Wings". Over his life he was also filmed in well over ten Warren Miller films. "I went out of my way to put him in the films for a long time because he was so much better than anyone else," Miller said in an interview for the documentary film Bounousabuse: 80 Junior Years. In one Miller film, Bounous puts his skis on backwards and skis down the hill with his back facing down, becoming one of the first to do so.
