= Larry Peerce =

American film and TV director (born 1930)

- Born: Lawrence Peerce; April 19, 1930 (age 96); The Bronx, New York, U.S.
- Occupation: Director
- Years active: 1958–2003
- Spouses: Marilyn Hassett (divorced); Beth Leichter Peerce (m. 2002)
- Parent: Jan Peerce (father)

Lawrence Peerce (born April 19, 1930) is an American film and TV director whose work includes the theatrical feature Goodbye, Columbus (1969), the early rock and roll concert film The Big T.N.T. Show (1965), One Potato, Two Potato (1964), The Other Side of the Mountain (1975) and Two-Minute Warning (1976).

== Life and career ==
The son of operatic tenor Jan Peerce and talent agent Alice (Kalmanowitz) Peerce, Larry was born in The Bronx, New York. He attended the University of North Carolina. He made his directing debut with One Potato, Two Potato, released in 1964 by the distributor Cinema V. The groundbreaking drama about an interracial marriage between a white divorcee (played by Barbara Barrie, who won the Best Actress award at the 1964 Cannes Film Festival for the role) and an African-American office worker (Bernie Hamilton) was the first U.S. movie to portray such an interracial relationship.

Peerce went on to direct several episodes of the television series Branded, the superhero series Batman, and other shows, and then directed the early rock and roll concert film The Big T.N.T. Show, released in 1965 by American International Pictures. It featured The Byrds, Ray Charles, Bo Diddley, Donovan, The Lovin' Spoonful, The Ronettes and The Ike & Tina Turner Revue.

Following more television, Peerce returned to film in 1967 with The Mystery of the Chinese Junk and The Incident, the latter of which starred Martin Sheen and Tony Musante. He followed this with Goodbye, Columbus, an adaptation of the Philip Roth novel. The movie earned Peerce a DGA Award nomination for Outstanding Directorial Achievement in Motion Pictures and screenwriter Arnold Schulman an Academy Award nomination for Best Writing, Screenplay Based on Material from Another Medium.

Peerce's subsequent theatrical features included The Sporting Club, A Separate Peace, Ash Wednesday, and The Other Side of the Mountain. He directed the television movies The Stranger Who Looks Like Me (1974), and Elvis and Me (1988), and directed several episodes of the children's television series The Ghost Busters a.k.a. The Original Ghostbusters, and after more theatrical films did not meet success, he became a frequent director of television miniseries, including Queenie (ABC, 1987), The Neon Empire (Showtime, 1988), the Jacqueline Kennedy biography A Woman Named Jackie (NBC, 1991) and John Jakes' Heaven and Hell: North and South Book III (ABC, 1994). He additionally did several more television movies, ending with Second Honeymoon (2001), starring Roma Downey and Tim Matheson. He directed one episode of the 1960s CBS series The Wild Wild West as Lawrence Peerce. He also directed an episode of the television show The Green Hornet.

Peerce was married for a time to Marilyn Hassett, who appeared in several films he directed in the mid to late 1970s.

== Filmography ==
- One Potato, Two Potato (1964) – nominated, Best Original Screenplay Academy Award (Orville Hampton, Raphael Hayes); winner, Best Actress, Cannes Film Festival (Barbara Barrie); nominated, Palme d'Or, Cannes Film Festival
- The Big T.N.T. Show (1965)
- The Mystery of the Chinese Junk (1967) (TV movie)
- The Incident (1967) – winner, Best Art Film, Cinema Writers Circle Award; Best Actor Award, Mar del Plata Film Festival (Tony Musante)
- Goodbye, Columbus (1969) – nominated, Best Adapted Screenplay Academy Award (Arnold Schulman); nominated, Best Director DGA Award (Larry Peerce)
- The Sporting Club (1971)
- A Separate Peace (1972)
- Ash Wednesday (1973) – nominated, Best Actress Golden Globe Award (Elizabeth Taylor)
- The Stranger Who Looks Like Me (1974) (TV movie)
- The Other Side of the Mountain (1975) – nominated, Best Song Academy Award (Charles Fox, Norman Gimbel); winner, Best Actress Debut Golden Globe Award (Marilyn Hassett); nominated, Best Actress Golden Globe Award (Marilyn Hassett); nominated, Best Original Score Golden Globe Award (Charles Fox); nominated, Best Song Golden Globe Award (Charles Fox, Norman Gimbel)
- Two-Minute Warning (1976) – nominated, Best Film Editing Academy Award (Walter Hannemann, Eve Newman)
- The Other Side of the Mountain Part 2 (1978)
- The Bell Jar (1979)
- Why Would I Lie? (1980) – nominated, Best Picture (fantasy/comedy), Young Artist Awards; nominated, Best Young Actor, Young Artist Awards (Gabriel Macht)
- Love Child (1982) – nominated, New Star of Year Golden Globe Award (Amy Madigan)
- Hard to Hold (1984)
- Love Lives On (1985) (TV movie)
- The Fifth Missile (1986) (TV movie)
- Prison for Children (1987) (TV movie)
- Queenie (1987) (television miniseries)
- Elvis and Me (1988) (television miniseries)
- Wired (1989)
- The Neon Empire (1989) (television miniseries)
- The Court-Martial of Jackie Robinson (1990) (TV movie)
- A Woman Named Jackie (1991) (television miniseries)
- Child of Rage (1992) (TV movie)
- Poisoned by Love: The Kern County Murders (1993) (TV movie)
- A Burning Passion: The Margaret Mitchell Story (1994) (TV movie)
- Christmas Every Day (1996) (TV movie)
- The Test of Love (1999) (TV movie)
