= Lew Gallo =

American character actor and producer

- Born: June 12, 1928; Mount Kisco, New York, U.S.
- Died: June 11, 2000 (aged 71); Los Angeles, California, U.S.
- Occupation: Screenwriter
- Years active: 1958–2000
- Spouse: Lillian Gallo (m. 1958–2000)
- Children: 2

Lewis D. Gallo (June 12, 1928 – June 11, 2000) was an American character actor and producer, best known for his role as Maj. Joseph Cobb on the 1960s ABC World War II series Twelve O'Clock High.

Gallo was born in Mount Kisco, New York, and he served as an Army infantryman during the Korean War.

He also made appearances on other TV series including Rawhide, Dr. Kildare, Straightway, Lost in Space, The F.B.I., Gunsmoke, The Twilight Zone, Perry Mason, Tales of Wells Fargo, Combat!, and Get Smart. He also appeared in the films Ocean's 11, PT 109, and Pork Chop Hill.

Gallo appeared on Broadway in Will Success Spoil Rock Hunter? (1955). During this time he met his wife, television producer Lillian Gallo; they were married for 42 years until his death. They had two children, Mary Ann and Tom.

As a producer he worked on such series as That Girl, Love, American Style, The Ghost & Mrs. Muir and The New Mike Hammer.

Gallo died on June 11, 2000, in Los Angeles, California, the day before his 72nd birthday.

== Filmography ==
Year	Title	Role	Notes
1958	I Want to Live!	Mr. Thomas - Undercover Cop at Bar	Uncredited
1959	Pork Chop Hill	Lieutenant, Division Public Relations	
1959	Odds Against Tomorrow	Moriarty	
1960	Ocean's 11	Adele's Date	
1963	PT 109	Yeoman Rogers	
1963	Soldier in the Rain	Sgt. Fred Lenahan	
1978	The Cheap Detective	Cop	
1984	Hard to Hold	2nd Cab Driver	

== Television ==
Year	Title	Role	Notes
1958	Gunsmoke	Joe Spangler	S4:E8: "Lost Rifle"
1959	Gunsmoke	Sted Rutger	S5E9: "Brother Whelp"
1960	Perry Mason	Richard Gilman	S3:E17: "The Case of the Mythical Monkeys"
1960	Rawhide	Colley	S3:E8: "Incident at Poco Tiempo"
1961	Rawhide	Haskell	S4:E3: "The Long Shakedown"
1963	The Twilight Zone	Lt. Engle	S4:E16: "On Thursday We Leave for Home"
1966	Gunsmoke	Outlaw Spellman	S11E22: "The Wishbone"
1966	Voyage to the Bottom of the Sea	Kruger, Crew Member	Season 3 Episode 7: "Deadly Waters"
1967	Straightaway		Episode: "Crossroad"
1967	Lost in Space	Commander Fletcher	Season 3 Episode: "Flight into the Future"
1967	The Time Tunnel	Vokar	Season 2 Episode: "Chase Through Time"
