= Marilyn Hassett =

American screen and television actress (born 1947)

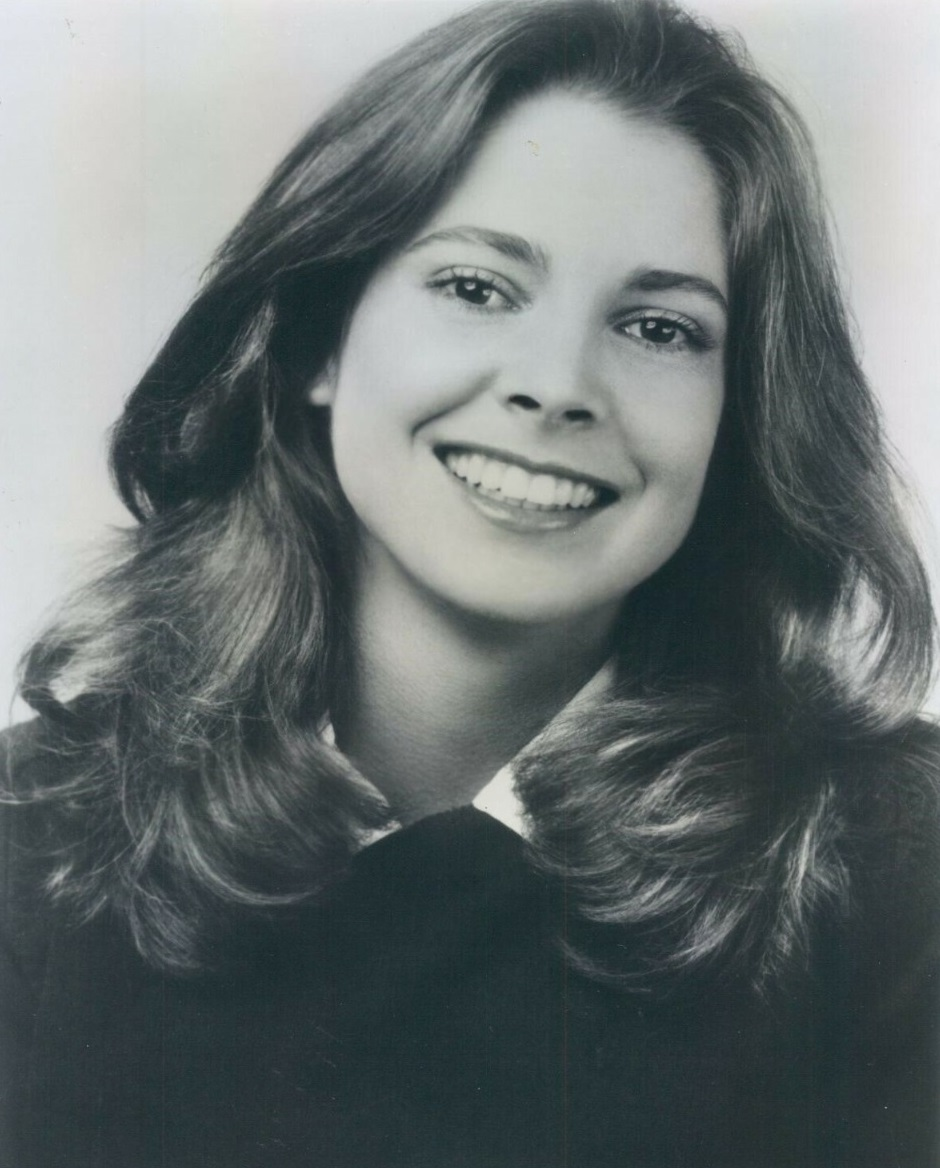
- Marilyn Hassett
- Born: Marilyn Hassett; December 17, 1947 (age 78); Los Angeles, California, U.S.
- Occupation: Actress
- Years active: 1969–2008
- Known for: Jill Kinmont on The Other Side of the Mountain
- Spouse: Larry Peerce (divorced)
- Awards: Golden Globe Award for New Star of the Year - Actress

Marilyn Hassett (born December 17, 1947) is an American actress. She is best known for playing the role of Jill Kinmont in the romance drama film The Other Side of the Mountain (1975) for which she received Golden Globe Awards and its sequel The Other Side of the Mountain Part 2 (1978). Hassett also starred in films Shadow of the Hawk (1976) and The Bell Jar (1979).

== Life and career ==
Hassett was born in Los Angeles, California. She first appeared in a bit role in the 1969 drama film They Shoot Horses, Don't They? and the following year co-starred in the ABC Movie of the Week Quarantined. Hassett later guest-starred on Emergency!, The Six Million Dollar Man and Movin' On.

In 1975, Hassett starred as ski racing champion Jill Kinmont in the drama film The Other Side of the Mountain (1975), which was directed by Larry Peerce, who chose her for the lead from several hundred hopefuls. She received some positive reviews from critics; she won a Golden Globe in 1976 for New Star of the Year and was nominated for the Golden Globe Award for Best Actress in a Motion Picture – Drama. The Other Side of the Mountain was one of the more successful box-office releases for Universal Pictures in years and helped the company survive a difficult period. In 1978, the studio released its sequel The Other Side of the Mountain Part 2.

Hassett starred alongside Jan-Michael Vincent in the 1976 cult classic film Shadow of the Hawk, and the same year, she appeared in Two-Minute Warning, directed by her then-husband Larry Peerce. In 1979, she starred in the film adaptation of Sylvia Plath's novel The Bell Jar, also directed by Peerce. The film was not well received. The following years, Hassett appeared in a number of smaller-scale movies and guest-starred on television series, including Hotel, Murder, She Wrote and The Hitchhiker.

== Filmography ==
Film
Year	Title	Role	Notes
1969	They Shoot Horses, Don't They?	Dancer	uncredited
1975	The Other Side of the Mountain	Jill Kinmont	Golden Globe Award for New Star of the Year – Actress; Nominated - Golden Globe Award for Best Actress in a Motion Picture – Drama
1976	Shadow of the Hawk	Maureen	
1976	Two-Minute Warning	Lucy	
1978	The Other Side of the Mountain: Part II	Jill Kinmont	
1979	The Bell Jar	Esther Greenwood	
1984	Massive Retaliation	Lois Fredericks	
1986	The Eleventh Commandment	Edie	
1987	Body Count	Joanne Knight	
1988	Messenger of Death	Josephine Fabrizio	
1989	Rock-a-Die Baby	Mom	
1991	Twenty Dollar Star	Lou Ann	
1992	Inside Out III	Cindy	segment "The Houseguest"
1992	Exiled in America	Beverly	
2008	Kid Pound	Miss Rebecca	Short
2008	Bad High	Mary Miller	Short

=== Television ===
Year	Title	Role	Notes
1972	Emergency!	Nurse (uncredited); Cynthia	Episode: "Dealer's Wild"; Episode: "Dilemma"
1974	The Six Million Dollar Man	Car Rental Girl (as Marilyn J. Hassett)	Episode: "Eyewitness to Murder"
1974	Movin' On	Mary Kate	Episode: "The Trick Is to Stay Alive"
1975	The Family Holvak	Carolyn Scovell	Episode: "The Wedding"
1984	Hotel	Joanne Maxwell	Episode: "Encores"
1984	The Fisher Family		Episode: "Jimmy"
1986	The Hitchhiker	Jill McGinnis	Episode: "Man of Her Dreams"
1984-1988	Murder, She Wrote	Maggie Earl; Patricia Harlan; Barbara Blair	Episode: "Deadly Lady"; Episode: "Witness for the Defense"; Episode: "Deadpan"
1990	Shades of LA	Melisa	Episode: "The Teacher from Hell"

== Awards and nominations ==
Year	Award	Category	Nominated work	Result
1976	33rd Golden Globe Awards	Golden Globe Award for New Star of the Year - Actress	The Other Side of the Mountain	Won
1976	33rd Golden Globe Awards	Golden Globe Award for Best Actress in a Motion Picture - Drama	The Other Side of the Mountain	Nominated
