= The Other Side of the Mountain Part 2 =

1978 American biographical film

- Directed by: Larry Peerce
- Written by: Douglas Day Stewart
- Produced by: Edward S. Feldman
- Starring: Marilyn Hassett; Timothy Bottoms
- Cinematography: Ric Waite
- Edited by: Walter Hennemann; Eve Newman
- Music by: Lee Holdridge
- Production companies: Universal Pictures; Filmways
- Distributed by: Universal Pictures
- Release date: February 10, 1978
- Running time: 100 minutes
- Country: United States
- Language: English
- Box office: $11,565,678

The Other Side of the Mountain Part 2 is a 1978 film directed by Larry Peerce. It stars Marilyn Hassett and Timothy Bottoms. It is a sequel to The Other Side of the Mountain.

== Plot ==
Jill Kinmont, now recovered, goes to Southern California, where she meets and falls in love with a man named John Boothe. They later learn that they have more to deal with than just a new romance.

== Cast ==
- Marilyn Hassett as Jill Kinmont
- Timothy Bottoms as John Boothe
- Nan Martin as June Kinmont
- Belinda Montgomery as Audra Jo Nicholson
- Gretchen Corbett as Linda Mae Myers
- William Bryant as Bill Kinmont
- James A. Bottoms as Dudley Boothe
- June Dayton as Alice Boothe
- Charles Frank as Mel
- George Petrie as Los Angeles Doctor
- Tom Jordan as Bob Kinmont
- Myron Healey as Bishop Doctor
- Steve Conte as Wrangler

== Production ==
The Other Side of the Mountain Part 2 was filmed on location in Los Angeles, California, Bishop, California, and Victoria, British Columbia.

== Reception ==
Vincent Canby of The New York Times was not impressed: "The first film, directed by Larry Peerce, who also directed the spinoff, was a slickly prefabricated bathtub of movie sentimentality, at the heart of which was a gallant young woman facing real handicaps. Part II is really a 30-minute postscript to that story, blown up to feature-length by artificial plot problems and so many flashbacks to the first movie that the second becomes a sort of reverse trailer, a coming attraction for something that's already gone. ... Mr. Peerce's direction suggests a certain amount of desperation. You can almost hear him asking, 'What can I do to make things interesting?'" Variety wrote that the film was "basically a love story, complete with hokum and a degree in implausibility." Gene Siskel of the Chicago Tribune gave the film two stars out of four and wrote, "The second time we're asked to cry for Kinmont, in The Other Side of the Mountain—Part 2, we are being exploited. That's because the sequel wears its heart on its sleeve. It has only one emotion: pity." Kevin Thomas of the Los Angeles Times wrote, "This sequel presented an opportunity for Peerce and his new writer Douglas Day Stewart to make amends by depicting the extreme difficulties Miss Kinmont encountered in finding a school system that would accept her once she completed her education. But no, another chance to strike a much-needed blow for handicapped people's liberation was again passed up in favor of concentrating solely on Miss Kinmont's struggle within herself to dare to accept the love of a man." Gary Arnold of The Washington Post wrote that the film "doesn't match or enhance the inspirational impact of its predecessor" and found Timothy Bottoms "a sad comedown from Beau Bridges" as the love interest.
