= The Other Side of the Mountain =

1975 American biographical film

- Theatrical release poster
- Directed by: Larry Peerce
- Screenplay by: David Seltzer
- Based on: A Long Way Up: The Story of Jill Kinmont by E. G. Valens
- Produced by: Edward S. Feldman
- Starring: Marilyn Hassett; Beau Bridges; Belinda J. Montgomery; Nan Martin; Dabney Coleman; Bill Vint; William Bryant
- Cinematography: David M. Walsh
- Edited by: Eve Newman
- Music by: Charles Fox
- Production company: Filmways Pictures
- Distributed by: Universal Pictures
- Release dates: July 25, 1975 (San Jose); November 14, 1975 (New York City)
- Running time: 103 minutes
- Country: United States
- Language: English
- Box office: $34,673,100

The Other Side of the Mountain is a 1975 American drama romance film based on the true story of ski racing champion Jill Kinmont. The film was titled A Window to the Sky in the United Kingdom.

In early 1955, Kinmont was the national champion in slalom, and was a top U.S. prospect for a medal in the 1956 Winter Olympics, a year away. She was paralyzed in a near-fatal giant slalom accident at the Snow Cup in Alta, Utah, weeks before her 19th birthday, leaving her quadriplegic. Jill Kinmont Boothe lived a further 57 years.

The film was directed by Larry Peerce, written by David Seltzer (based on the 1966 biography A Long Way Up by E. G. Valens) and stars Marilyn Hassett and Beau Bridges. It features the Academy Award for Best Original Song nominated theme song "Richard's Window" (composed by Charles Fox, lyrics by Norman Gimbel), sung by Olivia Newton-John.

A sequel, The Other Side of the Mountain Part 2, was released in 1978.

== Plot ==
Despite her confinement in a wheelchair, Jill Kinmont teaches at a Paiute/Shoshone Native American school in Bishop, California, where she has an informal relationship with her young students. During a field trip, they ask how she goes to the bathroom and whether she has a man in her life.

Jill remembers being on a high school ski team, led by coach Dave McCoy. She and fellow skier Audra Jo “A. J.” Nicholson, whom Jill also calls “Josie,” are best friends and hope someday to ski together in the Olympic Games. They and their fellow team member, Linda Meyers, are also fans of skier Dick “Mad Dog” Buek, famous for his daredevil exploits on the slopes. As they look at a magazine article about Dick, Linda claims she has a relationship with him. Later, during a ski competition, Jill has an accident during a descent and meets Dick, who gives her a quick lesson about not fighting gravity.

That summer, while Jill and A. J. work on Jill's family's guest ranch, the Rockin’ K, Jill wonders if she has a lucky life or whether she is using up her luck now. She notices A. J. in distress and when A. J. is taken to the hospital, she is diagnosed with polio and put into an “iron lung” to help her breathe. For the rest of the summer, Jill trains hard, believing she is competing for both herself and A. J.

One day, as Jill and Linda walk to school, they see Dick's airplane parked near Dave's house, and stop to see him. Hobbling on a crutch, Dick recognizes Jill and after she sends Linda on to school, she takes a daredevil ride with Dick in his airplane. Afterward, Jill asks Dick why he is so intent on killing himself and he responds that with his tenth-grade education and general worthlessness, he is no good to anybody.

That winter, Jill wins all her regional slalom races. She also becomes close to Wallace “Buddy” Werner, her male counterpart on the ski circuit, even though she still has feelings about Dick. One day, at a crowded ski lodge, Dick arrives with one arm in a sling and the other holding his new fiancée Sigrid Halvorson, which sends Jill running outside in tears, followed by Buddy, who comforts her. The two are later accepted to compete at the Snow Cap in Alta, Utah, whose winners will be top contenders for the U.S. team at the 1956 Winter Olympics in Cortina d'Ampezzo, Italy. They also begin a romantic relationship.

Before the competition, Dave walks Jill down the Snow Cap slalom course and points out that the middle section, called the Corkscrew, is dangerous. When Jill sees that her main competitor, Andrea “Andy” Mead Lawrence, slows down at the Corkscrew during practice runs, she determines to overtake her by skiing it faster. However, during the final race, Jill loses control and tumbles over a cliff. A medical team puts her in a basket, and she is transported to a Salt Lake City, Utah, hospital, where the staff puts her body in traction. Though Buddy assures Jill she is okay, Dr. Pittman explains that she has a broken neck and severed spinal cord, which will eventually fuse back together but not heal. She will be a quadriplegic for the rest of her life.

Nonetheless, Jill believes she will someday walk again and answers Buddy's love letters with assurances that she is fine. However, her friend A. J., now walking on crutches, visits and tells Jill she must accept herself as a “gimp” so that she can move on with her life. Jill responds with a front page interview in a Salt Lake City newspaper, announcing she will be well soon. She moves to a Los Angeles rehabilitation facility to begin intensive therapy, and regains some feeling in her fingers and arms.

By the time Buddy arrives to continue their courtship, Jill sits in a wheelchair, dressed in a gown with a bowl of potato chips in her lap. Alone together, Jill tells Buddy to sit across the room and watch her demonstration. He believes she is going to stand up and walk to him but instead, she dips her hand into the bowl and, with difficulty, gets hold of a potato chip and lifts it to her mouth. Seeing his disappointment, Jill admits she is never going to walk again. Buddy leaves and though he telephones her one more time, she never sees him again. Crushed, Jill gives up on therapy, until one day Dick arrives, puts her in her wheelchair, and, without permission, wheels her out of the facility and into the middle of a busy intersection, where he admonishes her for feeling sorry for herself.

When it is time for Jill to return home to Bishop, Dick flies her in his airplane and strafes the marching band greeting her at the airport. Dick stays for a while with her family and though Jill's father Bill Kinmont thinks he is too callous with her, her mother June Kinmont appreciates the way Dick encourages Jill to accept her condition. Dick declares his love and wants to marry her as soon as he can afford to build her a house but Jill says she doubts she can make love because she has no feelings below her chest.

One day, as Jill and Dick park near Bishop's Paiute/Shoshone reservation, a bell rings nearby and Jill tells Dick it is the local Indian school. As they drive through the impoverished reservation, Jill wonders why people stay there. She says there are never enough teachers for the kids because the reservation pays very little. Later, Dick returns home but promises to soon rejoin her. Jill is sent to another rehabilitation center, where she rejoins A. J. and makes several new friends, including Cookie and Lee Zadroga. They deride any sign of false hope or sympathy from outsiders and laugh when Jill says she wants to study for a teaching certificate.

Jill takes classes at a university and in her spare time she teaches the younger kids at her rehabilitation facility. One day, after Matt, one of the kids, wishes she were his real teacher, Jill tells her dean that she wants to earn a teaching certificate. He patronizes her and when she insists on being a teacher, he states that “paraplegics are unacceptable” at schools, so there is no point in her getting a certificate. Jill defies him by applying at the reservation and getting a job. She calls Dick, tells him she accepts his offer of marriage and asks him to return to Bishop for her birthday. Dick agrees but never shows up, despite having left the airport two days earlier. A telephone call from Dick's father delivers the tragic news that Dick was killed in a plane crash. Jill is shocked, then cries.

Returning to the present, Rory, an Indian student, asks if she will ever get married. She says she is lucky, remembering Dick's words that anybody whose absence makes someone sad is lucky. Jill wheels toward the school with her students walking alongside her.

== Cast ==
- Marilyn Hassett as Jill Kinmont
- Beau Bridges as Dick "Mad Dog" Buek
- Belinda J. Montgomery as Audra Jo "A. J." Nicholson
- Nan Martin as June Kinmont
- Bill Vint as Buddy Werner
- Dabney Coleman as Dave McCoy
- William Bryant as Bill Kinmont
- Hampton Fancher as Lee Zadroga
- William Roerick as Dr. Pittman
- Dori Brenner as Cookie
- Walter Brooke as Dean
- Jocelyn Jones as Linda Meyers
- Greg Mabrey as Bob Kinmont
- Tony Becker as Jerry Kinmont
- Griffin Dunne as Herbie Johnson
- Joan Dykman as Sigrid Halvorson
- Brad Savage as Matt
- Harold Clarke Jr. as Rory

== Release ==
The Other Side of the Mountain was one of the most successful box office releases for Universal Pictures in years and was said to have helped the company survive a difficult period.

== Reception ==
The film earned North American theatrical rentals of $8.2 million.

Vincent Canby of The New York Times said: "The life came first, but the movie seems to have less interest in Miss Kinmont than in the devices of romantic fiction that reduce particularity of feeling to a sure-fire formula designed to elicit sentimental purposes. If you go to see The Other Side of the Mountain, load up your handkerchiefs and leave your wits at home." Gene Siskel of the Chicago Tribune gave the film two-and-a-half stars out of four and wrote, "If a real person weren't involved, I'd feel more at ease saying this film is excessive in its grab for sympathy and admiration ... Bridges' natural charm brightens not only Kinmont's spirit but also the spirit of a movie that dangerously leans toward the maudlin." Variety wrote, "Film is a standout in every department, perfect casting, fine acting, sensitive photography and general overall production all combining to give unusual strength to subject matter." Kevin Thomas of the Los Angeles Times called it "a surefire formula tearjerker" whose most serious flaw was "the film's emphasis on the ordeal of Miss Kinmont's rehabilitation, which after all is a familiar enough but oh so heart-tugging process, at the expense of detailing her very struggle to do something useful with her life once she has learned to accept she will never again walk." Gary Arnold of The Washington Post wrote that the film "stands a good chance of becoming the next legitimate sleeper. In certain respects it's a superficial, banal piece of filmmaking, but the story it tries to tell has stirring and inspirational qualities, which cannot be found in any other American films at the moment." Tom Milne of The Monthly Film Bulletin wrote, "Though the facts may be facts, everything else is crocodile tears and spurious uplift, from the coy prologue in which the heroine tells her story to a winsome pack of children asking why she never got married, to the bitter-sweet ending (complete with drooling pop song) which would have given even a Victorian chambermaid qualms with its breathless heaping of darkest hours before the dawn."

== Awards and nominations ==
Award	Category	Nominee(s)	Result	Ref.
Academy Awards	Best Original Song	"Richard's Window"; Music by Charles Fox; Lyrics by Norman Gimbel	Nominated	
Golden Globe Awards	Best Actress in a Motion Picture – Drama	Marilyn Hassett	Nominated	
Golden Globe Awards	Best Acting Debut in a Motion Picture – Female	Marilyn Hassett	Won	
Golden Globe Awards	Best Original Score – Motion Picture	Charles Fox	Nominated	
Golden Globe Awards	Best Original Song – Motion Picture	"Richard's Window"; Music by Charles Fox; Lyrics by Norman Gimbel	Nominated	

== See also ==
- List of American films of 1975
