= The Neon Empire =

- Genre: Drama
- Written by: Pete Hamill; Edward Anhalt
- Directed by: Larry Peerce
- Starring: Ray Sharkey; Linda Fiorentino; Dylan McDermott; Julie Carmen; Harry Guardino; Martin Landau; Gary Busey
- Music by: Lalo Schifrin
- Country of origin: United States
- Original language: English

Production
- Executive producer: Charles W. Fries
- Producer: Richard Maynard
- Production locations: Eloy, Arizona; Casa Grande, Arizona; Coolidge, Arizona; Florence, Arizona
- Cinematography: Gerald Hirschfeld
- Editor: Bob Wyman
- Running time: 3hr. 6min.
- Production companies: Fries Entertainment; Richard Maynard Productions

Original release
- Network: Showtime
- Release: December 3, 1989

The Neon Empire is a 1989 American television crime-drama miniseries directed by Larry Peerce and starring Ray Sharkey and Linda Fiorentino. It originally aired on two consecutive nights (December 3 and 4, 1989) on Showtime.

== Plot ==
Junior Morloff, a Jewish gangster, is traveling out west when he comes across Las Vegas, a small town at the time. Surprised that gambling is legal there, he gets an idea to build a casino.

== Cast ==
- Ray Sharkey as Junior Molov
- Linda Fiorentino as Lucy
- Gary Busey as Frank Weston
- Dylan McDermott as Victor "Vic"
- Martin Landau as Max
- Julie Carmen as Miranda
- Harry Guardino as Nick
- Michael Zelniker as Burt Stone
- Richard Brooks as Tampa
- Andreas Katsulas as Vito
- Dale Dye as Chief Bates
- Tyra Ferrell as Samantha
- Natalia Nogulich as Mildred
