= Lillian Gallo =

American television producer (1928–2012)

- Born: Lillian Drazek; April 12, 1928; Springfield, Massachusetts, U.S.
- Died: June 6, 2012 (aged 84); Woodland Hills, Los Angeles, California, U.S.
- Occupation: Television producer
- Years active: 1972-1998
- Spouse: Lew Gallo (m. 1958; died 2000)
- Children: 2

Lillian Drazek Gallo (April 12, 1928 – June 6, 2012) was an American television producer. In the 1970s, Gallo formed one of the first female producing collaborations in Hollywood when she teamed with screenwriter Fay Kanin.

== Life and career ==
Gallo was born Lillian Drazek in Springfield, Massachusetts, on April 12, 1928, to parents who immigrated from Poland. She graduated with a bachelor's degree in journalism from the University of Michigan in 1949. Gallo served in the United States Marine Corps for four years after graduation, including work in the Pentagon and achieving the rank of captain.

She moved to Los Angeles during the 1950s, where she worked on The Frank Sinatra Show. She soon met a producer at 20th Century Fox Television, William Self, who became her professional mentor at the studio. Gallo began work on television series for 20th Century Fox during the 1960s, including Batman and Peyton Place.

Gallo rose to become the director of movies of the weekend, known as ABC Movie of the Week, for the ABC television network. She oversaw the production of more than twenty-four television films aired on ABC, including Duel in 1971, which marked Steven Spielberg's debut as a feature film directing debut.

In 1974, Gallo produced the television film, The Stranger Who Looks Like Me, which starred Meredith Baxter. Baxter's character, who had been adopted as a child, searches for her biological parents in the movie. Gallo followed this up by producing the 1975 TV movie, Hustling, which earned its lead, Jill Clayburgh, an Emmy nomination for playing a prostitute.

Gallo teamed with screenwriter, Fay Kanin, in 1978, becoming one of the industry's first all-female production partnerships. Together, Gallo and Kanin produced only one film, Fun and Games in 1980, which starred Valerie Harper. Despite having only one single production credit, Gallo's and Kanin's partnership proved significant in an industry long dominated by men. Author Mollie Gregory, who has written on the history of female producers, told the Los Angeles Times, "Though they enjoyed working together, they were really bucking the times...Lillian told me that people found it shocking to be on the set with two women producers."

She continued to produce television movies throughout the 1980s and 1990s, including Princess Daisy in 1983. Gallo's last credit as executive producer was for the 1998 television film, I Know What You Did, starring Rosanna Arquette as a lawyer.

Gallo's husband of 42 years, producer and actor Lew Gallo, died in 2000. Lillian Gallo died at the Motion Picture & Television Country House and Hospital in Woodland Hills, Los Angeles, of complications from Alzheimer's disease on June 6, 2012, at the age of 84. She was survived by two children, Mary Ann and Tom, and two grandchildren. Her funeral was held at the Church of the Good Shepherd in Beverly Hills, California. She was a longtime resident of Beverly Hills.
