= Edward S. Feldman =

American film and television producer (1929–2020)

- Born: September 5, 1929; New York City, New York, U.S.
- Died: October 2, 2020 (aged 91); Los Angeles, California, U.S.
- Education: Michigan State University
- Occupations: Film producer, television producer

Edward S. Feldman (September 5, 1929 – October 2, 2020) was an American film and television producer. He was nominated for an Academy Award for Best Picture for Witness (1985). He was also a two-time BAFTA Award and a two-time Primetime Emmy Award nominee.

== Early life and education ==
Born and raised in The Bronx, where he attended DeWitt Clinton High School, Feldman graduated from Michigan State University, after which he was hired by 20th Century Fox to work as a writer in the studio's press book department in its Manhattan headquarters. He quickly rose within the ranks, becoming the contact for fan magazines, then trade papers, and finally the New York City press. His employment at Fox was interrupted by a two-year stint with the United States Air Force, during which he was stationed at the Dover Air Force Base in Delaware. His commanding officer expected him to use his skills as a publicist to get him promoted from colonel to general, a task Feldman completed successfully before he returned to civilian life.

== Career ==
In 1959, Feldman left Fox to promote The World of Suzie Wong and its producer, Ray Stark, for Paramount Pictures. His assignment began with location shooting in Hong Kong and ended with the release of the film. He clashed with Stark throughout the production, which prompted him to resign from Paramount and join Embassy Pictures as the head of advertising and publicity. Two years later, Stark invited him to join him at Seven Arts Productions, where his first project was the controversial screen adaptation of Lolita. Due to Feldman's intervention, the Catholic Legion of Decency agreed not to rate the film "condemned" if the studio would enforce a rule banning anyone under the age of eighteen from theaters showing it. Once Seven Arts acquired Warner Bros., Feldman relocated to Hollywood, where he remained with Warner Bros.-Seven Arts for two years, during which time he became active in film production.

Because of his association with Stark, son-in-law of comedian Fanny Brice, Feldman handled advertising and publicity for the Broadway production of Funny Girl throughout its run.

Feldman's first credit as a film producer was the 1971 melodrama What's the Matter with Helen? starring Debbie Reynolds and Shelley Winters. Additional credits include Save the Tiger, The Other Side of the Mountain, Two-Minute Warning, The Last Married Couple in America, Hot Dog...The Movie, Witness, The Golden Child, Wired, Green Card, The Doctor, Forever Young, the live-action The Jungle Book, the live-action 101 Dalmatians and its sequel, 102 Dalmatians, The Truman Show, and K-19: The Widowmaker.

In 1984, Edward S. Feldman teamed up with entertainment attorney Charles R. Meeker to start out The Feldman/Meeker Co. (aka FM Entertainment) in order to self-finance and make three-youth oriented films annually and the development of network and television projects.

For television, Feldman produced several films and miniseries, including Moon of the Wolf, Charles & Diana: A Royal Love Story, and 21 Hours at Munich and King, both of which earned him Emmy Award nominations. He also was one of the producers of the short-lived series Flamingo Road.

Feldman was nominated for the Academy Award for Best Picture for Witness and the BAFTA Award for Best Film for Witness and The Truman Show. In 2001, the Hollywood Film Festival honored him for Outstanding Achievement in Producing.

Feldman died on October 2, 2020, in Los Angeles.

== Filmography ==
=== Film ===
Producer

- The Other Side of the Mountain (1975)
- Two-Minute Warning (1976)
- The Other Side of the Mountain Part 2 (1978)
- The Last Married Couple in America (1980)
- The Sender (1982)
- Hot Dog…The Movie (1984)
- Witness (1985)
- Explorers (1985)
- The Golden Child (1986)
- Wired (1989)
- Honey, I Blew Up the Kid (1992)
- The Jungle Book (1994)
- The Truman Show (1998)
- 102 Dalmatians (2000)
- K-19: The Widowmaker (2002)

Executive producer

- What's the Matter with Helen? (1971)
- Fuzz (1972)
- Save the Tiger (1973)
- Six Pack (1982)
- The Hitcher (1986)
- Hamburger: The Motion Picture (1986)
- Near Dark (1987)
- Green Card (1990)
- The Doctor (1991)
- Forever Young (1992)
- My Father the Hero (1992)
- 101 Dalmatians (1996)

Acting roles

Year	Title	Role	Notes
1984	Hot Dog…The Movie	Man in Bar Watching Wet T-shirt Contest	Uncredited
1990	Green Card	Taxi Driver	
1992	Honey, I Blew Up the Kid	Las Vegas Couple	
1985	Witness	Tour Bus Guide	

Miscellaneous crew

Year	Title	Role
1981	One from the Heart	Production representative

=== Television ===
Executive producer

Year	Title	Notes
1972	Moon of the Wolf	Television film
1973	Pioneer Woman	Television film
1974	The Stranger Who Looks Like Me	Television film
1975	My Father's House	Television film
1976	21 Hours at Munich	Television film
1976	Smash-Up on Interstate 5	Television film
1978	King	
1979	Valentine	Television film
1981	300 Miles for Stephanie	Television film
1982	Charles & Diana: A Royal Love Story	Television film
1982	Not in Front of the Children	Television film
1985	Obsessed with a Married Woman	Television film
1985	Midas Valley	Television film
