= Two-Minute Warning =

1976 film by Larry Peerce

- Theatrical release poster
- Directed by: Larry Peerce
- Screenplay by: Edward Hume
- Based on: Two-Minute Warning; 1975 novel by George LaFountaine
- Produced by: Edward S. Feldman
- Starring: Charlton Heston; John Cassavetes; Martin Balsam; Beau Bridges
- Cinematography: Gerald Hirschfeld
- Edited by: Walter Hannemann; Eve Newman
- Music by: Charles Fox
- Production company: Filmways
- Distributed by: Universal Pictures
- Release date: November 12, 1976 (US)
- Running time: 115 minutes
- Country: United States
- Language: English
- Budget: $6.7 million

Two-Minute Warning is a 1976 action thriller film directed by Larry Peerce and starring Charlton Heston, John Cassavetes, Martin Balsam, Beau Bridges, Jack Klugman, Gena Rowlands, and David Janssen. It was based on the novel of the same name written by George LaFountaine. The film was nominated for an Academy Award for Best Film Editing.

== Plot ==
An unknown sniper positions himself at the Los Angeles Memorial Coliseum before a professional football championship dubbed "Championship X" (Ten) between Baltimore and Los Angeles, similar to the Super Bowl. He is spotted by a Goodyear Blimp camera. Police and a SWAT team are immediately called in by stadium manager Sam McKeever. Police Captain Peter Holly, working with SWAT team Sergeant Chris Button, devises a plan to capture the sniper before the conclusion of the game.

Many of the fans attending the game are introduced. They include Steve and Janet, an argumentative middle-aged couple; Stu Sandman, a gambling addict; a Catholic priest, who is a friend of quarterback Charlie Tyler; young married couple Mike and Peggy Ramsay; an elderly pickpocket and his young accomplice; and football fan Al, who begins flirting with Lucy when he notices her date is more interested in the game than in her.

The stadium's maintenance director, Paul, discovers the sniper's presence and attempts to confront him. The sniper strikes Paul with the butt of his rifle and, undetected by fans, causes him to fall several stories, leaving him severely injured. SWAT team members position themselves on stadium light towers to take aim on the sniper's nest. The sniper kills two of the SWAT marksmen, but a third one coolly waits for a clear shot and hits the sniper's arm and neck area, seriously injuring him. Mike spots the sniper with his binoculars and reports it to the police, who question Mike suspiciously and physically overpower him.

Shortly after the game's two-minute warning, the SWAT team is given the green light to go after the sniper. Seeing that he is surrounded, the sniper opens fire, shooting randomly into the crowd. Many security men, Coliseum personnel, and spectators are killed or wounded. Many fleeing spectators are crushed or trampled underfoot while rushing towards exit tunnels. Steve, Stu, Chris, Peggy, and the pickpocket are among those shot (Chris and Peggy survive). Mike escapes from police custody during the riot and is reunited with Peggy and their children once the stadium empties of people. Ultimately, the sniper is shot by Peter who, along with Chris, and other members of the SWAT team, arrest him.

Searching through his wallet, the officers learn the sniper's name: Carl Cook; he dies while in custody, revealing nothing about his intent. Chris points out that although they know nothing about Cook, over the next few weeks the media, via newspapers and television, will discover all the unknown details about Cook's life, including the body count, and question why the officers had to kill him.

== Cast ==
- Charlton Heston as Captain Peter Holly
- John Cassavetes as Sergeant Chris Button
- Martin Balsam as Sam McKeever
- Beau Bridges as Mike Ramsay
- Marilyn Hassett as Lucy
- David Janssen as Steve
- Jack Klugman as Stu Sandman
- Gena Rowlands as Janet
- Walter Pidgeon as The Pickpocket
- Brock Peters as Paul
- David Groh as Al
- Mitchell Ryan as The Priest
- Joe Kapp as Charlie Tyler
- Pamela Bellwood as Peggy Ramsay
- Jon Korkes as Jeffrey
- Allan Miller as Mr. Green
- Andy Sidaris as TV Director
- Juli Bridges as The Pickpocket's Accomplice
- Warren Miller as Carl Cook / The Sniper
- William Bryant as Lieutenant Calloway
- J. A. Preston as Policeman
- Robert Ginty as Vendor
- Harry Northup as Lieber, S.W.A.T. Team Member
- Tom Bower as Decker, S.W.A.T. Team Member
- Asher Brauner as McCoy, S.W.A.T. Team Member
- Carmen Argenziano as Jennings, S.W.A.T. Team Member
- Larry Manetti as Pratt, S.W.A.T. Team Member
- Howard Cosell, Frank Gifford, and Dick Enberg as themselves
- Merv Griffin as himself
- Joanna Pettet (TV version only) (uncredited)
- Branscombe Richmond as Bystander with Blood on His Hands (uncredited)
- Susan Backlinie as Pretty Blonde Woman in Crowd (uncredited)

== Production ==
When released in 1976, Two-Minute Warning was promoted as an entry into the disaster film genre, complete with an all-star cast attempting to survive an immense riot created by the sniper. Joe Kapp, a former NFL quarterback for the Minnesota Vikings and Boston Patriots, plays Baltimore's veteran quarterback Charlie Tyler. It has been claimed that John Cassavetes and Gena Rowlands participated in order to obtain funding for Cassavetes' 1977 film, Opening Night.

The game footage for the full stadium shots of the Los Angeles Coliseum was from the Pac-8 college football game between Stanford and USC, played on November 8, 1975. The rest of the film was shot over three months in early 1976. The production employed thousands of background performers, several of whom sustained minor injuries while filming a stampede sequence. At one point, Peerce publicly complained about the performances of the extras, leading to rebukes from an extra who had worked on the film, who complained about on-set conditions, and a leader of the Screen Extras Guild, which represented a number of the performers.

The National Football League refused to allow the film to use any real team names.

== Release ==
The film was set to be released on July 30, 1976, reportedly to place it well in advance of the similarly themed Black Sunday, but it was later pushed back to November 12.

Two-Minute Warning reportedly performed poorly at the box office. Universal shot 63 additional minutes that make the sniper only a diversion to allow the theft of a multimillion‐dollar art collection from a nearby museum at a cost of $500,000. At the time, TV Networks paid $2.5 million and $5 million in licensing for films so the decision was made to shoot enough footage to extend the film to acquire a higher license fee from the networks.

Universal Studios devised a gimmick where moviegoers were not allowed to enter the theater at the moment the football game's two-minute warning began in the film.

== Television version ==
Due to the film's explicit violence and uncomfortable detail of a homicidal sniper acting alone and without apparent motivation, NBC negotiated with Universal Studios to film additional scenes for its television premiere in 1978.

The new scenes would detail an art theft, with the sniper serving as a decoy so robbers could escape without detection. The additional scenes, totaling 40 minutes in length, were added for the film's TV showing while 45 minutes of the original version were removed. Director Larry Peerce disowned the TV version, which credits editor Gene Palmer as director, and Francesca Turner as writer. Both Palmer and Turner were involved in the creation of the television version of 1974's Earthquake (where the film was expanded by 30 minutes in order to show it over two nights). Turner also helped doctor David Lynch's Dune for TV for the "teleplay". When shown on network television, this version of Two-Minute Warning is often shown rather than the original theatrical release. The television version previously had never been released to video and DVD; however it did finally appear as an extra on the Blu-ray from Shout! Factory on June 28, 2016.

== Critical reception ==
Two-Minute Warning received negative reviews from critics, as it holds a 29% rating on Rotten Tomatoes from 14 reviews.

Roger Ebert gave the film a rating of one star out of four, writing, "I knew going in what the movie was about (few films have such blunt premises) and I knew Two-Minute Warning was supposed to be a thriller, not a social statement. But I thought perhaps the movie would at least include a little pop sociology to soften its blood-letting. Not a chance. It's a cheerfully unashamed exploitation of two of our great national preoccupations, pro football and guns." Richard Eder of The New York Times wrote that since the viewer is told nothing about the sniper's character, "the efforts of the police to catch the sniper—all their ladder-climbing and maneuvering—are no more exciting than watching a group of linesmen at work up a telephone pole." Gene Siskel of the Chicago Tribune gave the film two stars out of four and wrote, "I'm sure the fast-buck artists who made this film justify it as a mirror of society and its faceless killers. But that's just an excuse to make a picture that will hold appeal only for those who like to see other people blown away by high-powered rifles. This is a contemptible motion picture." Arthur D. Murphy of Variety noted "above-average plotting, acting and direction, including one of the better mob scenes filmed in many a year." Kevin Thomas of the Los Angeles Times called it "a taut and terrific thriller" and "an example of superb film craftsmanship." Gary Arnold of The Washington Post called it "a middling suspense thriller" with characters "so sketchy and arbitrary that the victims and survivors might as well be determined by flips of the coin."

== See also ==
- List of American football films
