= Slope side =

Ski lodging terminology

In North American ski lodging, slope side is accommodation "on the slopes", within walking distance from the ski lifts. Such lodgings are usually at the bottom of, or right beside, the ski hill—hence the term slope side. It is also sometimes called "ski in, ski out" lodging.

Due to their proximity to the lifts, and their desirability, slope side units are usually more expensive than off-hill units. Slope side accommodation is desirable for a number of reasons, mainly:

- Driving and parking a car at many ski resorts is inconvenient and time-consuming. By being slope side, it is possible to avoid the inconvenience and have quicker access to the ski hill.
- Skiers staying in slope side lodgings can return to their rooms more easily for a break, or, with kitchen-equipped lodging, to cook and eat lunch.
- Those who have finished skiing for the day may return easily without disrupting those who may have accompanied them.

Adding slopeside lodging can make a ski resort more appealing to travelers.

Some resorts, such as Mont-Tremblant in Quebec, Sun Peaks Resort and Whistler-Blackcomb in British Columbia, feature pedestrian villages at the base of their mountains. Lodgings within these villages are considered slope side by the resorts, as the lifts are within walking distance of each unit.

In some cases, the slope side designation is used to describe hotels from which a shuttle bus is required to reach the hill. This is generally seen as stretching the term beyond what may be considered reasonable.

In European Alpine ski areas, especially in France, most of the resorts are 'slopeside', purposely built on the Alpine meadows to be entirely "ski in, ski out". Resort towns on the slopes are here referred to as stations de ski (ski stations). The area where the slopes meet the resort is called front de neige (snow front). Smaller ski hills without lodging are called stades de neige (snow stadiums).
