= Walter Brooke =

American actor (1914–1986)

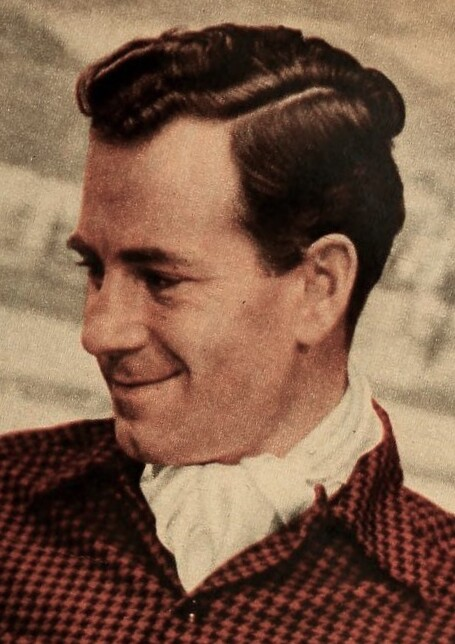
- Brooke in 1953
- Born: Gustav William Tweer Jr. October 23, 1914; New York City, U.S.
- Died: August 20, 1986 (aged 71); Los Angeles, California, U.S.
- Occupation: Actor
- Years active: 1941–1986
- Spouse: Elizabeth (Betty) Wragge
- Children: 2

Walter Brooke (born Gustav William Tweer Jr., October 23, 1914 – August 20, 1986) was an American actor.

== Career ==
Brooke's film career stretched from You're in the Army Now (1941) to Jagged Edge (1985). One of his best-remembered roles was that of Mr. McGuire, a friend of Benjamin Braddock's parents in The Graduate (1967), who confides one sacred word to young Benjamin: "Plastics."

Brooke portrayed District Attorney Frank Scanlon in the television series The Green Hornet. He also played Clarence Johnson in The Waltons, Walter Montgomery in Paradise Bay, Billy Herbert in One Man's Family, and Judge Howe in The Lawyers. Brooke appeared in three episodes of The Incredible Hulk as Mark Roberts, an editor for the fictional National Register. (The character of Mark Roberts first appeared in the Season 2 episode "Stop the Presses" and was played by actor Richard O' Brien.)

He played several naval officers in McHale's Navy and an unnamed district attorney in two episodes of Perry Mason: "The Case of the Floating Stones" in 1963, and "The Case of the Wrathful Wraith" in 1965. Brooke made guest appearances in four episodes of Mannix (1968–1974). He appeared on stage in the 1957 production of Hide and Seek at the Shubert Theatre in Washington, DC. During the 1970s he appeared in different roles in 4 episodes of The Rockford Files.

Brooke's Broadway credits include Hide and Seek (1957), Seagulls Over Sorrento (1952), Twilight Walk (1951), Two Blind Mice (1949), The Barber Had Two Sons (1943), and Romeo and Juliet (1940).

Brooke was active in the American Federation of Television and Radio Artists, serving as a director at both the local and national levels, and he served as an officer in Actor's Equity.

== Death ==
Brooke died from emphysema in Los Angeles on August 20, 1986, aged 71.

== Filmography ==
- They Died with Their Boots On (1941) - Cadet Rosser (uncredited)
- All Through the Night (1941) - Reporter (uncredited)
- You're in the Army Now (1941) - Clerk (uncredited)
- Captains of the Clouds (1942) - Duty Officer (uncredited)
- Bullet Scars (1942) - Trooper Walter Leary
- The Male Animal (1942) - Reporter (uncredited)
- Murder in the Big House (1942) - Reporter (uncredited)
- In This Our Life (1942) - Cab Driver (uncredited)
- Yankee Doodle Dandy (1942) - Reporter (uncredited)
- The Gay Sisters (1942) - Reporter (uncredited)
- Desperate Journey (1942) - Flight Sgt. Warwick (uncredited)
- The Iron Major (1943) - Lieutenant Stone (uncredited)
- C-Man (1949) - Joe (uncredited)
- Conquest of Space (1955) - Gen. Samuel T. Merritt
- The Party Crashers (1958) - Mr. Webster
- Bloodlust! (1961) - Dean Gerrard
- The Wonderful World of the Brothers Grimm (1962) - The Mayor ('The Cobbler and the Elves')
- Where Love Has Gone (1964) - Banker (uncredited)
- The Munsters (1965, "Yes, Galen, There is a Herman") - Mr. Stewart
- The Graduate (1967) - Mr. McGuire
- Yours, Mine and Ours (1968) - Howard Beardsley
- How Sweet It Is! (1968) - Haskell Wax
- Daddy's Gone A-Hunting (1969) - Jerry Wolfe
- Marooned (1969) - Network Commentator
- Zig Zag (1970) - Adam Mercer
- The Landlord (1970) - Mr. Enders
- Tora! Tora! Tora! (1970) - Captain Theodore Wilkinson
- Lawman (1971) - Luther Harris
- The Andromeda Strain (1971) - Assistant to Cabinet Secretary (uncredited)
- The Return of Count Yorga (1971) - Bill Nelson
- The Astronaut (1972) - Tom Everett
- One Little Indian (1973) - The Doctor
- Executive Action (1973) - Smythe
- Harrad Summer (1974) - Sam Grove
- Framed (1975) - Sen. Tatum
- The Other Side of the Mountain (1975) - Dean
- The Big Bus (1976) - Mr. Ames
- St. Ives (1976) - Mickey
- Fun with Dick and Jane (1977) - Mr. Weeks
- Black Sunday (1977) - Fowler
- Beyond Reason (1977) - Dr. Grovenor
- North Dallas Forty (1979) - Doctor
- The Nude Bomb (1980) - American Ambassador
- Separate Ways (1981) - Lawrence Stevens
- Hart to Hart (1981) - Carl Stevens
- Prince of the City (1981) - Judge (uncredited)
- Jagged Edge (1985) - Duane Bendix

== Television ==
- Cheyenne (1961) - Edward DeVier
- The Twilight Zone (1961) - Chad in Season 3 Episode 12: “The Jungle” (1963) - Dr. Raymond Gordon in Season 5 Episode 11: "A Short Drink from a Certain Fountain"
- The Wild Wild West (1967) - Prosecutor in Season 3 Episode 12: "The Night of the Legion of Death"
- Bonanza (1970) - "The Big Jackpot"
- Death Valley Days (1970) - Wesley Hull in Episode: "The Biggest Little Post Office in the World"
