= Jill Kinmont Boothe =

American alpine skier (1936–2012)

- Born: February 16, 1936; Los Angeles, California, U.S.
- Died: February 9, 2012 (aged 75); Carson City, Nevada
- Resting place: East Line Street Cemetery; Bishop, California
- Education: UCLA
- Occupation: educator
- Known for: ski racing, quadriplegia, tenacity
- Spouse: John G. Boothe (b.1941-2026) (m. 1976; died 2012)

Jill Kinmont Boothe (February 16, 1936 – February 9, 2012) was an American alpine ski racer and schoolteacher. Her life story was turned into two major Hollywood movies The Other Side of the Mountain and its sequel The Other Side of the Mountain Part 2.

Born in Los Angeles, California, Kinmont grew up in Bishop and learned to ski race at Mammoth Mountain in the Sierra Nevada mountains. In early 1955, she was the reigning national champion in the slalom, and a top prospect for a medal at the 1956 Winter Olympics, a year away.

At age 18, Kinmont competed in the giant slalom at the prestigious Snow Cup in Alta, Utah, on January 30, 1955. She suffered a near-fatal accident that resulted in paralysis from the shoulders down. That same week, she had been featured on the cover of Sports Illustrated magazine, dated January 31, 1955.

Kinmont was engaged to ski racer and "daredevil" Dick Buek (1929–1957) at the time of his death, according to her autobiography.

After her rehabilitation, she went on to graduate from UCLA with a B.A. in German and earned a teaching credential from the University of Washington in Seattle. She had a long career as an educator, first in Washington and then in Beverly Hills, California. She taught special education at Bishop Union Elementary School from 1975 to 1996 in her hometown of Bishop. She was an accomplished painter who had many exhibitions of her artwork.

Kinmont was the subject of two movies: The Other Side of the Mountain in 1975, and The Other Side of the Mountain Part 2 in 1978. Both films starred Marilyn Hassett as Kinmont.

Following "fifteen long days of incessant questioning and picture-taking" by reporter Janet Mason and photographer Burk Uzzle, LIFE published a 14-page photographic article in its 19 June 1964 issue about Jill's status nine years after the accident. Mason and Uzzle had a follow-up article about Kinmont eight years later in the 1 September 1972 issue of the same magazine. By then, she spent her summers back in Bishop teaching reading skills to the children of the Bishop Paiute Tribe and training tutors in the Indian reservation.

At age forty, she married trucker John Boothe of Bishop in November 1976, and they made their home in Bishop until shortly before her death.

Jill Boothe died February 9, 2012, at Carson Tahoe Regional Medical Center. The cause of death was not released, and a report that Boothe died of complications related to surgery was not confirmed by the coroner. She lived 57 years past her paralyzing ski accident and is buried in the East Line Street Cemetery in Bishop.

Boothe was inducted into the National Ski Hall of Fame in 1967. She received the Golden Plate Award of the American Academy of Achievement in 1973.
