= Court Martial (TV series) =

- Genre: Crime drama
- Starring: Bradford Dillman; Peter Graves; Angela Browne
- Theme music composer: Frank Cordell
- Country of origin: United Kingdom
- Original language: English
- No. of series: 1
- No. of episodes: 26 (list of episodes)

Production
- Executive producers: Robert Douglas; Bill Hill
- Production locations: Pinewood Studios, Iver Heath, Buckinghamshire, England, United Kingdom
- Running time: 60 minutes
- Production companies: ITC Entertainment; Roncom Films, Inc.

Original release
- Network: ATV Network (England); ABC (U.S.)
- Release: 8 January – 2 September 1966

Court Martial is a British crime drama TV series that premiered in 1966. It is an ITC Entertainment and Roncom Productions co-production.

== Premise ==
Set during World War II, the series details the investigations of a Judge Advocate General's office.

== Cast ==
=== Main cast ===
- Peter Graves....Major Frank Whittaker
- Bradford Dillman....Captain David Young
- Kenneth J. Warren....Master Sgt John MacCaskey
- Diane Clare.....Sgt Wendy

=== Guest cast ===
- Judi Dench
- Joan Hackett
- Dennis Hopper
- Sal Mineo

== Production ==
As the producers hoped for broadcast in the United States, Dillman and Graves's characters were American. The series ran for one 26-episode series, with each episode being 60 minutes. The series was shown on ABC in the United States and ITV in the UK. It won the 1966 British Society of Film and Television (later known as BAFTA) TV award for Best Dramatic Series.

The series had its genesis in a two-part episode of NBC's Kraft Suspense Theatre (also starring Peter Graves and Bradford Dillman), "The Case Against Paul Ryker" [10–17 October 1963], which was later re-edited into a 1968 theatrical feature, Sergeant Ryker.

Directors of individual episodes included Sam Wanamaker and British TV stalwart Peter Graham Scott.

== Episode list ==
1. "La Belle France"
2. "A Date with Celeste"
3. "Flight of the Tiger"
4. "No Wreath for an Angel"
5. "The Liberators"
6. "Operation Makeshift"
7. "Vengeance Is Mine"
8. "Without Spear or Word"
9. "Saviour of Vlarik"
10. "Where There Was No Echo"
11. "All Is a Dream to Me"
12. "The House Where He Lives"
13. "Let Slip the Dogs of War"
14. "Judge Them Gently"
15. "Operation Trojan Horse"
16. "Taps for the Sergeant"
17. "Redress of Wrongs"
18. "The Bitter Wind"
19. "Achilles Heel"
20. "All Roads Lead to Callaghan"
21. "Let No Man Speak"
22. "Silence Is the Enemy"
23. "How Ethical Can You Be"
24. "Shadow of a Man"
25. "The Logistics of Survival"
26. "Retreat from Life"
