= Marvin Mitchelson =

American lawyer (1928–2004)

Marvin M. Mitchelson (May 7, 1928 – September 18, 2004) was an American celebrity lawyer who pioneered the concept of palimony, calling it "marriage with no rings attached".

In 1993, he was disbarred after he was convicted of tax fraud and sentenced to 30 months in prison.

== Early life ==
Mitchelson was born in Detroit, Michigan, the youngest child of three and only son of poor Russian immigrants. The family relocated to Los Angeles when Marvin was in high school. After graduation, he served a term in the United States Navy. After leaving the service, he entered UCLA, where he earned a Bachelor of Arts degree. He obtained a Juris Doctor degree from Southwestern University School of Law, and was admitted to the State Bar of California on June 4, 1957. He had passed the bar exam on his second try. He then set up a private legal practice in Los Angeles.

== Legal career ==
In 1963, Mitchelson won a landmark United States Supreme Court decision, Douglas v. California, protecting indigent defendants' right to legal counsel.

He gained national publicity when he was hired by Michelle Triola, a lounge singer who lived with actor Lee Marvin as his romantic partner from 1964 until 1970, when Marvin told her to move out because he wanted to marry another woman. Mitchelson helped Triola—who claimed that she was entitled to the same benefits as a divorcée, which meant half of Marvin's then-$3.6 million fortune—win her right to bring suit. Although Triola was awarded $104,000 for "rehabilitation" in 1978, that ruling was overturned in 1981, and Marvin never paid Triola any money. Marvin v. Marvin (Triola assumed Marvin's name during the relationship) set a precedent.

Mitchelson's celebrity clients included Pamela Mason (wife of James Mason), who received a $2 million divorce settlement from her ex-husband, Robert De Niro, Mickey Rooney, Sylvester Stallone, Zsa Zsa Gabor, Joan Collins, Mel Tormé, Bianca Jagger, Soraya Kashoggi, Lesley-Anne Down, Carl Sagan, Mrs. William Shatner, and many ex-wives of errant playboy sheiks.

During his heyday, Mitchelson owned a 38-room Beverly Hills mansion and four Rolls-Royce automobiles. In his Century City office he had a chair owned by Rudolph Valentino and an illuminated ceiling of Botticelli's Venus which matched his belt buckle.

Mitchelson was quoted as saying, "A divorce lawyer is a chameleon with a law book."

== Rape allegations and tax fraud conviction ==
He was accused of rape by two women in the late 1980s, but the authorities declined to prosecute.

In 1993, he was convicted and sentenced to 30 months in prison of tax fraud for not paying income tax on his $2 million income. In 1994, he was cited for failing to take the professional responsibility exam, had his probation revoked in 1995, and was disciplined in 1996 for failure to provide accountings or return unearned fees in 14 client matters.

== Later life and death ==
Mitchelson was married to Italian-born actress Marcella Ferri.

Mitchelson died in a rehabilitation center in Beverly Hills, succumbing to cancer.

== In popular culture ==
He made a brief cameo appearance on The Golden Girls ("There Goes the Bride"); his role was as a lawyer for Stanley Zbornak, ex-husband of Dorothy Zbornak. In the episode, he produced a prenuptial agreement which Dorothy had to sign. She refused, and their remarriage was canceled.

Jeff Marlow portrays Mitchelson in the final two episodes of the 2022-23 HBO series Winning Time: The Rise of the Lakers Dynasty. Mitchelson represents Honey Kaplan, the fictionalized second wife of Los Angeles Lakers owner Jerry Buss.
