= Marvin v. Marvin =

1976 California Supreme Court case on separation of couples

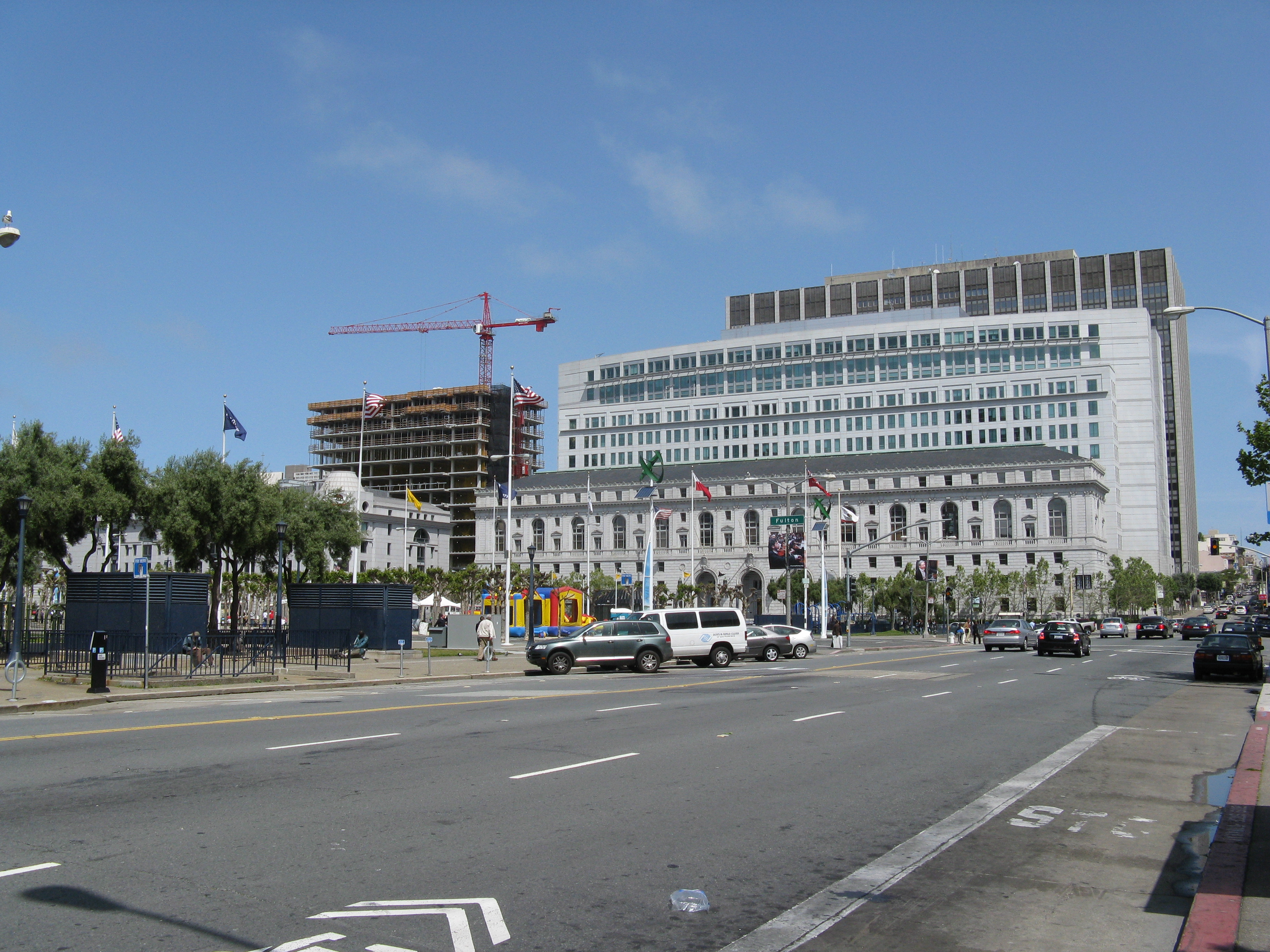
- Court: California Supreme Court
- Full case name: Michelle Marvin v. Lee Marvin
- Decided: December 27, 1976

Court membership
- Chief judge: Donald R. Wright
- Associate judges: Stanley Mosk Justice Mathew O. Tobriner Justice Frank C. Newman Justice Raymond L. Sullivan Justice Wiley W. Manuel Justice William P. Clark, Jr.

Marvin v. Marvin, 557 P.2d 106 (Cal. 1976), is a decision of the California Supreme Court concerning the separation of a non-married cohabitating couple. The California Supreme court awarded the plaintiff compensation and found that the defendant violated a verbal contract.

This case arose when the plaintiff Michelle Marvin and the defendant Lee Marvin separated. The defendant and plaintiff were in a relationship however they were unmarried but lived together for the extent of their relationship. Michelle Marvin assumed the defendant's last name to avoid ridicule and questioning from peers. During the relationship the plaintiff assumed the role of homemaker and the defendant purchased all communal property in his name. When the relationship ended this caused a grey area when it came to communal property. The plaintiff claimed that she and the defendant engaged in a verbal agreement that communal property was shared between them evenly despite all property being in the defendants name.

== Background ==
=== Background of the case ===
Michelle Triola Marvin and actor Lee Marvin began living together in October 1964, though they were never legally married. According to Michelle's later legal complaint, the two had entered into an oral agreement that they would combine their efforts and earnings and share equally any property accumulated during the relationship. She also claimed that Lee Marvin agreed to provide for her financially for the rest of her life. She alleged that she gave up her own career as an entertainer to devote herself to Marvin as a companion, homemaker, housekeeper, and cook.

The relationship ended in May 1970, at which point Michelle was compelled to leave Marvin’s household. For a period of time after the separation, Marvin provided some financial support, but by November 1971 those payments ceased. In January 1972, Michelle filed a lawsuit seeking enforcement of the alleged agreement. She requested financial support and stated that she was entitled to half of the possessions she and the defendant owned during their relationship.

Lee Marvin chose to challenge the legal validity of Mrs Marvin's claim. The trial court ruled in his favor and dismissed the case without allowing Michelle to amend her claims. The court found that her complaint failed to state a cause of action, particularly because the alleged agreement arose out of a non-marital relationship and potentially relied on consideration that included sexual services.

Michelle appealed, and the California Supreme Court agreed to hear the case. The Court’s review focused on whether express or implied agreements between nonmarital partners could be legally enforced, and whether equitable remedies could be applied in such situations. The Court ultimately held that agreements between unmarried cohabitants are valid and enforceable unless they are explicitly based on sexual consideration. The Court also held that, even in the absence of an express agreement, a partner could pursue claims based on implied contract or equitable principles such as quantum meruit.

=== Palimony ===
The term palimony was coined by the media to describe the alimony-like award granted to Michelle Marvin following her legal battle with actor Lee Marvin. Although the word never appeared in the official court decisions, it gained widespread usage after the Marvin v. Marvin case became a legal and cultural milestone. The California Supreme Court's 1976 decision recognized that unmarried partners could enforce express or implied agreements regarding property and support, so long as such agreements were not based solely on sexual services.

== Decision ==
=== Lower court decision ===
Initially the lower courts in this case sides with the defendant Lee Marvin, citing that Michelle Marvin's claims lacked merit and were invalid due to the nature of the relationship she and the defendant were engaged in. The lower court initially decided that the sexual nature of their relationship invalidated Michelle Marvin's claim to half of the property acquired during the relationship.

The lower court found that because Lee Marvin and Michelle Marvin were engaged in a non-marital sexual relationship, their alleged verbal agreement to split all assets could not be enforced or validated. The court cited that Any agreement involving sexual relations as part of the consideration would be deemed meretricious.

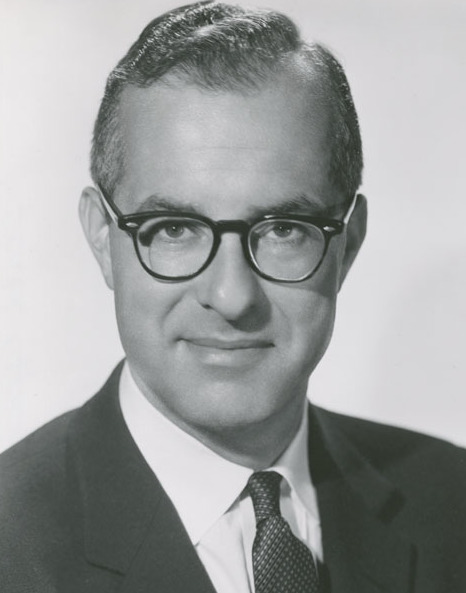
Justice Stanley Mosk authored the majority opinion.

=== California Supreme Court decision ===
Michelle Marvin appealed the decision from the initial case and eventually the verdict was left up to the Supreme Court of California. The highest court in California determined that the sexual nature of the relationship did not invalidate the verbal contract that the defendant and plaintiff engaged in. The California Supreme court found that the relationship between Michelle and Lee Marvin was not strictly based on sexual services; this allowed for Michelle to be awarded damages. Following the Supreme Court’s ruling, the Los Angeles Superior Court awarded Michelle Marvin $104,000 for "rehabilitation purposes". Justice Stanley Mosk authored the majority opinion.

== Significance ==
The Marvin v. Marvin decision marked a turning point in how courts address the rights of unmarried cohabiting partners. For the first time, a U.S. court recognized that nonmarital partners could sue for property division and financial support based on express or implied agreements, even without the legal status of marriage. The California Supreme Court held that agreements between such partners are valid and enforceable unless they are explicitly founded on the exchange of sexual services alone. This changed how the law looked at nonmarital relationships, previously these types of relationships have been considered purely sexual in the eyes of the court, very much like a transactional relationship such as prostitution.

The Marvin case also reflected broader social changes, as cohabitation became more common and socially accepted. It prompted courts across several states to reconsider how they treat long-term, marriage-like relationships outside the legal framework of marriage. In the years that followed, courts in New Jersey, New York, Oregon, and Minnesota issued rulings influenced by Marvin, recognizing claims for support or property division in similar contexts.

Though some states declined to adopt the Marvin approach, the case remains a foundational decision in family law, bridging the gap between legal doctrine and evolving social norms. It helped establish that, while cohabitation is not marriage, it may give rise to enforceable obligations grounded in fairness and the parties’ expectations.
