= Les Whitten =

American journalist, novelist, poet, translator (1928–2017

- Born: Leslie Hunter Whitten Jr. February 21, 1928; Jacksonville, Florida, U.S.
- Died: December 2, 2017 (aged 89); Adelphi, Maryland, U.S.
- Education: Lehigh University
- Occupations: Journalist; poet; translator; horror and science fiction novelist
- Employer: "Washington Merry-Go-Round"
- Spouse: Phyllis Webber

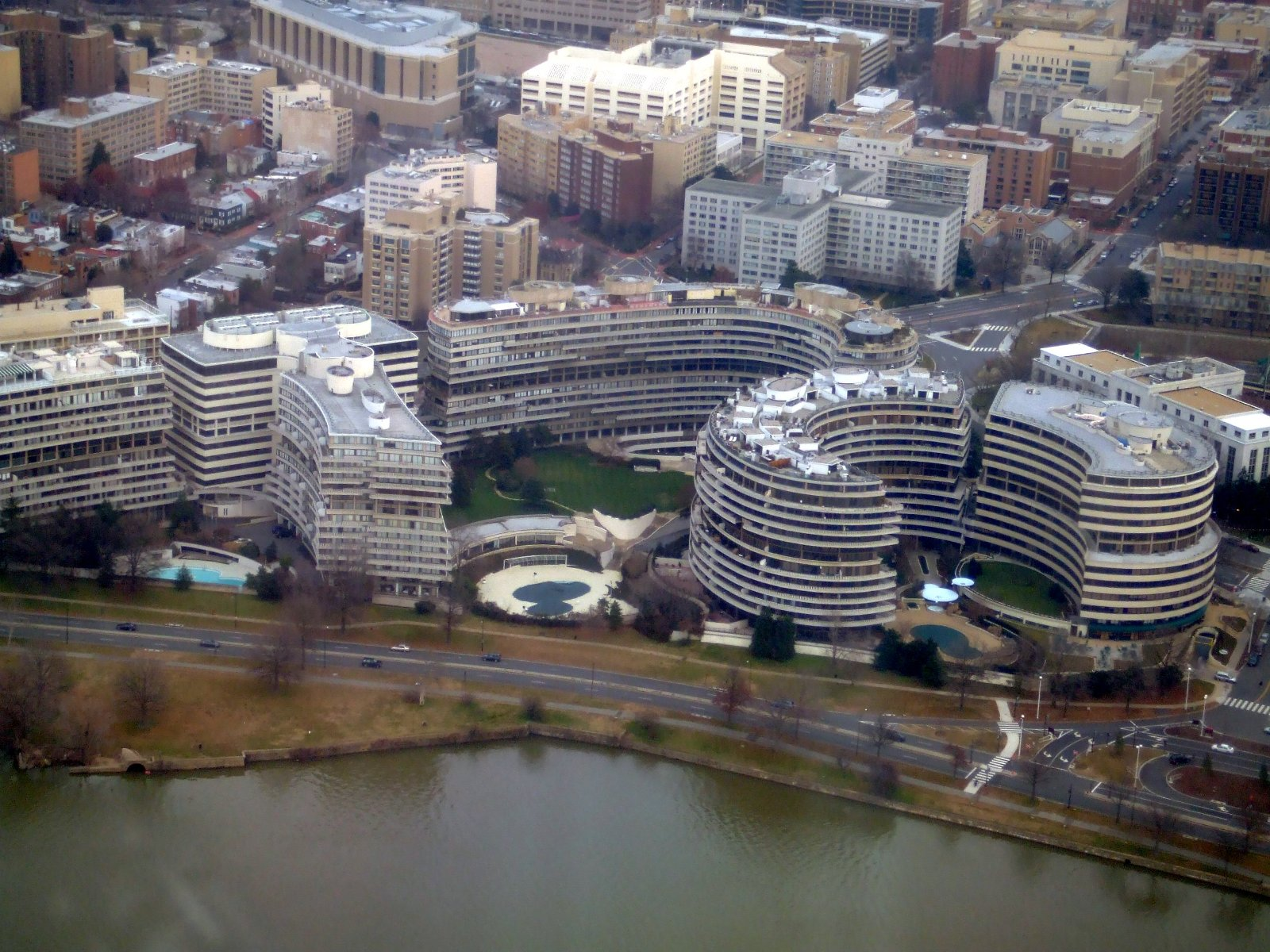
The Watergate scandal was one of the most important news stories that Whitten covered in his career (here, Watergate complex, Washington, D.C.)

Les Whitten (February 21, 1928 – December 2, 2017) was an American investigative reporter at the Washington Merry-Go-Round under Jack Anderson, as well as translator of French poetry by Baudelaire and novelist of horror and science-fiction books.

== Background ==
Leslie Hunter Whitten Jr., was born on February 21, 1928, in Jacksonville, Florida. His father was an electrical engineer and executive with the manufacturer Graybar. His mother was a Latin teacher.

He grew up in Washington, D.C., and attended the Woodrow Wilson High School. "From the time I was 18, I wanted to be a poet," Whitten said later in life. Whitten started at Lehigh University, located in Bethlehem, Pennsylvania, by majoring in civil engineering. After three semesters he left school, served two years in the U.S. Army, and moved to Paris to become a poet.

Returning to Lehigh, he changed his major to English and journalism, became the editor-in-chief of the student newspaper, and graduated magna cum laude in 1950.

== Career ==
=== Journalism ===
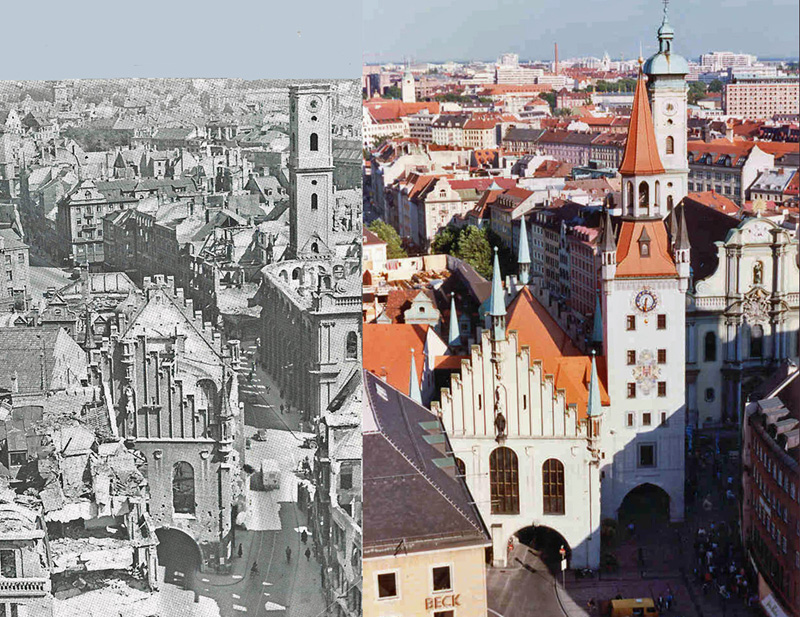
Whitten worked for Radio Free Europe in Munich (here, showing before and after images of bomb damage to Munich's Altstadt during World War II)

Whitten then moved to Mexico and again to Paris, continuing to try to be a writer, before shifting back to journalism in order to support his new family. He then joined the Munich office of Radio Free Europe in 1951 (or 1952), where he worked until 1957. Between 1957 and 1969, he worked for International News Service and United Press International and covered wars in the Dominican Republic and Vietnam.

==== Washington Merry-Go-Round ====
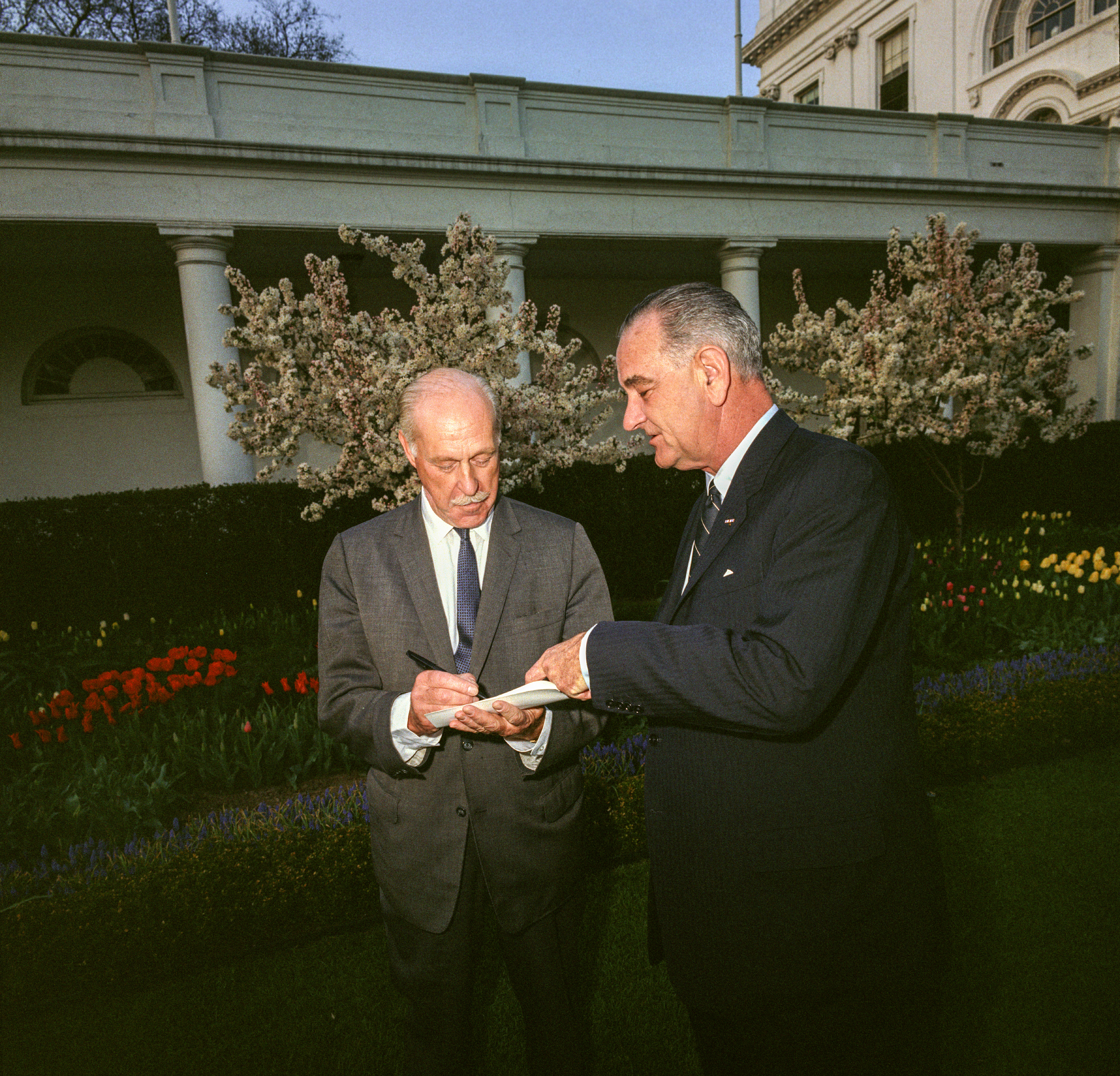
In the 1960s, Whitten worked for Jack Anderson, who took over the Washington Merry-Go-Round from founder Drew Pearson in 1969 (here, Pearson stands left with U.S. President Lyndon Johnson in 1964)

By 1969, Whitten, now an investigative reporter, had worked for The Washington Post and Hearst newspapers and joined the Washington Merry-Go-Round under Jack Anderson, following the death of Anderson's business partner and the column's founder, Drew Pearson. Staff included Brit Hume (later a Fox News anchor) and Jon Lee Anderson (later staff writer for The New Yorker). Coverage by the Washington Merry-Go-Round included a CIA plot to assassinate Fidel Castro and Nixon's secret foreign-policy shift to Pakistan from India. Whitten's specific assignments included investigating the private lives of FBI Director J. Edgar Hoover and top aide Clyde Tolson.

==== Watergate ====
During the 1970s Watergate scandal, Mark Feldstein – author of Poisoning the Press: Richard Nixon, Jack Anderson and the Rise of Washington's Scandal Culture – claimed that Whitten was known to have threatened at least one of his sources by saying "If you don't give this to me, I'll say it came from you, but, if you give it to me, we'll have lunch and I'll say it came from 'a source near the White House'."

==== "Aspirin Roulette" ====
The Nixon administration had the CIA trail Whitten and Anderson. G. Gordon Liddy and E. Howard Hunt even plotted to assassinate Anderson by using LSD (described by Liddy as "Aspirin Roulette"). Later, Liddy recalled in memoirs, they rejected the placing of poisoned aspirin in Anderson's medicine cabinet for two reasons: it might endanger family members – and might take months to work.

==== "Free Les Whitten" ====
In 1973, FBI agents arrested Whitten and Hank Adams as they helped load stolen government documents into his car, earlier taken from the Bureau of Indian Affairs by Native American activists after the Trail of Broken Treaties protest and occupation of the BIA offices. Whitten faced indictment in a First Amendment and ten years in jail. Reporters in Washington wore "Free Les Whitten" buttons; Herblock drew a political cartoon about him.

To secure a government witness for Whitten, Jack Anderson asked Interior Secretary Rogers Morton to "slip me some confidential memos on what you've done" against Native Americans. Secretary Morton complied: Anderson told Whitten, "If this ever comes to trial we're going to have a heck of a witness for your defense."

==== The National Suggestion Box ====
In 1975, Whitten and Anderson started another project, called "The National Suggestion Box", headed by Marty Devolites. From offices in Washington, D.C., it conducted on-the-ground research on topics suggested by the general public then investigated by researchers on staff, including Joanne Munisteri. Reports were culled from its research for short spots on the Good Morning America television show and other media Anderson was responsible for in print, radio and television.

=== Writing ===
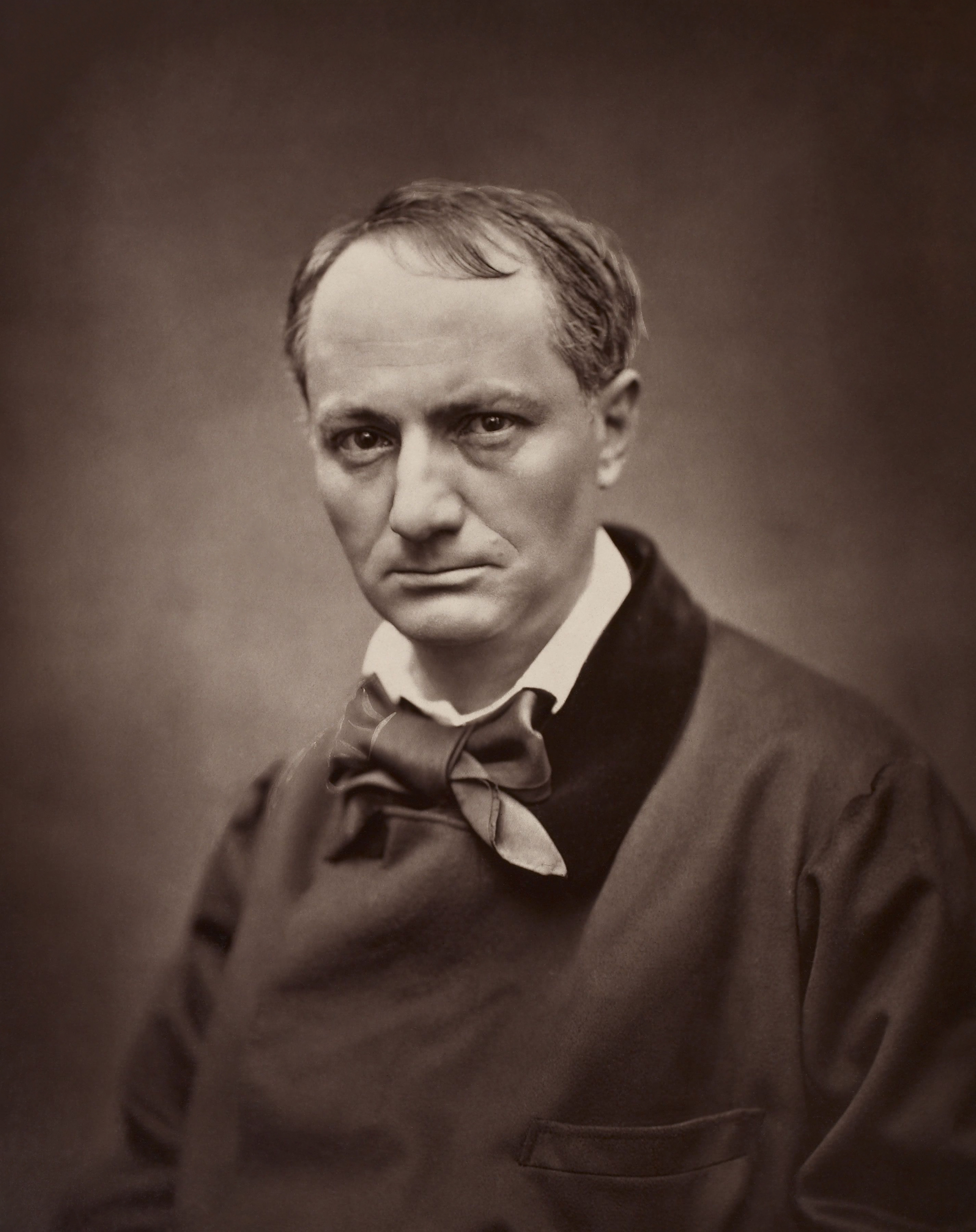
Whitten translated into English the poems of Charles Baudelaire (here, photo by Étienne Carjat, 1863)

Whitten wrote nearly a dozen novels–political thrillers, horror, and science fiction – and translated poetry by Baudelaire from French into English.

In 1976, his novel Conflict of Interest met with such success that by 1978 he had stepped away from journalism to concentrate on his own writing. He wrote multiple novels, as well as other books including a children's book, a biography of lawyer F. Lee Bailey, and a translation of French poet Charles Baudelaire, in his spare time while working as a journalist and then full-time later. His 1967 Gothic horror novel Moon of the Wolf became a made-for-television film, also called Moon of the Wolf, broadcast in 1972.

== Personal and death ==
On November 11, 1951, Whitten married Phyllis Webber (born August 6, 1928) in Paris. The couple had three sons. The Whittens were active in the Episcopal Diocese of Washington, D.C. They also supported the arts, including ballet and opera.

Whitten died age 89 on December 1, 2017, of sepsis in a hospital in Adelphi, Maryland.

=== Phyllis Webber ===
Phyllis Webber, who hailed from Schaefferstown, Pennsylvania, earned a degree in education from Cedar Crest College in Allentown, Pennsylvania, and worked with preschool children at the Henry Street Settlement in New York City.

When the couple moved to Washington, D.C., in 1959, she continued to work in education. In 1973, she became director of the Suburban Nursery School of Bethesda, Maryland, until her retirement in 1993. In 1996, she received a lifetime achievement award from the Maryland Council of Parent Participant Nursery Schools. She died on January 11, 2017.

== Legacy ==
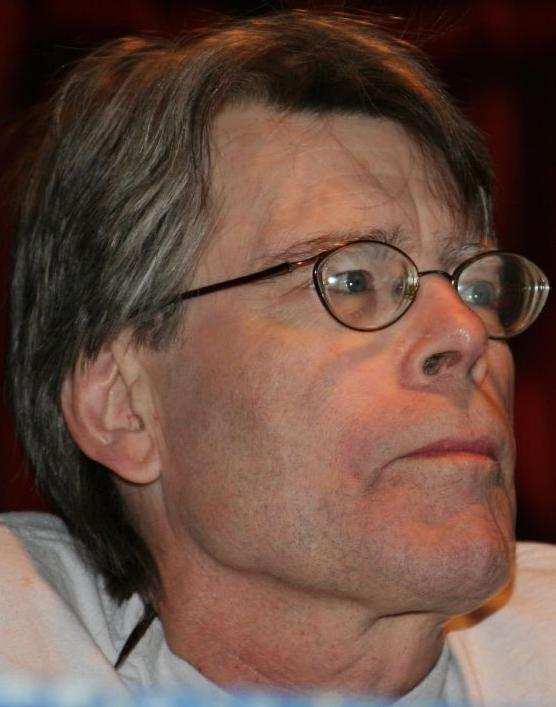
Whitten's The Progeny of the Adder (1965) appears on Stephen King's list of essential horror novels in his non-fiction book Danse Macabre (here, King in 2007)

In 1978, Jack Anderson called Whitten "the best reporter in the country" and said that Whitten had worked on nearly all stories for a decade at the Washington Merry-Go-Round. New York Times journalist Tom Buckley once called him Jack Anderson's "senior ferret".

The Weekly Standard has credited Whitten for having "reinvented Horror and Science Fiction" book genres. The newspaper relates that the vampire horror story The Progeny of the Adder (1965) influenced the 1970s television series Kolchak: The Night Stalker, which in turn influenced the 1990s television series The X-Files. Stephen King listed it among essential horror novels in his non-fiction book Danse Macabre.

== Works ==
Fiction:

- Progeny of the Adder (Crime Club by Doubleday, 1965). Set in Washington, D.C., in the mid-1960s. The hero is a D.C. cop who gradually learns that he is up against something unusual.
- Moon of the Wolf (Crime Club by Doubleday, 1967). Also known as Death of a Nurse, the book, set in the Mississippi delta in 1938, concerns a series of grisly murders.
- Pinion, the Golden Eagle. (Van Nostrand, 1968) Alternates between the story of a golden eagle's attempts to evade hunters, and the progress of legislation in Washington outlawing eagle hunting.
- The Alchemist (Charterhouse, 1973). Two people caught up in the world of Washington politics find themselves drawn together by their interest in the occult. Translated into Spanish in 1980.
- Conflict of Interest (Bantam Books, 1976). A veteran newspaper reporter exposes scandal at the highest levels of the U.S. Senate.
- Sometimes a Hero (Doubleday, 1979). A crack Washington, D.C., lawyer takes on big oil.
- A Killing Pace (Atheneum, 1983). A thriller about a private detective who helps his lawyer friend escape the clutches of the mafia and the Red Brigades.
- A Day Without Sunshine (Atheneum, 1985). This book centers around an English crime kingpin who attempts to monopolize the wine industry.
- The Lost Disciple: the book of Demas (Atheneum, 1989). The life of Jesus as seen by a minor biblical character Demas. Translated into Spanish in 1993.
- The Fangs of Morning (Leisure Books, 1994).
- Moses, The Lost Book of the Bible (New Millennium Press, 1999). A fictionalization of the life of the prophet Moses, narrated by a Greek arms trader.

Biography:

- F. Lee Bailey (Avon, 1971). A biography of lawyer F. Lee Bailey.

Poetry:

- Washington Cycle (The Smith, 1979). A collection of some of Whitten's poems.

Translations:

- Sad Madrigals (Preternatural Press, 1997). Poems by Baudelaire, translated by Whitten.
- The Rebel (Presa S Press, 2005). Poems by Baudelaire, translated by Whitten.
