= Michelle Triola Marvin =

American actress (1932–2009)

- Born: Michelle Triola; November 13, 1932; Los Angeles, California, U.S.
- Died: October 30, 2009 (aged 76); Malibu, California, U.S.
- Education: University of California, Los Angeles
- Occupation: Actress
- Years active: 1965–1985; 2001
- Known for: Suing Lee Marvin in 1977
- Spouse: Skip Ward (m. 1961; div. 1962)
- Partners: Lee Marvin (1965–1970); Dick Van Dyke (1976–2009)

Michelle Triola Marvin (née Triola; November 13, 1932 – October 30, 2009) was an American actress. She famously sued actor Lee Marvin in 1977, having cohabited with him from 1965 to 1970. The trial, which brought about the concept of palimony, was widely covered in the media. During this time, she legally changed her name to add Marvin's surname to her own. She was represented by attorney Marvin Mitchelson.

== Personal life and career ==
Triola was born in Los Angeles and majored in theater arts at UCLA.

Triola was married to actor Skip Ward for six months from November 1961 to June 1962. In 1976, she began living with actor Dick Van Dyke and reportedly stayed with him until her death in 2009; however, it was revealed in December 2025 that Van Dyke's relationship with his current wife Arlene Silver, whom he is acknowledged to have first met in 2006, had by then been ongoing "for nearly 20 years." She had no children.

Triola was a lounge singer and dancer. She danced in the original 1958 Broadway production of Flower Drum Song, directed by Gene Kelly. Her film acting career consisted of minor roles, including a stand-in in Lee Marvin's 1965 film Ship of Fools and a guest role on the Dick Van Dyke television series Diagnosis: Murder.

== Suing Lee Marvin ==
Although she and Marvin never married, Triola sought financial compensation similar to that available to spouses under California's alimony and community property laws. The result was the landmark case Marvin v. Marvin, 18 Cal. 3d 660 (1976). The Supreme Court of California held that Triola could proceed with her suit, as it did state a cause of action and the trial court erred in granting judgment to Marvin on the pleadings.

On April 18, 1979, Judge Arthur K. Marshall ordered Marvin to pay $104,000 to Triola for "rehabilitation purposes", but denied her community property claim for one half of the $3.6 million which Marvin had earned during their six years of cohabitation. The award was overturned in 1981 by the California Second District Court of Appeal, which ruled that the award was not proper but left intact the precedent, which permitted unmarried couples to sue for division of property when they separate. The appellate court found that there was no basis for the award.

== Death ==
In April 2008, she underwent surgery for lung cancer. The cancer caused her death on October 30, 2009, at the home she shared with Van Dyke. She was 76 years old.
