= Deliver Us from Evil (1973 film) =

1973 television film by Boris Sagal

- Genre: Crime; Drama
- Written by: Jack B. Sowards
- Directed by: Boris Sagal
- Starring: George Kennedy; Jan-Michael Vincent; Bradford Dillman; Charles Aidman; Jim Davis; Jack Weston
- Music by: Andrew Belling
- Country of origin: United States
- Original language: English

Production
- Producer: Ron Roth
- Production location: Mount Hood National Forest
- Cinematography: Bill Butler
- Editor: Jim Benson
- Running time: 74 minutes
- Production company: Playboy Productions

Original release
- Network: ABC
- Release: September 11, 1973

Deliver Us from Evil is a 1973 American made-for-television crime drama film starring George Kennedy, Jan-Michael Vincent and Bradford Dillman. It originally aired as the ABC Movie of the Week on September 11, 1973. The film's synopsis is probably inspired from the real-life skyjacker "D. B. Cooper" who on November 24, 1971, hijacked an airliner, extorting US$200,000 and then parachuted out of the plane never to be seen again.

== Plot ==
Five backpackers and their guide, Dixie, are hiking through the northern Rocky Mountains. Tough guy "Cowboy" spots a parachutist landing nearby. They hear a radio newscast that a skyjacker had bailed out of an aircraft somewhere near their location. They search for him the next day. Cowboy shoots and kills the fleeing skyjacker. They find the money in his sleeping bag after burying his body. The group argues about whether to keep the money. Dixie and young Nick Fleming are the most honest and resistant to the idea, although Nick was recently divorced after financial problems. On a precipice trail, Dixie loses his grip and falls to his death. After they realize the authorities don't know the precise location of the skyjacker, they agree to split up the takings, Nick grudgingly so.

Cowboy leads the group toward a glacier over which they can find safety. Aging, overweight Al Zabrocki begins to show strain from carrying the load of gear and money. Accountant Steven Dennis tells the group a scheme he figured out to launder the money through the Mexican banking system. Zabrocki has a heart attack and when most of the group goes ahead the following morning, believes they've stolen his share. Nick tries to assure him, but he runs after the group and dies. Reaching some raging rapids, Cowboy is first to cross the slick rocks. Steven follows. Nick catches up just as his father, Arnold, is crossing. Arnold loses his footing at the final step and falls in. Cowboy tries to save him, both he and Nick urging Arnold to shed his backpack. Arnold does so but is swept away. Nick accuses Cowboy of greed for ransacking Arnold's pack for the money, but Cowboy doesn't really want it, threatening to throw it into the river if Nick doesn't want it. Nick relents.

They hike over the snowy summit, but Steven's socks had gotten wet and he's suffering frostbite. They redistribute the ransom into Cowboy's and Nick's packs so Steven can travel ahead, light a fire and warm his feet. By nightfall, they're caught in a snowstorm and get separated. Nick seeks out Steven while Cowboy goes on alone. Nick finds Steven and takes him to a sheltered spot after dropping his own backpack. Cowboy is caught out in the open and fails in attempts to light his money on fire in the wind and snow, freezing to death. Nick starts a fire, saving Steven's life. In the morning, he sees a group of buildings on the slope below, but no tracks or sign of his backpack. "It's like it never happened." He goes to get help.

== Cast ==
- George Kennedy as Walter "Cowboy" McAdams
- Jan-Michael Vincent as Nick Fleming
- Jim Davis as Dixie
- Jack Weston as Al Zabrocki
- Bradford Dillman as Steven Dennis
- Charles Aidman as Arnold Fleming
- Allen Pinson as Skyjacker

== Production ==
The film was originally called Fair Game. It was shot in Mount Hood National Forest in Oregon's Cascade Mountains. "It's a masculine film, shot against the masculine country essential to an action-suspense drama," write Kennedy. "We expect it to be compared with The Treasure of Sierra Madre."

== Reception ==
=== Critical response ===
The Los Angeles Times said the film was predictable but praised George Kennedy's performance.

=== Release ===
Deliver Us from Evil was released on DVD on September 6, 2006, by Warner Home Video.

== See also ==
- List of American films of 1973
