= Moon of the Wolf =

- VHS cover
- Written by: Leslie H. Whitten; Alvin Sapinsley
- Directed by: Daniel Petrie
- Starring: David Janssen; Barbara Rush; Bradford Dillman; John Beradino; Geoffrey Lewis; Royal Dano; John Davis Chandler
- Music by: Bernardo Segall
- Country of origin: United States
- Original language: English

Production
- Producers: Everett Chambers; Peter Thomas; Edward S. Feldman; Richard M. Rosenbloom
- Cinematography: Richard C. Glouner
- Editor: Richard Halsey
- Running time: 75 minutes
- Production company: Filmways Television

Original release
- Network: American Broadcasting Company
- Release: September 26, 1972

Moon of the Wolf is an American TV movie broadcast on September 26, 1972 on ABC Movie of the Week. It stars David Janssen, Barbara Rush, Geoffrey Lewis and Bradford Dillman, with a script by Alvin Sapinsley based on Leslie H. Whitten's novel of the same nam). The film was directed by Daniel Petrie and filmed on location in Burnside, Louisiana. All of the downtown footage was from Clinton, Louisiana.

== Plot ==
In the Louisiana Bayou town of Marsh Island, two farmers discover the mauled, dead body of a local young woman. Sheriff Aaron Whitaker is called. The victim's temperamental brother, Lawrence Burrifors, arrives at the crime scene. He jumps to the conclusion that the girl's lover committed the murder, a man whose name her brother does not know. The town's Dr. Drutan examines the body and concludes that the girl died from a blow to the head.

The sheriff investigates the crime, and residents have a variety of theories, including the belief that wild dogs killed her. A posse forms to track down the wild dogs with little success. Burrifors continues to insist the killer is his sister's mysterious lover, while the sheriff, in turn, is suspicious of him. The girl's sick and dying father, Hugh Burrifors, interviewed by the sheriff, warns him of the loup-garou. The sheriff does not understand the French term.

The sheriff's investigation soon takes him to the plantation home of the wealthy Andrew Rodanthe and his sister Louise. They are the last of a local family dynasty. Andrew, whom the sheriff suspects had an affair with the victim, claims to have been suffering an attack of malaria the night the girl was killed.

The sheriff, suspicious of the temperamental brother Lawrence after he assaults the town doctor, who turns out to be the mysterious lover, puts him in jail. While there, the full moon rises again, and Lawrence and the sheriff's deputy are killed in a vicious attack after the steel bars of the cell are torn from the wall.

With the town's residents fearful and the sheriff without assistance, Andrew Rodanthe volunteers to become a deputy. Andrew and the sheriff return to Hugh Burrifor's house and discover that the old man has created a voodoo potion that gives off a vapor meant to repel the Rougarou. Rodanthe inhales the potion and goes into what appears to be an epileptic seizure. He is taken to the hospital.

While there, Andrew's sister Louise tells the sheriff she can speak French fluently and would talk to Hugh Burrifor about the unexplainable term Rougarou. While speaking with the old man, Louise solves the puzzle. Rougarou is a mispronunciation of Loup Garou. Translated into English, the term means werewolf.

Transformed into a werewolf, Andrew violently escapes the hospital and becomes the subject of a manhunt. As a posse gathers, Louise runs to the mayor, telling him that her brother is sick and that there are drugs that can help him. At her and Andrew's home, Louise talks to Sheriff Whitaker about werewolf folklore. She reveals a family secret, that her grandfather used to suffer from unusual spells of sickness, implying he was a werewolf, and Andrew's curse was inherited.

Louise returns to her plantation home alone, and Andrew, still in his werewolf form, enters the house. Louise flees to the barn. When the werewolf follows, she attempts to set him afire, then returns to the house. Andrew escapes the fire and pursues Louise. She eventually shoots him just as the sheriff returns. After he dies, Andrew returns to his human form.

== Cast ==
- David Janssen as Sheriff Aaron Whitaker
- Barbara Rush as Louise Rodanthe
- Bradford Dillman as Andrew Rodanthe
- John Beradino as Dr. Druten
- Geoffrey Lewis as Lawrence
- Royal Dano as Tom Gurmandy Sr.
- John Davis Chandler as Tom Gurmandy Jr.
- Claudia McNeil as Sara
- Robert Phillips as Deputy
- Dick Crockett as attendant
- Paul R. Deville as Hugh

== See also ==
- List of films in the public domain in the United States
