= Sergeant Ryker =

1968 film by Buzz Kulik

- Theatrical release poster
- Directed by: Buzz Kulik
- Written by: William D. Gordon; Seeleg Lester
- Produced by: Frank Telford
- Starring: Lee Marvin; Bradford Dillman; Vera Miles; Peter Graves
- Cinematography: Walter Strenge
- Edited by: Robert B. Warwick Jr.
- Music by: John Williams
- Distributed by: Universal Pictures
- Release date: February 1, 1968
- Running time: 85 minutes
- Country: United States
- Language: English
- Box office: $1,000,000 (US/ Canada)

Sergeant Ryker (also known as The Case Against Paul Ryker) is a 1963 American drama war film directed by Buzz Kulik and starring Lee Marvin, Bradford Dillman and Peter Graves. It was written by William D. Gordon and Seeleg Lester.

== Plot ==
Sgt. Ryker is an American soldier charged with treason during the Korean War. He is court-martialed and prosecuted by Capt. David Young and convicted and sentenced to death.

Ryker's wife, Ann, insists that her husband received an inadequate defense. She believes his story that he had been on a secret mission, assigned by a superior officer who has since died and can no longer vouch for him.

Capt. Young believes Ryker is guilty, but he, too, thinks Ryker received an inadequate legal defense. He persuades the commanding general to give Ryker a new trial. The general reluctantly does so, but he insists that this time Young must serve as Ryker's defense counsel. Ryker has already resigned himself to his fate, and has to be persuaded to go along with the retrial. As it unfolds, all the evidence is damning to Ryker, the best Young can do is establish that Ryker's version of events is not impossible. The defense is also undermined by several of Ryker's lies and omissions, which are exposed during testimony at the trial, and also by Ryker's occasional fits of temper. A further complication ensues when a romantic attachment develops between Young and Ryker's wife. Ryker is furious when he realizes it has happened, and the general on hearing about it tells Young he will be court-martialed as soon as Ryker's trial is over.

The prosecutor, Maj. Whitaker, unearths new evidence damning to the defendant's case, and all seems lost. At the last minute, however, Young learns some information from Sergeant Max Winkler, which verifies some aspects of Ryker's claim, and which when followed up on by Young, is enough to set Ryker free.

== Cast ==
- Lee Marvin as Sgt. Paul Ryker
- Bradford Dillman as Capt. David Young
- Peter Graves as Maj. Whitaker
- Vera Miles as Ann Ryker
- Lloyd Nolan as Gen. Amos Bailey
- Murray Hamilton as Capt. Appleton
- Norman Fell as Sgt. Max Winkler
- Walter Brooke as Col. Arthur Merriam
- Francis DeSales as President of the Court
- Don Marshall as Cpl. Jenks
- Charles Aidman as Maj. Kitchener

== Release ==
The film was originally broadcast on television as "The Case Against Paul Ryker", a 1963 two-part episode of Kraft Suspense Theatre. It was released as a feature film in 1968 to capitalize on Marvin's popularity from The Dirty Dozen. Its second run paired it as a double feature with Counterpoint (1968) starring Charlton Heston.

== Reception ==
Boxoffice wrote: "Under Buzz Kulik's taut direction, Marvin gives a strong, if extremely melodramatic, portrayal of an American sergeant accused of treason and sentenced to hang. His role, however, is less important than Bradford Dillman, as the too young prosecuting attorney, while Vera Miles, as Ryker's troubled wife who demands a new trial, and Lloyd Nolan, a fine actor who is seen too infrequently on the screen, have equal footage to Marvin."

The Monthly Film Bulletin wrote: "The film's television origins are unfortunately only too apparent in the preponderance of close-ups, awkwardly incorporated flashbacks, and garish colour which is so ill-matched that in several scenes Marvin's face changes from dull pink to tomato red in successive shots. The story is routine courtmartial melodrama, complete with last-minute surprise witness, high-minded platitudes about justice and morality, and a singular lack of suspense."

== See also ==
- List of American films of 1968
