= Judy Nelson =

American writer

- Occupation: Author
- Children: 2

Judy Hill Nelson is an American author best known for her 1983–1991 romance (while married) with and eventual palimony suit against professional tennis star Martina Navratilova.

== Books ==
After their break-up, Nelson was the author of the books Love Match: Nelson vs. Navratilova, chronicling her relationship with the tennis star, and Choices: My Journey After Leaving My Husband for Martina and a Lesbian Life, chronicling her coming out as a lesbian in the mid-1980s.

== Personal life ==
Nelson is the mother of two sons.
