= Lee Marvin =

American actor (1924–1987)

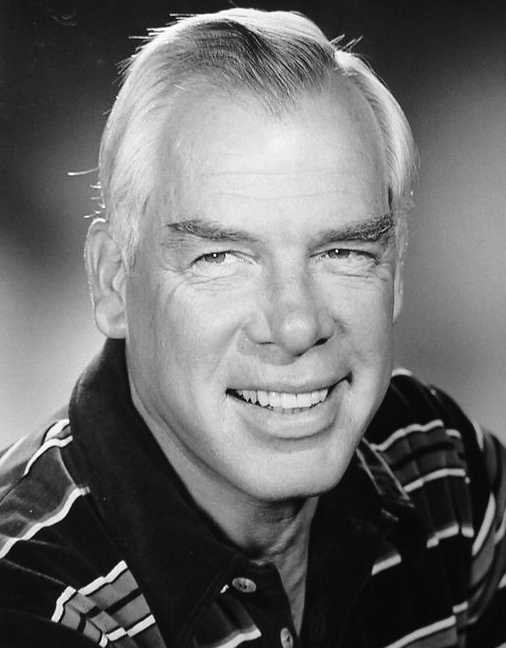
- Marvin in 1971
- Born: Lamont Waltman Marvin Jr. February 19, 1924; New York City, U.S.
- Died: August 29, 1987 (aged 63); Tucson, Arizona, U.S.
- Resting place: Arlington National Cemetery
- Education: American Theatre Wing
- Occupation: Actor
- Years active: 1949–1987
- Political party: Democratic
- Spouses: Betty Ebeling (m. 1952; div. 1967); Pamela Feeley (m. 1970)
- Partner: Michelle Triola (1965–1970)
- Children: 4
- Military service
- Allegiance: United States
- Branch: United States Marine Corps
- Service years: 1942–1945
- Rank: Private first class
- Unit: Company I, 3rd Battalion, 24th Marines, 4th Marine Division
- Conflicts: World War II; Pacific War; Battle of Kwajalein; Battle of Eniwetok; Battle of Saipan (WIA)
- Awards: Purple Heart

Lamont Warren "Lee" Marvin Jr. (February 19, 1924 – August 29, 1987) was an American actor. Known for his bass voice and prematurely white hair, he is best remembered for playing hardboiled "tough guy" characters. He received various accolades including an Academy Award, a Golden Globe Award, and two BAFTA Awards. He was also a decorated United States Marine during the Second World War. He was also a descendant of the Lee family of Virginia.

Although initially typecast as the "heavy" (i.e. villainous character), he later gained prominence for portraying anti-heroes, such as Detective Lieutenant Frank Ballinger on the television series M Squad (1957–1960). Marvin's notable roles in film included Vince Stone in The Big Heat (1953), Liberty Valance in The Man Who Shot Liberty Valance (1962), Charlie Strom in The Killers (1964), Rico Fardan in The Professionals (1966), Major John Reisman in The Dirty Dozen (1967), Walker in Point Blank (1967), Ben Rumson in Paint Your Wagon (1969), the Sergeant in The Big Red One (1980), and Jack Osborne in Gorky Park (1983).

Marvin achieved numerous accolades when he portrayed a dual role as gunfighter Kid Shelleen and criminal Tim Strawn for the comedy Western film Cat Ballou (1965), alongside Jane Fonda, a surprise hit which won him the Oscar for Best Actor, along with a BAFTA Award, a Golden Globe Award, an NBR Award, and the Silver Bear for Best Actor.

== Early life ==
Lamont Waltman Marvin Jr. was born in New York City to Lamont Waltman Marvin – a World War I veteran of the Army Corps of Engineers and an advertising executive – and Courtenay Washington (née Davidge), a fashion writer. Confederate General Robert E. Lee was his first cousin, four times removed. He was also a second cousin six times removed of first U.S. President George Washington. His father was a direct descendant of Matthew Marvin Sr., who emigrated from Great Bentley, Essex, England, in 1635, and helped found Hartford, Connecticut. Marvin studied violin when he was young. Marvin did not enjoy school and performed poorly. As a teenager, Marvin "spent weekends and spare time hunting deer, puma, wild turkey, and bobwhite in the wilds of the then-uncharted Everglades".

He attended Manumit School, a Christian socialist boarding school in Pawling, New York, during the late 1930s, and Peekskill Military Academy in Peekskill, New York. He later attended St. Leo College Preparatory School, a Catholic school in St. Leo, Florida, after being expelled from several other schools for bad behavior (smoking cigarettes, truancy of lessons and fights).

== Military service ==
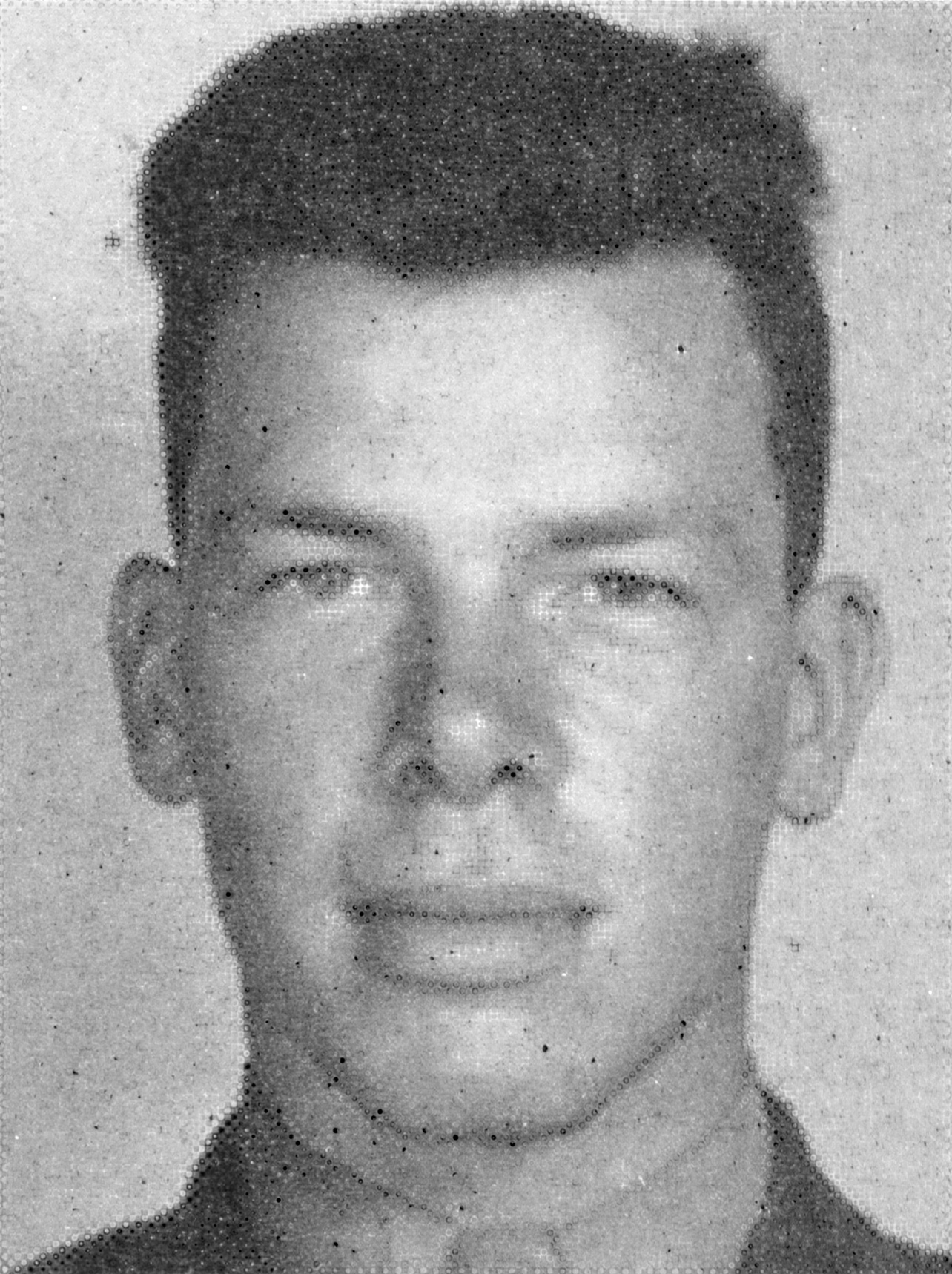
Picture of Private Lee Marvin, USMC, as listed in the "Red Book", 24th Regiment, 4th Marine Division, published in 1943

Marvin enlisted in the United States Marine Corps on August 12, 1942 at 18 years old. Before becoming an infantryman, he served as a quartermaster. Marvin served in the 4th Marine Division as a scout sniper in the Pacific Theater during World War II, including assaults on Kwajalein, Eniwetok, and Saipan-Tinian. While serving as a member of India ("I") Company, 3rd Battalion, 24th Marines, 4th Marine Division, Marvin participated in 21 amphibious assaults on Japanese-held islands. He was wounded in action on June 18, 1944, while taking part in the assault on Mount Tapochau during the Battle of Saipan, in which most of his company became casualties. He was hit by machine gun fire, which severed his sciatic nerve, and then was hit in the foot by a sniper. After over a year of medical treatment in naval hospitals, Marvin was given a medical discharge with the rank of private first class. He had previously held the rank of corporal before being demoted for troublemaking.

Marvin's decorations include the Purple Heart Medal, the Presidential Unit Citation, the American Campaign Medal, the Asiatic-Pacific Campaign Medal, the World War II Victory Medal, and the Combat Action Ribbon.

== Military Awards ==

Purple Heart
Combat Action Ribbon	Presidential Unit Citation	Navy Unit Commendation
American Campaign Medal	Asiatic-Pacific Campaign Medal with 2 bronze service star	World War II Victory Medal

== Acting career ==
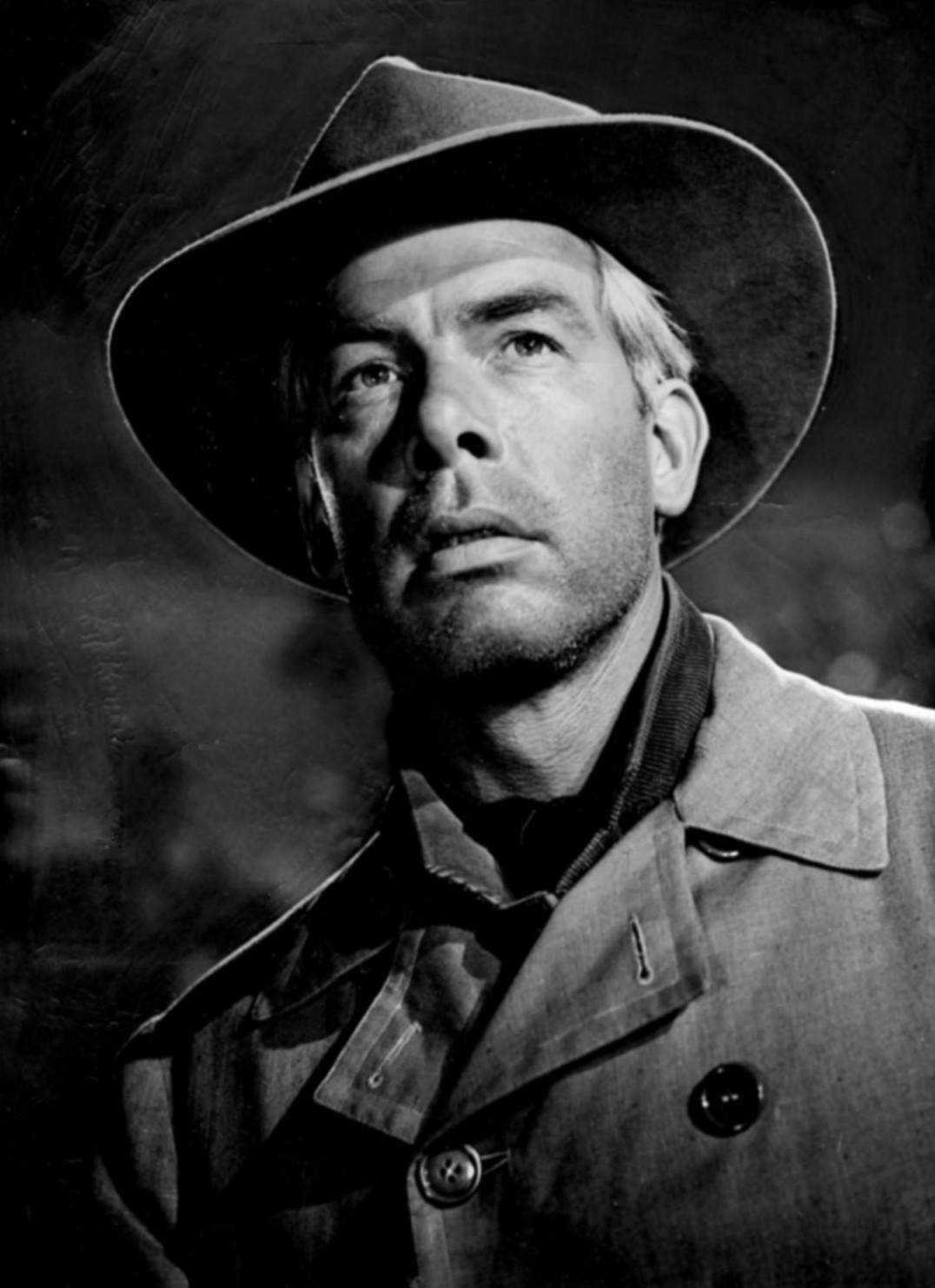
Lee Marvin in "The Grave", a 1961 episode of The Twilight Zone

=== Early acting career ===
After the war, while working as a plumber's assistant in the artist village of Woodstock in upstate New York, Marvin was asked to replace an actor who had fallen ill during rehearsals. He caught the acting bug and got a job with the company for $7 a week. He moved to Greenwich Village and used the G.I. Bill to study at the American Theatre Wing.

He appeared on stage in a production of Uniform of Flesh, the original version of Billy Budd (1949). It was performed at the Experimental Theatre, where a few months later, Marvin also appeared in The Nineteenth Hole of Europe (1949).

Marvin began appearing on television shows like Escape, The Big Story, and Treasury Men in Action.

He made it to Broadway with a small role in a production of Uniform of Flesh, now titled Billy Budd, in February 1951.

=== Hollywood ===
Marvin's film debut was in You're in the Navy Now (1951), directed by Henry Hathaway, a movie that also marked the debuts of Charles Bronson and Jack Warden. This required some filming in Hollywood and Marvin decided to stay in California.

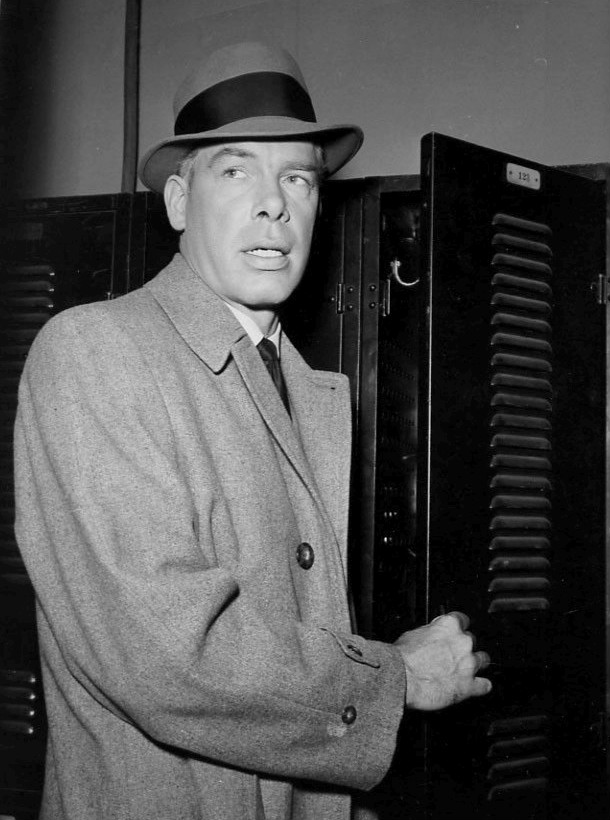
Marvin in M Squad (1957–1960)

He had a similarly small part in Teresa (1951), directed by Fred Zinnemann. As a decorated combat veteran, Marvin was a natural in war dramas, where he frequently assisted the director and other actors in realistically portraying infantry movement, arranging costumes, and the use of firearms.

He guest starred on episodes of Fireside Theatre, Suspense, and Rebound. Hathaway used him again on Diplomatic Courier (1952) and he could be seen in Down Among the Sheltering Palms (1952), directed by Edmund Goulding; We're Not Married! (1952), also for Goulding; The Duel at Silver Creek (1952), directed by Don Siegel; and Hangman's Knot (1952), directed by Roy Huggins.

He guest starred on Biff Baker, U.S.A. and Dragnet, and had a showcase role as the squad leader in a feature titled Eight Iron Men (1952), a war film directed by Edward Dmytryk and produced by Stanley Kramer (Marvin's role had been played on Broadway by Burt Lancaster).

He was a sergeant in Seminole (1953), a Western directed by Budd Boetticher, and was a corporal in The Glory Brigade (1953), a Korean War film.

Marvin guest starred in The Doctor, The Revlon Mirror Theater, Suspense, and The Motorola Television Hour.

He was now in much demand for Westerns and starred in The Stranger Wore a Gun (1953) with Randolph Scott and Gun Fury (1953) with Rock Hudson.

=== The Big Heat and The Wild One ===
Marvin received much acclaim for his portrayal of villains in Fritz Lang's The Big Heat (1953), where he played Gloria Grahame's vicious boyfriend and The Wild One (1953), opposite Marlon Brando (Marvin's gang in the film was named "The Beetles"), produced by Stanley Kramer.

He continued in TV shows such as The Plymouth Playhouse and The Pepsi-Cola Playhouse. He had supporting roles in Gorilla at Large (1954) and had a notable small role in The Caine Mutiny (1954), also produced by Kramer, as the smart-aleck sailor Meatball.

In 1954, Marvin was in The Raid and on TV in Center Stage, Medic and TV Reader's Digest.

In 1955, he was cast as Hector, the small-town hood in Bad Day at Black Rock which starred Spencer Tracy. He played a conflicted, brutal bank-robber in Violent Saturday. Of Marvin's performance, one critic wrote that "Marvin brings a multi-faceted complexity to the role and gives a great example of the early promise that launched his long and successful career."

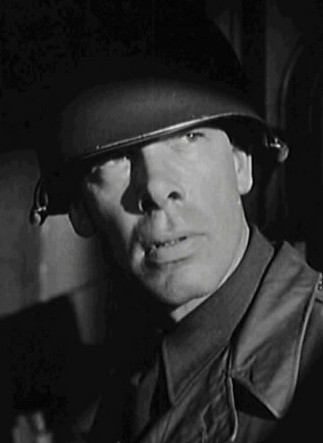
Marvin in Attack (1956)

Marvin played Robert Mitchum's and Frank Sinatra's friend in Not as a Stranger (1955), a medical drama produced and directed by Stanley Kramer. He had good supporting roles in A Life in the Balance (1955) (he was third billed), and Pete Kelly's Blues (1955) and appeared on TV in Jane Wyman Presents The Fireside Theatre and Studio One in Hollywood.

Marvin was in I Died a Thousand Times (1955) with Jack Palance, Shack Out on 101 (1955), Kraft Theatre, and Front Row Center.

Marvin was the villain in Seven Men from Now (1956) starring Randolph Scott and directed by Boetticher. He was second-billed to Palance in Attack (1956) directed by Robert Aldrich.

Marvin had roles in Pillars of the Sky (1956) with Jeff Chandler, The Rack (1956) with Paul Newman, Raintree County (1957) with Elizabeth Taylor and Montgomery Clift and a leading role in The Missouri Traveler (1958). He also guest starred on Climax! (several times), Studio 57, The United States Steel Hour and Schlitz Playhouse.

=== M Squad ===
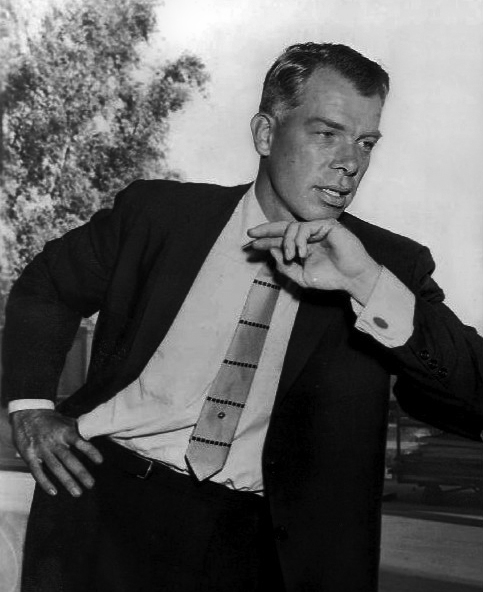
Marvin in 1959 from the set of M Squad

Marvin debuted as a leading man in M Squad as Chicago cop Frank Ballinger in 100 episodes of the successful 1957–1960 television series. One critic described the show as "a hyped-up, violent Dragnet ...with a hard-as-nails Marvin" playing a tough police lieutenant. Marvin received the role after guest-starring in a Dragnet episode as a serial killer.

When the series ended Marvin appeared on Westinghouse Desilu Playhouse, NBC Sunday Showcase, The Barbara Stanwyck Show, The Americans, Wagon Train, Checkmate, General Electric Theater, Alcoa Premiere, The Investigators, Route 66 (he was injured during a fight scene), Ben Casey, Bonanza, The Untouchables (several times), The Virginian, The Twilight Zone ("The Grave" and "Steel"), and The Dick Powell Theatre.

=== Early 1960s ===
==== The Man Who Shot Liberty Valance ====
Marvin returned to feature films with a prominent role in The Comancheros (1961) starring John Wayne and Stuart Whitman. He played in two more films with Wayne, both directed by John Ford: The Man Who Shot Liberty Valance (1962), and Donovan's Reef (1963). As the vicious Liberty Valance, Marvin held his own with two of the screen's biggest stars, Wayne and James Stewart.

==== Television ====
In 1962 Marvin appeared as Martin Kalig on the TV Western The Virginian in the episode titled "It Tolls for Thee." He continued to guest star on shows like Combat!, Dr. Kildare and The Great Adventure. He did The Case Against Paul Ryker for Kraft Suspense Theatre. Also in 1962, Marvin appeared as Peter Kane on the TV Western Bonanza in the 28th episode of season 3 titled "The Crucible".

==== The Killers ====
For director Don Siegel, Marvin appeared in The Killers (1964) playing an efficient professional assassin alongside Clu Gulager, grappling with villains Ronald Reagan and Angie Dickinson. The film is a remake of The Killers by Richard Siodmak, made in 1946 and starring Burt Lancaster and Ava Gardner. The Killers was the first film in which Marvin received top billing. Originally made as a TV-movie, the film was deemed so entertaining that it was exhibited in theaters instead.

In January 1965, he guest starred on Bob Hope Presents the Chrysler Theatre.

=== Cat Ballou and stardom ===
Marvin finally became a star for his dual role in the offbeat comedic Western Cat Ballou (1965) starring Jane Fonda. This was a surprise hit, and Marvin won the Academy Award for Best Actor. He also won the Silver Bear for Best Actor at the 15th Berlin International Film Festival in 1965.

Playing alongside Vivien Leigh and Simone Signoret, Marvin won the 1966 National Board of Review Award for male actors for his role in Ship of Fools (1965) directed by Kramer. (Note: The film proved to be Leigh's last film and her anguished portrayal of a desperate older woman was punctuated by her real-life "battle with demons". Leigh's performance was tinged by paranoia and resulted in outbursts that marred her relationship with other actors, although both Simone Signoret and Marvin were sympathetic and understanding. In one unusual instance, she hit Marvin so hard with a spiked shoe, it marked his face.)

==== The Professionals ====
Marvin next performed in the highly regarded Western The Professionals (1966), in which he played the leader of a small band of skilled mercenaries (Burt Lancaster, Robert Ryan, and Woody Strode) rescuing a kidnap victim (Claudia Cardinale) shortly after the Mexican Revolution. He had top billing to Lancaster.

==== The Dirty Dozen ====
He followed that film with the hugely successful World War II epic The Dirty Dozen (1967) in which top-billed Marvin again portrayed an intrepid commander of a colorful group (played by John Cassavetes, Charles Bronson, Telly Savalas, Jim Brown, and Donald Sutherland) performing an almost impossible mission. Robert Aldrich directed. In an interview, Marvin stated his time in the Marine Corps helped shape that role "by playing an officer how I felt it should have been seen, from the bias of an enlisted man's viewpoint".

==== Point Blank ====
In the wake of these films and after having received his Oscar, Marvin was a huge star, given enormous control over his next film Point Blank (1967). In Point Blank, an influential film from director John Boorman, he portrayed a hard-nosed criminal bent on revenge. Marvin, who had selected Boorman for the director's slot, had a central role in the film's development, plot, and staging.

==== Hell in the Pacific and Sergeant Ryker ====
In 1968, Marvin also appeared in another Boorman film, the critically acclaimed but commercially unsuccessful World War II character study Hell in the Pacific, also starring famed Japanese actor Toshiro Mifune. Boorman recounted his work with Lee Marvin on these two films and Marvin's influence on his career in the 1998 documentary Lee Marvin: A Personal Portrait by John Boorman. The Case Against Paul Ryker with Bradford Dillman, which Marvin shot for TV's Kraft Suspense Theatre and had been telecast in 1963, was released theatrically as Sergeant Ryker in 1968 after the runaway success of The Dirty Dozen.

==== Paint Your Wagon ====
Marvin was originally cast as Pike Bishop (ultimately played by William Holden) in The Wild Bunch (1969), but fell out with director Sam Peckinpah and pulled out to star in the Western musical Paint Your Wagon (1969), in which he was top-billed over a singing Clint Eastwood. Despite his limited singing ability, he had a hit with the song "Wand'rin' Star". By this time, he was getting paid $1 million per film, $200,000 less than top star Paul Newman was making at the time, yet he was ambivalent about the movie business, even with its financial rewards:

You spend the first forty years of your life trying to get in this business, and the next forty years trying to get out. And then when you're making the bread, who needs it?

=== 1970s ===
Marvin had a much greater variety of roles in the 1970s, with fewer 'bad-guy' roles than in earlier years. His 1970s movies included Monte Walsh (1970), a Western with Palance and Jeanne Moreau; the violent Prime Cut (1972) with Gene Hackman; Pocket Money (1972) with Paul Newman, for Stuart Rosenberg; Emperor of the North (1973) opposite Ernest Borgnine for Aldrich; as Hickey in The Iceman Cometh (1973) with Fredric March and Robert Ryan, for John Frankenheimer.

In 1974, Marvin acted in Richard Fleischer's The Spikes Gang, and in Terence Young's The Klansman in a shared top billing with Richard Burton.

During this time, Marvin was offered the role of Quint in Jaws (1975) but declined, stating "What would I tell my fishing friends who'd see me come off as a hero against a dummy shark?"

In 1976, Marvin co-led with Roger Moore in the film Shout at the Devil, a World War I adventure, directed by Peter Hunt. While the reviews were mixed, the film was a commercial success. Both stars were offered to return to their roles in a sequel that never happened.

Also that year, he was a lead in Don Taylor's The Great Scout & Cathouse Thursday, a comic Western with Oliver Reed. The film was a critical disappointment.

In 1979, Marvin co-led with Robert Shaw in Mark Robson's Cold War thriller Avalanche Express, his co-star and the director both died from heart related illness shortly after production.

=== 1980s ===
In 1980, Marvin's last big role was in Samuel Fuller's The Big Red One, a war film based on Fuller's own war experiences. Fuller said that Marvin character was the "carpenter of death, the sergeants of this world have been dealing death to young men for 10,000 years." Matthew Carey Salyer who liked the film said that "it's one of Lee Marvin's most brilliant performances, in part because of its restraint."

In 1981, Marvin co-led with Charles Bronson in Peter Hunt's adventure film Death Hunt. It is a fictionalized account of the Royal Canadian Mounted Police (RCMP) pursuit of a man named Albert Johnson. In Vincent Canby's review for The New York Times, he recognized that two old pros were at work. "Mr. Bronson and Mr. Marvin are such old hands at this sort of movie that each can create a character with ease, out of thin, cold air." The film grossed $5,000,000 at the US box-office.

In 1984, Marvin acted in Michael Apted's Gorky Park, which stars William Hurt. Film critic Roger Ebert liked the film; he felt Marvin was typecast, but perfect as the businessman. The film grossed $15,856,028 at the US box-office.

In 1984, Marvin played an American bank robber in Yves Boisset's French film Canicule. Of the project Marvin said "I pull this job and I get trapped by farmers I have the money on me so that brings out their evil — the evil that lurks in men".

In 1985, Marvin acted in The Dirty Dozen: Next Mission, a television film sequel to The Dirty Dozen that picked up where his character had left off. The TV film featured some other original cast members as well as new characters. Fred Rothenberg in his review published in The Grand Island Independent said "Lee Marvin, the gruff, throw-out-the-book major, may be nearly 20 years older since the last "Dirty Dozen," but he can still deliver the lines and the goods."

In 1986, Marvin made his final appearance, co-leading with Chuck Norris, in Menahem Golan's action film The Delta Force. The role was initially written for Charles Bronson who had other commitments, which lead to Marvin's hiring. The film grossed $17,768,900 at the US box-office.

== Personal life ==
Marvin was a Democrat. He publicly endorsed John F. Kennedy in the 1960 presidential election. In a 1969 Playboy interview, Marvin said he supported gay rights.

=== Marriages, children and partners ===
Marvin married Betty Ebeling in April 1952 and together they had four children: a son Christopher Lamont (1952–2013), and three daughters: Courtenay Lee, Cynthia Louise, and Claudia Leslie (1958–2012). After a separation of two years, they divorced in January 1967. In her 2010 book, Tales of a Hollywood Housewife: A Memoir by the First Mrs. Lee Marvin, Betty claimed that Lee had an affair with actress Anne Bancroft.

After his famous relationship with Michelle Triola, Marvin reconnected with his childhood sweetheart Pamela Feeley, whom he married in 1970. They remained married until his death in 1987. After his death, Pamela wrote and published Lee: A Romance in 1997.

=== Community property case ===
See also Marvin v. Marvin

In 1971, Marvin was sued by Michelle Triola, his live-in girlfriend from 1965 to 1970, who legally changed her surname to "Marvin". Although the couple never married, she sought financial compensation similar to that available to spouses under California's alimony and community property laws. Triola claimed Marvin made her pregnant three times and paid for two abortions, while one pregnancy ended in miscarriage. She claimed the second abortion left her unable to bear children. The result was the landmark "palimony" case, Marvin v. Marvin, 18 Cal. 3d 660 (1976).

In 1979, Marvin was ordered to pay $104,000 to Triola for "rehabilitation purposes", but the court denied her community property claim for half of the $3.6 million Marvin had earned during their six years of cohabitation – distinguishing nonmarital relationship contracts from marriage, with community property rights only attaching to the latter by operation of law. Rights equivalent to community property only apply in nonmarital relationship contracts when the parties expressly, whether orally or in writing, contract for such rights to operate between them. In August 1981, the California Court of Appeal found that no such contract existed between them and nullified the award she had received. Michelle Triola died of lung cancer on October 30, 2009, having been with actor Dick Van Dyke since 1976.

Later there was controversy after Marvin characterized the trial as a "circus", saying "everyone was lying, even I lied". There were official comments about possibly charging Marvin with perjury, but no charges were filed.

This case was used as fodder for a mock debate skit on Saturday Night Live called "Point Counterpoint" and a skit on The Tonight Show Starring Johnny Carson with Carson as Adam, and Betty White as Eve.

== Death ==
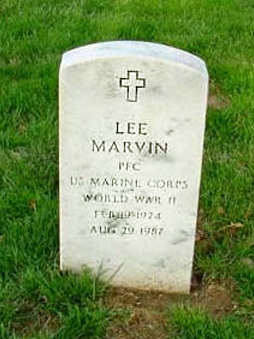
Grave of Lee Marvin at Arlington National Cemetery

A heavy smoker and drinker, Marvin had health problems by the end of his life. In December 1986, Marvin was hospitalized for more than two weeks because of a condition related to coccidioidomycosis. He went into respiratory distress and was administered steroids to help his breathing. He had major intestinal ruptures as a result, and underwent a colectomy. Marvin died of a heart attack on August 29, 1987, aged 63. He was buried with full military honors at Arlington National Cemetery.

== See also ==
- The Sons of Lee Marvin, a tongue-in-cheek secret society dedicated to Marvin
- Welcome to Night Vale, which features Lee Marvin as an integral piece of its mythology and supporting cast.
