= Crack in the Mirror =

1960 film by Richard Fleischer

- Theatrical release poster
- Directed by: Richard Fleischer
- Written by: Mark Canfield; Uncredited: Jules Dassin; Richard Fleischer; Julien Derode; John Shepridge
- Produced by: Darryl F. Zanuck
- Starring: Orson Welles; Juliette Gréco; Bradford Dillman
- Cinematography: William C. Mellor
- Edited by: Roger Dwyre
- Music by: Maurice Jarre
- Production company: Darryl F. Zanuck Productions
- Distributed by: 20th Century-Fox
- Release date: May 19, 1960
- Running time: 97 minutes
- Country: United States
- Language: English
- Box office: $1 million (US/ Canada)

Crack in the Mirror is a 1960 American drama film directed by Richard Fleischer. The three principal actors, Orson Welles, Juliette Gréco, and Bradford Dillman, play dual roles in two interconnected stories as the participants in two love triangles.

The film was released by 20th Century Fox on May 19, 1960.

== Plot ==
In a run-down Paris dwelling, an angry Hagolin accuses mistress Eponine of seeing a man named Robert Larnier behind his back. In a party at a stately home, prosperous attorney Lamerciere's guests include his longtime mistress Florence and his young law partner Claude Lancaster.

Eponine attempts to murder Hagolin but fails. Larnier intervenes on her behalf and Eponine strangles the man with a scarf. The body is dismembered and dumped, then Eponine is placed under arrest.

Claude, who is secretly Florence's lover, feels that he deserves credit for much of Lamerciere's courtroom success. He leaps at the opportunity when Eponine asks him to defend her. Lamerciere remarks that Claude and Florence could do to him exactly what the accused woman and lover Larnier did to Hagolin.

In court, Lamerciere persuades Claude to allow him to deliver the closing argument. He paints such a lurid picture of Eponine's crime that results in her conviction. His gaze at Florence makes it clear that he knows that she has been unfaithful.

== Cast ==
Credits from the AFI Catalog of Feature Films.

- Orson Welles as Hagolin/Lamerciere
- Juliette Gréco as Eponine/Florence
- Bradford Dillman as Robert Larnier/Claude Lancaster
- Alexander Knox as President
- Catherine Lacey as Mother Superior
- William Lucas as Kerstner
- Maurice Teynac as Doctor
- Austin Willis as Hurtelaut
- Cec Linder as Murzeau
- Eugene Deckers as Magre
- Yves Brainville as Prosecutor
- Vivian Matalon as Young Man
- Jacques Marin as Watchman

== Production ==
The script was credited to by producer Darryl F. Zanuck (under his frequent pseudonym "Mark Canfield"), but in his 1993 autobiography Just Tell Me When to Cry, Fleischer revealed that it was ghostwritten by the blacklisted Jules Dassin. Fleischer, Derode, and John Shepridge also contributed to the script, but were all uncredited.

Filming took place at various locations around Paris, including the Palais de Justice, the Gare de Lyon, and the Seine. Interiors were shot at Billancourt Studios and Boulogne Studios.

In an interview with American Legends, Bradford Dillman said Welles could be "hell on wheels" and that director Fleischer "didn't fool around with Orson. Nobody fooled around with Orson. He did his own thing."

== Reception ==
In a contemporary review for The New York Times, critic Howard Thompson wrote: "A determined try for something different—three performers playing six roles, as two adulterous triangles explode in a murder trial—misfires coldly and rather hollowly ... There is certainly no cause to evaluate this extremely devious, visual charade by such a brilliant courtroom yardstick as Compulsion, also involving director Fleischer, Messrs. Welles and Dillman and the Zanuck production banner. ... [T]he picture is a peculiarly bloodless affair (for all the lovingly detailed gore of the murder), archly juggling some arid dialogue and even the characterizations."

In a letter to the editors of Playboy magazine in April 1967, Darryl F. Zanuck, president of 20th Century-Fox Film Corporation, observed that "when I won three prizes for a very second-rate film called Crack in the Mirror," at the Cannes Film Festival, "[t]his dubious victory was achieved by the political activities of a group of friends who accompanied me to the festival (Orson Welles, Juliette Gréco and Françoise Sagan)."

== See also ==
- List of American films of 1960
