= Palimony in the United States =

Division of assets after the termination of a relationship

Palimony is the division of financial assets and real property on the termination of a personal live-in relationship wherein the parties are not legally married. The term "palimony" is not a legal or historical term, but rather a colloquial portmanteau of the words pal and alimony. Nevertheless, numerous secondary legal sources refer to the term, and attempt to describe its influence and implications upon actual statute law.

The term was used prominently by celebrity divorce attorney Marvin Mitchelson in 1977 when his client Michelle Triola Marvin filed an unsuccessful lawsuit against the actor Lee Marvin. While the suit was unsuccessful in this instance, the courts found that "in the absence of an express agreement, courts may look to a variety of other remedies to divide property equitably." The term had appeared earlier, in a 1927 editorial in The Odgen Standard-Examiner of Utah: "Some of the handsomest and sportiest young women in the capital belong to that Palimony Club and joke about the ex-husbands they have working for them."

It is unclear as to how many states currently expressly forbid any kind of palimony to be awarded—that is to say, how many states allow both partners in an unmarried cohabitation to expressly keep all that is under their name including income and property. It is widely recommended by legal offices across the country that, before committing to an unmarried but romantic cohabitation, the couple should enter into a legal cohabitation agreement.

== Background ==
Unlike alimony, which is typically authorized by statute, the availability of palimony to unmarried partners depends upon the existence of a clear agreement between partners concerning financial support or the sharing of property. In the absence of an enforceable agreement, an unmarried partner may have no recourse for their contribution to their partner's financial success or to a share of assets accumulated during the relationship.

In states that recognize palimony, there is variation in the factors that are considered by the court and the weighting of those factors by the court. Factors that may be considered include,

- Cohabitation
- Length of the relationship
- Commitment between partners that one would financially provide for the other for life
- Promises between partners that can be proven
- Written financial agreements
- Ability of the plaintiff to support themselves financially
- Giving up a career to provide services such as care of the home or children
- Sacrifices made by one partner to put the other partner through college
- Disparity in income

In 1981, only three states legally rejected palimony, but, as of 2025, 21 states legally reject palimony.

== Marvin v. Marvin ==
Michelle Triola spent several years living with actor Lee Marvin. After their breakup, she legally adopted the surname Marvin despite never having been married to him and claimed he had promised to support her for the rest of her life. Represented by flamboyant attorney Marvin Mitchelson, she sued Lee Marvin in Marvin v. Marvin, a high-profile civil lawsuit -- its outcome was reported in a banner headline across the top of the front page of the Los Angeles Times on April 18, 1979. Marvin was represented by his longtime attorneys at the law firm of Goldman & Kagon, including David Kagon, Mark A. Goldman, and Louis L. Goldman, who Marvin reportedly had had on retainer for more than 20 years. In the end, the California Supreme Court ruled that Triola had not proven the existence of a contract between herself and Mr. Marvin that gave her an interest in his property. Thus, the common law rule applied to the situation without alteration, and she took away from the relationship and the household what she brought to it.

The court went on to explain that, while the state abolished common-law marriage in 1896, California law recognizes non-marital relationship contracts. These contracts may be express or implied, oral or written, but they must be provable in any case. As established in cases like Trutalli vs. Meraviglia (1932) and Hill vs. Estate of Westbrook (1952), such contracts are only enforceable if they are not based upon an agreement to cohabit or provide sexual services. The courts have consistently held that while cohabitants may lawfully contract concerning property ownership and compensation for services like housekeeping, such agreements must be independent of and not in consideration for their non-marital relationship. Eventually, the California Court of Appeal ruled that, since Michelle Triola and Lee Marvin never had a contract, she was not entitled to any money.

Due to the notoriety of the case, subsequent lawsuits involving cohabitating but unmarried parties trying to enforce promises of support or property rights came to be known as Marvin actions or Marvin claims.

== Notable cases ==
- Rock musician Peter Frampton was sued by Penelope J. "Penny" McCall in 1976. McCall asked for half of Frampton’s earnings during the five years that they were together. According to McCall, she gave up her job as a rock promoter and devoted herself full-time to Frampton, right at the time that he achieved superstar status. A New York judge ruled that Frampton and McCall never intended to marry each other and "never held themselves out to the public as husband and wife" and dismissed her complaint on the grounds that to act otherwise would condone adultery. The case set precedent in New York state.
- Singer Rod Stewart was sued by actress Britt Ekland in 1977. She settled soon after for an amount described as "substantial."
- Actor Nick Nolte was sued by model Karen Louise Eklund in 1978. The suit was dropped in 1983 in return for the actor's continuing friendship and his agreement to not pursue a cross-complaint.
- Tennis player Billie Jean King was sued by Marilyn Barnett in 1981.
- Actor Clint Eastwood was sued by former actress Sondra Locke for $70 million in 1989. The case was described as precedent-setting since Locke's unconsummated 1967 marriage to homosexual Gordon Anderson had remained legally intact the entire 14 years she cohabited with Eastwood. Eastwood argued that, because Locke was married to somebody else for the duration of their affair, she shouldn't be entitled to his assets: "Matrimony is recognized by the state, by the government and by every church in the world. If palimony makes the same relationship, does that mean there's no matrimony?" The exes reached a settlement in 1990, only for Locke to hit back with a fraud suit five years later, leading the Supreme Court of California to rule that judges should not exclude the press and public from civil trials.
- Tennis player Martina Navratilova was sued by Judy Nelson in 1991; they reached a settlement in 1992.
- In 1996, Van Cliburn was sued by former partner Thomas Zaremba for a share of his income and assets following a 17-year relationship ending in 1994. Zaremba's palimony case was dismissed for lack of written agreement, along with claims for emotional distress and that Cliburn subjected him to the fear of AIDS through Cliburn's alleged unprotected liaisons with third parties.
- In 2004, comedian Bill Maher was sued for US$9 million by his ex-girlfriend, Nancy "Coco" Johnsen. On May 2, 2005, a California Superior Court judge dismissed the case.

== In popular culture ==
Country singer Leon Rausch's song "Palimony" went to #81 on the Billboard Country charts in 1980.

Stuck on You! is a 1982 comedy film which follows estranged couple Bill and Carol, who are in a palimony suit against each other.

In the 1996 film The Birdcage, which is adapted from the play La Cage Aux Folles, Albert Goldman (played by Nathan Lane) asks for a palimony agreement from his partner, Armand Goldman (Robin Williams).

Palimony was used as a form of revenge by the Bridgette Wilson character, Chelsea Turner, against her character's boyfriend Seth Winnick (played by French Stewart) in the 1999 film Love Stinks.

Included in the liner notes for Bon Jovi's Slippery When Wet album is a thank you to the group's "expensive lawyers" for helping them to negotiate alimony and palimony payments.

Seeking palimony was an option considered by the lawyer Jane Bingum (Brooke Elliott) during an episode of Drop Dead Diva, where one man married two women. The women ultimately chose to sue their husband for fraud.

== States with recent palimony use (since the year 2000) ==
- California (2010)
- Colorado (2012)
- Georgia (2015)
- Hawaii (2015)
- Illinois (2015)
- Maryland (2010)
- Michigan (2006)
- Nevada (2012)
- New York (2004)
- South Carolina (2004)
- Washington recently legalized palimony in 2007 (2015)

Also, palimony law is very similar to common-law marriage law. Common-law marriage in the United States (marriage without having an official marriage ceremony) is recognized in 10 states: Colorado, DC, Iowa, Kansas, Montana, Oklahoma, Rhode Island, South Carolina, Texas and Utah.

== States with historical palimony cases ==
- Alaska has recognized palimony based upon principles of contract.
- Arizona recognizes palimony, and has awarded palimony. The awarding of palimony in Arizona is "rare" however. Most recent pro-palimony literature/case: (1986)
- California recognizes palimony, and has awarded palimony. California may also award property palimony due to "oral contracts." California has been listed as one of the three most "liberal" palimony laws, in addition to Washington State and Minnesota. Most recent pro-palimony literature/case: (2010)
- Colorado recognizes palimony. Most recent pro-palimony literature/case: (2012)
- Delaware: No anti-palimony law exists in Delaware, but no literature could be found in regards to successful palimony lawsuits in Delaware. Most recent pro-palimony literature/case (none)
- Florida does not recognize palimony rights.
- Hawaii recognizes palimony, and has awarded palimony.
- Idaho- The only information in regard to palimony in Idaho was from blogs. According to these, palimony is neither formally legal nor illegal, and may be sued for.
- Illinois- Although Illinois is generally considered to be a state that does not recognize palimony, that appears to be changing. "The Appellate Court of Illinois has found that a state court judge who is a physician’s former same-sex partner can assert an unjust enrichment legal claim — that is, a palimony claim — to seek compensation for her financial contributions toward both the home they shared and the physician's professional practice."
- Indiana- 'Palimony, per se, is not awarded by Indiana courts."
- Iowa will recognize palimony if common-law marriage is proven.
- Maryland- While palimony actions are not permitted in Maryland, Maryland recognizes certain types of palimony-type actions. For example, if evidence that a promise to marry a pregnant individual has been breached, "damages" may be awarded. Also, "oral contracts" may be used to divide property (see previous citation).
- Minnesota- In 1980, Minnesota passed two statutes nicknamed the "anti-palimony statutes." These require written contracts in order to award palimony for a cohabiting plaintiff. However, if a cohabiting partner "believes" that they are married, then they are referred to as a "Putative Spouse", which would give them the same rights as a legally married person in a divorce proceeding. Minnesota has been listed as one of the three most "liberal" palimony states, in addition to Washington State and California.
- Nevada- Nevada recognizes palimony, and has awarded palimony.
- New Mexico- New Mexico recognizes palimony when an "oral agreement" has been made. New Mexico also recognizes the right to palimony when couples that qualified for common law marriage in another state move to New Mexico, but New Mexico itself does not recognize common law marriage from its own state.
- New York- Obtaining palimony in New York is a "daunting task". Also, "oral contracts that are vague or indefinite will not pass muster." But another legal website states that if there was an "oral agreement," there may still be a case.
- North Carolina will generally enforce "implied contracts" between unmarried couples.
- North Dakota- Very little information in regard to palimony in North Dakota is available online. However, palimony attorneys are located in North Dakota.
- Ohio- "Palimony is not recognized in Ohio." However, Ohio can recognize "implied" cohabitation contracts, resulting in palimony-type awards.
- Oregon will look at couples' "oral statements and conduct over time" in order to determine palimony possibilities.
- Pennsylvania has recognized palimony in the past, and has awarded palimony, as noted in the case of Mullen v. Suchko (although this case occurred in 1980, when common-law marriage was still legal in PA, but common-law marriage was barred in PA in 2005) Although only a "tacit", or implied/oral, agreement is required in order for palimony to be awarded in PA, there is no online documentation online of any palimony cases after 1990. "Success often means proving the existence of an oral contract." -Quote from a Philadelphia lawyer.
- Rhode Island supports a type of palimony called "unjust enrichment," where a paramour may lay claim to property that they do not own.
- Texas law allows for some recognition of palimony. The Texas Family Code does not provide for "palimony.” This means you cannot gain rights under the Texas Family Code because you lived with someone absent a valid marriage. You can, however, create an agreement "on consideration of nonmarital conjugal cohabitation" under the Texas Business and Commerce Code (Tex. Bus. & Com. Code § 26.01(b)(3)).
- Utah has no palimony laws. However, palimony lawyers do exist in Utah.
- Vermont- No information in regard to Vermont palimony could be found online, except on blogs. Accordingly, "oral" contracts will be considered during palimony suits.
- Virginia does have palimony lawyers.
- "Washington courts reserve the power to equitable redistribute property from one unmarried partner to another acquired during a committed intimate relationship." Washington has been listed as one of the three most "liberal" palimony states, in addition to California and Minnesota.
- Wisconsin recognizes certain types of palimony. "Under Wisconsin law, cohabitants may bring a civil unjust enrichment claim upon termination of the relationship. Watts v. Watts, 137 Wis. 2d 506, 405 N.W.2d 303 (1987); Lawlis v. Thompson, 137 Wis. 2d 490, 405 N.W.2d 317 (1987)." However, "unlike maintenance, where the parties were married, in a cohabitation, performing household services does not give rise to claim for reimbursement. Rather, services must be linked to an accumulation of wealth or assets during the relationship. Waage v. Borer, 188 Wis.2d 324, 525 N.W.2d 96 (Ct. App. 1994). There must be proof of specific contributions that directly led to an increase in assets or accumulation of wealth. Ward v. Jahnke, 220 Wis. 2d 539, 583 N.W.2d.656 (Ct. App. 1998). (previous citation). "Wisconsin does not allow a palimony." (previous citation). a cohabitation lawsuit is a civil case, without standard forms and processes. As a result, if lawyers are needed in a cohabitation case, the cost may be significantly higher, as drafting pleadings is more expensive than simply completing forms. In addition, jury trials may be available, which could significantly increase the costs." (previous citation).
- Wyoming recognizes certain types of palimony.

== Palimony-free states ==
- Alabama- No information could be located online in regard to palimony in Alabama.
- Arkansas- "Generally, unmarried couples are not afforded any rights or protections, unlike married couples, beyond contract law."
- Connecticut- "No right to palimony exists under Connecticut law", unless there is a written contract.
- District of Columbia- No relevant information was found online in regard to palimony in DC.
- Florida: palimony is not recognized by the State of Florida
- Georgia does not recognize any form of palimony. No cases of the awarding of palimony, neither financial or property related, could be found online.
- Kansas- No information on Kansas palimony was found online.
- Kentucky- No information on Kentucky palimony was found online, except for on blogs. According to these, Kentucky "does not recognize palimony claims. Kentucky appellate courts have repeatedly refused to create property rights solely on the basis of unmarried cohabitation, even when the parties' relationship closely resembled marriage. In Glidewell v. Glidewell, 790 S.W.2d 925 (Ky.App. 1990), the Kentucky Court of Appeals held that no property rights arose from a relationship in which the parties held themselves out as husband and wife and filed joint tax returns because none of the states in which the parties lived permitted common-law marriage. In Murphy v. Bowen, 756 S.W.2d 149 (Ky.App. 1988), the same court upheld a trial court's summary judgment against Pearl Murphy, who claimed an interest based solely on evidence of a "meretricious relationship", but it is not illegal to file a claim for palimony.
- Louisiana does not recognize palimony law, only contract law.
- Maine is one of only three states that does not recognize any form of palimony. No cases of the awarding of palimony, neither financial or property related, could be found online.
- Massachusetts does not recognize palimony. "No matter what reason causes the end of the relationship, Massachusetts does not recognize any rights for a couple who cohabit without marriage. This means that no property division of separately owned property. No palimony (or alimony). No rights if your partner is hospitalized. If one person in the relationship sacrifices employment to maintain the home or to care for children, there is no compensation for the lost earning capacity. If one partner dies, there is no right to inherit from the estate. Massachusetts does not allow common law marriage so no matter how long a couple live together, cohabitation won't ever change into a marriage without performing a wedding ceremony." Historically, some people who separate after long periods of cohabitation have tried to obtain property rights or support by litigation. While palimony is not recognized in Massachusetts, there are some legal theories that may give some limited benefits in this situation. These theories can result in some property rights but only in very limited factual circumstances and only after expensive litigation. A well drafted cohabitation agreement should prevent such litigation. While the Commonwealth of Massachusetts won't create protections for cohabitants, the parties can create their own protections by executing legal documents such as a cohabitation agreement and an estate plan.
- Michigan- While Michigan's official law does not recognize palimony, Michigan has recognized certain types of palimony-like actions. For example, palimony was awarded because the plaintiff worked for the defendant.
- Mississippi- "Palimony is not recognized in Mississippi." Palimony issues are almost non-existent with the exception of joint property ventures and investments.
- Missouri does not recognize palimony. However, an ex partner may have other ways to get money or property from an ex-lover. Lawsuits in regard to this are legal but are "rarely brought." Cohabitation agreements will provide protections in regard to this.
- Montana- No reasonable information in regard to palimony in Montana could be found online.
- Nebraska- There are no clear references as to Nebraska's acceptance or rejection of palimony awards, but it appears that Nebraska does not recognize palimony unless there is a written agreement. The biggest case regarding palimony is Kinkenon v. Hue. The plaintiff was not awarded any part of the home that the defendant built for them prior to the end of the relationship.
- New Hampshire does not appear to recognize palimony, according to the Joan S. v John S. case. Also with Tapley v. Tapley
- New Jersey no longer recognizes palimony rights in relationships started after 2010, since the passage of the Statute of Frauds legislation. However, New Jersey does recognize palimony with relationships that started prior to 2010 (same reference).
- Oklahoma does not appear to recognize palimony, according to the Matter of Estate of Carroll case.
- South Carolina does not grant palimony.
- South Dakota- South Dakota does not recognize palimony.
- Tennessee does not recognize palimony.
- West Virginia- Even though "this is not a state where you can award palimony", cohabitation agreements are encouraged in order to discourage palimony-type lawsuits.
