= Charles Aidman =

American actor (1925–1993)

- Aidman in 1967
- Born: Charles Leonard Aidman; January 21, 1925; Frankfort, Indiana, U.S.
- Died: November 7, 1993 (aged 68); Beverly Hills, California, U.S.
- Resting place: Pierce Brothers Westwood Village Memorial Park and Mortuary, Los Angeles
- Other name: Chuck Aidman
- Education: DePauw University; Indiana University
- Occupation: Actor
- Years active: 1952–1992
- Spouse: Frances Garman (m. 1957; div. 1967) Betty Hyatt Linton (m. 1969)

Charles Leonard Aidman (January 21, 1925 – November 7, 1993) was an American stage, film and television actor.

== Early life ==
Aidman was born in Frankfort, Indiana, the son of George E. and Etta (Kwitny) Aidman. Aidman graduated from Frankfort High School and attended DePauw University prior to serving as a gunnery officer in the United States Navy during World War II. After the war, he returned to his home state and graduated from Indiana University.

== Career ==
Aidman guest-starred on NBC's The Virginian in the episode "The Devil's Children" and twice on the NBC Western series The Californians. He also appeared twice on Richard Diamond, Private Detective. He portrayed a bounty hunter on ABC's Western series Black Saddle. He was cast in CBS's fantasy drama The Twilight Zone in the episodes "And When the Sky Was Opened" and "Little Girl Lost". He also guest-starred on other Western series, including the ABC/Warner Bros. series Colt .45; ABC's The Rebel; CBS's Gunsmoke (in 5 episodes); NBC's Riverboat (as Frank Paxton in the episode "The Fight at New Canal"); NBC's The Americans; CBS's Trackdown (as Len Starbuck in "The Samaritan"); and CBS's Johnny Ringo (as Jeffrey Blake in "The Stranger").

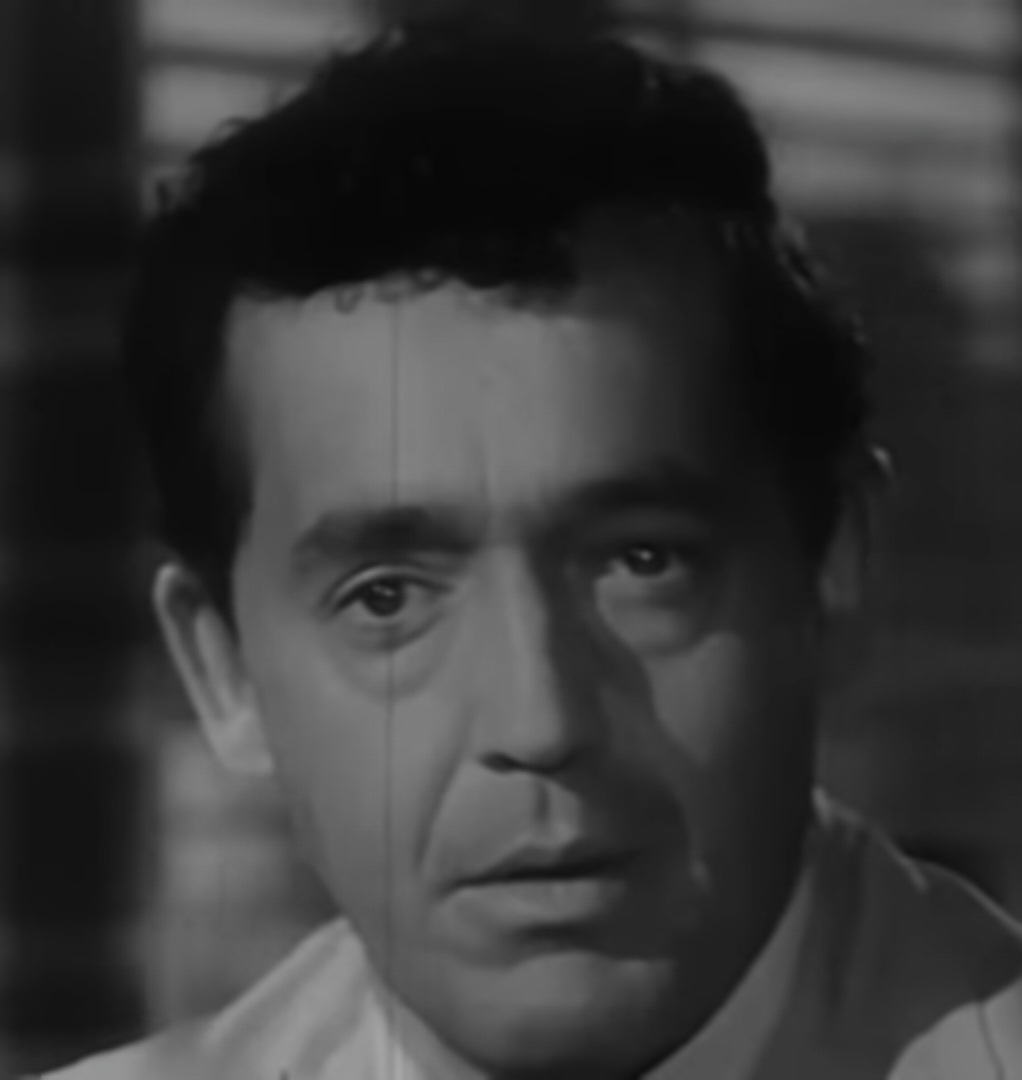
Aidman in an episode of One Step Beyond (1960)

Aidman guest starred on the NBC children's Western Fury, in episodes of the ABC/WB crime drama Bourbon Street Beat, and in the syndicated aviation adventure series Whirlybirds. He appeared in 1959 and 1960 in different roles on three episodes of the syndicated crime drama U.S. Marshal. In 1960, Aidman made a guest appearance on the CBS courtroom drama Perry Mason (as Arthur Siddons in "The Case of the Gallant Grafter"). Aidman also guest starred in a 1961 episode of the Western TV series Bonanza (as Jim Applegate in "The Rival").

In 1961, in the Peter Gunn episode "Witness in the Window", Aidman hires Peter Gunn to investigate a woman who is blackmailing him over alleged sexual improprieties that he denies. In the NBC Western series The Tall Man, in the episode "Shadow of the Past", Aidman was cast as Ben Wiley, the father of Sue Wiley, the latest girlfriend of Billy the Kid.

In 1962 and 1963, he made two appearances on The Dick Van Dyke Show. Also in 1963, Aidman was cast as George Ellsworth, an official with the United States Embassy in Warsaw, Poland, in the three-part episode "Security Risk" of the CBS anthology series GE True. He also played a sex-education teacher in the episode of Slattery's People "Do the Ignorant Sleep in Pure White Sheets"? Also in 1963, Aidman adapted Spoon River Anthology by poet Edgar Lee Masters into a theater production. It is a production that is still performed.

In 1965, he played a teacher in a sixth-season episode of The Andy Griffith Show. He appeared on the NBC Western series The Road West in its 1966 episode "The Lean Years". That same year, Aidman played scientist Dr. Hollis, who turns into a werewolf in an episode of Voyage to the Bottom of the Sea. He also guest-starred on CBS's The Wild Wild West during the series's fourth season in a recurring role as Jeremy Pike, one of several characters temporarily replacing Artemus Gordon as Jim West's partner. In 1968, he appeared in ABC's The Invaders as research scientist Julian Reed, in the episode "The Pit". In 1970, Aidman appeared in Hawaii Five-O as Dr. Royce, and in 1973 Aidman played in the episode "Seance" in Emergency!.

In 1974, he introduced the character Louis Willis (later known as Tom Willis), father-in-law-to-be of Lionel Jefferson, in the February 1974 episode of CBS's All in the Family "Lionel's Engagement". In 1977, Aidman played the father of Elmer Dobkins in an episode of Little House on the Prairie. Aidman appeared in an episode of the police drama Nakia. Also in 1977, in "The Grim Reaper" episode of M*A*S*H, he portrayed Colonel Bloodworth, a callous, sadistic commander who takes pleasure in predicting casualties and reducing his troops to statistics. From 1985 to 1987, Aidman was the narrator of the revival of The Twilight Zone series (until he was replaced by Robin Ward).

His film roles include Pork Chop Hill (1959), War Hunt (1962), Hour of the Gun (1967), Countdown (1968), Angel, Angel, Down We Go (1969), Tell Them Willie Boy Is Here (1969), Adam at 6 A.M. (1970), Kotch (1971), Dirty Little Billy (1972), Deliver Us from Evil (1973), Twilight's Last Gleaming (1977), Zoot Suit (1981), Uncommon Valor (1983) and Innerspace (1987), his final feature-film appearance.

== Personal life and death ==
Aidman was married to model Frances Garman. In November 1993, he died of cancer in Beverly Hills, California. He is interred in the Room of Prayer at Westwood Village Memorial Park Cemetery in Los Angeles.

== Select Filmography ==
Year	Title	Role	Notes
1956	The Wrong Man	Jail Medical Attendant	Uncredited role
1959	Pork Chop Hill	Lieutenant Harrold	
1959	One Step Beyond	Carl Archer	S1 E6, "Epilogue"
1961	Gunsmoke	Dack	S6 E23, About Chester
1962	War Hunt	Captain Wallace Pratt	
1962	The Dick Van Dyke Show	Glen Jameson	
1967	Countdown	Gus	
1967	Hour of the Gun	Horace Sullivan	
1969	Angel, Angel, Down We Go	Willy Steele	
1969	Tell Them Willie Boy Is Here	Judge Benby	
1969	Secrets of the Pirate's Inn	Carl Buchanan	
1970	Menace on the Mountain	Jed McIver	
1970	Adam at 6 A.M.	Mr. Hopper	
1971	Kotch	Gerald Kotcher	
1972	The Rookies	Arnold Sanders	
1972	Dirty Little Billy	Ben Antrim	
1973	Deliver Us from Evil	Arnold Fleming	
1977	Twilight's Last Gleaming	Bernstein	
1978	The House of the Dead	Detective Malcolm Toliver	Also known as Alien Zone
1981	Zoot Suit	George Shibley	
1982	The American Adventure	Father	Voice role
1983	Uncommon Valor	Senator Hastings	
1983	Happy Birthday Mickey Mouse	Narrator	Voice role
1984	From Disney, with Love	Narrator	Voice role
1984	Disney's Salute to Mom	Narrator	Voice role
1987	Innerspace	Speaker At Banquet	
