= Bradford Dillman =

American actor (1930–2018)

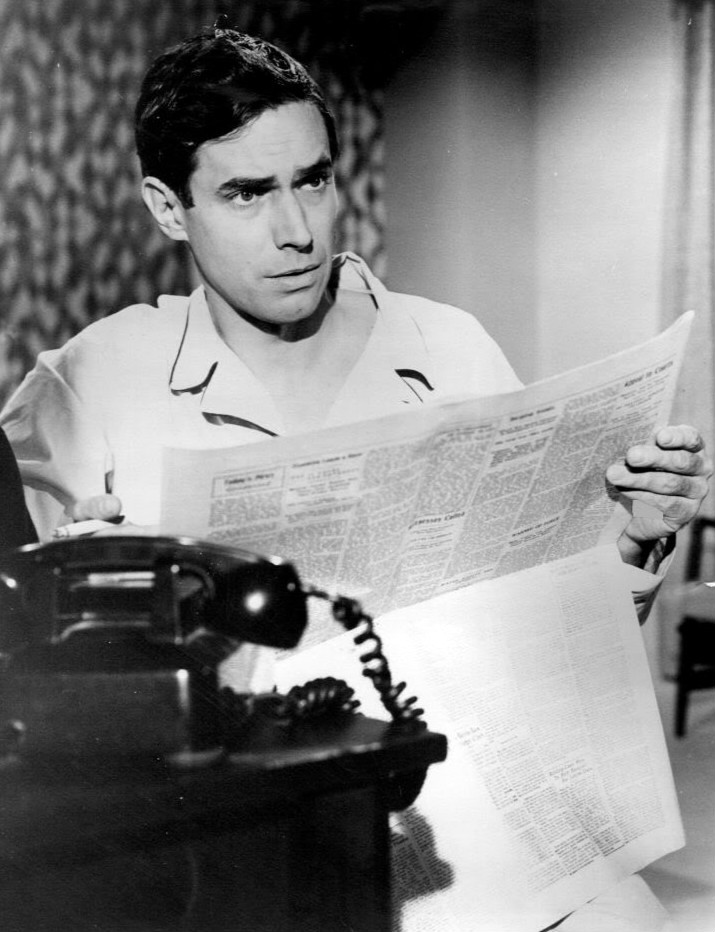
- Dillman on an episode of The F.B.I. (1966).
- Born: April 14, 1930; San Francisco, California, U.S.
- Died: January 16, 2018 (aged 87); Santa Barbara, California, U.S.
- Education: Yale University (B.A., 1951); Actors Studio
- Occupations: Actor; author
- Years active: 1953–1995
- Spouses: Frieda Harding McIntosh (m. 1956; div. 1962) Suzy Parker (m. 1963; died 2003)
- Children: 5
- Relatives: Aimée Crocker (cousin)
- Military career
- Allegiance: United States of America
- Branch: United States Marine Corps
- Service years: 1951-1953
- Rank: 1st Lieutenant
- Conflicts: Korean War

Signature
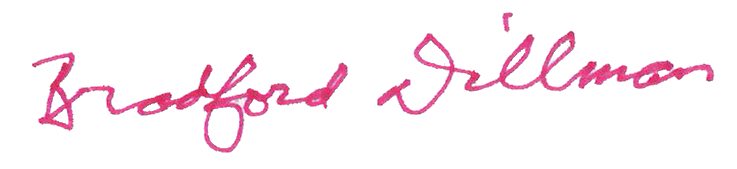

Bradford Dillman (April 14, 1930 – January 16, 2018) was an American actor and author, who appeared in over 140 film, television, and stage productions between 1953 and 1995. He originated the role of Edmund Tyrone in Eugene O'Neill's Long Day's Journey into Night, earning a Theatre World Award, and won the 1959 Cannes Film Festival Award for Best Actor for his performance in the film Compulsion. He was also a Golden Globe Award winner and a Primetime Emmy Award nominee.

== Early life ==
Bradford Dillman was born on April 14, 1930, in San Francisco, the son of Dean Dillman, a stockbroker, and Josephine (née Moore). Bradford's paternal grandparents were Charles Francis Dillman and Stella Borland Dean. He studied at Town School for Boys and St. Ignatius High School from which he graduated in 1949. He later attended the Hotchkiss School in Connecticut, where he became involved with school theatre productions. While at Yale University, he enlisted in the U.S. Naval Reserve in 1948. While a student, he was a member of the Yale Dramatic Association, Fence Club, Torch Honor Society, The Society of Orpheus and Bacchus, WYBC and Berzelius. He graduated from Yale in 1951 with a BA in English Literature.

=== Military service ===
After graduation, he entered the United States Marine Corps as an officer candidate, training at Parris Island. He was commissioned as a second lieutenant in the Marine Corps in September 1951. As he was preparing to deploy to the war in Korea, his orders were changed, and he spent the rest of his time in the Marine Corps, from 1951 to 1953, teaching communication in the Instructors' Orientation Course. He was discharged in 1953 with the rank of first lieutenant.

== Career ==
Studying with the Actors Studio, Dillman spent several seasons apprenticing with the Sharon Playhouse in Sharon, Connecticut. He was offered a scholarship to the Royal Academy of Dramatic Art in London, but declined it to star in an Off-Broadway production of The Scarecrow in 1953.

During 1955, he appeared in an episode of the television series The Big Picture as an MP patrolling the city of Augusta, Georgia.

=== Broadway ===
Dillman first performed in a Broadway play as part of the U.S. premiere cast of Eugene O'Neill's Long Day's Journey into Night in November 1956. He portrayed the author's alter-ego character Edmund Tyrone and won a Theatre World Award for his performance. The production also featured Fredric March, Florence Eldridge and Jason Robards Jr., and played for 390 performances until March 1958.

In 1957, Katharine Cornell cast him in a Hallmark Hall of Fame television production of Robert E. Sherwood's Pulitzer Prize winning 1940 play, There Shall Be No Night.

=== 20th Century Fox ===
Dillman was cast in the movie melodrama A Certain Smile (1958). He followed this with In Love and War (1958), a war movie featuring many of 20th Century Fox's young contract players, for which he earned a Golden Globe award. It was a financial success. So too was Compulsion (1959), featuring Dillman, Dean Stockwell and Orson Welles for producer Richard Zanuck and director Richard Fleischer.

Dillman shared an award for Best Actor with Stockwell and Welles at the Cannes Film Festival. After making the movie Circle of Deception (1960) in London, Dillman was reunited with Welles, Fleischer and Zanuck for Crack in the Mirror (1960), filmed in Paris. It was unsuccessful. Back in Hollywood, Fox cast Dillman in support of Yves Montand and Lee Remick in Sanctuary (1961). They also had him in the title role in Francis of Assisi (1961).

=== Television ===
When he quit Fox, Dillman mostly concentrated on television. He guest-starred in a 1963 episode of The Virginian, titled: "Echo of Another Day", and he guest-starred in the 1966 12 O'Clock High episode "Twenty-Fifth Mission". He co-featured with Diana Hyland in the Alfred Hitchcock Hour episode "To Catch A Butterfly" in February 1963, and with Barbara Barrie in the 1964 Hitchcock Hour episode "Isabel". He appeared in seven episodes of Dr. Kildare (1964–66) and 26 of Court Martial (1965–66). He guest-featured in television series such as The F.B.I. (six episodes), Ironside (two episodes), Shane, The Name of the Game, Columbo, The Wild Wild West, Night Gallery, The Eleventh Hour, Wagon Train, The Greatest Show on Earth, Breaking Point, Mission: Impossible (two episodes), The Mary Tyler Moore Show, Cannon, Barnaby Jones (six episodes), Three for the Road, Wonder Woman and a two-part episode of The Man from U.N.C.L.E., which was made into the feature movie The Helicopter Spies (1968).

Dillman appeared twice in the Western television series The Big Valley (1965–69), once in season two, episode 15, titled "Day of the Comet", broadcast December 26, 1966; and the second time in season three, episode 9, titled "A Noose is Waiting", which was broadcast November 13, 1967. He appeared in occasional movies during this period, including A Rage to Live (1965), Sergeant Ryker (1968), and The Bridge at Remagen (1969).

Dillman played painter Richard Pickman in the television adaptation of H. P. Lovecraft's 1926 story, Pickman's Model, presented as the opening act of a December 1971 Night Gallery episode. In 1970 Bradford played the role of a U.S. Army captain in the TV film Suppose They Gave A War and Nobody Came. He starred as Tony Goodland in "The Greenhouse Jungle", the second episode of the second season of Columbo (initially aired on October 15, 1972). He also starred as the sadistic hunter Michael Sutton in "The Snare", the ninth episode in the third season of The Incredible Hulk (initially aired on December 7, 1979).

=== Later career and author ===
Dillman appeared in made-for-television movies such as Fear No Evil (1969), Moon of the Wolf (1972), and Deliver Us from Evil (1973). His film work included Escape from the Planet of the Apes (1971), The Way We Were (1973), Gold (1974), Bug (1975), The Enforcer (1976), The Swarm (1978), Piranha (1978), Sudden Impact (1983), and Lords of the Deep (1989). He appeared in 10 episodes of Falcon Crest (1982–83), and 2 of Dynasty (1984). His last known acting appearance was an episode of Murder, She Wrote in 1995, his eighth guest appearance on the series.

Dillman's football fan book, Inside The New York Giants, was published in 1995. An autobiography, Are You Anybody?: An Actor's Life, was published in 1997.

== Personal life ==
"Bradford Dillman" was the actor's real name. He'd said "It [Bradford Dillman] sounded like a distinguished, phony, theatrical name -- so I kept it." He lived for many years in the 1928-built Las Armas estate, designed by architects George Washington Smith and Lutah Maria Riggs, in Montecito, California.. From 1956 to 1962, he was married to Frieda Harding and had two children with her, Pamela and Jeffrey.

During the production of Circle of Deception (1960), he met fashion model turned actress Suzy Parker. They struck up a romance and Dillman eventually divorced Harding. Dillman and Parker married on April 20, 1963, and had three children, Dinah, Charles, and Christopher. The marriage lasted until Parker died on May 3, 2003, at their Montecito home, after a long battle with kidney failure.

Dillman was a distant cousin of the eccentric author and heiress Aimee Crocker. Crocker's cousin on her mother’s side was Charles Frances Dillman, grandfather of Bradford, who was president of the D.O. Mills National Bank and represented both Aimée’s and sister Jennie’s extensive business interests in California.

Dillman was involved in fundraising for medical research .

=== Death ===
Dillman died in Santa Barbara, California, on January 16, 2018, aged 87, due to complications from pneumonia.

== Partial filmography ==
=== Film ===
- A Certain Smile (1958) as Bertrand Griot
- In Love and War (1958) as Alan Newcombe
- Compulsion (1959) as Arthur A. Straus
- Crack in the Mirror (1960) as Larnier / Claude
- Circle of Deception (1960) as Capt. Paul Raine
- Sanctuary (1961) as Gowan Stevens
- Francis of Assisi (1961) as Francis Bernardone of Assisi
- Monstrosity (1963) as Narrator (voice, uncredited)
- A Rage to Live (1965) as Sidney Tate
- The Plainsman (1966) as Lt. Stiles
- The Helicopter Spies (1968) as Luther Sebastian (archive footage)
- Sergeant Ryker (1968) as Capt. David Young (uses archive footage) This was a recut version of a 1963 TV film first shown as a two-part episode of NBC's Kraft Suspense Theatre, which spawned the series Court Martial
- Jigsaw (1968) as Jonathan Fields
- The Bridge at Remagen (1969) as Major Barnes
- Mastermind (1969; unreleased until 1976) as Jabez Link
- Suppose They Gave a War and Nobody Came (1970) as Capt. Myerson
- Brother John (1971) as Lloyd Thomas
- The Mephisto Waltz (1971) as Bill Delancey
- Escape from the Planet of the Apes (1971) as Dr. Lewis Dixon
- The Resurrection of Zachary Wheeler (1971) as Sen. Clayton Zachary Wheeler
- The Way We Were (1973) as J.J.
- The Iceman Cometh (1973) as Willie Oban
- Chosen Survivors (1974) as Peter Macomber
- 99 and 44/100% Dead (1974) as Big Eddie
- Gold (1974) as Manfred Steyner
- A Black Ribbon for Deborah (1974) as Michel Lagrange
- Bug (1975) as James Parmiter
- The Enforcer (1976) as Capt. Jerome McKay
- One Away (1976) as Ruben Bass
- The Amsterdam Kill (1977) as Howard Odums
- The Lincoln Conspiracy (1977) as John Wilkes Booth
- The Swarm (1978) as Major Baker
- Piranha (1978) as Paul Grogan
- Guyana: Crime of the Century (1979) as Dr. Gary Shaw
- Love and Bullets (1979) as Jim Brickman
- Running Scared (1980) as Arthur Jaeger
- Sudden Impact (1983) as Captain Briggs
- Treasure of the Amazon (1985) as Clark
- Man Outside (1987) as Frank Simmons
- Lords of the Deep (1989) as Dobler
- Heroes Stand Alone (1989) as Walt Simmons

=== Television ===
- Alfred Hitchcock Presents (1963) (Season 1 Episode 19: "To Catch a Butterfly") as Bill Nelson
- Alfred Hitchcock Presents (1964) (Season 2 Episode 31: "Isabel") as Howard Clements
- Mission: Impossible (1968, TV series) as Paul Shipherd
- Fear No Evil (1969, TV Movie) as Paul Varney
- Black Water Gold (1970, TV Movie) as Lyle Fawcett
- Night Gallery (1971) (episode: "Pickman's Model") as Richard Upton Pickman
- Five Desperate Women (1971, TV Movie) as Jim Meeker
- Moon of the Wolf (1972, TV movie) as Andrew Rodanthe
- Mission: Impossible (1972, TV series) as Larry Edison
- Deliver Us from Evil (1973, TV Movie) as Steven Dennis
- The Disappearance of Flight 412 (1974, TV Movie) as Maj. Mike Dunning
- The Hostage Heart (1977, TV movie) as Dr. Eric Lake
- The Memory of Eva Ryker (1980, TV Movie) as Jason Eddington
- The Legend of Walks Far Woman (1982, TV Movie) as Singer

== Stage credits ==
Year	Title	Role	Venue
1953	Pygmalion	Freddie	Sharon Playhouse, Sharon, CT
1953	Candida	Marchbanks	Sharon Playhouse, Sharon, CT
1953	You Touched Me	Hadrian	Sharon Playhouse, Sharon, CT
1953	The Scarecrow	Richard Talbot	Theatre de Lys, New York
1954	The Madwoman of Chaillot	Pierre	Sharon Playhouse, Sharon, CT
1954	Death of a Salesman	Happy Loman	Sharon Playhouse, Sharon, CT
1954	The Browning Version	Young Teacher	Sharon Playhouse, Sharon, CT
1954	Night Must Fall	Danny	Sharon Playhouse, Sharon, CT
1955	Third Person	Kip Ames	President Theatre, New York
1955	Inherit the Wind	Ensemble member	National Theatre, New York
1955	The Corn Is Green	Morgan	Sharon Playhouse, Sharon, CT
1955	The Barretts of Wimpole Street	Octavius	Sharon Playhouse, Sharon, CT
1955	Ring Round the Moon	Hugo/Frédéric	Sharon Playhouse, Sharon, CT
1955	Counsellor-at-Law	The Radical	Sharon Playhouse, Sharon, CT
1956	The Rainmaker	Jimmy	Sharon Playhouse, Sharon, CT
1956–58	Long Day's Journey into Night	Edmund Tyrone	Helen Hayes Theatre, New York
1962	The Fun Couple	Gill Stanford	Lyceum Theatre, New York

== Awards and nominations ==
Institution	Year	Category	Work	Result	Ref.
Cannes Film Festival	1959	Best Actor	Compulsion	Won (Note: Shared with Dean Stockwell and Orson Welles.)	
Daytime Emmy Awards	1975	Outstanding Actor in a Daytime Drama Special	The ABC Afternoon Playbreak ("Last Bride of Salem")	Won	
Golden Globe Awards	1959	New Star of the Year – Actor	In Love and War	Won (Note: Shared with John Gavin for A Time to Love and a Time to Die and Efrem Zimbalist Jr. for Too Much, Too Soon.)	
Primetime Emmy Awards	1963	Outstanding Single Performance by a Lead Actor	Alcoa Premiere ("The Voice of Charlie Pont")	Nominated	
Theatre World Award	1957	—N/a	Long Day's Journey into Night	Won	
