= Ben Goldman =

Ben Goldman may refer to:

- Ben M. Goldman (1883–1952), American entertainment lawyer
- Ben F. Goldman Jr. (1909–1981), American entertainment lawyer

== See also ==
- Benjamin Goldman (born 1960), environmental advisor to the Clinton Administration
