= Raymond Leslie Goldman =

American writer (1895–1950)

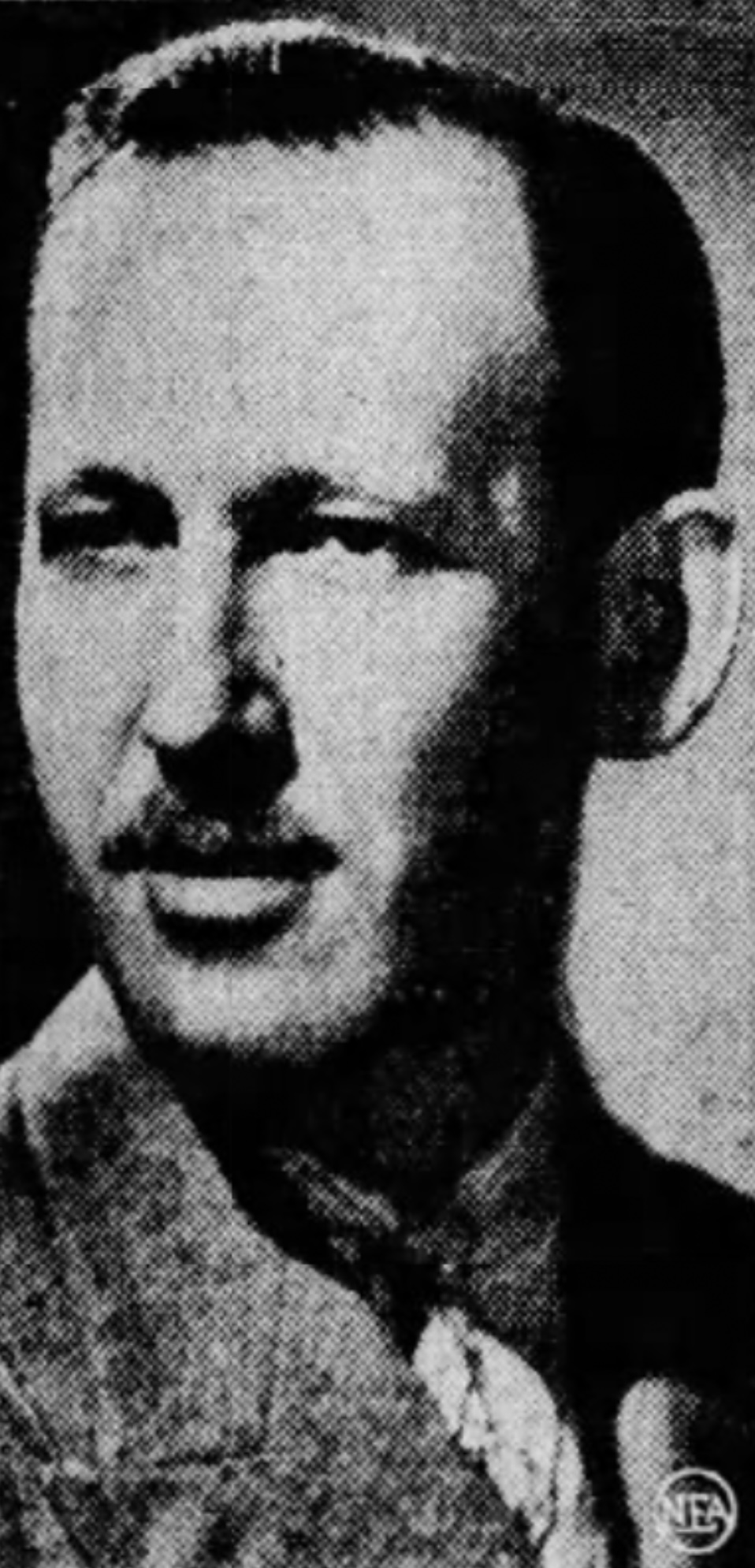
- Born: 1895
- Died: 1950 (aged 54–55)
- Relatives: Louis L. Goldman (nephew); Ben F. Goldman Jr. (nephew); Jeffrey D. Goldman (great-grandnephew)

Raymond Leslie Goldman (1895–1950) was an American author of short stories and detective novel. He almost always signed his works R. L. Goldman.

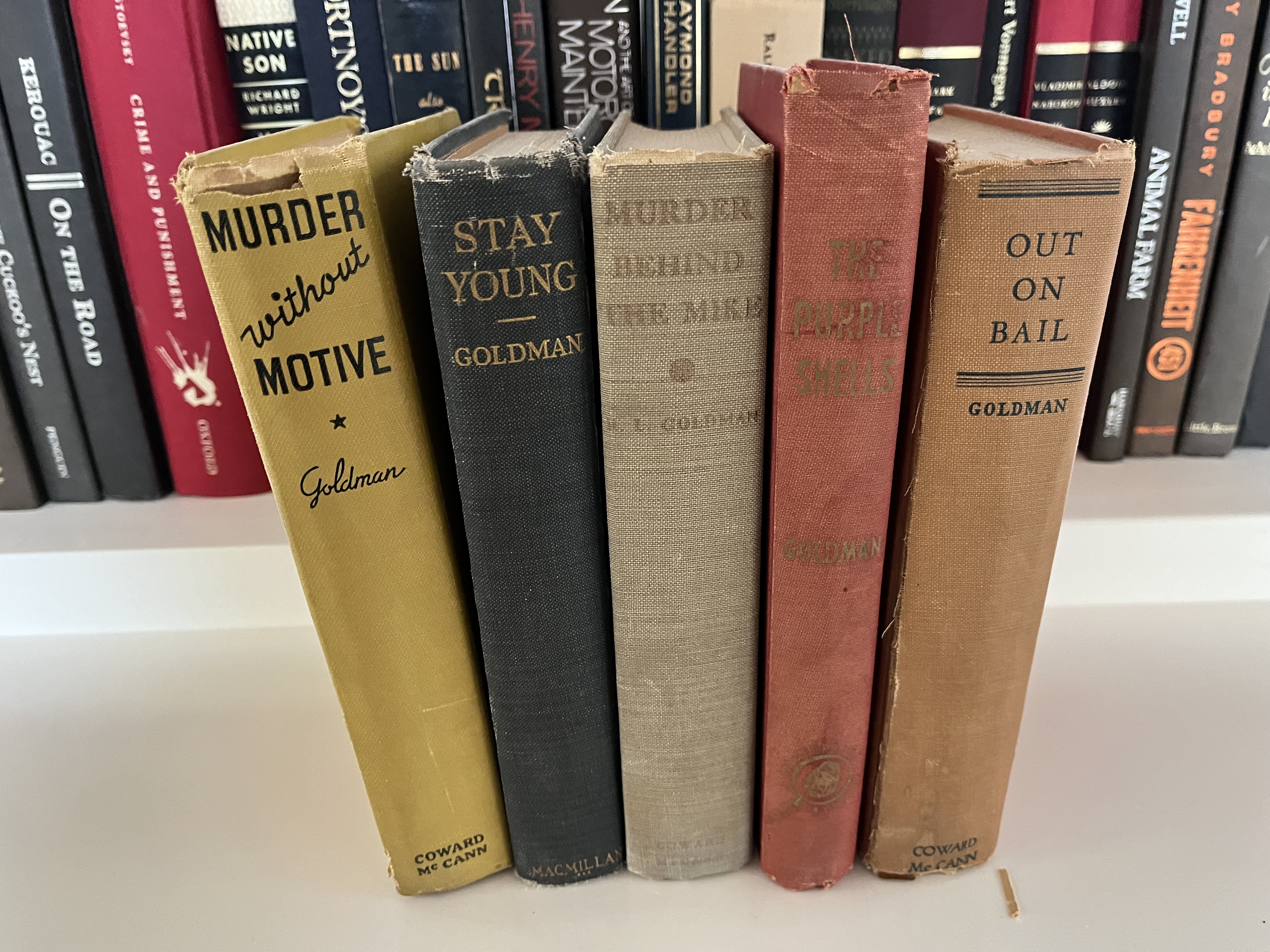
Some of Raymond Leslie Goldman's books

== Early life ==
Goldman had polio as a child, he wrote about in his memoirs The Good Fight (1935) and Victory Over Pain (1947). As a result of the disease, he had atrophied muscles in his legs. He became deaf when he was 19 years old. He also had diabetes and followed a limited diet.

== Career ==
Goldman served in World War I, after which he held several jobs in radio and with pulp magazines.

In 1917, he published his first short story in Collier's Weekly. He later settled in Nashville, Tennessee. He regularly contributed short stories, often humorous, to The Saturday Evening Post and other magazines. In 1922, he wrote Bing Bang Boom!, an atory in the same vein that was adapted into a silent film. Other works of Goldman's adapted into films included Battling Bunyan (1924), from a short story in the Saturday Evening Post, and That Red-Headed Hussy (1929).

In 1929 with The Hartwell Case, Goldman gradually transitioned from short stories to detective fiction, notably a six-title series whose protagonists were newspaper editor Asaph Clume and fiery, red-headed reporter Rufus Reed. Rufus often narrated their investigations, which took place in a fictional small town in the American Midwest.

Goldman died in 1950. His books remain sought after by collectors.

== Personal ==
His nephews Louis L. Goldman and Ben F. Goldman Jr. and great-grandnephew Jeffrey D. Goldman were noted entertainment attorneys.

== Writings ==
=== Asaph Clume and Rufus Reed series ===
- The Murder of Harvey Blake (1931)
- Murder Without Motive (1938)
- Death Plays Solitaire (1939)
- The Snatch (1940)
- Murder Behind the Mike (1942)
- The Purple Shells (1947)

=== Other detective novels ===
- The Hartwell Case (1929)
- Judge Robinson Murdered! (1936)
- Out on Bail (1937)

=== Comic novel ===
- Bing Bang Boom! (1922)

=== Memoirs ===
- The Good Fight (1935)
- Even The Night (1947)

=== Short stories ===
- The Smell of the Sawdust (1917)
- The Fourth Degree (1920)
- The Rainbow Chasers (1921)
- Quince or Prince? (1921)
- The House of the Crying Child (1922)
- The Man Who Forgot to Forget (1923)
- Battling Bunyan Ceases to be Funny (1924)
- Kid Webber Does His Best (1925)
- Malowan (1925)
- Packy Makes the Weight (1926)
- Muggy’s Talisman (1928)
- Hushaby, My Abie (1929)
- The Glory of the Kildones (1929)
- My Old Unlocky Home (1929)
- Yankee Noodles (1929)
- Then I’ll Remember You (1929)
- Grandfather’s Stock (1929)
- Knock ‘em Down, Moe Closky (1929)
- For the Sake of Old Man Stein (1929)
- Silver Weds Among the Goldbergs (1929)
- Dolling, We are Growing Thinner (1930)
- Bread on the Water (1930)

=== Adaptations ===
- 1922: Bing Bang Boom, silent film by Fred J. Butler, based on the novel of the same name, with David Butler and Doris Pawn.
- 1924: Battling Bunyan, silent film by Paul Hurst, based on Saturday Evening Post short story Battling Bunyan Ceases to be Funny, with Wesley Barry, Frank Campeau and Molly Malone.
