= Louis L. Goldman =

American entertainment lawyer (1912–1991)

Louis L. ("Lou") Goldman (1912–1991) was a prominent American entertainment lawyer who practiced from 1938 until his death in 1991.

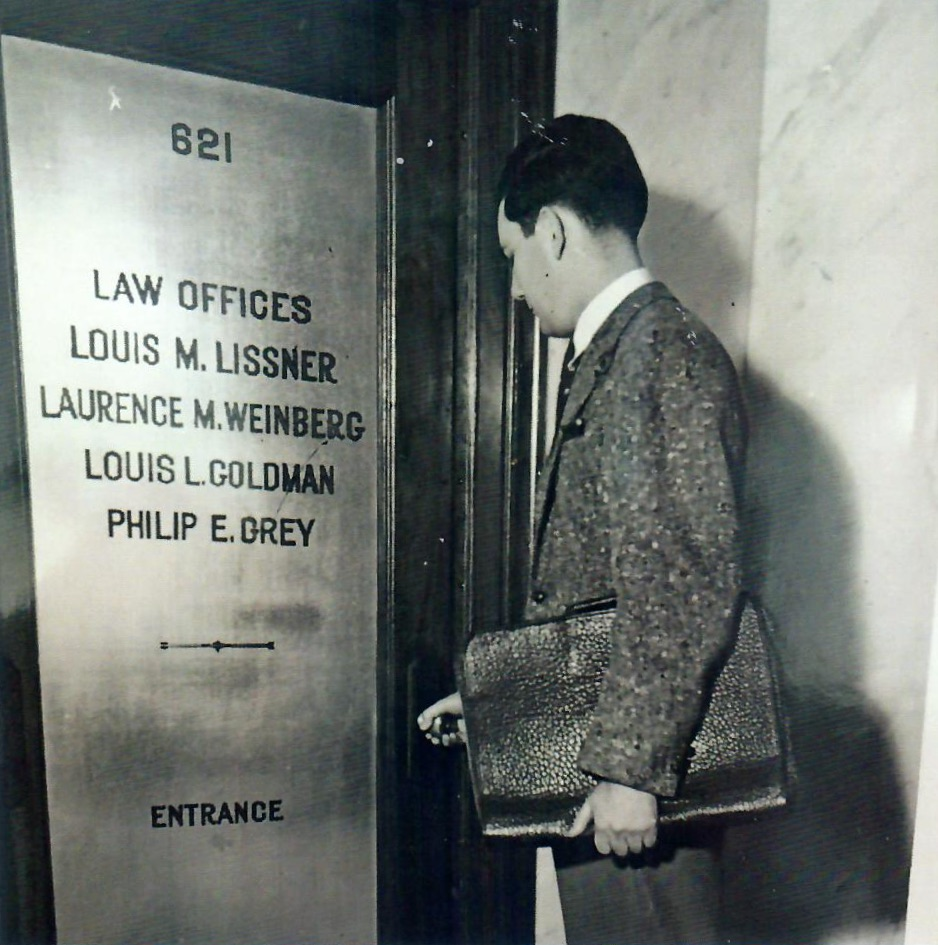
Lou Goldman At His Office Door, 1940s

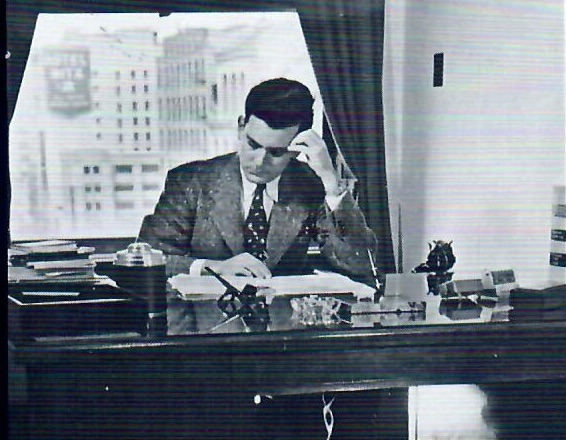
Lou Goldman In His Office, 1940s

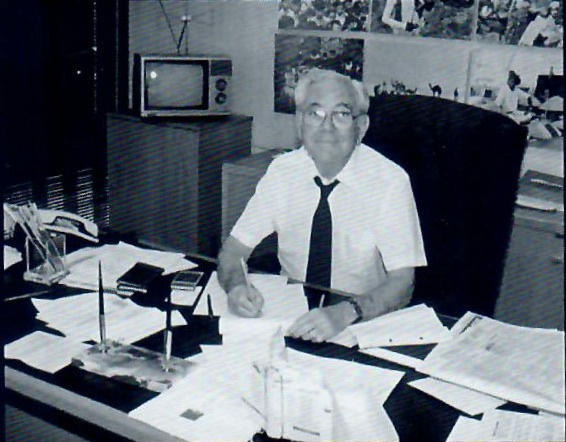
Lou Goldman In His Office, 1980s

== Biography ==
After graduating from USC Law School, where he was a member of the Southern California Law Review, Goldman was admitted to practice law in California in 1938. His early years in practice were rough-and-tumble; as a young lawyer in 1940, he was physically beaten by Oscar-nominated screenwriter Tom Reed when Goldman served court papers on Reed concerning an alimony claim by Reed's ex-wife. Goldman sued Reed, and the court rejected Reed's defense that he thought Goldman was a burglar, awarding Goldman $663 in damages.

In 1939, he received publicity for a suit he brought, as co-counsel with his brother Ben F. Goldman Jr., on behalf of two juvenile roller skaters who claimed that Sid Grauman—the showman who established Hollywood landmarks, the Chinese Theatre and the Egyptian Theatre—had reneged on promises of motion picture roles in exchange for their completion of a 6,000 mile cross-country roller skating junket.

By 1946, he was sufficiently well known that The L.A. Evening Citizen-News printed a letter from a reader proposing Goldman as a write-in candidate for election to the State Board of Equalization, calling him a "prominent Beverly Hills attorney."

In 1951, he represented Mickey Rooney's third wife, actress Martha Vickers, in divorce proceedings.

In 1952, he was named in the famed syndicated Louella Parsons gossip column, based on his hiring by French actress Corinne Calvet for a possible defamation lawsuit against Zsa Zsa Gabor. Gabor had questioned the legitimacy of Calvet's French accent, accusing Calvet of being born in England.

The same year, Goldman represented mystery writer Craig Rice in a bizarre case in which she sued a grocer for false imprisonment following a shoplifting accusation over a bar of soap, only to have the case dismissed when she disappeared for several months and could not be located by Goldman. He later represented Rice in connection with a guardianship action by her mother based on the writer's alleged "chronic alcoholism."

According to actor Robert Blake, Goldman represented "every wildman in the [entertainment] business," including Blake himself, Richard Boone, Lee Marvin, Anthony Quinn, James Coburn, Steve McQueen, and Lee J. Cobb. On The Late Late Show with Tom Snyder, Blake explained:

"[H]e was Cus D'Amato. He took me under his wing. He said, ‘Robert, you have to listen to me. Otherwise you’re never going to make it.' And somehow he had the emotional and the psychological wherewithal to get me to respect and love him. And he kept me out of the courtrooms. Many’s the time he went back in the judge's chambers and drug me back there and solved the problem that was going to turn into a nightmare. [He'd] [c]ome on the set and handle things; once [he went] to Lew Wasserman’s office and said, ‘Don’t worry, I’ll handle it, I’ll fix it'... For some reason or other, I listened to him. When I was with him I was like a little boy. And I would apologize. I’d say ‘God, Lou, I’m sorry.’ He had a way of getting to your heart so that the junkyard dog was not there with him. And he took care of all of us in that way. I was very lucky."

For example, when Richard Boone was involved in a serious car accident after leaving the MGM lot at 3:30 a.m. following a grand party in 1963, Goldman was the one who notified police a few hours later.

In 1962, Goldman represented actress Millie Perkins in divorce proceedings against actor Dean Stockwell.

In 1964, he represented Anthony Quinn in high-profile divorce proceedings from his wife of 27 years, actress Katherine De Mille, the daughter of legendary producer Cecil B. De Mille.

Goldman also represented clients at the forefront of the creation of pay television and cable television in the 1950s and 1960s.

In 1969, he was referenced in a comedy sketch on The Jonathan Winters Show by another of his clients, Barbara Feldon from the TV comedy Get Smart. Feldon pretended to telephone Goldman to represent her in a small-town court before a corrupt judge, played by Winters.

In the 1970s, he and his firm, Goldman & Kagon, represented Lee Marvin in the famous Marvin v. Marvin palimony case brought by Marvin's ex-girlfriend Michelle Triola. Goldman had represented Marvin since the early 1950s. Goldman's contentious testimony at the trial, including his cross-examination by flamboyant attorney Marvin Mitchelson, was widely reported.

By the 1980s, Goldman & Kagon was one of the largest entertainment law firms in Los Angeles, as measured by number of lawyers practicing entertainment law.

== Personal ==
Goldman's uncle was Raymond Leslie Goldman, a prolific author of detective fiction and frequent contributor to The Saturday Evening Post.

His brother Ben F. Goldman Jr., was also a prominent entertainment lawyer, as was his grandson, Jeffrey D. Goldman.
