= Ben F. Goldman Jr. =

Entertainment lawyer (1909-1981)

Ben F. Goldman Jr. (1909–1981) was an entertainment lawyer who practiced from 1937 until he died in 1981. He is not to be confused with Ben M. Goldman, another entertainment lawyer from Los Angeles.

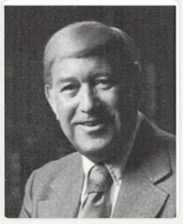
Ben F. Goldman Jr.

== Biography ==
After graduating from USC Law School, where he was a member of the Southern California Law Review, Goldman was admitted to practice law in California in 1937. In 1939, he received publicity for a suit he brought, as co-counsel with his brother Louis L. Goldman, on behalf of two juvenile roller skaters who claimed that Sid Grauman—the showman who established Hollywood landmarks, the Chinese Theatre and the Egyptian Theatre—had reneged on promises of motion picture roles in exchange for their completion of a 6,000-mile cross-country roller skating junket, a popular form of entertainment in the 1930s that, as of 1939, was evolving into the sport of roller derby.

In 1944, Goldman joined the "big five" movie studio RKO Pictures as in-house counsel. He left the studio in 1949 to return to private practice.

In the 1950s, he represented notorious juvenile heiress Mary Catherine Reardon Gueci, daughter of a wealthy St. Louis paint manufacturer, who had "been accused of everything from murder to shoplifting" beginning at the age of 13.

In 1951, he represented MGM set decorator Morris Braun in a stolen idea suit against television station KTTV Channel 11, claiming its show Batter Up was taken from his script, Play Ball.

In 1952 and 1953, representing plaintiffs in a defamation action, he obtained two decisions against prominent publishers before the California Supreme Court, Gill v. Curtis Publishing Co. and Gill v. Hearst Publishing Co., in which California recognized a common-law right of privacy, and the tort of false light, for the first time.

In 1953, he represented writer/producer Mort Greene against actor Bob Cummings in an employment dispute over Greene's services on the television sitcom My Hero.

In 1954, he represented the executive head of Technicolor, Natalie Kalmus, in divorce proceedings, arranging her narrow escape from a jail sentence for contempt of court after she wrote a letter to the judge without Goldman's knowledge.

In 1955, he represented noted radio psychologist John J. Anthony, known as "Mr. Anthony," in a suit against theatrical agent Johnny Maschio, husband of actress Constance Moore, over an agreement to film a television series and distribute radio transcriptions.

Diverging from his Hollywood focus, he represented a coalition of homeowners who unsuccessfully opposed the extension of the Olympic Freeway (now the Santa Monica Freeway) to the Pacific coast in 1956.

In 1958, he represented a film studio schoolteacher in a stolen-idea case over the TV show Sea Hunt.

In 1962, he represented Serge Guy Delprat, a French playwright and poet, in a bizarre case in which he and a woman named Maris Denver Lindley sued one another for false imprisonment over a "ghost story" enactment that took place at Lindley's beach house on Halloween, after the two had met through a mutual friend, Aldous Huxley. Lindley accused Delprat of "bursting into her home, seizing her and threatening her with death." He allegedly screamed, "Trick or treat! These are for the dead!" When she ran into her yard, he allegedly chased her, threw her down and choked her, stopping only when neighbors began screaming. Delprat was imprisoned for a month before Ventura County authorities dropped the charges and released him.

In 1965, he represented actor Michael Wilding, a former husband of Elizabeth Taylor, in a libel suit against gossip columnist Hedda Hopper and the publishers of her book The Whole Truth and Nothing But, securing a six-figure settlement.

In 1980, he represented 13 writers from The Red Skelton Show in a suit against Skelton demanding that he syndicate his show in reruns so that the writers could receive residuals.

== Personal ==
Also active in politics, Goldman was elected president of the 26th Congressional District Democratic Council in 1963.

His brother, Louis L. Goldman, and grand-nephew, Jeffrey D. Goldman, were also prominent entertainment lawyers.
