= Digital download class-action settlements =

The digital download class-action settlements were a series of legal settlements by the world's three major record companies, between 2012 and 2015, which The Hollywood Reporter called an "important chapter in the legal history of the music business."

== Overview ==
The class actions emerged in the aftermath of F.B.T. Productions, LLC v. Aftermath Records, a lawsuit that created debate within the music industry about whether digital downloads constituted "sales" of records or "licenses" of master recordings within the meaning of most recording contracts, and how that distinction would affect the royalties paid by record companies to artists. Artists and record companies differed on how the F.B.T. ruling would apply, if at all, to other recording contracts.

Comparison of the three settlements is difficult, not only because of the ambiguity of the published reports about Sony's settlement discussed below, but because of the differing market shares of the companies, the differences between "claims made" and "common fund" class action settlements, and the unknown number of artists who opted out of the class settlements and the size of their claims. What is clear, however, is that none of the settlements adopted the premise of the F.B.T. case that download sales should universally be treated contractually as "masters licensed" rather than "records sold."

=== Sony settlement ===
Of the four major record companies in existence in 2012, Sony Music was the first to settle. Publicly disclosed terms of the settlement included a fund of $7.95 million to pay past claims and a 3 percent increase in artists’ royalty rates with respect to digital income. However, published reports differed on how this 3% "bump" was to be calculated. Some characterized this as a 3% increase of the base royalty rate itself (e.g., an artist that previously received a 7% royalty on records sold would now receive a 10% royalty on downloads sold, which would translate into an effective 42.8% increase in payments). Others characterized the 3% as being a percentage of Sony's gross download receipts -- meaning a royalty rate of 7% would increase to just 7.21% (7% X 1.03), and an artist would receive just 3 percent more of the 70 cents Sony received for 99 cent downloads.

=== Warner settlement ===
The next to settle was Warner Music Group. Warner agreed to pay $11.5 million in past royalties and, for future royalties, a 5% increase in the base royalty rate, with a minimum 10% royalty and a maximum 14% royalty.

=== Universal and EMI/Capitol settlement ===
The last to settle was Universal Music Group, a settlement that required review of over 11,000 recording contracts, encompassed claims originally made separately against the fourth major record company, EMI/Capitol Records, which Universal had acquired during the pendency of the class actions, and potentially applied to over 7,500 artists. Universal agreed to pay $11.5 million, like Warner, and increase digital download royalties by 10%. This 10% was apparently to be applied to download receipts, meaning the royalty rate on downloads would effectively be raised by 10% of the royalty rate itself-- that is, a 7% royalty rate would become 7.7%, not 17%.
