= Battling Bunyan =

1924 film

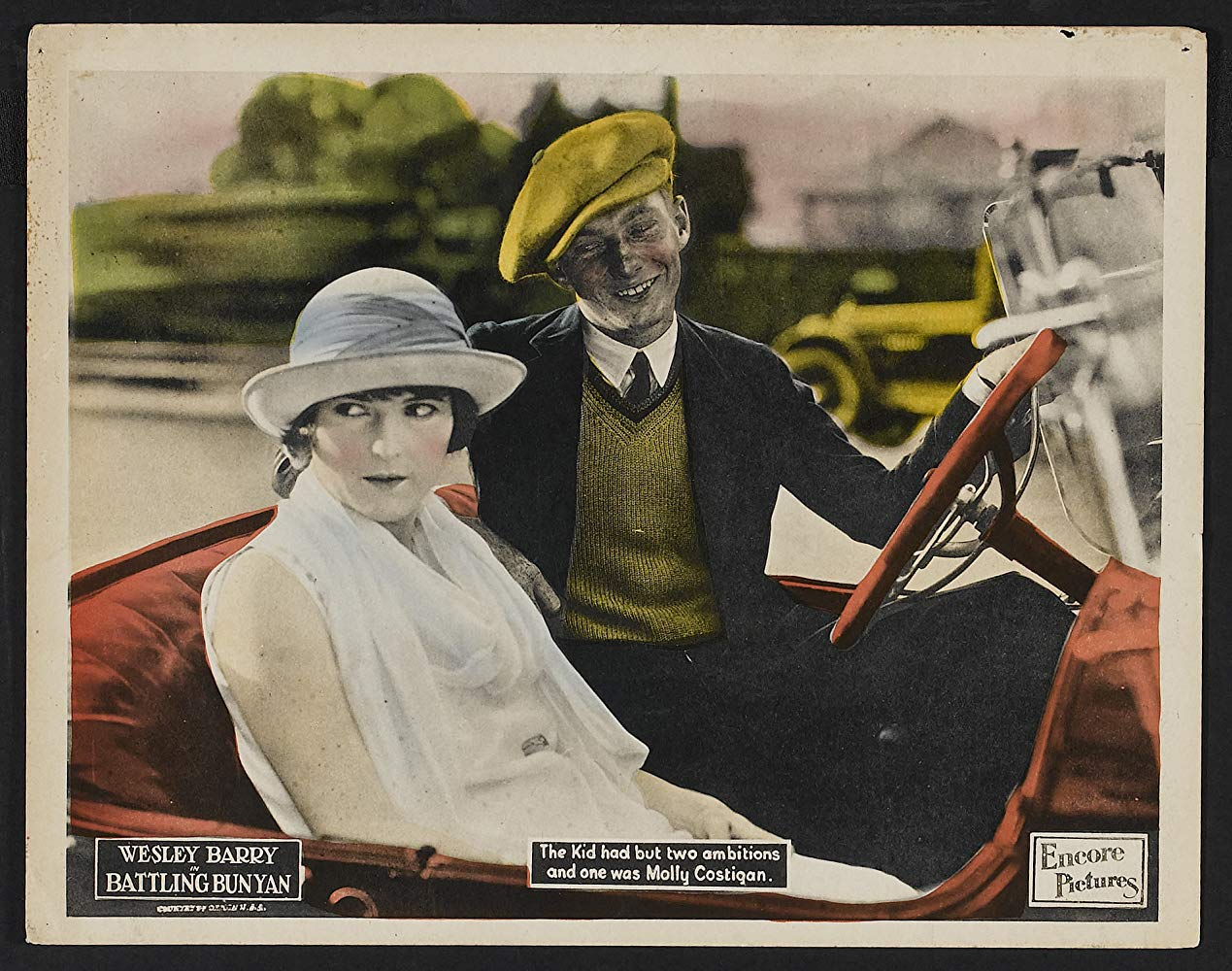
- Lobby card with Malone and Barry
- Directed by: Paul Hurst
- Written by: Jefferson Moffitt; Ford Beebe
- Starring: Wesley Barry; Frank Campeau; Molly Malone
- Cinematography: Frank Cotner
- Edited by: Fred Burnworth
- Production company: Encore Pictures
- Distributed by: Pathé Exchange
- Release date: December 28, 1924
- Running time: 53 minutes
- Country: United States
- Language: Silent (English intertitles)

Battling Bunyan is a 1924 American silent sports comedy film directed by Paul Hurst and starring Wesley Barry, Frank Campeau, and Molly Malone. It was based on a short story in the Saturday Evening Post by Raymond Leslie Goldman. In order to raise cash in a hurry, a young man takes up professional boxing despite the fact he is totally unsuited to it.

== Plot ==
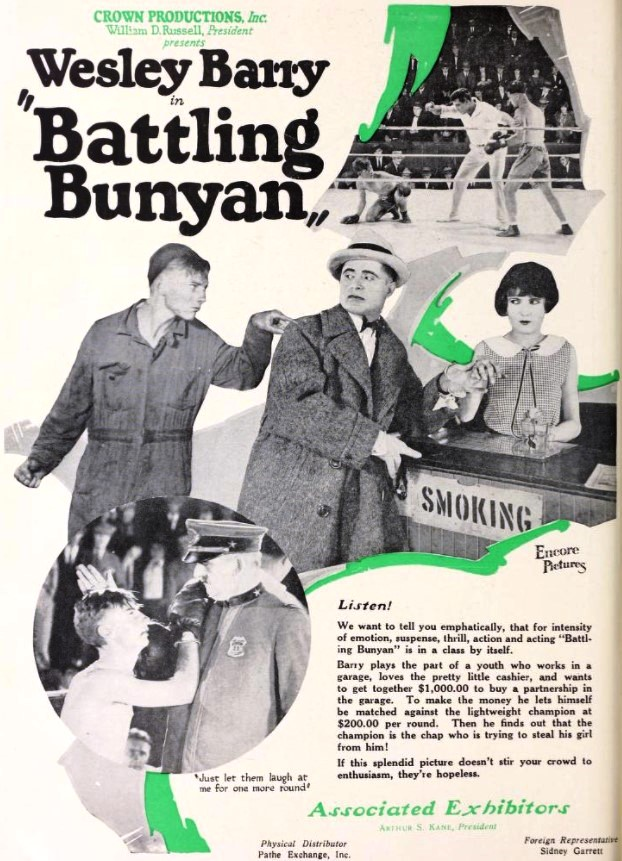
Ad from January 3, 1925 The Moving Picture World

As described in a review in a film magazine, Bunyan (Barry), a young chap who has gained a lot of experience in the school of hard knocks, has a small position in a garage. The light-weight champion fighter (Ralesco) comes in and flirts with Bunyan’s girl Molly (Malone) and Bunyan tries to fight him. Jim Canby (Campeau), the local fight promoter, gets the idea of signing Bunyan up for fights to give his patrons a laugh, billing him as Red Aiken Bunyan, and it works. Bunyan knows he is a clown but the money helps to buy a partnership in the garage. Finally, the champion returns and again starts after Molly. The prize fight is to be a frame-up and Bunyan agrees at $200 a round. He takes a terrific beating and tries to stay out five rounds but only lasts four. Mollie, thoroughly won over by his gameness, tries to see Bunyan, but the champion intercepts her and tries to attack her when she repulses him. Bunyan jumps on him and finally beats him. Canby gives Bunyan the full thousand dollars prize and he buys into the garage partnership and then marries Molly.

== Cast ==
- Wesley Barry as Battling Bunyan
- Frank Campeau as Jim Canby
- Molly Malone as Molly Costigan
- Landers Stevens as Pierson
- Al Kaufman as Referee
- John Ralesco as Johnny Prentiss
- Jackie Fields as Sailor Levinsky
- Chester Conklin as A Stranger
- Pat Kemp as Rudy
- Harry Mann as Prizefighter Manager

== Reception ==
While Battling Bunyan was acceptable in the United States, the British Board of Film Censors banned the film when it was submitted for review in 1926.

== Preservation ==
Battling Bunyan has been released on dvd.

== Bibliography ==
- Tim Lussier. "Bare Knees" Flapper: The Life and Films of Virginia Lee Corbin. McFarland, 2018.
