= Benjamin Goldman =

Advisor and Author

Benjamin A. Goldman (born October 21, 1960) was an advisor of the Clinton Administration serving as a charter member of the National Environmental Justice Advisory Council (1994-1995) and a committee member of the President's Council on Sustainable Development (1994-1995). He is one of the authors for the U.S. Environmental Protection Agency and the U.S. Department of Commerce. His work in technology and sustainability helped establish Presidential Executive Order No. 12898 in 1994, a Supreme Court victory (Federal Election Commission v. Political Contributions Data Inc., 943 F.2d 190, 2d Cir. 1991), as well as a national grass-roots effort called “environmental justice".

== Early life and education ==
Goldman was born to Allen Seymour and Mary (Lemann) Goldman on October 21, 1960, in Philadelphia, Pennsylvania. He earned a bachelor's degree in history from Vassar College in 1982, then a Master of Philosophy from New York University in 1990, and a Doctorate of Philosophy in Public Administration from New York University in 1993.

== Career ==
Before and after completing his doctorate, he served governments and nonprofit organizations at local, state, national, and international levels. His career began as a military economics researcher at the Council on Economic Priorities, where he was a Project Director in the early 1980s. He worked as co-founder and president of Public Data Access, Inc. and associate director of the Boston-based Jobs and Environment Campaign. He was also executive director of the Citizens Network for Sustainable Development, which coordinated the participation of U.S. NGOs at the 1992 Earth Summit in Rio de Janeiro, Brazil. He most recently founded and directed Nature Breakthroughs LLC in 2016.

=== Art ===
Goldman was executive director of the art gallery City Without Walls (cWOW), established in 1975, which supported emerging artists from New Jersey and beyond. Some well-known artists participated in cWOW, including Ibou Ndoye, Courtney Burke, and Mansa Mussa.

Goldman founded United Visual Arts, Inc. in 2005. During this, he invented an art display frame and got patent number US 8,365,452 B2 for his invention that was sold by the Museum of Modern Art. International museums Allied Museum and Topkapi Palace have displayed his paintings.

=== Politics ===
Goldman's mother was involved in politics in Philadelphia when he was a child and ran for City Council. Goldman ran for Mayor in Weehawken in 2002, and helped several citizen organizations that advocated for sustainable planning along the Hudson River, including Friends of the Weehawken Waterfront and co-founded Weehawken Initiative Now (WIN), and the Weehawken Chamber of Commerce.

== Selected publications ==
Goldman has written several books and research articles focusing mainly on the environment, sustainable development, art, and personal development. According to Google Scholar, his publication and co-authored works have been cited over 1,500 times by researchers.

The following is a list of selected publications by him.

- The Truth About Where You Live: An Atlas for Action on Toxins and Mortality (Times Books)
- Discounting Human Lives: Uranium and Global Equity (Avebury)
- Nature Breakthroughs: 5 Steps to Transform Yourself and the World (United Visual Arts)
- On Every Wall: Reproduction and the Future of Art (United Visual Arts)
- Toxic Wastes and Race in the United States (United Church of Christ Commission for Racial Justice and Public Data Access, Inc.)
- "What is the future of Environmental Justice?" Antipode
- Toxic Wastes and Race Revisited (Center for Policy Alternatives, NAACP, UCCCRJ)
- Not Just Prosperity: Achieving Sustainability with Environmental Justice (National Wildlife Foundation)
- Sustainable America: New Public Policy for the 21st Century (U.S. Economic Development Administration)
- The U.S. Military's Toxic Legacy (National Toxics Campaign)
- "Community right to know: Environmental information for citizen participation," Environmental Impact Assessment Review
- "The environment and community right to know: Information for participation" (Psychology Press)
- "Rating the performance of waste management companies," Environment
- "Polluting the Poor," The Nation
- "The use of risk assessment during selection of off-site response actions," Hazardous Wastes and Hazardous Materials
- The importance of access to information on hazardous waste (Council on Economic Priorities)
- "RCRA must be strengthened," The New York Times.
- "Equity and the 1992 Rio Earth Summit," Fordham Law Journal
- Hazardous Waste Management: Reducing the Risk (Island Press)

== Awards and recognitions ==
Goldman won $10,000 of a cash prize for “City Without Walls” given by Prudential Financial, Inc.
