= Ben M. Goldman =

Ben M. Goldman (1883–1952) was a Los Angeles attorney. He was lead counsel for the defense in the famous Charlie Chaplin right of publicity case, Chaplin v. Amador, in which Chaplin sought relief against an imitator calling himself "Charlie Aplin." Goldman aggressively cross-examined Chaplin, drawing frequent objections from Chaplin's attorneys Making the point that even copyrights and patents only confer temporary legal protection, not protection in perpetuity, Goldman argued: "Even the inventions of the nation's geniuses are given protection with the understanding that at the expiration of a limited number of years their discoveries will become public property to be used for the benefit of all." After the decision largely favoring Chaplin, Goldman vowed that his client would give up the name "Charlie Aplin," but would otherwise continue producing films as before, without changing his look.

He also represented controversial evangelist Aimee Semple McPherson, one of the most famous celebrities in the United States in the 1920s.

In 1932 he won a judgment of $2,137,500 for a New York real estate broker against the Rio Grande Oil Company for stock manipulation, which was then one of the largest legal judgments ever recorded in the United States.

In other matters that were covered by the press, in 1931 he sued actress Florence Eldridge, the wife of actor Fredric March, in a personal injury case arising from an auto accident; and in 1934 he won a $15,000 judgment for alienation of affections in a case against wealthy aviation magnate and Olympics yachtsman Frederick Conant.
