= F.B.T. Productions, LLC v. Aftermath Records =

- Court: United States Court of Appeals for the Ninth Circuit
- Full case name: F.B.T. Productions, LLC; EM2M, LLC v. Aftermath Records, DBA Aftermath Entertainment; Interscope Records; UMG Recordings, Inc.; ARY, Inc.
- Decided: September 3, 2010
- Citation: 621 F.3d 958; No. CV 07-3314 PSG (MANx).

Case history
- Prior actions: Appeal from the United States District Court for the Central District of California. D.C. No. 2:07-cv-03314-PSG-MAN, D.C. No. 2:07-cv-03314-PSG-MAN. Philip S. Gutierrez, District Judge, Presiding. F.B.T. Prods., LLC v. Aftermath Records, 2009 U.S. Dist. LEXIS 5981 (C.D. Cal., Jan. 20, 2009)
- Subsequent actions: US Supreme Court certiorari denied by Aftermath Records v. F.B.T. Prod., 2011 U.S. LEXIS 2255 (U.S., Mar. 21, 2011)

Court membership
- Judges sitting: Joseph Jerome Farris, Cynthia Holcomb Hall, Barry G. Silverman

F.B.T. Productions, LLC, et al. v. Aftermath Records, et al. 621 F.3d 958 was a case in which the United States Court of Appeals for the Ninth Circuit dealt with how Federal Copyright Law applied to the sales and licensing contracts of music downloads and other downloadable copyrighted material. Specifically, the circuit court ruled that a licensing provision in the contract between F.B.T. Productions and Aftermath Records unambiguously applied to permanent downloads and mastertones offered through third party distributors. After reviewing the First Sale Doctrine and the nature of Aftermath's contracts with its distributors, the circuit court concluded that such downloads constituted a licensing of copyrights rather than a sale, causing Aftermath to pay higher royalties to F.B.T. under their agreement.

== Overview ==
In 1995 Plaintiff F.B.T. Productions, LLC ("FBT") signed fellow Plaintiff, rap artist Marshall Bruce Mathers III (stage name Eminem), to a recording contract. Subsequent contract agreements in 1998 and 2000 between Plaintiffs and Defendant Aftermath Records ("Aftermath"), a subsidiary of Interscope Records, UMG Recordings, Inc., and ARY, Inc., allowed Aftermath the right to distribute recordings of Eminem, and then ultimately transferred all exclusive rights of Eminem's recordings to Aftermath. In exchange for these rights, the agreements provided that Aftermath pay FBT royalties between 12% - 20% of the retail price of copies of Eminem's records sold ("Records Sold" provision). Furthermore, the agreements provided that FBT receive 50% of the net revenue Aftermath obtained by licensing out the use of Eminem's master recordings ("Masters Licensed" provision).

Beginning in 2001, Defendants licensed various third parties the right to distribute over the Internet, recordings of Eminem in the form of music downloads and ringtones. These parties included, but were not limited to, the iTunes music store, Sprint, Nextel, Cingular, and T-Mobile.

In 2005 auditors hired by Plaintiffs allegedly found that Defendants were remitting to Plaintiffs royalties for music downloads and ringtones under the lower percentage "Records Sold" provision of their agreement. Based on these findings, Plaintiffs filed complaints in 2007 and 2008, alleging breach of contract and motioned for summary judgment. Plaintiffs claimed that language in the record contracts stipulated that music downloads and ringtones be classified not as "Records Sold", but instead as the higher percentage "Masters Licensed", and that these higher royalties be remitted to FBT as such.

== District Court Ruling and Jury Trial ==
United States District Judge Philip S. Gutierrez denied Plaintiffs' motion for summary judgment on the grounds that the contract agreements were too ambiguous as to how to calculate royalties for downloads and ringtones. Based on the third party agreements, the court could not definitively conclude if downloads were licenses. Also, neither party was able to establish any prevailing industry custom as to how downloads and ringtones were traditionally calculated. In lieu of conclusive information, the court took into consideration that the agreements gave the Defendants the right to sell recordings, "...in any [or] all forms of media now known and hereinafter developed..." and that Plaintiffs never objected to the lower royalty rate until after the audit, therefore providing insight as to Plaintiffs' original intent. As such, the court ruled that both parties' reasonable expectations for download and ringtone royalties at the time of the agreement was that of a sale.

Accordingly, the issue went to trial where a jury, "...returned a verdict in favor of Aftermath, and the district court awarded Aftermath its attorneys’ fees of over $2.4 million."

== US Court of Appeals for the Ninth Circuit ==
Upon appeal by Plaintiffs to the US Court of Appeals for the Ninth Circuit Decision, "[t]he judgment in favor of defendants was reversed, the district court's order granting attorneys' fees to defendants was vacated, and the case was remanded for further proceedings."

In its reversal, the circuit court emphasized its right to review the district court's denial of Plaintiffs' motion for summary judgment, as the district court's "determination of whether an ambiguity exists remains 'a question of law, subject to independent review on appeal.'" Thus it started by reiterating the district court's conclusion that since either the "Records Sold" or the "Masters Licensed" provision could apply to the downloads, that neither the Plaintiffs' nor the Defendant's motions for summary judgment could be granted due to an inherent ambiguity. However, the circuit court pointed out the specific use of the word "notwithstanding," explaining that the provision states "notwithstanding" the "Records Sold" provision, the "Masters Licensed" provision would apply. The circuit court interpreted this to mean that the "Masters Licensed" provision had overarching scope, concluding that no ambiguity existed.

A contractual term is not ambiguous just because it is broad. Here, the Masters Licensed provision explicitly applies to (1) masters (2) that are licensed to third parties for the manufacture of records “or for any other uses,” (3) “notwithstanding” the Record Sold provision. This provision is admittedly broad, but it is not unclear or ambiguous.

The court then discussed whether or not Aftermath licensed the music to third party distributors, making extensive use of the Copyright Act of 1976, including references to sections 17 U.S.C. § 114, 17 U.S.C. § 115, and the First-sale doctrine as expressed in 17 U.S.C. § 109. The court reaffirmed the fundamental differences between a sale and a license, particularly pointing out that "a 'sale' of a work may either be a transfer in title of an individual copy of a work, or a sale of all exclusive intellectual property rights in a work." Relying heavily on the Supreme Court's interpretation of these statutes, the court of appeals thus ruled that Defendants' dealings with third parties were license agreements and not sales. This was mainly based on the fact that Defendants' transfer of copyrighted material to third parties did not include ownership title of copyrighted material, and that Defendants reserved the right to reclaim copyrighted material at any time, therefore no sale was made.

Furthermore, the court established that the copyrighted material transferred to the third parties qualified as a master recording due to the quality and fidelity of the recordings. Aftermath had also argued that F.B.T. failed to complain about the lower royalty rates until the audit in 2006, claiming this demonstrated acquiescence on the part of the Plaintiff. The court ruled against this as well, determining that such actions by the Plaintiff were reasonable and contributed nothing to their intentions, stating, "F.B.T. had no obligation to audit the statements any earlier than it did, and it immediately raised the issue with Aftermath after the audit." The court therefore concluded that the Defendants owed Plaintiffs a royalty rate of 50% for downloads and ringtones under the "Masters Licensed" provision.

== Supreme Court of the United States ==
The Defendants petitioned the Supreme Court of the United States, seeking a review of the Ninth Circuit's judgment. In March 2011 the US Supreme Court denied the Defendants' petition for writ of certiorari.
