= Charlie Chaplin right of publicity case =

1923 lawsuit by Charlie Chaplin against an imitator

Chaplin v. Amador, a lawsuit brought by actor Charlie Chaplin against an imitator named "Charlie Aplin," set an important legal precedent that a performer's persona and style, in this case Chaplin's "particular kind or type of mustache, old and threadbare hat, clothes and shoes, a decrepit derby, ill-fitting vest, tight-fitting coat, and trousers and shoes much too large for him, and with this attire, a flexible cane usually carried, swung and bent as he performs his part," is entitled to legal protection from those unfairly mimicking those traits in order to deceive the public. The case was an important milestone in U.S. courts' ultimate recognition of a common-law right of publicity.

== Trial ==
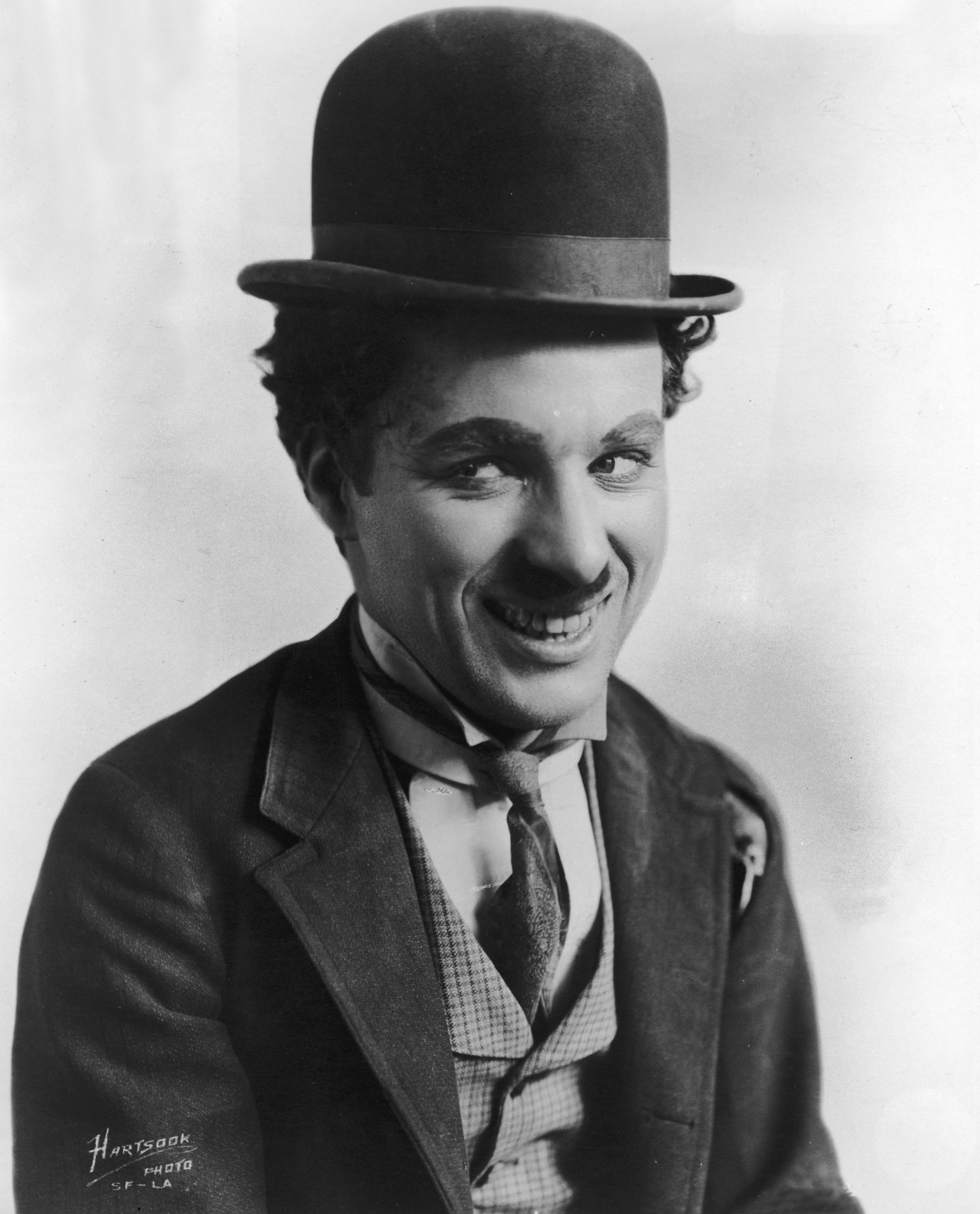
Charlie Chaplin as "the Tramp"

Chaplin sued Charles Amador in 1923, claiming that Amador had been "stealing his stuff" by performing in films an imitation of Chaplin under the name "Charlie Aplin." The case attracted widespread publicity, with front-page newspaper coverage. When Chaplin testified, "admiring movie fans thronged the court room to get a glimpse of him in the witness box." Chaplin's cross-examination was heated and contentious.

Chaplin's counsel, Lloyd Wright, argued that Chaplin "is the only performer who has used this particular 'tramp' makeup consistently since 1913. The baggy pants, small mustache and small derby have become unalterably associated in the public mind with Charlie Chaplin." "Charlie Chaplin is protected from imitators who dress their products to resemble his, just as much as are makers of automobile headlights or any other product which enjoys popularity." As evidence, he argued, "Chaplin receives mail without any address carrying only a sketch of the character he portrays in the films." He presented evidence from prominent writer Rob Wagner that the Amador films would confuse Chaplin fans, and Monta Bell, a director whose mentor was Chaplin, who testified that he had been misled by lobby displays of figures resembling Chaplin. He also argued that the defendants' consultation with attorneys before making their "imitation" motion pictures showed that they had acted with fraudulent intent.

Amador's attorney Ben Goldman presented evidence that Chaplin's "duck shuffle walk" had been portrayed on the British stage around 1907 by music hall player Fred Kitchen, predating Chaplin's portrayal. Goldman argued that Chaplin's so-called persona was merely "tricks of makeup" that had been used by scores of comedians before him. The trick derby, cane, and even the "picturesque brogans," he argued, were worn by slapstick artists before Chaplin's time. He added, "I have found Chaplin's antics funny, but I never got a spiritual kick out of them. Chaplin is demanding a monopoly of a role which has been common property of countless comedians." Goldman posited, "Is this so-called king of clowns to be granted special privileges greater than those given to an Edison, Steinmetz, or any other pioneer in fields of progress?" Making the point that even copyrights and patents only confer temporary legal protection, not protection in perpetuity, Goldman argued: "Even the inventions of the nation's geniuses are given protection with the understanding that at the expiration of a limited number of years their discoveries will become public property to be used for the benefit of all." He also tried to introduce evidence that Chaplin had previously lost a similar lawsuit in Germany.

== Ruling ==
Three months later, the court entered its ruling: an "injunction forbidding the use of the name Charlie Aplin by the defendant or other imitation by him or associated defendants whereby the public would be likely to be deceived into believing films or screens acted and offered by the defendants were those of the plaintiff, leaving it to be determined by themselves what constitutes such imitation, advertising and deception, and to the court, thereafter, on contempt proceedings, to determine whether acts, charged and committed, constituted violation of the terms of the injunction." Both sides claimed victory. After the decision, Amador's lawyer declared that his client would give up the name Charlie Aplan, but would otherwise continue producing films as before, without changing his makeup.

== Appeal ==
On appeal, the court affirmed the trial court, holding that the plaintiff had a right to seek "to prevent [a defendant] from imitating the plaintiff in such a way as to deceive the public and work a fraud upon the public and plaintiff." The court cited as evidence of an intent to deceive that the defendant had sent letters to movie distributors reading, "We announce the production of twelve two-reel record breaking comedies featuring `Charlie Aplin' in the well known character, famous the world over"; "Our comedian is a world beater in this famous character. There never was a better drawing card. A Charlie Aplin contract will soon be a big value in your territory, so wire us at once"; and "Aplin, whose name is like that of Charlie Chaplin, who looks like him and acts like him, and who is a regular fellow with it all, came down here for the Sanford Productions." By focusing on the ample evidence of fraudulent intent, rather than the objective legal principle, the court was able to affirm Chaplin's rights in his persona without addressing whether the result would be the same in a setting involving less deliberate deception.
