= Theater law =

2012 Japanese legislation

The Act on the Vitalization of Theaters and Halls (劇場、音楽堂等の活性化に関する法律, Gekijō, Ongakudō tō no Kasseika ni kan suru Hōritsu), also known as the Theater Law (劇場法, Gekijōhō), is a Japanese law passed in 2012 to promote theaters and other performance venues.

== Introduction ==
The Bunka Geijutsu Shinkō Kihonhō (The Fundamental Law for the Promotion of Culture and Arts) was an act established to revitalize theaters, music halls, cultural halls, and other venues where cultural performances take place. The law provided stipulations for individuals, groups, organizations, and governmental agencies that founded or managed theaters, and provided a legal framework for the cooperation of these entities. It also aimed to revitalize local communities.

== History ==
In January 2012, the draft of the law was formulated by the Agency for Cultural Affairs. The impetus behind the law was the enactment of the Bunka Geijutsu Shinkō Kihonhō (The Fundamental Law for the Promotion of Culture and Arts) in 2001. After its enactment, people involved in culture and the arts (including members of the Nippon Geinō Jitsuenka Dantai Kyōgikai) began considering additional measures to support theaters. A government meeting occurred in 2010 to examine the idea, but further meetings were suspended for more than three months due to the Great East Japan earthquake on March 11, 2011. Additionally, the National Diet's budget for culture and art was reduced, and some objections had to be addressed. Eventually, a draft of the law was written.

The proposed law was presented to the National Diet in 2012, and went into effect in July 2012. In 2013, the Agency for Cultural Affairs began to collect ideas on ways to revitalize the theaters and arts, improve the quality of drama, and engage local communities.

== Reception ==
Sentiments regarding the Theater Law were divided. Sawako Siga, director of a theatrical company, expressed concern that the Theater Law would have negative effects on culture; that Japanese people would pay less attention to plays, and that many private theaters would lose their individual identities by merging with large public theaters that received the bulk of subsidies.

== Memorable episodes ==
The Agency for Cultural Affairs started the project in the 25th year of Heisei. It contained four projects:

- Tokubetu Siennzigyo, the project of special support.
- Kyodo Seisaku Siennzigyo, the project of supporting joint production.
- Katudobetu Siennzigyo, the project of support classified by activity.
- Gekizyo-Onngakudoto kann Network Kotiku Siennzigyo, the project of supporting network between theaters and music halls construction.

Each project gave financial support to suitable organizations. On May 17, 2013, the agency announced the result: the total number of applications was 133, and 108 organizations were adopted. The budget was 2,602 million. The same project was carried out in the 26th year of Heisei: on April 1, 2014, the agency announced that the total number of applications was 205, 165 organizations were adopted, and the budget was 2,869 million.

The organizations supported by these projects and the other organizations have tried to observe the Theater Law, so they have held many symposia. For example, the Nippon Geinō Jitsuenka Dantai Kyōgikai adopted a declaration on best practices for theaters, music halls, and art organizations, as well as enriching arts and local culture at the second forum, on January 20, 2014, and held a third forum on June 30, 2014, and on July 1, 2014.
