= Music law =

Legal aspects of the music industry

Music law refers to legal aspects of the music industry, and certain legal aspects in other sectors of the entertainment industry. The music industry includes record labels, music publishers, merchandisers, the live events sector and of course performers and artists.

The terms "music law" and "entertainment law", along with "business affairs", are used by the music and entertainment industry and should not be thought of as academic definitions. Indeed, music law covers a range of traditional legal subjects including intellectual property law (copyright law, trademarks, image publicity rights, design rights), competition law, bankruptcy law, contract law, defamation and, for the live events industry, immigration law, health and safety law, and licensing. While foundational norms have gradually been established for music law in western nations, other parts of the world maintain unique traditions that impact music's legal status in the context of both heritage preservation and enormous national arts entertainment industries, including China and India.

== Definitions ==
- A "compilation" refers to work formed from already existing materials in a way that forms its own original work, including collective works.
- "Copies" are physical objects that hold, fix, or embody a work such as a music tape, film, CD, statue, play, or printed sheet music.
- "Sound recordings" can refer to any audio recording including the sound accompanying motion pictures.
- "Copyright owner" is the entity that legally owns rights to a work.
- "Performance" The copyright holder has the exclusive right to perform the work in public, or to license others to perform it. The right applies to "literary, musical, dramatic, and choreographic works, pantomimes, and motion pictures and other audiovisual works.". Playing a CD in public, or showing a film in public is "performing" the work.

== Publishing ==
Publishing is the primary source of income for musicians writing their own music. Money collected from the 'publishing' rights is ultimately destined for songwriters - the composers of works, whether or not they are the recording artist or performer. Often, songwriters will work for a musical ensemble to help them with musical aspects of the composition, but here again, the writer of the song is the owner of it and will own the copyrights in the song and thus will be entitled to the publishing revenues. Copyrights in compositions are not the same as sound recordings. A recording artist can record a song and sell it to another band or company. As a result, that particular company will own the recording, but not the song. The original writer will always maintain the copyright for that particular song. The publishing money is connected to the copyright, so the owner will be the only one making money off of the song itself. All successful songwriters will join a collection society (such as ASCAP and BMI in the USA, SOCAN in Canada, JASRAC in Japan, GEMA in Germany and PRS for Music in the UK, etc.) and many will enter into agreements with music publishing companies who will exploit their works on the songwriters behalf for a share of ownership, although many of these deals involve the transfer (assignment) of copyright from the songwriter to the music publisher,

Both the recorded music sector and music publishing sector have their foundations in intellectual property law and all of the major recording labels and major music publishers and many independent record labels and publishers have dedicated "business and legal affairs" departments with in-house lawyers whose role is not only to secure intellectual property rights from recording artists, performers and songwriters but also to exploit those rights and protect those rights on a global basis. There are a number of specialist independent law firms around the world who advise on music and entertainment law whose clients include recording artists, performers, producers, songwriters, labels, music publishers, stage and set designers, choreographers, graphic artists, games designers, merchandisers, broadcasters, artist managers, distributors, collection societies and the live events sector (which further includes festivals, venues, promoters, booking agents and production service providers such as lighting and staging companies).

== Business ==
The US government views artists that give concerts and sell merchandise as a business. Bands that tour internationally will also face a plethora of legislation around the world including health and safety laws, immigration laws and tax legislation. Also, many relationships are governed by often complex contractual agreements.

In the US, it is important for musicians to get legal business licenses. These can be obtained at a city hall or local government center. The business license will require the tracking of sales, wages, and gigs. A tax ID is also necessary for all businesses. Musicians that fail to comply with the tax ID process and do not report their profits and losses to the government can face serious consequences with the IRS.
