= Entertainment law =

Legal services provided to the entertainment industry

Entertainment law, also known as media law, encompasses legal services provided to the entertainment industry. These services often overlap with intellectual property law, which includes key components such as trademarks, copyright, and the right of publicity. However, the practice of entertainment law frequently extends into other legal areas including employment law, contract law, torts, labor law, bankruptcy law, immigration, securities law, security interests, agency, right of privacy, defamation, advertising, criminal law, tax law, International law (especially private international law), and insurance law.

Much of the work of an entertainment law practice is transaction based, i.e., drafting contracts, negotiation, and mediation. Some situations may lead to litigation or arbitration.

== Overview ==
Entertainment law covers an area of law that involves media of all different types (e.g. TV, film, music, publishing, advertising, Internet & news media, etc.) and stretches over various legal fields, which include corporate, finance, intellectual property, publicity and privacy, and the First Amendment to the United States Constitution in the U.S.

Although entertainment law and media law are seen as the same thing, it is important to know the difference between the two.

For film, entertainment attorneys work with the actor's agent to finalize the actor's contracts for upcoming projects. After an agent lines up work for an actor, the entertainment attorney negotiates with the agent and buyer of the actor's talent for compensation and profit participation. Entertainment attorneys are under strict confidentiality agreements, so the jobs of their clients are kept top secret. But, some entertainment attorney's job descriptions have become comparable to those of a star's agent, manager or publicist. Most entertainment attorneys have many other roles as well such as assisting in building a client's career.

== History ==
As the popularity of media became widespread, the field of media law became more in demand, enticing certain corporate professionals wanting to participate more in media. As a result, many young lawyers fledged into media law for the opportunity to build more connections in media, to become a media presenter, or even land an acting role. As technology continues to make huge advancements, many lawsuits have begun to arise, which makes the demand for lawyers extremely necessary.

== Copyright ==
Copyright law in regards to entertainment law is the foundation of intellectual property protection in the entertainment industry. When someone creates a piece of work, whether it be a script, film, painting, photograph or some sort of original piece, the creator of this work has exclusive rights to their work. This makes them a copyright owner of their piece. To make sure that your piece of work is under copyright protection, the U.S. Copyright Office provides a public record of ownership, helping the creator establish rights in case of disputes. Without the creator registering with the copyright office, they may experience trouble being able to sue another individual or company if someone else tries to take credit for their work or use it without consent.

== Trademarks ==
Trademark's role in entertainment law is to protect a person or company's ability to brand and market a product or service. A trademark can be anything from a word, phrase, symbol design, or a combination of these things all together that lets consumers identify your company or brand. By being able to identify a brand's trademark, consumers are able to distinguish between brands and knowing which one may be higher quality. Companies are able to register their trademarks with the U.S. Patent and Trademark Office, which helps protect the company's identity or from others using their logo without permission.

== Right of publicity ==
In entertainment law, the right of publicity is a right to legal action. This helps protect against the misappropriation of a person's name, likeness, and other things like a nickname, pseudonym, voice of signature, likeness, or photograph for commercial benefit. It's important to note the difference of right of privacy and right of publicity. When it comes to the right of privacy, this is designed to guard an individual's personal rights against emotional distress vs. the right of publicity being seen protecting a property right.

== Categories ==
Entertainment law is generally sub-divided into the following areas related to the types of activities that have their own specific trade unions, production techniques, rules, customs, case law, and negotiation strategies:

- FILM: option agreements, chain of title issues, talent agreements (screenwriters, film directors, actors, composers, production designers), production and post production and trade union issues, distribution issues, motion picture industry negotiations, distribution, and general intellectual property issues especially relating to copyright and, to a lesser extent, trademarks;
- INTERNET: Censorship, Copyright, Freedom of information, Information Technology, Privacy, and Telecommunications issues;
- MULTIMEDIA: software licensing issues, video game development and production, Information technology law, and general intellectual property issues;
- MUSIC: talent agreements (musicians, composers), producer agreements, and synchronization rights, music industry negotiation and general intellectual property issues, especially relating to copyright (see music law);
- PUBLISHING and PRINT MEDIA: advertising, models, author agreements and general intellectual property issues, especially relating to copyright;
- TELEVISION and RADIO: broadcast licensing and regulatory issues, mechanical licenses, and general intellectual property issues, especially relating to copyright;
- THEATRE: rental agreements and co-production agreements, and other performance oriented legal issues;
- VISUAL ARTS AND DESIGN: fine arts, issues of consignment of artworks to art dealers, moral rights of sculptors regarding works in public places; and industrial design, issues related to the protection of graphic design elements in products.

Defamation (libel and slander), personality rights and privacy rights issues also arise in entertainment law.

Media law is a legal field that refers to the following:

- Advertising
- Broadcasting
- Censorship
- Confidentiality
- Contempt
- Copyright
- Corporate Law
- Defamation
- Entertainment
- Freedom of information
- Internet
- Information Technology
- Privacy
- Telecommunications

== Cases ==
- Copyright: In Golan v. Holder, the Supreme Court ruled, in a 6–2 vote, the judges dismissed contentions in light of the First Amendment and the Constitution's copyright provision, stating that the general population was not "a class of sacred centrality" and that copyright insurances may be extended regardless of whether they did not strive for new attempts to be made.
- Internet: In 2007, Viacom, a media aggregate that possesses MTV and Comedy Central TV, sued YouTube for $1 billion in light of copyright infringement claims for the unapproved posting of Viacom copyrighted material. In May 2008, YouTube began utilizing its advanced fingerprinting innovation to secure copyright-ensured content.
- Television: In an 8-0 decision, the Supreme Court held that in light of the fact that the FCC rules at the time did not cover "short lived exclamations," the fines issued against Fox were unethical and subsequently discredited as "illegally unclear".
- Music: Kesha v. Dr. Luke – In 2014, singer Kesha filed a civil suit against music producer Lukasz Sebastian Gottwald, also referred to some as Dr. Luke for gender-based hate crimes and emotional distress. This civil suit caused Gottwald to in return sue Kesha for defamation and breach of contract. This case ended with a judge declining to release Kesha from her binding contract that prohibited her from continuing her career effectively. The judge took note that Kesha had entered an agreement after she had sworn under oath that no harassment was taking place. Many celebrities such as Miley Cyrus, Lady Gaga, and Demi Lovato have shown support for Kesha in an attempt to broadcast the injustice contract laws have played in the outcome of this case. Singer-songwriter Taylor Swift donated $250,000 to relieve Kesha of any financial obligations.
- Right of publicity: Haelan Laboratories, Inc. v. Topps Chewing Gum, Inc.- in 1953 Haelan Laboratories held an exclusive legal right to use the baseball players’ photographs—beyond simply avoiding liability—which Topps Chewing Gum violated by persuading the players to break their contracts with Haelan. The U.S. Court of Appeals held that Haelan Laboratories had the legal right, being right of publicity, to the exclusive use of the baseball player's photographs and that Topps Chewing Gum infringed this right by causing breaches in Haelan's contracts.

== See also ==
- Communications law – Regulation of electronic communications
- Engineering law
- Intellectual property – Ownership of creative expressions and processes
- Media reform
- Media regulation – Laws on mass media
- Morals clause – Contractual provision
- Music law – Legal aspects of the music industry
- Performing arts – Art forms involving live performance
- Performing arts education
- Safe listening – Avoiding hearing damage from intentionally heard sounds
- Sports law – Law and regulations that relate to Sports
- Sunshine in the Courtroom Act
- Theater law – 2012 Japanese legislation
