= Big Brother 6 (American season) =

Big Brother
- Season 6
- Big Brother 6 logo
- Hosted by: Julie Chen
- No. of days: 80
- No. of houseguests: 14
- Winner: Maggie Ausburn
- Runner-up: Ivette Corredero
- Companion show: House Calls
- No. of episodes: 30

Release
- Original network: CBS
- Original release: July 7 – September 20, 2005

Additional information
- Filming dates: July 3 – September 20, 2005

Season chronology
- ← Previous; Season 5 Next → Season 7

Big Brother 6 is the sixth season of the American reality television series Big Brother. It is based upon the Dutch series of the same name, which gained notoriety in 1999 and 2000. The season premiered on CBS on July 7, 2005, and lasted eleven weeks until the live finale on September 20, 2005. This season was the second to be accompanied by the House Calls: The Big Brother Talk Show spin-off series, which was viewable online and discussed the events of the game. The sixth season saw a moderate decline in ratings. The season premiered to a total of 8.47 million viewers, the lowest premiere numbers since 2001. Though the finale had a total of ten million viewers, the series averaged 7.24 million viewers, a series low at the time. Big Brother 6 featured a total of 14 HouseGuests, the same number that was featured in the previous season. This was the highest number of initial HouseGuests to enter the house, due to the twin twist the previous season. The series ended after 80 days, in which HouseGuest Maggie Ausburn was crowned the Winner, and Ivette Corredero the Runner-Up.

== Format ==
The format remained largely unchanged from previous seasons. HouseGuests were sequestered in the Big Brother House with no contact to and from the outside world. Each week, the HouseGuests took part in several compulsory challenges that determined who would win food, luxuries, and power in the House. The winner of the Head of Household competition was immune from nominations and was instructed to nominate two fellow HouseGuests for eviction. After a HouseGuest became Head of Household he or she was ineligible to take part in the next Head of Household competition. HouseGuests also took part in a weekly food competition, with the losing team being placed on the peanut butter and jelly diet for a week. Some competitions allowed all HouseGuests to earn food for the week, while others cause them all to lose food for the week. The winner of the Power of Veto competition won the right to save one of the nominated HouseGuests from eviction. If the Veto winner exercised the power, the Head of Household then had to nominate another HouseGuest for eviction. In a minor format twist exclusive to this season, the HouseGuests were told that some Veto Competitions would possibly result in no winner, and no veto power being held. This did not eventuate in an impactful way, as all Veto Competitions were won.

On eviction night, all HouseGuests except for the Head of Household and the two nominees voted to evict one of the two nominees. This compulsory vote was conducted in the privacy of the Diary Room. In the event of a tie, the Head of Household would break the tie and reveal their vote in front of the other HouseGuests. Unlike other versions of Big Brother, the HouseGuests could discuss the nomination and eviction process open and freely. The nominee with the most votes from the other HouseGuests was evicted from the House on Thursday and interviewed by Julie Chen. HouseGuests could voluntarily leave the House at any time and those who broke the rules were expelled by Big Brother. The last seven evictees of the season, known as the jury members, voted for the winner on the season finale. The jury members were sequestered in a separate house and were not allowed to watch the show except for segments that included all of the HouseGuests. The jury members were not shown any Diary Room interviews or any footage that included strategy or details regarding nominations.

Aside from the usual format, various changes were made for Big Brother 6. The main change was that each HouseGuest had a secret partner in the game. Unlike in Big Brother 9, the partners each competed as individuals, were nominated as individuals, and were evicted as individuals. The partners in the game had pre-existing relationships. April and Jennifer were sorority sisters, Ashlea and Janelle were former roommates, Beau and Ivette were former co-workers, Eric and Maggie are friends, as are Howie and Rachel, and Kaysar and Michael are neighbors. James was originally supposed to bring his friend Mike into the house as his secret partner, but Mike dropped out last minute without even telling James. James then picked his girlfriend, Sarah, to be his secret partner. Initially, each secret pair thought that they were the only secret pair. If both members of a secret pair reached the final two, the game's winner would receive a prize of $1 million, while the runner-up would receive $250,000. Despite this, the HouseGuests quickly figured it out, and host Julie Chen officially confirmed the twist minutes after the third live eviction.

== HouseGuests ==
| Name | Age | Occupation | Residence | Secret partner | Entry | Result |
|---|---|---|---|---|---|---|
| Maggie Ausburn | 26 | Emergency room nurse | Las Vegas, Nevada | Eric | Day 1 | Winner; Day 80 |
| Ivette Corredero | 25 | Waitress | Miami, Florida | Beau | Day 1 | Runner-up; Day 80 |
| Janelle Pierzina | 25 | VIP cocktail waitress | Miami Beach, Florida | Ashlea | Day 1 | Evicted; Day 76 |
| April Lewis | 30 | Pharmaceutical sales representative | Dallas, Texas | Jennifer | Day 1 | Evicted; Day 73 |
| Howie Gordon | 34 | Meteorology student | Chicago, Illinois | Rachel | Day 1 | Evicted; Day 68 |
| Beau Beasley | 25 | Personal shopper | Pembroke Pines, Florida | Ivette | Day 1 | Evicted; Day 63 |
| James Rhine | 29 | Loss prevention manager | Miami, Florida | Sarah | Day 1 | Evicted; Day 61 |
| Rachel Plencner | 33 | Horse breeder | Parker, Colorado | Howie | Day 1 | Evicted; Day 54 |
| Jennifer Vasquez | 27 | Arena football league dancer | Plano, Texas | April | Day 1 | Evicted; Day 49 |
| Kaysar Ridha | 24 | Graphic designer | Irvine, California | Michael | Day 40 | Evicted; Day 47 |
| Kaysar Ridha | 24 | Graphic designer | Irvine, California | Michael | Day 1 | Evicted; Day 33 |
| Sarah Hrejsa | 23 | Retail manager | Chicago, Illinois | James | Day 1 | Evicted; Day 40 |
| Eric Littmann | 36 | Firefighter | Boston, Massachusetts | Maggie | Day 1 | Evicted; Day 26 |
| Michael Donnellan | 28 | Artist | Orange County, California | Kaysar | Day 1 | Evicted; Day 19 |
| Ashlea Evans | 22 | Fashion design student | Plantation, Florida | Janelle | Day 1 | Evicted; Day 12 |

=== Future appearances ===
Janelle Pierzina, James Rhine, Howie Gordon, and Kaysar Ridha returned to compete on Big Brother: All-Stars in 2006. Ivette Corredero was a candidate to return for that season, but ultimately was not selected. April Lewis and Eric Littman also made appearances that season during competitions. Janelle went on to make brief appearances in seasons eight, ten, and eleven. Janelle returned as a coach in 2012 for Big Brother 14. Janelle competed on The Amazing Race 31 with Britney Haynes Godwin (from Big Brother 12). In 2020, Janelle and Kaysar returned to compete on Big Brother 22. In 2022, Janelle was a contestant on the USA Network reality competition series, Snake in the Grass. She also went to compete on the second season of The Traitors.

== Summary ==
On Day 1, the original fourteen HouseGuests entered the house. This season featured a total of eight women and six men, making it the only season to feature more female than male HouseGuests. That same night, the HouseGuests competed in the "Wipe Out" food competition. For this competition, HouseGuests split into two groups of seven, with each team standing on a surfboard in the center of a large pool. The people in the back of the surfboard were required to grab coconuts and get them to the front, while the person in the front attempts to throw the coconuts into a goal. The team with the most points at the end of the competition would be the winners, and would advance to the Head of Household competition. The team of Ashlea, Beau, Eric, Ivette, Jennifer, Kaysar, and Michael were placed on the peanut butter and jelly diet, and were not eligible to compete for Head of Household. The winning team then learned they would compete for the title of Head of Household by standing on their surfboard for the longest time. HouseGuests were not permitted to step off of the surfboard for any reason, otherwise they would be eliminated from the competition. While on the board, the seven players made a deal to not nominate one another. Ultimately, the group allowed Rachel to become the first Head of Household of the season after a two and a half hour competition. Shortly afterwards, Eric, James, Kaysar, and Michael made a deal to keep each other safe due to the larger number of women than men in the house.

On Day 3, Rachel chose to nominate Ashlea and Kaysar for eviction. While looking at the spy screen in the Head of Household bedroom, Rachel discovered that there was a secret room in the house. Following an extensive search with numerous hints, Rachel found the new bedroom, which included a key to the hot tub. Also included were three locked safes, which the HouseGuests did not have a key for yet. When picking players for the Power of Veto competition, Rachel selected Maggie, while Kaysar selected Eric and Ashlea chose Howie; Ivette was selected to host the competition. On Day 7, the HouseGuests competed in the "Rec-Tangled" Power of Veto competition. For this competition, HouseGuests were teamed up with the HouseGuest they selected to participate, and had to unravel a Power of Veto symbol from a string of tangled knots. The first member of the team to grab the Veto symbol and place it on a pole would be the winner of the competition. Ultimately, Rachel was the winner of the Power of Veto. When she found Jennifer in her bedroom, Rachel debated removing Ashlea from the block and replacing her with Jennifer; however, she ultimately chose to leave the nominations intact. On Day 12, Ashlea became the first HouseGuest to be evicted from the house in a vote of nine to two.

Following Ashlea's eviction, HouseGuests competed in the "Fast & Easy" Head of Household competition. For this competition, HouseGuests attempted to answer a question without being the last one to do so. Being the last to answer resulted in eliminated, while an incorrect answer would also lead to elimination. Ultimately, Eric was the winner of the competition. On Day 13, HouseGuests competed in the "Snack Shack from Hell" food competition. For this competition, HouseGuests partnered up and were required to eat various disgusting foods. Each pair represented a food group, and successfully finishing their meal would earn the HouseGuests the food group for the week. That same day, Eric chose to go back on his deal with the men of the house by nominating Janelle and Michael for eviction, with Michael being his main target. These nominations, along with Michael speaking badly of Eric, led to an altercation in the backyard between Eric and Michael that required production to intervene; minutes later, production also had to separate Kaysar and Ivette. When picking players for the Power of Veto competition, Eric chose James to compete, while Janelle chose Rachel and Michael chose Howie; Beau was selected to host the competition. On Day 14, HouseGuests competed in the "High and Dry" Power of Veto competition. For this competition, HouseGuests played against the person they selected, and were required to transport cups of water across the backyard on a zipline. They would use the cups of water to fill a box in the backyard, and the first HouseGuest to retrieve the ball out of their box would be the winner. Ultimately, James was the winner of the competition. James later decided to leave Janelle and Michael nominated, choosing not to use the Power of Veto. On Day 19, Michael became the second HouseGuest to be evicted from the house in a vote of nine to one.

Following Michael's eviction, HouseGuests competed in the "Majority Rules" Head of Household competition. For this competition, players had to answer questions while attempting to remain in the majority. If they answered outside of the majority, they were eliminated. When it came down to James, Janelle, Kaysar, and Maggie in a tie-breaker round, Kaysar became the new Head of Household. On Day 20, the HouseGuests competed in the "Will Spell for Food" food competition. For this competition, HouseGuests attempted to correctly spell words that were food items. Each correct answer allowed the group to remove a slot from a wheel. If the wheel landed on an empty slot, they won food for the week; the HouseGuests lost food for the week. That same day, Kaysar chose to nominate James and Maggie for eviction. Following these nominations, Kaysar formed the "Sovereign Six" alliance, consisting of himself, Janelle, Howie, Rachel, James and Sarah. When picking players for the Power of Veto competition, Kaysar chose Howie, James chose Janelle, and Maggie chose Ivette; April was selected to host. On Day 21, HouseGuests competed in the "Knight Moves" Power of Veto competition. For this competition, HouseGuests had to move in an "L" formation on a life-sized chess board in an attempt to be the last HouseGuest remaining. Ultimately, James was the winner of the Power of Veto for the second week in a row. Shortly afterwards, Eric learned that he would be nominated as the replacement nominee, leading to numerous arguments in the house. James later chose to use the Power of Veto on himself, with Kaysar nominating Eric for eviction. On Day 26, Eric became the third HouseGuest to be evicted from the house in a vote of five to four.

Following Eric's eviction, HouseGuests competed in the "Power Roller" Head of Household competition. For this competition, HouseGuests had to roll a ball down a strip in an attempt to get their ball closest to a hole at the end without falling in. The strip also had other holes, and if a HouseGuests ball fell into a hole they were eliminated. Ultimately, Maggie was the winner of the competition. Following this, April, Beau, Ivette, Jennifer, and Maggie formed "The Friendship" alliance, officially splitting the house into two sides. Maggie took over the leader role of the alliance. On Day 27, HouseGuests participated in the "Matching the Munchies" food competition. For this competition, HouseGuests attempted to fill in the blanks of a situation by using the names of food items. If the contestants answer matched the panelists' answers, they would earn food for a day for a specific day of the week; the group won food for every day of the week, and also earned the combination for one of the safes in the gold room. Inside the safe was a plate of peanut butter and jelly sandwiches, one of which had a "PB&J Pass" inside; Janelle won this prize. That same day, Maggie chose to nominate James and Kaysar for eviction, feeling they were the main reason Eric had been evicted the previous week. When picking players for the Power of Veto competition, Maggie chose Beau, Kaysar chose Janelle, and James chose Sarah; Rachel was selected to host the competition. On Day 28, HouseGuests competed in the "Couch Potato" Power of Veto competition. For this competition, HouseGuests had to change the channel on a television by throwing tennis balls at it. Sarah was the winner of the competition, giving Sarah her first win of the season. On Day 29, six of the HouseGuests competed to earn the right to watch the new film Four Brothers. The team of Beau, Ivette, and Maggie competed against Jennifer, Rachel, and Sarah in the "Big Brother Movie Marquee" luxury competition. For this competition, HouseGuests had to uncover a message by screwing lights into a wall. The team of Jennifer, Rachel, and Sarah won the right to watch the movie. Sarah later chose to use the Power of Veto on James, with Janelle being nominated in his place. On Day 33, Kaysar became the fourth HouseGuest to be evicted from the house in a vote of seven to one.

Following Kaysar's eviction, HouseGuests competed in the "Eliminator" Head of Household competition. For this competition, HouseGuests were quizzed on events that had occurred in the house. The first HouseGuest to buzz in and answer correctly could eliminate one player from the competition, with the last remaining HouseGuest being the winner; Howie was the winner of the competition. Shortly afterwards, the HouseGuests learned that a previously evicted HouseGuest would be returning to the game in one week; Ashlea was not eligible as she had left sequester. On Day 34, HouseGuests split into teams to participate in the "Conveyer Belch" food competition. For this competition, HouseGuests were required to eat various sweet foods as they came out on a conveyor belt. All uneaten food was later weighed, and the team with the lowest amount of wasted food was the winner. This left the team of April, Beau, Maggie, Ivette, and Janelle on the peanut butter and jelly diet; however, Janelle had the "PB&J Pass" and was immune from the punishment. That same day, Howie nominated "Sovereign" alliance members James and Sarah for eviction, feeling the entire house wanted them out. When picking players for the Power of Veto competition, Howie chose Rachel, Sarah chose Jennifer, and James chose Ivette; Janelle was selected to host. On Day 35, HouseGuests competed in the "A Lotta Pinata" Power of Veto competition. For this competition, each player had a personalized pinata, and the HouseGuests had to distribute candy into the six pinatas. The HouseGuest whose pinata had the most pieces of candy without going over twenty would be the winner of the Power of Veto; James was the winner of the Power of Veto. James chose to use the Power of Veto to remove himself from the block, with Ivette being nominated in his place. On Day 40, Sarah became the fifth HouseGuest to be evicted in a vote of six to one. Minutes later, it was revealed that the viewers had chosen Kaysar to return to the house, having received 82% of the public vote.

Following Sarah's eviction, HouseGuests competed in the "Pressure Cooker" endurance Head of Household competition. For this competition, HouseGuests stood inside a glass box while holding down a button. When a HouseGuest let go of their button, they were eliminated from the competition. Once a HouseGuest was eliminated, they could open a box of their choice in the center of the glass room, with the box holding either a reward or punishment. Jennifer was the winner of the competition, which lasted more than fourteen hours. During the competition, Jennifer promised Kaysar that she would backdoor James that week. On Day 41, Jennifer chose to nominate Janelle and Rachel for eviction. When picking players for the Power of Veto competition, Jennifer chose April, Rachel chose Howie, and Janelle chose Kaysar; Maggie was selected to host. On Day 42, HouseGuests competed in the "Coast for the Most" Power of Veto competition. For this competition, HouseGuests had coasters with the faces of the previously evicted HouseGuests on them, and they were required to throw them at a layered platform. A HouseGuest earned a point for each coaster they threw at the correct platform, and the HouseGuest with the most points would win the Power of Veto; Rachel was the winner of the Power of Veto. Rachel later chose to use the Power of Veto on herself, with Jennifer choosing Kaysar to be the replacement nominee. Jennifer's betrayal led to numerous arguments in the house, including an instance in which Beau and Janelle had a physical altercation. On Day 47, Kaysar was evicted for the second time in a unanimous vote of seven to zero.

Following Kaysar's second eviction, HouseGuests competed in the "Face the Facts" Head of Household competition. For this competition, HouseGuests answered questions that dealt with the previously evicted HouseGuests. Janelle was the winner of this competition. Following her win, the HouseGuests learned that this would be a Double Eviction week, and that Janelle would immediately make her nominations; she chose to nominate Jennifer and Maggie for eviction. When picking players for the Power of Veto competition, Janelle chose Howie, Jennifer chose April, and Maggie chose Ivette; Rachel was selected to host. On Day 48, HouseGuests competed in the "Goal For It" Power of Veto competition. For this competition, HouseGuests attempted to shoot various pucks into different goals in the quickest amount of time; Janelle was the winner of the competition. Janelle later made the decision to remove Maggie from the block, replacing her with Ivette. This made it the first time in Big Brother history that the HoH had chosen to change their nominations. On Day 49, Jennifer became the sixth HouseGuest to be evicted from the house in a vote of five to one. She became the first member of the Jury of Seven. Following Jennifer's eviction, HouseGuests competed in the "On the House" Head of Household competition. For this competition, HouseGuests answered questions about items in the house; Beau was the winner. On Day 50, Beau chose to nominate Howie and Rachel for eviction, with Rachel being his main target. When picking players for the Power of Veto competition, Beau chose James, Howie chose Janelle, and Rachel chose April; this competition featured no host. On Day 51, HouseGuests competed in the "Get Your Pairings Straight" Power of Veto competition. In this competition, HouseGuests had to pair up images of the HouseGuests with their partners in the fastest time; James was the winner of the competition, giving James his fourth Power of Veto win. James later chose not to use the Power of Veto, leaving Howie and Rachel nominated. On Day 54, Rachel became the seventh HouseGuest to be evicted from the house in a unanimous vote of five to zero. She became the second member of the Jury of Seven.

Following Rachel's eviction, HouseGuests competed in the "High/Low" Head of Household competition. For this competition, HouseGuests were given a statement about the game that involved a number, and HouseGuests had to determine whether the answer was higher or lower than the given number by stepping upward or downward on a staircase. April was the winner of this competition. On Day 55, April chose to nominate Howie and Janelle for eviction, with the plan of backdooring James that week. When picking players for the Power of Veto competition, April chose Maggie, Janelle chose Ivette, and Howie chose Beau; James was the host. On Day 56, HouseGuests competed in the "Playing Dirty" Power of Veto competition. For this competition, HouseGuests attempted to dig through mud to find keys which would unlock Veto symbols. The first HouseGuest to unlock their three Veto symbols would win the Power of Veto; a fourth Veto symbol would also award a HouseGuest the combination to the second safe in the bedroom. April was the winner of the Power of Veto, while Janelle won the prize in the safe. Inside the safe was a trip for two to the Bahamas, which Janelle could use once she left the house. That same week, America voted for Janelle to receive a phone call from the person of her choice; she chose previously evicted HouseGuest Michael. April chose to use the veto to save Janelle, completing her backdoor plan of evicting James. On Day 61, James became the eighth HouseGuest to be evicted in a vote of four to zero. He became the third member of the Jury of Seven.

Following James's eviction, HouseGuests competed in the "Playing It Straight" Head of Household competition. For this competition, HouseGuests attempted to roll a bowling ball down a line for the longest length, with the HouseGuest who makes it farthest being the winner. Howie was the winner of the competition, making him the first person to win Head of Household twice this season. Minutes later, the HouseGuests learned that this would be a second Double Eviction Week, and that Howie had to immediately make his nominations. Howie chose to nominate Beau and Ivette for eviction, the last remaining pair in the house. On Day 63, Big Brother 5 HouseGuest Holly King entered the house to host the "Roll Me a Veto" Power of Veto competition. For this competition, HouseGuests wagered bets on being able to correctly answer questions about past events. Maggie was the winner of the competition. She later chose not to use the Power of Veto, ensuring either Beau or Ivette's eviction. On Day 63, Beau became the ninth HouseGuest to be evicted in a unanimous vote of three to zero. He became the fourth member of the Jury of Seven. Following Beau's eviction, HouseGuests competed in the "Magnetic Attraction" Head of Household competition. For this competition, HouseGuests were quizzed over comments made by the HouseGuests during their stay in the house, with HouseGuests answering questions by placing magnets on a specific side of a board. Ivette was the winner of the competition. On Day 64, Ivette chose to nominate Howie and Janelle for eviction. On Day 65, HouseGuests competed in the "Morph-O-Matic" Power of Veto competition. For this competition, HouseGuests had to figure out which three HouseGuests had been combined in various pictures in the quickest time. Janelle was the winner of the competition. On Day 68, Howie, the last man standing, became the tenth HouseGuest to be evicted from the house, with Ivette breaking a tie as the deciding vote. While the house now has an all female Final 4, Howie became the fifth member of the Jury of Seven.

Following Howie's eviction, HouseGuests competed in the "Before or After" Head of Household competition. For this competition, HouseGuests had to answer questions and determine whether a specific event happened before or after another event in the game. Janelle was the winner of the competition, answering every question correctly. Janelle later won an America's Vote poll, and was able to leave the house to visit the set of the CBS sitcom Two and a Half Men. On Day 69, Janelle chose to nominate Ivette and Maggie for eviction. On Day 70, the HouseGuests competed in the "Missing Link" final Power of Veto competition. For this competition, HouseGuests were required to make a chain out of the faces of the previously evicted HouseGuests by using clues that applied to potentially more than one HouseGuest. There were numerous answers for most questions, though there was only one correct full combination. The HouseGuest who finished the chain in the fastest time would be the winner. Ivette was the winner of the competition. Ivette chose to use the Power of Veto on herself, with April being the only eligible HouseGuest to be nominated in her place. On Day 73, Ivette cast the sole vote to evict April from the game. She became the sixth member of the Jury of Seven.

Following April's eviction, HouseGuests competed in the first round of the final Head of Household competition, called "The Key to Being Safe". For this endurance competition, HouseGuests had to balance on a combination dial while holding onto a key above their head. If a HouseGuest let go of their key or stepped off of the dial, they were eliminated from the competition. Ivette was the winner of the competition. For winning, she got to open the final safe in the gold room, and won two Vespa scooters. On Day 74, Janelle and Maggie competed against one another in the "Pad-Locked" competition, which was the second round of the final Head of Household competition. For this competition, HouseGuests attempted to unlock an oversized lock by figuring out a combination based on past events in the game. Janelle was the winner of the competition. On Day 76, Ivette and Janelle competed against one another in the final round of the Head of Household competition. In the "Jury Statements" competition, HouseGuests attempted to guess how a previously evicted HouseGuest would have finished a sentence. Following a tie-breaker round, Ivette became the final Head of Household of the season. She then cast the sole vote to evict Janelle, making Ivette and Maggie the Final Two. On Day 80, Maggie was crowned the winner of Big Brother 6 in a Jury vote of four to three.

== Episodes ==
| No. overall | No. in season | Title | Original release date | U.S. viewers (millions) |
|---|---|---|---|---|
| 198 | 1 | "Episode 1" | July 7, 2005 | 8.47 |
| 199 | 2 | "Episode 2" | July 12, 2005 | 8.34 |
| 200 | 3 | "Episode 3" | July 14, 2005 | 7.72 |
| 201 | 4 | "Episode 4" | July 16, 2005 | 5.03 |
| 202 | 5 | "Episode 5" | July 19, 2005 | 8.12 |
| 203 | 6 | "Episode 6" | July 21, 2005 | 7.85 |
| 204 | 7 | "Episode 7" | July 23, 2005 | 4.93 |
| 205 | 8 | "Episode 8" | July 26, 2005 | 8.16 |
| 206 | 9 | "Episode 9" | July 28, 2005 | 7.39 |
| 207 | 10 | "Episode 10" | July 30, 2005 | 5.13 |
| 208 | 11 | "Episode 11" | August 2, 2005 | 8.56 |
| 209 | 12 | "Episode 12" | August 4, 2005 | 7.70 |
| 210 | 13 | "Episode 13" | August 6, 2005 | 4.94 |
| 211 | 14 | "Episode 14" | August 9, 2005 | 8.11 |
| 212 | 15 | "Episode 15" | August 11, 2005 | 7.17 |
| 213 | 16 | "Episode 16" | August 13, 2005 | 5.46 |
| 214 | 17 | "Episode 17" | August 16, 2005 | 8.70 |
| 215 | 18 | "Episode 18" | August 18, 2005 | 8.24 |
| 216 | 19 | "Episode 19" | August 20, 2005 | 5.85 |
| 217 | 20 | "Episode 20" | August 23, 2005 | 7.95 |
| 218 | 21 | "Episode 21" | August 25, 2005 | 7.76 |
| 219 | 22 | "Episode 22" | August 30, 2005 | 8.25 |
| 220 | 23 | "Episode 23" | September 1, 2005 | 6.33 |
| 221 | 24 | "Episode 24" | September 3, 2005 | 4.94 |
| 222 | 25 | "Episode 25" | September 6, 2005 | 8.08 |
| 223 | 26 | "Episode 26" | September 8, 2005 | 7.48 |
| 224 | 27 | "Episode 27" | September 10, 2005 | 5.83 |
| 225 | 28 | "Episode 28" | September 13, 2005 | 7.85 |
| 226 | 29 | "Episode 29" | September 16, 2005 | 6.94 |
| 227 | 30 | "Episode 30" | September 20, 2005 | 8.15 |

== Voting history ==
Color key:

Winner
Runner-up
Head of Household
Nominated for eviction
Evicted
Re-entered the game

Voting history (season 6)
| | Week 1 | Week 2 | Week 3 | Week 4 | Week 5 | Week 6 | Week 7 (Note: This week was a fast forward week. The HouseGuests played a week's worth of games, including Head of Household and veto competitions, and nomination, veto and eviction ceremonies, within 48 hours.) | | Week 8 | Week 9 | | Week 10 | Week 11 | |
| | Week 1 | Week 2 | Week 3 | Week 4 | Week 5 | Week 6 | Day 49 | Day 54 | Week 8 | Day 63 | Day 68 | Week 10 | Day 76 | Finale |
|---|---|---|---|---|---|---|---|---|---|---|---|---|---|---|
| Head of Household | Rachel | Eric | Kaysar | Maggie | Howie | Jennifer | Janelle | Beau | April | Howie | Ivette | Janelle | Ivette | (None) |
| Nominations (initial) | Ashlea; Kaysar | Janelle; Michael | James; Maggie | James; Kaysar | James; Sarah | Janelle; Rachel | Jennifer; Maggie | Howie; Rachel | Howie; Janelle | Beau; Ivette | Howie; Janelle | Ivette; Maggie | (None) | (None) |
| Veto winner | Rachel | James | James | Sarah | James | Rachel | Janelle | James | April | Maggie | Janelle | Ivette | (None) | (None) |
| Nominations (final) | Ashlea; Kaysar | Janelle; Michael | Eric; Maggie | Janelle; Kaysar | Ivette; Sarah | Janelle; Kaysar | Ivette; Jennifer | Howie; Rachel | Howie; James | Beau; Ivette | April; Howie | April; Maggie | Janelle; Maggie | (None) |
| Maggie | Ashlea | Michael | Nominated | Head of Household | Sarah | Kaysar | Jennifer | Rachel | James | Beau | Howie | Nominated | Nominated | Winner |
| Ivette | Ashlea | Michael | Maggie | Kaysar | Nominated | Kaysar | Nominated | Rachel | James | Nominated | Howie (Note: As the vote was tied, the Head of Household cast the tie-breaker vote.) | April | Janelle (Note: As Head of Household, Ivette chose to evict Janelle.) | Runner-up |
| Janelle | Kaysar | Nominated | Eric | Nominated | Sarah | Nominated | Head of Household | Rachel | James | Beau | April | Head of Household | Evicted (Day 76) | Ivette |
| April | Ashlea | Michael | Maggie | Kaysar | Sarah | Kaysar | Ivette | Rachel | Head of Household | Beau | Nominated | Nominated | Evicted (Day 73) | Maggie |
| Howie | Ashlea | Michael | Eric | Kaysar | Head of Household | Kaysar | Jennifer | Nominated | Nominated | Head of Household | Nominated | Evicted (Day 68) | | Maggie |
| Beau | Ashlea | Michael | Maggie | Kaysar | Sarah | Kaysar | Jennifer | Head of Household | James | Nominated | Evicted (Day 63) | | | Ivette |
| James | Kaysar | Michael | Eric | Janelle | Ivette | Kaysar | Jennifer | Rachel | Nominated | Evicted (Day 61) | | | | Ivette |
| Rachel | Head of Household | Michael | Eric | Kaysar | Sarah | Kaysar | Jennifer | Nominated | Evicted (Day 54) | | | | | Maggie |
| Jennifer | Ashlea | Michael | Maggie | Kaysar | Sarah | Head of Household | Nominated | Evicted (Day 49) | | | | | | Maggie |
| Kaysar | Nominated | Janelle | Head of Household | Nominated | Evicted (Day 33) | Nominated | Re-evicted (Day 47) | | | | | | | |
| Sarah | Ashlea | Michael | Eric | Kaysar | Nominated | Evicted (Day 40) | | | | | | | | |
| Eric | Ashlea | Head of Household | Nominated | Evicted (Day 26) | | | | | | | | | | |
| Michael | Ashlea | Nominated | Evicted (Day 19) | | | | | | | | | | | |
| Ashlea | Nominated | Evicted (Day 12) | | | | | | | | | | | | |
| Evicted | Ashlea; 9 of 11 votes to evict | Michael; 9 of 10 votes to evict | Eric; 5 of 9 votes to evict | Kaysar; 7 of 8 votes to evict | Kaysar won re-entry into game (Note: The audience had the chance to decide whether Michael, Eric, or Kaysar would be given a chance to re-enter to the house. The audience chose Kaysar. Since Ashlea had chosen to leave sequester, she was ineligible to return.) | Kaysar; 7 of 7 votes to evict | Jennifer; 5 of 6 votes to evict | Rachel; 5 of 5 votes to evict | James; 4 of 4 votes to evict | Beau; 3 of 3 votes to evict | Howie; 2 of 3 votes to evict | April; Ivette's choice to evict | Janelle; Ivette's choice to evict | Maggie; 4 votes to win |
| Evicted | Ashlea; 9 of 11 votes to evict | Michael; 9 of 10 votes to evict | Eric; 5 of 9 votes to evict | Kaysar; 7 of 8 votes to evict | Sarah; 6 of 7 votes to evict | Kaysar; 7 of 7 votes to evict | Jennifer; 5 of 6 votes to evict | Rachel; 5 of 5 votes to evict | James; 4 of 4 votes to evict | Beau; 3 of 3 votes to evict | Howie; 2 of 3 votes to evict | April; Ivette's choice to evict | Janelle; Ivette's choice to evict | Ivette; 3 votes to win |

== Production ==
=== Development ===
In September 2003, following the ratings success of Big Brother 4, Entertainment Weekly confirmed that CBS had renewed the series leading up until 2006, ensuring three more seasons to air during the Summer time period. This meant that Big Brother 6 was the second of these three seasons. Despite rumors of an All Star season, it was later confirmed this was not the case. Casting for the season began in late March, with producer Arnold Shapiro stating "Our goal this summer is to assemble the most colorful, competitive, and charismatic HouseGuests we’ve ever had. Right now, we’re seeking the most memorable and exciting competitors we can find." The fourteen HouseGuests for this season were revealed on June 30, 2005. That same day, the "Summer of Secrets" twist was revealed to the public. This season was the first to allow the Head of Household to blog while inside the house, a feature that would be carried out for all subsequent seasons. The HouseGuests officially entered the house on Sunday, July 3.

=== House ===
The house used for Big Brother 6 differed greatly from the house used for the first five seasons. The program was filmed at CBS Studios in Studio City, California. The production team was located in the second story of the House which included the story department, audio department and the switchers and shaders. The House was equipped with 47 cameras and 76 microphones to record the participants. The art department that created the competitions for the program was located outside the House. The main new addition to the house was the addition of a second floor, which was home to the Head of Household bedroom. The spy-screen, which made its debut in Big Brother 5, returned for this season. Another new addition was that of an indoor gym, which the HouseGuests had to unlock by figuring out the passcode. The House featured two bedrooms, excluding the Head of Household room. The first room featured ten beds, three sleeping bags, and a cot. Rachel, the first Head of Household, was later given clues to find a second bedroom, which she eventually did. The new bedroom is adjacent to the first, and featured two queen-sized beds. The room was entirely gold colored, and featured three safe boxes.

=== Prizes ===
The 14 HouseGuests this season were competing for the main prize of $500,000. The winner of the series, determined by the previously evicted HouseGuests sequestered in the Jury House, would win the $500,000 prize, while the Runner-Up would receive a $50,000 prize. If both of a set of two partners (predetermined before the start of the season) were to be the final two HouseGuests in the competition, the winner would receive a $1,000,000 prize with the runner up winning $250,000. Other than the main prize, various luxuries and prizes were given out throughout the season.

== Broadcast ==
Big Brother 6 was broadcast on CBS from July 7, 2005, to September 20, 2005. This season featured the same schedule that was used in the previous edition, with episodes airing on Tuesdays, Thursday, and Saturday each week. The Thursday episode, which aired at 8 pm Eastern Time, featured the live eviction and subsequent Head of Household competition taking place. During the live eviction, the show was hosted by Julie Chen. The Saturday episode, which aired at 8 pm Eastern Time, featured the food competition and nomination ceremony, as well as some highlights from the previous days. The Tuesday episode featured the Power of Veto competition and the Power of Veto ceremony, along with more highlights of recent events in the game. Some changes to the scheduling format were made.

This season saw the return of the fantasy game first introduced in the previous season. In the game, players would make a team of HouseGuests and earn points when a member of their time did certain things in the game. The website for the series also featured a "Love 'Em or Leave 'Em" poll, in which fans could monitor the popularity of the HouseGuests each week. Much like the previous editions, the live feeds were also available again for this season. HouseGuests enter the house a few days before the premiere, and the feeds are not live for the first few days. They later go live after the broadcast of the launch episode. This season saw the return of the spin-off series House Calls: The Big Brother Talk Show. The online webshow, hosted by Gretchen Massey and Big Brother 3 HouseGuest Marcellas Reynolds aired thirty-minute episodes on weeknights, and allowed fans to call in and express their opinions on the events of the game. Evicted HouseGuests were also interviewed on the series following their eviction.

== Reception ==
=== Ratings ===
Big Brother 6 averaged a total of 7.24 million viewers, the lowest for the series at the time. The season premiere had a total of 8.47 million viewers, ranking it first for the hour and in all key demographics. The Tuesday, July 12 episode of the series saw a total of 8.8 million viewers. The Thursday, July 14 eviction episode had a total of 7.9 million viewers, slightly down from previous episodes of the same season. For that week, Big Brother 6 came in tenth place in terms of ratings. The Tuesday, July 19 episode had a total of 8.3 million viewers, despite being delayed by 11 minutes. The Thursday, July 21 eviction episode had a total of 8 million viewers, ranking first for the night. This episode featured a 5.2 rating and a 10 share. The Tuesday, August 16 episode had a total of 9 million viewers, winning in numerous key demographics. The Thursday, August 18 episode featured a total of 8.4 million viewers. For that week, the series came in eleventh place in terms of average viewers. The Tuesday, August 23 episode had a total of 8 million viewers. The Thursday, August 25 episode had the same number of viewers, and ranked first in the hour. The Tuesday, September 6 episode drew in 8.1 million viewers, and came in first for the night. The special Friday, September 16 episode of the season had a total of 7.1 million viewers.

=== Critical response ===
In the second week, Eric Littman and Michael Donnellan got into a confrontation regarding comments Michael made about Eric's family. Earlier in the evening, Rachel, who was eavesdropping on Janelle and Michael in the Gold Room, overheard Michael make a poor joke about Eric's grandparents to Janelle. Rachel told Eric that she heard them badmouthing his family. Later that night, Eric and Ivette were outside discussing the incident when Michael went outside. Eric provoked Michael who retorted, calling Eric "a midget with a small penis." Eric lost all control going after Michael. The other HouseGuests blocked Eric's attack at Michael. Big Brother intervened, telling Eric to go to the Diary Room, and telling Michael to go to the storage room. Shortly afterwards, Ivette told Kaysar he had no respect for women, attacked Kaysar's beliefs, and made racial remarks. Big Brother intervened again, giving warnings to all HouseGuests. Eric apologized to his fellow HouseGuests, saying he would never hurt anyone.

== See also ==
- Big Brother (TV series)
