= Big Brother Seven =

Big Brother Seven may refer to:

- Big Brother (UK series 7)
- Big Brother 7 (US)
