= Big Brother 4 (American season) =

Big Brother
- Season 4
- Big Brother 4 logo
- Hosted by: Julie Chen
- No. of days: 82
- No. of houseguests: 13
- Winner: Jun Song
- Runner-up: Alison Irwin
- No. of episodes: 33

Release
- Original network: CBS
- Original release: July 8 – September 24, 2003

Additional information
- Filming dates: July 4 – September 24, 2003

Season chronology
- ← Previous; Season 3 Next → Season 5

Big Brother 4 is the fourth season of the reality television series Big Brother. The format of the program remained largely unchanged from previous seasons: a group of contestants, referred to as HouseGuests, are enclosed in the Big Brother House under the surveillance of cameras and microphones. Each week, the HouseGuests vote to evict one of their own until two HouseGuests remain on finale night. The winner will be decided by the last seven evicted HouseGuests, collectively known as the Big Brother Jury. Julie Chen returned to host this season. The winner of the series won a $500,000 grand prize, while the runner-up won $50,000. This season was also broadcast on E4 in the United Kingdom, beginning near the end of that country's fourth series.

== Format ==
HouseGuests are sequestered in the Big Brother House with no contact to or from the outside world. Each week, the HouseGuests take part in several compulsory challenges that determine who will win food, luxuries, and power in the House. The winner of the weekly Head of Household competition is immune from nominations and must nominate two fellow HouseGuests for eviction. After a HouseGuest becomes Head of Household, he or she is ineligible to take part in the next Head of Household competition. HouseGuests also take part in food competitions in which they must win in order to eat regular foods. Losers of the competition are put on a peanut butter and jelly diet. The winner of the Power of Veto competition wins the right to save one of the nominated HouseGuests from eviction. If the Veto winner exercises the power, the Head of Household must then nominate another HouseGuest for eviction.

On eviction night, all HouseGuests except for the Head of Household and the two nominees vote to evict one of the two nominees. This compulsory vote is conducted in the privacy of the Diary Room by the host Julie Chen. In the event of a tie, the Head of Household must publicly cast a deciding vote to resolve a tie. Unlike other versions of Big Brother, the HouseGuests may discuss the nomination and eviction process openly and freely. The nominee with the greater number of votes will be evicted from the House on the live Thursday broadcast, exiting to an adjacent studio to be interviewed by Chen. HouseGuests can be removed from Big Brother for any rule violation or exhibiting disruptive behavior such as violence, or may voluntarily leave the house but they are not allowed to return to the game, such as the case of Scott Weintraub during the season.

Some changes from previous seasons were implemented throughout the course of the game. The main twist for the year was The X-Factor. Eight HouseGuests were introduced, only to have five HouseGuests' exes compete against them in the game. Another change in the format, introduced in the last veto contest of Big Brother 3, was the Golden Power of Veto, in that if a nominated person won such a veto, they would be allowed to take themselves off consideration for voting, which was not allowed when the veto was introduced originally the year before, in addition to casting a sole vote for eviction during the Final four. Since its inclusion, the Golden Power of Veto has appeared in subsequent seasons, albeit with only minor changes.

Due to a possibility of a tie and an America's vote is required to resolve a tie, a change was made to the Jury beginning this season whereas the Jury was reduced to the last seven evicted HouseGuests (which would remain until season 14 before expanding to nine members) who formed the jury that determined the eventual outcome. Unlike previous seasons where the evictees were sent back home and could watch the series freely, jurors were placed in a separate house. Jurors were not allowed to watch the show, except for competitions and ceremonies that include all of the remaining HouseGuests. They still had access to the Diary Room but footage of the interviews, including potential strategy or details regarding nominations, were not shown on air.

== HouseGuests ==
Partial cast of the fourth season of Big Brother. Top: Scott, David, Jack and Nathan Bottom: Jun, Erika, Dana and Alison Not Pictured: Amanda, Jee, Justin, Robert and Michelle

Thirteen HouseGuests were cast for this season of Big Brother. One of the original selections, Brandon Showalter, of Newport Beach, California, was kicked off of the show during the sequester period after it was revealed he had communicated with his girlfriend. As part of this season's twist, five of the original eight HouseGuests were shocked to find that an ex would be playing the game with them as part of the "Ex-Factor" twist. The exes were Jun and Jee, Alison and Justin, Erika and Robert, David and Michelle, and Amanda and Scott.

Name	Age	Occupation	Residence	Ex	Result
Jun Song	27	Investment manager	New York, New York	Jee	Winner; Day 82
Alison Irwin	22	Retail sales manager	Pittsburgh, Pennsylvania	Justin	Runner-up; Day 82
Robert Roman	32	Restaurant manager	Los Angeles, California	Erika	Evicted; Day 75
Erika Landin	33	Pilates instructor	Los Angeles, California	Robert	Evicted; Day 68
Jee Choe	23	Bookkeeper	Elmhurst, New York	Jun	Evicted; Day 61
Jack Owens	58	Retired FBI agent	Birmingham, Alabama	—N/a	Evicted; Day 54
Justin Giovinco	22	Headhunter	Pittsburgh, Pennsylvania	Alison	Evicted; Day 47
Nathan Marlow	23	Personal trainer	Edmond, Oklahoma	—N/a	Evicted; Day 40
Dana Varela	28	Karate school manager	Bayside, New York	—N/a	Evicted; Day 33
David Lane	21	Former army ranger	Deerfield Beach, Florida	Michelle	Evicted; Day 26
Michelle Maradie	19	College student	Boca Raton, Florida	David	Evicted; Day 19
Amanda Craig	27	Bar manager	Chicago, Illinois	Scott	Evicted; Day 12
Scott Weintraub	32	Waiter	Chicago, Illinois	Amanda	Expelled; Day 8

=== Future appearances ===
Alison Irwin competed on The Amazing Race 5 with her then-boyfriend Donny Patrick. Alison Irwin and Erika Landin returned to compete on Big Brother 7: All-Stars. Dana Varela was also a candidate for Big Brother: All-Stars, but was not selected. Jun Song and Jack Owens both made brief appearances on Big Brother: All-Stars during competitions. Jun Song also made an appearance on Big Brother 10 to host a food competition along with other Big Brother alumni.

== Summary ==
On Day 1, Alison, Dana, David, Erika, Jack, Jun, Nathan, and Scott entered the Big Brother House. Upon getting to know one another, they competed in the "X Marks the Spot" food competition, in which everyone successfully earned food for the first week. Upon returning inside, they were informed of the X-Factor twist, in which five more HouseGuests would be entering the game, and would be exes of some of the eight already in the house. Following this announcement, Amanda, Jee, Justin, Michelle, and Robert entered the House. On Day 3, HouseGuests partnered up and competed in the "Who's Ya Chum?" Head of Household competition. Though Alison and Nathan won the endurance portion of the competition, Scott chose which of the two would become the first HoH; he chose Nathan. On Day 5, he nominated Amanda and Jee for eviction. On Day 7, Dana won the "Feeling Knotty" Power of Veto competition and chose to keep nominations the same. On Day 8, Scott was expelled from the game after a violent outburst in which he revealed he had a sexually transmitted disease. On Day 12, Amanda was evicted in a unanimous vote.

Following Amanda's eviction, the remaining HouseGuests competed in the "Majority Rules" HoH competition, in which they had to answer questions on how they felt the majority of the HouseGuests would vote. Jee was the winner of the competition. The following day, Michelle, David, Robert, Dana, and Nathan were put on the peanut butter and jelly diet after losing the "Clash of the Casseroles" food competition. Jee nominated Erika and Michelle for eviction on Day 13. On Day 14, David won the "Duck Ball" competition and chose to leave the nominations the same. On Day 19, Michelle was evicted in a six-to-two vote, only receiving the votes of Justin and Robert.

Following Michelle's eviction, HouseGuests competed in the "Everything In Three's" Head of Household competition, in which they faced off three at a time answering questions. Dana was the winner of the competition. On Day 20, all of the HouseGuests earned food for the week after the "Paratrooper" competition, in which they had to catch falling commando dolls in military hats. Each doll had the name of a food on it and if they got the doll they earned that food for the week. Later that day, Dana nominated Alison and Jack for eviction. The following day, Nathan won the Power of Veto and used it on Alison. David was named as her replacement nominee. On Day 22, Alison won the "Spin-O-Matic" luxury competition, earning her and another HouseGuest a luxury dinner. She chose to take Nathan with her. On Day 26, David was evicted in a five-to-two vote, only receiving the votes of Erika and Alison.

Following David's eviction, Alison won "Around the Water Cooler", in which HouseGuests had one minute to stack as many cans as possible by dropping them into a tube. Dana, Erika, Jee, and Robert were put on the peanut butter and jelly diet after losing the "Laying Pipe" food competition. Alison chose to nominate Dana and Jun for eviction. On Day 28, Robert won the "Snake In the Grass" Veto competition and chose to leave the nominations the same. On Day 33, Dana was evicted in a unanimous vote and become the first HouseGuest to enter sequester.

Following Dana's eviction, HouseGuests competed in the "Who Said It?" Head of Household competition, in which HouseGuests tried to guess which evicted HouseGuest made a certain statement while in the house. Justin won the competition. The following day, everyone earned food for the week during the "50 Ways to Cook a HouseGuest" food competition. Justin nominated Jack and Nathan for eviction. On Day 36, Robert won the "Quoridor" Power of Veto competition and chose not to use the Veto on either Jack or Nathan. On Day 40, Nathan was evicted in a unanimous vote, becoming the second member of the jury.

Following Nathan's eviction, HouseGuests competed in the "Steel Cage Match" endurance Head of Household competition, in which HouseGuests had to stay inside a steel cage, and were eliminated if they left. Erika won the competition. The following day, everyone earned food for five out of the seven days after the "Clambake From Hell" competition, as Justin and Alison were unable to complete their dishes in the allotted time. Erika nominated Justin and Robert for eviction later that day. On Day 43, Jun won the "Video Veto" Power of Veto competition and chose to leave nominations the same. On Day 47, Justin was evicted in a three-to-one vote, only receiving the vote of Jee.

Following Justin's eviction, HouseGuests competed in the "Black HoHle" Head of Household competition. Jee was the winner of the competition. He nominated Erika and Jack for eviction. The following day, Jee won the Power of Veto after forcing the other HouseGuests on the peanut butter and jelly diet for the week. He chose not to use the Power of Veto, leaving his nominations intact. Marcellas from Big Brother 3 returned briefly for a competition filled with gnomes where the winner would receive five McDonalds meals a day with one other houseguest of his/her choice. Jee won the task and chose Jack to join him. Despite Jee wanting Erika evicted that week, Jack was evicted in a two-to-one vote, only receiving the vote of Robert.

Following Jack's eviction, HouseGuests competed in the "Disappearing Act" Head of Household competition, which Jun won. Jun, as HoH, won a special trip outside of the Big Brother House to attend the 20th Annual MTV Video Music Awards. Her disappearance (as she entered the Diary Room and never returned) played a part in the Veto competition, as the HouseGuests had to guess where Jun was. Jun returned and nominated Jee and Alison. However, Alison won the Veto and used it on herself, forcing Jun to put Robert in her place. Despite Robert being a replacement for Alison, Jee was unanimously evicted.

Following Jee's eviction, Robert won the "Dearly Departed" Head of Household competition. The following day, everyone earned food during the "Mexotic Dinner" food competition. Robert chose to nominate Alison and Jun for eviction. The following day, Alison won the Diamond Power of Veto, which was the final Veto competition of the season. Alison removed herself from the block and Erika was named as her replacement. Alison then cast the sole vote against Erika on Day 68. The final Head of Household competition occurred in three parts. Alison won the first round, the endurance "On the House" competition. In the second part, Jun beat Robert in the "Unexpected Relations" competition, a challenge based on events that had taken place in the house. Alison and Jun then faced off in the Final Round of the HoH. After eight questions based on their ex-boyfriends Jee and Justin, the women were tied on four correct answers apiece. The tiebreaker question was "How many days did you date your ex for?", to which Alison answered zero days and Jun answered one million. Therefore, Alison emerged as the final Head of Household for the season and chose to evict Robert. On Day 82, Jun was crowned the winner of Big Brother 4 in a six-to-one vote, with Alison only receiving the vote of Nathan.

== Episodes ==
No. overall	No. in season	Title	Original release date	U.S. viewers (millions)
134	1	"Episode 1"	July 8, 2003	9.70
135	2	"Episode 2"	July 9, 2003	9.02
136	3	"Episode 3"	July 11, 2003	7.35
137	4	"Episode 4"	July 15, 2003	7.78
138	5	"Episode 5"	July 16, 2003	8.62
139	6	"Episode 6"	July 18, 2003	6.64
140	7	"Episode 7"	July 22, 2003	7.78
141	8	"Episode 8"	July 23, 2003	8.97
142	9	"Episode 9"	July 25, 2003	6.09
143	10	"Episode 10"	July 29, 2003	8.75
144	11	"Episode 11"	July 30, 2003	9.60
145	12	"Episode 12"	August 1, 2003	7.65
146	13	"Episode 13"	August 5, 2003	8.88
147	14	"Episode 14"	August 6, 2003	10.21
148	15	"Episode 15"	August 8, 2003	7.29
149	16	"Episode 16"	August 12, 2003	9.68
150	17	"Episode 17"	August 13, 2003	9.92
151	18	"Episode 18"	August 16, 2003	6.20
152	19	"Episode 19"	August 19, 2003	8.81
153	20	"Episode 20"	August 20, 2003	9.71
154	21	"Episode 21"	August 23, 2003	7.13
155	22	"Episode 22"	August 25, 2003	8.73
156	23	"Episode 23"	August 27, 2003	10.29
157	24	"Episode 24"	August 29, 2003	7.33
158	25	"Episode 25"	September 2, 2003	9.70
159	26	"Episode 26"	September 3, 2003	9.99
160	27	"Episode 27"	September 5, 2003	7.86
161	28	"Episode 28"	September 9, 2003	8.70
162	29	"Episode 29"	September 10, 2003	10.21
163	30	"Episode 30"	September 16, 2003	9.97
164	31	"Episode 31"	September 17, 2003	10.99
165	32	"Episode 32"	September 19, 2003	7.05
166	33	"Episode 33"	September 24, 2003	10.73

== Voting history ==
Color key:

Winner
Runner-up
Head of Household
Nominated for eviction
Evicted
Expelled by production

Voting history (season 4)
	Week 1	Week 2	Week 3	Week 4	Week 5	Week 6	Week 7	Week 8	Week 9	Week 10	Week 11
Head of Household	Nathan	Jee	Dana	Alison	Justin	Erika	Jee	Jun	Robert	Alison	(None)
Nominations (pre-veto)	Amanda; Jee	Erika; Michelle	Alison; Jack	Dana; Jun	Jack; Nathan	Justin; Robert	Erika; Jack	Alison; Jee	Alison; Jun	(None)	(None)
Veto winner	Dana	David	Nathan	Robert	Robert	Jun	Jee	Alison	Alison (Note: Alison won the Diamond Power of Veto, used the veto on herself and by default Erika was named as the replacement nominee.)	(None)	(None)
Nominations (post-veto)	Amanda; Jee	Erika; Michelle	David; Jack	Dana; Jun	Jack; Nathan	Justin; Robert	Erika; Jack	Jee; Robert	Erika; Jun	Jun; Robert	(None)
Jun	Amanda	Michelle	David	Nominated	Nathan	Justin	Jack	Head of Household	Nominated	Nominated	Winner
Alison	Amanda	Michelle	Jack	Head of Household	Nathan	Justin	Jack	Jee	Erika	Robert (Note: As Head of Household, Alison chose to evict Robert.)	Runner-up
Robert	Amanda	Erika	David	Dana	Nathan	Nominated	Erika	Nominated	Head of Household	Evicted (Day 75)	Jun
Erika	Amanda	Nominated	Jack	Dana	Nathan	Head of Household	Nominated	Jee	Nominated	Evicted (Day 68)	Jun
Jee	Nominated	Head of Household	David	Dana	Nathan	Robert	Head of Household	Nominated	Evicted (Day 61)		Jun
Jack	Amanda	Michelle	Nominated	Dana	Nominated	Justin	Nominated	Evicted (Day 54)			Jun
Justin	Amanda	Erika	David	Dana	Head of Household	Nominated	Evicted (Day 47)				Jun
Nathan	Head of Household	Michelle	David	Dana	Nominated	Evicted (Day 40)					Alison
Dana	Amanda	Michelle	Head of Household	Nominated	Evicted (Day 33)						Jun
David	Amanda	Michelle	Nominated	Evicted (Day 26)							
Michelle	Amanda	Nominated	Evicted (Day 19)								
Amanda	Nominated	Evicted (Day 12)									
Scott	Expelled (Day 8)										
Evicted	Amanda; 9 of 9 votes to evict	Michelle; 6 of 8 votes to evict	David; 5 of 7 votes to evict	Dana; 6 of 6 votes to evict	Nathan; 5 of 5 votes to evict	Justin; 3 of 4 votes to evict	Jack; 2 of 3 votes to evict	Jee; 2 of 2 votes to evict	Erika; Alison's choice to evict	Robert; Alison's choice to evict	Jun; 6 votes to win
Evicted	Amanda; 9 of 9 votes to evict	Michelle; 6 of 8 votes to evict	David; 5 of 7 votes to evict	Dana; 6 of 6 votes to evict	Nathan; 5 of 5 votes to evict	Justin; 3 of 4 votes to evict	Jack; 2 of 3 votes to evict	Jee; 2 of 2 votes to evict	Erika; Alison's choice to evict	Robert; Alison's choice to evict	Alison; 1 vote to win
