= Moonves =

Moonves (/ˈmuːnvɛz/) is a surname and may refer to:

- Julie Chen Moonves (born 1970), American television personality, news anchor and producer for CBS
- Les Moonves (born 1949), American media executive, chairman and CEO of CBS Corporation (2003–2018)
