= Big Brother: All-Stars =

Big Brother: All-Stars may refer to:

- Big Brother 7 (American season), the 2006 American Big Brother season and the first iteration of All-Stars format
- Big Brother 22 (American season), the 2020 American Big Brother season and the second iteration of All-Stars format
