= Big Brother 3 (American season) =

Big Brother
- Season 3
- Big Brother 3 logo
- Hosted by: Julie Chen
- No. of days: 82
- No. of houseguests: 12
- Winner: Lisa Donahue
- Runner-up: Danielle Reyes
- No. of episodes: 32

Release
- Original network: CBS
- Original release: July 10 – September 25, 2002

Additional information
- Filming dates: July 3 – September 25, 2002

Season chronology
- ← Previous; Season 2 Next → Season 4

Big Brother 3 is the third season of the American reality television series Big Brother. It is based upon the Netherlands series of the same name, which gained notoriety in 1999 and 2000. The season premiered on CBS on July 10, 2002 and lasted for a total of 82 days. The series concluded on September 25, 2002 when Lisa Donahue was crowned the winner, and Danielle Reyes the runner-up. The premise of the series remained similar to the previous season. The series revolved around twelve strangers living in a house together with no communication with the outside world. They were constantly filmed during their time in the house, and were not permitted to communicate with those filming them. One HouseGuest, known as the Head of Household, had the task of nominating two of their fellow HouseGuests for eviction. The Power of Veto was designed to let the winner take one of the eviction nominees off the block, but because it neither allowed an actual nominee to save themselves nor gave the winner any incentive to change the majority viewpoint without putting themselves in future jeopardy, it was useless and never played; future seasons would take the final Power of Veto twist, for a "Golden Veto" that a nominee could win and use to save themselves, and use it as the Veto standard for the entire game. The HouseGuests then voted to evict one of the nominees, with the HouseGuest who received the most votes being evicted from the house. When only two HouseGuests remained, the previously evicted HouseGuests would decide which of them would win the $500,000 grand prize.

== Format ==
Big Brother is a game show in which a group of contestants, referred to as HouseGuests, lived in a custom built "house", constantly under video surveillance. While in the house, the contestants were completely isolated from the outside world, meaning no phone, television, internet, magazines, newspaper, or contact with those not in the house. This rule could be broken, however, in the event of a family emergency or passing. At the start of each week in the house, the HouseGuests would compete for the title of Head of Household. The Head of Household for each week would have luxuries such as their own personal bedroom and free laundry service, but was responsible for nominating two HouseGuests for eviction. The Head of Household would not be able to compete in the following week's Head of Household competition, meaning that a HouseGuest could not hold the title for two weeks in a row. The winner of the Power of Veto could choose to save one of the nominated HouseGuests, forcing the Head of Household to nominate someone in their place. All HouseGuests excluding the Head of Household and nominees later vote to determine which of the two nominees should be evicted, and the nominated HouseGuest who received the most votes was evicted during a live episode. If there is a tie in the voting, the reigning Head of Household is required to make the tie-breaker decision. Unlike other versions of Big Brother, the HouseGuests may discuss the nomination and eviction process openly and freely. When only two HouseGuests remained, the previously evicted HouseGuests returned to decide which of the two should win the game.

The HouseGuests also competed in food competitions, in which the losers were required to solely eat peanut butter and jelly for the rest of the week. The HouseGuests also participated in weekly luxury competitions, in which those competing could win prizes. The players were competing for a $500,000 prize, though the runner-up would receive a $50,000 prize. The format of the series was mainly seen as a social experiment, and required HouseGuests to interact with others who may have differing ideals, beliefs, and prejudices. HouseGuests were also required to make visits to the Diary Room during their stay in the house, where they were able to share their thoughts and feelings on their fellow HouseGuests and the game. While in the house, the HouseGuests are given no information from the outside world. This includes the families and loved ones of the HouseGuests, whom they are not permitted to see or speak to. The house featured no telephones, televisions, or reading material other than for religious use. HouseGuests could voluntarily leave the house at any time, however, would not be able to return. In addition, a HouseGuest could be removed from the house at any time for breaking the rules; removal from the house meant the HouseGuest would not be eligible to return to the house or appear at the finale.

== HouseGuests ==
The cast of the third season of Big Brother. Top: Tonya, Chiara, Lori, Roddy, Jason, Gerry, Eric and Marcellas Bottom: Danielle, Amy, Lisa and Josh

Name	Age	Occupation	Residence	Entry	Result
Lisa Donahue	26	Bartender	Los Angeles, California	Day 1	Winner; Day 82
Danielle Reyes	30	Media buyer	Fairfield, California	Day 1	Runner-up; Day 82
Jason Guy	25	Videographer	Mobile, Alabama	Day 1	Evicted; Day 78
Amy Crews	24	Real estate appraiser	Memphis, Tennessee	Day 41	Evicted; Day 76
Amy Crews	24	Real estate appraiser	Memphis, Tennessee	Day 1	Evicted; Day 27
Marcellas Reynolds	32	Fashion designer	Chicago, Illinois	Day 1	Evicted; Day 69
Roddy Mancuso	30	Writer	Morristown, New Jersey	Day 1	Evicted; Day 62
Gerald "Gerry" Lancaster	51	Teacher	Shadow Hills, California	Day 1	Evicted; Day 55
Chiara "Kiki" Berti	25	Marketing representative	New York, New York	Day 1	Evicted; Day 48
Josh Feinberg	28	Waiter	Queens, New York	Day 1	Evicted; Day 41
Eric Ouellette	27	Firefighter	Milford, Connecticut	Day 1	Evicted; Day 34
Tonya Paoni	35	Retail sales specialist	Las Vegas, Nevada	Day 1	Evicted; Day 20
Lori Olson	39	Bank representative	Superior, Wisconsin	Day 1	Evicted; Day 13

=== Future appearances ===
Danielle Reyes and Marcellas Reynolds returned for Big Brother: All Stars. Lisa Donahue was also a candidate for All Stars, but was not selected. Josh Feinberg made a brief appearance on All Stars for a Head of Household competition. Amy Crews returned for Big Brother 10 to host a food competition along with other Big Brother alumni. Danielle Reyes also made a brief appearance on Big Brother 11 to share her thoughts on the season. Reyes as well as Donahue made a brief cameo on the premiere of Big Brother 20, where they were both seen in the audience. Reyes also made brief appearances during the premiere and finale episodes of Big Brother 25. Reyes also competed on the Christmas spin-off Big Brother Reindeer Games.

In 2025, Danielle Reyes competed on the third season of the Peacock reality TV series The Traitors.

== Summary ==
On Day 1, twelve HouseGuests entered the Big Brother house. That night, they participated in their first food competition, in which they entered the backyard to find a table full of groceries and twelve shopping bags. There were also three trees in the yard, each with two nests on them. HouseGuests were given ninety seconds to fill their bag with groceries, find a partner, and get into a nest with that partner. If they completed the competition, they kept their groceries for the week; the group won. Upon completing the competition, the HouseGuests learned that the last pair remaining in their nest with the groceries would win $3,000 for each week that they both remained in the house, giving them a potential total of $30,000. The week that one of them was evicted, the prize would stop growing. The competition lasted more than four and a half hours, with Jason and Lori winning. On Day 2, HouseGuests competed in the "Wheel of First Impressions" Head of Household competition, in which HouseGuests were given a stack of cards with descriptions on them and a wheel with the HouseGuests’ names on it. One at a time, a HouseGuest would take a card and state which HouseGuest they felt the card best described; they would then take another card and do the same. The wheel would then be spun, and the HouseGuest whose name the wheel landed on had to eliminate one of the two selected HouseGuests. When only two HouseGuests remained, the eliminated players would vote for which of the two they would like to see win Head of Household. Lisa won.

On Day 3, the HouseGuests learned that they must compete for the right to use the hot tub in the backyard. They put on bathing suits provided by Big Brother, which featured a blue top and red bottoms. The HouseGuests split into three groups of four, each with two men and two women. A group must jump into a pool and swap their suits with a member of the opposite sex to ensure that they had the same color of suit, meaning that upon exiting the male team members should have on a female's top and bottom of matching color, and women should have a matching male's top and bottom. Each group must do the same task, and all three groups must finish within six minutes. The HouseGuests completed the challenge, unlocking the hot tub. On Day 4, Lori and Marcellas were nominated for eviction, with Marcellas being the target. HouseGuests competed in the "Eggs Over Easy" food competition, in which the men and women threw eggs to each other over a divide. Each egg had a food written on it, and the eggs that did not break were foods that were given to the house. On Day 7, HouseGuests competed in the "Saving Face" Power of Veto competition, in which HouseGuests shot a set of three balls at a cutout representing one HouseGuest. When a HouseGuests cutout got three balls in it, that HouseGuest was eliminated. Gerry won the Power of Veto. HouseGuests competed in the "Luau Luxury" competition, in which they split into two teams and were required to figure out which five items were missing from the house. The winning team earned a dinner, while the losing team had to watch them eat it. Gerry removed Marcellas from the block, as he felt he had been nominated for "racist and homophobic" reasons; Amy was the replacement nominee. On Day 13, Lori became the first evicted HouseGuest in a vote of five to four.

Following Lori's eviction, HouseGuests participated in the "In the House" Head of Household competition, in which they were asked questions regarding in which room a certain item in the house was located. They provided answers by picking up an item that symbolized a room in the house. Marcellas was the winner of the competition. On Day 14, HouseGuests competed in the "Architectural Digestion" food competition. Before the competition began, HouseGuests split into two teams of five and weighed themselves. They then had to eat a giant brownie house without using their hands, and the team who gained the most weight won. Josh was disqualified for using his hands; his team still won. Danielle, Tonya, Eric, Gerry, and Chiara were on the peanut butter and jelly diet for the week. That night, Marcellas nominated Josh and Tonya for eviction, stating that he had nominated Josh for personal reasons and that Tonya was a pawn. The Power of Veto competition this week was the "An Offer You Can't Refuse" competition. Each HouseGuest started the game with one box and would make deals with one another in an attempt to get their box. When the competition is over, the HouseGuests will open their boxes. The HouseGuest who has the box with the Power of Veto in it would win the power. Danielle won. That week, the America's Vote was for HouseGuests to participate in a competition pertaining to bowling. HouseGuests had to both roll a ball with a HouseGuest in it, as well as be rolled while in the ball. They got a point for each pin they knocked over, and the HouseGuest with the most points won. Danielle won and chose which exercise equipment was added to the house; she chose a silent elliptical trainer. During the Power of Veto ceremony, Danielle left the nominations intact, meaning either Josh or Tonya would be evicted. On Day 20, Tonya became the second evicted HouseGuest in a vote of five to three.

Following Tonya's eviction, HouseGuests competed in the "One Step Beyond" Head of Household competition. The blindfolded HouseGuests were asked eight true-or-false questions. If they believed the answer to a question was true, they would raise their paddle and would do nothing if they believed the answer was false. The first HouseGuest to reach the end of their rope would win the competition, and if no HouseGuests completed this, then they would be asked a tie-breaker question. Roddy won during the tie-breaker round. On Day 21, HouseGuests competed in the "Gastronomic Batik" food competition, in which they placed over-sized game chips into a glass container. Each game piece featured a certain type of food. The food types that the HouseGuests fit into the container were the foods they earned that week. They also won a mystery prize, which turned out to be a supply of Subway sandwiches for the week. That day, Roddy nominated Amy and Marcellas for eviction, stating that Amy was his main target. Following this, the two friends debated walking from the game, but after talking in the Diary Room they were convinced to stay. This week, America was asked to select one HouseGuest to earn a dinner in the Diary Room along with a guest of their choice; Marcellas was selected, and he took Amy with him. This week's Power of Veto competition was known as "Pool Sharks." In this competition, HouseGuests played an over-sized version of pool, in which they knocked balls with the face of a HouseGuest on them into the pool, thus eliminating that HouseGuest from the competition. Eric won the Power of Veto competition. He later chose to leave Amy and Marcellas on the block. On Day 27, Amy became the third HouseGuest to be evicted seven to zero.

Following Amy's eviction, HouseGuests competed in the "Face Off" Head of Household competition. HouseGuests were asked questions pertaining to the evicted HouseGuests and Roddy, the outgoing Head of Household. The HouseGuests were given paddles with the face of each of these HouseGuests on them, and one paddle that stood for "none of the above." The HouseGuests answered the questions by holding up the paddle with the name of the HouseGuest they believe was the correct answer. If a HouseGuest was incorrect, they were eliminated from the game, and the last HouseGuest standing was the winner. Gerry won, beating Eric in a tie-breaker. On Day 28, HouseGuests competed in the "I Can Eat Anything Better Than You" food competition. For this, HouseGuests split into two teams of four and faced off with a member of the other team. They were given a specific amount of time to eat a certain food and must wager how many bites they can take of the meal in the given time. If they were successful, they earned their team a point, and would give the other team a point if unsuccessful. Ultimately, Chiara, Roddy, Josh, and Danielle were on the peanut butter and jelly diet this week. That day, Gerry nominated Eric and Lisa for eviction. The HouseGuests later competed in the "Turnover" Power of Veto competition. HouseGuests stood on a square on the board, and would take turns taking one step to another square. Once a square had been stepped on, it was flipped over, thus removing it from the game. When a HouseGuest could make no more moves, they were eliminated. Chiara won. This week, America voted for Jason to receive a letter from home. Chiara left the nominations intact, ensuring either Eric or Lisa's eviction. On Day 34, the vote came down to a tie, with both Eric and Lisa receiving three eviction votes. Gerry cast the deciding vote to evict Eric from the house. That night, the viewers learned Lori, Tonya, and Amy were separately sequestered outside of the country and that one of the four evicted HouseGuests would return to the house following the next eviction.

Following Eric's eviction, HouseGuests competed in the bowling-themed "Gutter Ball" Head of Household competition. For this competition, the HouseGuests had to take a ball and roll it down a runway in an attempt to get their ball closest to the end. If a HouseGuest’s ball went off the runway, they were eliminated. Chiara won. On Day 35, HouseGuests competed in the "Ballast" food competition, in which they found a large circle filled with logs and would take logs out one at a time. Each log had a specific food item on it, and each item they pulled from the pile without collapsing the other logs in the process would be food that the HouseGuests earned for the week. That same day, Josh and Roddy were nominated for eviction. This week's Power of Veto competition was known as "Clockwork." In this competition, HouseGuests were shown snapshots of previous events in the house, and HouseGuests must list the events in order of which they occurred in the house. There were two rounds to the competition, and HouseGuests had to get a perfect score to advance to the second round and ultimately win. Lisa won, giving her her first PoV win. For the America's Vote this week, America rewarded the HouseGuests with a microwave. Lisa left the nominations intact. On Day 41, Josh became the fifth evicted HouseGuest by a vote of five to zero. Following this, it was revealed that the four previously evicted HouseGuests had been asked questions about how much they would be willing to give up to re-enter the house. Lori and Tonya failed to give up as much as Amy and Eric, thus were eliminated. (Amy and Eric said they would give up half of the grand-prize money should they win and go on the PB&J diet for the remaining 42 days, but they were not required to do so.) It was then revealed that the HouseGuests would vote for either Amy or Eric to return to the house. The HouseGuests chose Amy in a vote of five to two.

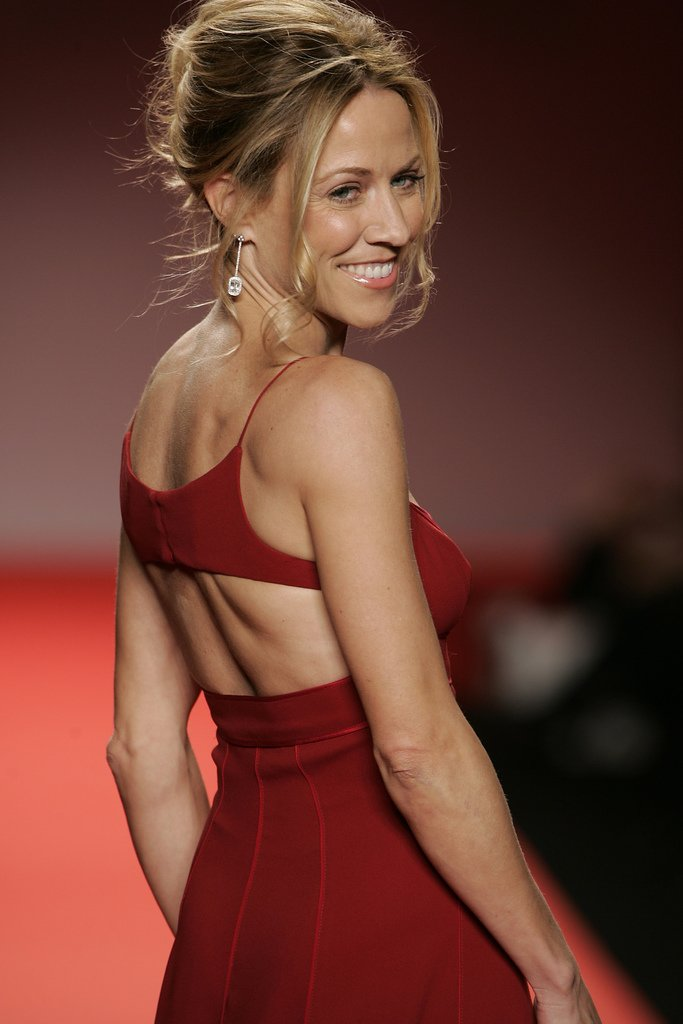
Sheryl Crow entered the house as a guest on Day 42.

Following Josh's eviction and Amy's return, the HouseGuests competed in the "HouseGuest Soup" endurance competition. During the competition, HouseGuests sat in a large bathtub filled with dirty water. They could not stand, get out of the tub, or sleep, otherwise they would be eliminated. Chiara, as the outgoing Head of Household, would dump buckets filled with items such as dead squids into the pool. Amy won. On Day 42, HouseGuests participated in the "Whirlwind Booth" food competition. For this, HouseGuests would one at a time get in a booth, and numerous dollars would swirl around them. The white dollars represented money for food, while the green represented actual money for the HouseGuests to keep. The HouseGuests decided to give all of their money to Gerry, as his wedding anniversary was coming up. The HouseGuests were given a luxury competition, in which they had to find CD cases throughout the house and combine them to form a message. They were successful and were rewarded with a concert by singer Sheryl Crow in the backyard. Amy later chose to nominate Chiara and Roddy for eviction. The Power of Veto competition this week was the "Slippery Proposition" competition. HouseGuests put on their bathing suits and slid on their stomach in an attempt to be the closest one to a line at the end. If a HouseGuest went over the line, they were eliminated. Gerry won, making him the first person to win two Power of Veto competitions. He left Chiara and Roddy on the block. On Day 48, Chiara became the sixth HouseGuest to be evicted from the house in a four to one vote.

Following Chiara's eviction, HouseGuests competed in the "Who Said It?" Head of Household competition. In this competition, the HouseGuests were given cubes with the faces of the five evicted HouseGuests, and one space that stood for "none of the above." Host Julie Chen gave the HouseGuests quotes made by the evicted HouseGuests, and they had to determine who made the comment. The last HouseGuest standing without getting a question wrong was the winner. Ultimately, Jason was the winner of the competition. On Day 49, HouseGuests participated in the "Making the Donuts" food competition, in which HouseGuests had seven minutes to participate in a relay and get sixteen donuts across the backyard. One of the donuts featured a special prize, later revealed to be a supply of coffee and Dunkin' Donuts for the week. The HouseGuests earned some food for the week, but did win the special prize. That same day, Jason chose to nominate Amy and Gerry for eviction. The Power of Veto competition this week was known as "Gnome Drop," and involved gnomes that the HouseGuests had painted earlier in the week. The gnomes were suspended in the air with three lines attached to it. Each line corresponded to an answer to a multiple choice question. One at a time, HouseGuests answered questions by cutting the rope off of a HouseGuests gnome. If they were correct, then that HouseGuests gnome would fall, and eliminate them from the game. Jason was the winner of the competition. The America's Vote this week allowed one HouseGuest to receive a video message from home; Danielle was selected. Jason later chose to leave his nominations the same, meaning either Amy or Gerry would be evicted from the house. On Day 55, Gerry became the seventh HouseGuest evicted from the house in a four to zero vote.

Following Gerry's eviction, HouseGuests participated in the "Evicted Statements" Head of Household competition. The competing HouseGuests were asked true or false questions based on statements that the previously evicted HouseGuests had made. They would hold up one paddle for true and the other paddle for false. Marcellas won, making him the first person this season to win the title of Head of Household twice. On Day 56, HouseGuests participated in the "Sweet Surprise" food competition. For this, HouseGuests had ninety seconds to locate seven medallions in the recently closed off bedroom, with the medallions being placed in pies. Each medallion stood for a day of the week, and any medallion not found resulted in the HouseGuests not receiving food that day. They found all seven medallions, thus earning food for the week. That same day, Marcellas nominated Amy and Roddy for eviction. This week's Power of Veto competition, "Big Brother Charm School," required the HouseGuests to complete an obstacle course in the backyard while balancing a Veto on their head. They were given a fifteen-second penalty for touching or dropping their Veto. The HouseGuests who came in first and second place would receive a massage. Amy won the Power of Veto, and she and Jason won the massages. The America's Vote this week saw the public choosing to give the HouseGuests a shopping spree for clothing, and were only given ninety seconds to do so; they could only keep the clothes that they managed to fit on their body. On Day 62, Roddy was evicted from the house in a unanimous vote of three to zero.

The Golden Power of Veto debuted as the final Power of Veto of the season.

Following Roddy's eviction, HouseGuests competed in the "Freezeframe" Head of Household competition. HouseGuests were shown clips of previous events in the living room and had to state what happened next. They were given three options, one of which was the correct answer. The last HouseGuest remaining without missing a question was the new Head of Household. Jason won after two questions, making it the second time he held the title. On Day 63, the HouseGuests learned of the Golden Power of Veto, in which a nominee could save themselves using the power. This week's food competition, "Dinner Party From Hell," saw the HouseGuests eating plates of disgusting food in the backyard. The HouseGuests failed and had to eat peanut butter and jelly for the week. Jason later nominated Amy and Marcellas for eviction this week. HouseGuests later competed in the "Laser Labyrinth" Golden Power of Veto competition. One at a time, HouseGuests came to the backyard to find that there was a floor with eight rows and three faces in each row. There were also numerous lasers shooting across the backyard, and HouseGuests had to avoid them. The HouseGuest who made it across the floor while stepping on the space of the HouseGuest evicted from each week would win the Power of Veto. Marcellas won the final Power of Veto. On Day 69, he decided not to use the Power of Veto, leaving himself and Amy on the block. The HouseGuests then cast their eviction votes live, with the vote coming to a tie. Jason then cast the deciding vote in favor of evicting Marcellas.

Following Marcellas's eviction, HouseGuests competed in the "...And Then There Were Four" Head of Household competition. For this competition, the HouseGuests were asked questions about the remaining four HouseGuests in the game. They would be asked questions and had to pick a number from zero to four that they felt was the correct answer. The HouseGuest with the most points would be the winner. Danielle won. HouseGuests were later given a luxury competition, in which four cell phones were placed in different rooms of the house. HouseGuests had two minutes to find one of the phones, which everyone did. They learned they would be given a three-minute phone call, as well as $2,000 to send to a loved one. HouseGuests were called to the Diary Room one at a time and were offered $5,000 in addition to the phone call and gift. Taking this prize would result in the other HouseGuests getting nothing. If a HouseGuest declined, then the prize would be increased by $5,000. If more than one HouseGuest accepted the offer, the winner would be determined by a number placed on the phone that they found. Danielle accepted at $5,000, Amy accepted at $10,000, and Jason accepted at $15,000. Amy's phone had the lowest number, so she won the prize. HouseGuests later participated in a food competition titled "Squeeze Play" which required them to soak up water and transfer it to pools while wearing a sponge suit. On Day 70, Danielle nominated Amy and Lisa for eviction. Due to the fact that there was no Power of Veto this week, it assured Jason a spot in the final three. HouseGuests later participated in the "Surf's Up" luxury competition, in which they attempted to stay on a surfboard for the longest time. Amy and Jason won, and won the right to temporarily leave the house and go on a cruise. On Day 76, Jason cast the sole vote to evict Amy from the house.

Following Amy's eviction, the HouseGuests began competing in the first round of the final Head of Household competition. Due to the fact that it is the final HoH, all three HouseGuests are eligible to win. The first round, known as "HoH Lifeboat," saw the HouseGuests sitting in a lifeboat in the pool. In the middle with them was the nomination box, and the HouseGuests were required to hold to their key without letting go. The HouseGuest who hangs on the longest is the winner and advances to the third and final round. Lisa won. On Day 77, Danielle and Jason competed in the "Household Chores" competition. Jason won, meaning he and Lisa would face off in the final round. On Day 78, Lisa and Jason competed in the live "Jury Statements" competition, in which they had to complete statements made by the previously evicted HouseGuests based on how they believed the evictees had answered. Lisa won, becoming the final Head of Household. She then cast the sole vote to evict Jason from the house, making her and Danielle the Final Two. On Day 82, the jury voted to reward Lisa with the $500,000 grand prize in a vote of nine to one with Danielle only receiving the vote of Jason.

== Episodes ==
No. overall	No. in season	Title	Original release date	U.S. viewers (millions)
101	1	"Episode 1"	July 10, 2002	9.19
102	2	"Episode 2"	July 11, 2002	7.59
103	3	"Episode 3"	July 13, 2002	5.32
104	4	"Episode 4"	July 17, 2002	8.93
105	5	"Episode 5"	July 18, 2002	7.85
106	6	"Episode 6"	July 20, 2002	5.66
107	7	"Episode 7"	July 24, 2002	10.21
108	8	"Episode 8"	July 25, 2002	9.04
109	9	"Episode 9"	July 27, 2002	5.98
110	10	"Episode 10"	July 31, 2002	9.99
111	11	"Episode 11"	August 1, 2002	8.62
112	12	"Episode 12"	August 3, 2002	6.34
113	13	"Episode 13"	August 7, 2002	8.68
114	14	"Episode 14"	August 8, 2002	8.64
115	15	"Episode 15"	August 10, 2002	6.44
116	16	"Episode 16"	August 14, 2002	10.58
117	17	"Episode 17"	August 15, 2002	9.69
118	18	"Episode 18"	August 16, 2002	8.49
119	19	"Episode 19"	August 21, 2002	10.24
120	20	"Episode 20"	August 22, 2002	9.64
121	21	"Episode 21"	August 24, 2002	5.69
122	22	"Episode 22"	August 28, 2002	9.23
123	23	"Episode 23"	August 29, 2002	8.44
124	24	"Episode 24"	August 31, 2002	6.32
125	25	"Episode 25"	September 4, 2002	9.20
126	26	"Episode 26"	September 5, 2002	9.79
127	27	"Episode 27"	September 12, 2002	10.62
128	28	"Episode 28"	September 14, 2002	7.34
129	29	"Episode 29"	September 18, 2002	9.40
130	30	"Episode 30"	September 19, 2002	14.57
131	31	"Episode 31"	September 21, 2002	7.93
132	32	"Episode 32"	September 25, 2002	12.94
133	33	"Episode 33"	September 25, 2002	12.94

== Voting history ==
Color key:

Winner
Runner-up
Head of Household
Nominated for eviction
Evicted
Re-entered the game

Voting history (season 3)
	Week 1	Week 2	Week 3	Week 4	Week 5		Week 6	Week 7	Week 8	Week 9	Week 10	Week 11	
	Week 1	Week 2	Week 3	Week 4	Eviction	Voteback	Week 6	Week 7	Week 8	Week 9	Week 10	Day 78	Finale
Head of Household	Lisa	Marcellas	Roddy	Gerry	Chiara	(None)	Amy	Jason	Marcellas	Jason	Danielle	Lisa	(None)
Nominations (initial)	Lori; Marcellas	Josh; Tonya	Amy; Marcellas	Eric; Lisa	Josh; Roddy	(None)	Chiara; Roddy	Amy; Gerry	Amy; Roddy	Amy; Marcellas	(None)		(None)
Veto winner	Gerry	Danielle	Eric	Chiara	Lisa	(None)	Gerry	Jason	Amy	Marcellas (Note: The final Power of Veto competition was for the Golden Power of Veto, which allowed a nominee to veto their own nomination. Marcellas won the Golden Power of Veto, but chose not to use it.)	(None)		(None)
Nominations (final)	Amy; Lori	Josh; Tonya	Amy; Marcellas	Eric; Lisa	Josh; Roddy	Amy; Eric	Chiara; Roddy	Amy; Gerry	Amy; Roddy	Amy; Marcellas	Amy; Lisa	Danielle; Jason	(None)
Lisa	Head of Household	Josh	Amy	Nominated	Josh	Amy	Chiara	Gerry	Roddy	Amy	Nominated	Jason (Note: As Head of Household, Lisa chose to evict Jason.)	Winner
Danielle	Amy	Tonya	Amy	Eric	Josh	Amy	Roddy	Gerry	Roddy	Marcellas	Head of Household	Nominated	Runner-up
Jason	Amy	Tonya	Amy	Eric	Josh	Amy	Chiara	Head of Household	Roddy	Marcellas (Note: As the vote was tied, the Head of Household cast the tie-breaker vote.)	Amy	Evicted (Day 78)	Danielle
Amy	Nominated	Tonya	Nominated	Evicted (Day 27)			Head of Household	Nominated	Nominated	Nominated	Nominated	Re-evicted (Day 76)	Lisa
Marcellas	Lori	Head of Household	Nominated	Eric	Josh	Amy	Chiara	Gerry	Head of Household	Nominated	Evicted (Day 69)		Lisa
Roddy	Lori	Tonya	Head of Household	Lisa	Nominated	Eric	Nominated	Gerry	Nominated	Evicted (Day 62)			Lisa
Gerry	Amy	Josh	Amy	Eric	Josh	Amy	Chiara	Nominated	Evicted (Day 55)				Lisa
Chiara	Lori	Josh	Amy	Lisa	Head of Household	Eric	Nominated	Evicted (Day 48)					Lisa
Josh	Amy	Nominated	Amy	Lisa	Nominated	Evicted (Day 41)							Lisa
Eric	Lori	Tonya	Amy	Nominated	Evicted (Day 34)								Lisa
Tonya	Lori	Nominated	Evicted (Day 20)										Lisa
Lori	Nominated	Evicted (Day 13)											Lisa
Evicted	Lori; 5 of 9 votes to evict	Tonya; 5 of 8 votes to evict	Amy; 7 of 7 votes to evict	Eric; 4 of 7 votes to evict	Josh; 5 of 5 votes to evict	Amy; 5 of 7 votes to return (Note: Lori, Tonya, Amy, and Eric competed in a challenge to re-enter the house. The two winners of the challenge faced a vote by the remaining HouseGuests to determine who would return. Amy and Eric won the challenge, and Amy was voted back into the house.)	Chiara; 4 of 5 votes to evict	Gerry; 4 of 4 votes to evict	Roddy; 3 of 3 votes to evict	Marcellas; 2 of 3 votes to evict	Amy; Jason's choice to evict	Jason; Lisa's choice to evict	Lisa; 9 votes to win
Evicted	Lori; 5 of 9 votes to evict	Tonya; 5 of 8 votes to evict	Amy; 7 of 7 votes to evict	Eric; 4 of 7 votes to evict	Josh; 5 of 5 votes to evict	Amy; 5 of 7 votes to return	Chiara; 4 of 5 votes to evict	Gerry; 4 of 4 votes to evict	Roddy; 3 of 3 votes to evict	Marcellas; 2 of 3 votes to evict	Amy; Jason's choice to evict	Jason; Lisa's choice to evict	Danielle; 1 vote to win

== Development ==
Talk of a new installment to the series shortly following the conclusion of Big Brother 2 (2001), when CBS chief Les Moonves was quoted as stating he was "happy" with the success of Big Brother and similar reality shows on the network. The third season was officially announced in early 2002, along with plans for a celebrity edition of the series. Arnold Shapiro returned to produce the series, and claimed that production would be much more strict on the HouseGuests; among these new rules, Shapiro stated that HouseGuests who read banners flown above the house could face expulsion. Shapiro later called the series "socially intriguing", commenting "I could say: ‘I’m going to be me. I’m going to be my ethical, honest, low-key self.’ But who knows, after six and seven weeks of having been betrayed by somebody and [having] plots hatched against me and being deprived of food except for peanut butter and jelly? I might become a villain." Allison Grodner also returned as the executive producer to the series. It was revealed before the premiere that numerous changes to the series would occur before its premiere, though these changes were not specified. Allison Grodner later stated "[We] have thrown in just a few twists and turns, just a few new roadblocks in terms of our rules and format so that the people coming into the house who have worked out a perfect strategy—and believe me, all of them think they have—are in for a few surprises."

It was confirmed in May that the series would premiere on July 10. The season aired on Wednesdays, Thursdays, and Saturdays on CBS, with the live eviction episodes occurring on Thursdays. When asked about the authenticity of the story-lines used in the episodes, Shaprio claimed "We're sticklers for maintaining the purity we do have in terms of how little we interfere with the lives of the 12 people in our house. Once they go in, we don't touch 'em. How they behave is entirely up to them." This was the second season that required viewers to pay for the live feeds, which were $9.95 per month following a free two-week trial; the feeds were yet again available through RealPlayer. The feeds launched following the premiere episode, with the first few days in the house not being aired. Along with the television series, CBS announced a fantasy game in which players would make a team of HouseGuests and earn points when a member of their time did certain things in the game.

On April 25, Julie Chen confirmed that she would return as host for the series. Casting for the season began in April 2002. Due to controversies surrounding the second season, this round of applications involved more in depth questions about previous arrests or legal troubles. Following the incident that resulted in the expulsion of Justin Sebik the prior year, Arnold Shapiro stated "We're as certain as humanly possible, certain as we can be, that we've got 12 people who understand that the threat of violence, or violence itself, zero tolerance." Thom Bierdz, a cast member of the soap opera The Young and the Restless and Rob Cesternino, who would later appear on Survivor: The Amazon were among the over 5,000 applicants for Big Brother 3. The twelve competing HouseGuests were set to be revealed on July 5, five days before the series premiered. Despite this, Entertainment Weekly leaked the cast the day prior. The HouseGuests entered the house on July 6. On the new cast, Shapiro stated "I don’t want to insult last year’s [cast], but this group is gonna make bathing-suit time worth watching [...] we have some hot single moms [and a gay man who is] not hairy like Bunky." He later elaborated, stating "I would say, speaking of eye candy, I would say everybody's sweet tooth in America will be more than satiated." This season featured a total of six men and six women. Gerry Lancaster was the oldest housemate this season, and was a middle school teacher. Marcellas Reynolds was openly gay, while four HouseGuests this season had children.

=== House ===
The house used for the third season was a one story house with four bedrooms, a kitchen and dining room, and one bathroom. It was the same house used for the prior season, which was an estimated 2,400 feet. The lot used for the house was located at the CBS Studio Center in Hollywood. During their stay in the house, the HouseGuests were required to wear microphones at all times, ensuring everything they said in the house was heard. Throughout the house there are two way mirrors lined against the walls, with a production team filming behind them. The bedrooms featured infrared night vision cameras, allowing the cameras to continue filming while the lights were off. The house was re-decorated from the previous season, and featured a "modern Asian influenced" look. The kitchen yet again featured the round table used last year, and featured a camera in the center. The couches in the living room were a light green, while the chairs for the nominees were a bright purple; a fireplace was placed behind these chairs. The bright purple was used throughout the house in the walls and furniture. The "reptile room" featured two bearded dragons in a cage, and required four HouseGuests to sleep in three beds. There was also a beach-themed room with bright blue walls and palm trees. The adjoining room, separated only by a plexi-glass wall, featured only four cots for the HouseGuests to sleep on. One of the cots was made of bamboo, and the room had a brown and light green color scheme. The fourth bedroom is the Head of Household room. The HoH for the week has this room, which features perks such as privacy, laundry service, and pictures from home. The backyard featured a patio area for the HouseGuests to sit, as well as a pool, jacuzzi, and basketball court. The Diary Room featured a light green chair, along with the bright purple walls on display throughout the house.

== Reception ==
=== Ratings ===
Big Brother 3 saw an increase in ratings, averaging 8.70 million viewers throughout the season. The season premiered to an audience of 9.2 million viewers, topping shows such as American Idol and claiming the top spot for the night. The two tied in terms of adult viewers under 50, but American Idol later topped Big Brother 3 in terms of viewers between the ages of 18 and 34. The series continued to have ratings success. Tonya's eviction episode placed first in viewers for the night, with 9.04 million viewers. The August 14 episode of the season garnered 10.58 million viewers, making it the highest viewership the season had earned at the time. This was an increase from the August 7 episode, which had a total of 9.91 million viewers. The August 22 episode of the series saw 9.64 million viewers, and made it the highest rated Thursday episode of the season at that point. The August 24 episode – a recap episode in which an endurance competition also occurred – had a total of 5.69 million viewers. The August 25 episode, which featured Sheryl Crow making a guest appearance to perform for the HouseGuests, earned the series its best ratings in the age 18–49 demographic, and had a total of 10.24 million viewers. Big Brother 3 later won all three of its time periods in viewers, households and most key demographics from the week ending September 1, 2002. The September 5 episode of the season, which saw Roddy being evicted from the house, had 9.79 million viewers, making it the highest rated Thursday slot for the season at the time. The online game introduced this season proved to be a success, garnering more than 80,000 players throughout the course of the season.

=== Public reaction ===
Big Brother 3 saw controversy during the game, much like the previous two editions. Before entering the house, HouseGuest Chiara Berti was arrested by California Highway Patrol officers that May. She spent about five hours in custody at the Van Nuys jail before being released on bail. That June, Chiara was formally charged with three misdemeanors: driving under the influence, driving with a blood alcohol content above California's 0.08% limit, and driving without a license. This made it the second season in a row where HouseGuests with criminal records were present, a controversial event that had occurred the previous year. CBS stated that they were aware of Chiara's record before selecting her to enter the house and later stated they may let her temporarily leave the house for the hearing. Chiara's lawyer later stated that he would be able to appear on her behalf during her time on the show, including at her September 3, 2002, hearing. Chiara was evicted before the hearing and was able to appear on her own behalf. It was later revealed that HouseGuest Amy Crews had a similar background and was arrested for the same crime in 1999. HouseGuest Tonya Paoni was also due in court in late August but was evicted from the show before the hearing and was able to attend. More controversy surrounded Amy's return to the game after she was evicted. Before her return, the remaining HouseGuests came up with a plan, known as "Operation Revolving Door," in which they would evict Amy the same week that she returned to the house. HouseGuests such as Chiara later speculated that Amy had been warned about the plan before entering the house and had been told by producers to win the Head of Household competition. Amy was apparently told that it was "in her best interest" to win the Head of Household competition upon her return. CBS later denied these statements, stating they had not informed Amy of any events in the game. Amy later stated that she had been able to talk to some fans of the series following her eviction, which is in violation of the rules of the game.

Big Brother 3 had a huge impact on the dynamics of the Big Brother game and influenced numerous future seasons. This was the first season to introduce the Power of Veto competition, an addition to the format that remained for all subsequent seasons, though this was the only season when the Veto winner was not allowed to use it to take themselves out of voting consideration if they were on the block (the Golden Veto, where the winner could use it on themselves or anyone else, became the template that has been used since then). Though the Silver Power of Veto did not appear in future seasons, the Golden Veto was adopted by the show. Big Brother 3 was also the first season to feature a theme for a twist when it introduced the "Expect the Unexpected" theme of the season. Following this edition, all future seasons included a twist that impacted the game. The term "expect the unexpected" later became an infamous Big Brother phrase and was used in numerous editions afterwards. Big Brother 3 is seen as one of the biggest influences in terms of the creation of the sequestered jury, in which the last seven (or in some seasons nine) evicted HouseGuests from each season are sequestered outside of the house until after the finale. This addition to the format came after much controversy surrounding Lisa's win this season. In Big Brother 3, HouseGuests returned home and could watch the show in its entirety after their evictions. This led to the HouseGuests seeing all of Danielle's Diary Room sessions in which she spoke very poorly of them and gloated about how she lied to their faces and betrayed them. This is often credited as the main reason that Danielle lost to Lisa, and since this season evicted contestants have not been able to watch footage between their booting and their return to serve on the final jury. When asked about the final vote, Danielle stated, "I believe during the final vote they forgot it wasn't a game about ethics. It should be about who played the game the best." Despite this, many feel that Lisa deserved the win.
