= Big Brother 7 (American season) =

Big Brother: All-Stars
- Season 7
- Big Brother 7 logo
- Hosted by: Julie Chen
- No. of days: 72
- No. of houseguests: 14
- Winner: Mike "Boogie" Malin
- Runner-up: Erika Landin
- America's Favorite Juror: Janelle Pierzina
- Companion show: House Calls
- No. of episodes: 28

Release
- Original network: CBS
- Original release: July 6 – September 12, 2006

Additional information
- Filming dates: July 3 – September 12, 2006

Season chronology
- ← Previous; Season 6 Next → Season 8

Big Brother 7, also known as Big Brother: All-Stars, is the seventh season of the American reality television series Big Brother. The season premiered on CBS on July 6, 2006, and lasted eleven weeks until the live finale on September 12, 2006. The seventh season saw a moderate increase in ratings, though they generally remained the same when compared to previous editions. The season premiered to a total of 7.69 million viewers, the lowest premiere numbers for any season at the time. The season finale had a total of 8.14 million viewers. In total, the series averaged 7.56 million viewers. Big Brother: All-Stars featured a total of 14 HouseGuests, the same number that was featured in the previous season. The majority of the cast was selected by viewers, though producers did select some HouseGuests; it is composed entirely of HouseGuests from the first six seasons. The series ended after 72 days, in which HouseGuest Mike "Boogie" Malin was crowned the Winner, and Erika Landin the Runner-up.

== Format ==
The format remains largely unchanged from previous seasons. HouseGuests are sequestered in the Big Brother House with no contact to or from the outside world. Each week, the HouseGuests take part in several compulsory challenges that determine who will win food, luxuries, and power in the House. The winner of the weekly Head of Household competition is immune from nominations and must nominate two fellow HouseGuests for eviction. After a HouseGuest becomes Head of Household, he or she is ineligible to take part in the next Head of Household competition. HouseGuests also take part in competitions to earn food for the week. The losing team will be forced to eat Big Brother Slop for the week. This was the first season to feature Slop as the punishment food, as it was originally peanut butter and jelly. The winner of the Power of Veto competition wins the right to save one of the nominated HouseGuests from eviction. If the Veto winner exercises the power, the Head of Household must then nominate another HouseGuest for eviction.

On eviction night, all HouseGuests except for the Head of Household and the two nominees vote to evict one of the two nominees. This compulsory vote is conducted in the privacy of the Diary Room by the host Julie Chen. In the event of a tie, the Head of Household must cast the deciding vote, announcing it in front of the other HouseGuests. Unlike other versions of Big Brother, the HouseGuests may discuss the nomination and eviction process openly and freely. The nominee with the greater number of votes will be evicted from the House on the live Thursday broadcast, exiting to an adjacent studio to be interviewed by Chen. HouseGuests may voluntarily leave the House at any time and those who break the rules may be expelled from the house by Big Brother. The final seven HouseGuests evicted during the season will vote for the winner on the season finale. These "Jury Members" will be sequestered in a separate house and will not be allowed to watch the show except for competitions and ceremonies that include all of the remaining HouseGuests. The jury members will not be shown any Diary Room interviews or any footage that include strategy or details regarding nominations.

Though the majority of the format stayed the same for Big Brother: All Stars, there were some differences from previous seasons. One of the main changes was the departure of the peanut butter and jelly diet that had been used since Big Brother 2. In its place, the contestants who lost the food competition would be required to eat Big Brother Slop for the week, which has an oatmeal like texture to it. Big Brother Slop has been used in all subsequent seasons following its debut. Additionally, the player selection for the Power of Veto competition changed from the Head of Household and the two nominees being able to choose anyone they wanted to compete to a random draw occurring to decide the other three competitors. A third twist occurred in which a new special power was brought into the game. The HouseGuests were given clues to a secret phrase that referenced the game of Big Brother. The first clue was of a sheep, and the second was an oversized needle and thread being found in the house. The final clue was a grim reaper. The correct answer was the phrase "You reap what you sew", and Mike was the first person to correctly guess it in the Diary Room. He therefore won the Coup d'État, giving him the ability to overturn the Head of Household's nominations and replace them with two HouseGuests of his choosing. He could not nominate the reigning Head of Household or the Power of Veto winner during the week he decided to use it. If the power was used, that week's Head of Household would be allowed to compete in the following Head of Household competition. Ultimately, Mike chose not to use the power. The Coup d'État was later brought into the game during Big Brother 11, in which viewers chose one HouseGuest to obtain the power.

== HouseGuests ==
The cast of the seventh season Big Brother: All-Stars. Top: Will, Howie, Janelle, Alison, James, Jase, Diane and Kaysar Bottom: Danielle, George, Nakomis, Mike Boogie, Marcellas and Erika

Twenty potential candidates were revealed on June 21, 2006, on a special telecast on CBS. After the special aired, the public were invited to vote for their favorite former HouseGuest to return to the House. Originally, twelve HouseGuests would have competed: the top three male and female candidates who received the highest number of public votes would become HouseGuests, while the production team chose the remaining six HouseGuests. During the season premiere, Julie Chen revealed that due to the high volume of votes received, there would be fourteen HouseGuests: the top four male and female candidates from the public vote, and six HouseGuests chosen by the producers. The All-Stars in order in groups from their seasons were Mike "Boogie" Malin from Big Brother 2, Will Kirby who won Big Brother 2, Alison Irwin from Big Brother 4, Erika Landin from Big Brother 4, George Boswell from Big Brother 1 (the only HouseGuest from Big Brother 1), Danielle Reyes from Big Brother 3, Marcellas Reynolds from Big Brother 3, Janelle Pierzina from Big Brother 6, James Rhine from Big Brother 6, Kaysar Ridha from Big Brother 6, Howie from Big Brother 6, Diane Henry from Big Brother 5, Jason "Jase" Wirey from Big Brother 5 and Jennifer "Nakomis" Dedmon from Big Brother 5. (The candidates that did not get chosen were Bill "Bunky" Miller from Big Brother 2, Dana Varela from Big Brother 4, Ivette Corredero from Big Brother 6, Lisa Donahue who was the winner of Big Brother 3, Michael "Cowboy" Ellis from Big Brother 5 and Monica Bailey from Big Brother 2).

Name	Age	Hometown	Choice	Result
Mike "Boogie" Malin Big Brother 2	35	Concord, New Hampshire	Production	Winner; Day 72
Erika Landin Big Brother 4	36	Chicago, Illinois	Public	Runner-up; Day 72
Janelle Pierzina Big Brother 6	26	Grand Rapids, Minnesota	Public	Evicted; Day 67
Will Kirby Big Brother 2	33	Miami, Florida	Production	Evicted; Day 65
George Boswell Big Brother 1	47	Rockford, Illinois	Production	Evicted; Day 60
Danielle Reyes Big Brother 3	34	Vacaville, California	Production	Evicted; Day 60
James Rhine Big Brother 6	30	Miami, Florida	Public	Evicted; Day 53
Howie Gordon Big Brother 6	35	Chicago, Illinois	Public	Evicted; Day 47
Marcellas Reynolds Big Brother 3	36	South Shore, Illinois	Production	Evicted; Day 46
Kaysar Ridha Big Brother 6	25	Irvine, California	Public	Evicted; Day 39
Diane Henry Big Brother 5	24	Cincinnati, Ohio	Public	Evicted; Day 32
Jason "Jase" Wirey Big Brother 5	30	Taylorville, Illinois	Public	Evicted; Day 25
Jennifer "Nakomis" Dedmon Big Brother 5	23	San Antonio, Texas	Public	Evicted; Day 18
Alison Irwin Big Brother 4	25	Meadville, Pennsylvania	Production	Evicted; Day 11

=== Candidates ===
Out of the twenty candidates selected to participate in the all stars show, six former HouseGuests were not chosen by the public or the producers to enter the House.

Name	Age	Hometown
Bill "Bunky" Miller Big Brother 2	42	Harrisburg, North Carolina
Dana Varela Big Brother 4	31	Bayside, New York
Ivette Corredero Big Brother 6	26	Miami Beach, Florida
Lisa Donahue Big Brother 3	30	Rochester, New York
Michael "Cowboy" Ellis Big Brother 5	25	Durant, Oklahoma
Monica Bailey Big Brother 2	45	Bedford-Stuyvesant, New York

=== Future appearances ===
Janelle Pierzina and Mike "Boogie" Malin returned for season 14 as coaches guiding the new HouseGuests, later entering to play the game themselves. Janelle and Kaysar Ridha also returned for season 22.

George Boswell, Jason "Jase" Wirey, and Janelle Pierzina returned in season 10 to host a food competition along with other Big Brother alumni. Danielle Reyes also made a brief appearance on season 11 to share her thoughts on the season. Janelle Pierzina also made future appearances on season 8 and season 11. Kaysar returned to host a competition during season 25.

George Boswell, Bill "Bunky" Miller, Danielle Reyes, Lisa Donahue, Erika Landin, Michael "Cowboy" Ellis, and Kaysar Ridha attended the premiere of season 20.

Will Kirby continues to regularly host the jury roundtables, starting with season 15. He also appeared during season 22 in "Neighbour's Week", where he would tempt the HouseGuests with power and prizes. and infomem the viers of the Triple Eviction

Janelle Pierzina and Will Kirby also appeared on a special edition of The Price Is Right, competing with other past Big Brother players. Will emerged as the winner, donating his $51,030 cash prize to charity.

Danielle Reyes competed on the first edition of Big Brother: Reindeer Games, a competition themed holiday spin-off. Despite being the third to be eliminated, she won a $5,000 cash prize.

Outside Big Brother, Janelle Pierzina competed with season 12 HouseGuest Britney Haynes on The Amazing Race 31. She also appeared as a contestant on the USA Network reality competition series, Snake in the Grass. She competed on the second season of The Traitors, in which Will Kirby guest starred. In 2025, Danielle Reyes competed on the third season of the Peacock reality TV series The Traitors.

=== Guests ===
In addition to the All-Star HouseGuests, other HouseGuests from past seasons returned in a guest capacity.

Name	Day	Reason
Nicole Schaffrich Big Brother 2	Day 40	Judged the "Big Brother Bakery" food competition
Nicole Schaffrich Big Brother 2	Day 41	Hosted the "Anything You Can Do, I Can Do Veto" PoV competition
Hardy Ames-Hill Big Brother 2	Day 41	Participated in the "Anything You Can Do, I Can Do Veto" PoV competition
Bunky Miller Big Brother 2	Day 39	Appeared as an image for "The Ghosts of Big Brother Past" HoH competition
Josh Feinberg Big Brother 3	Day 38	Appeared as an image for "The Ghosts of Big Brother Past" HoH competition
Jack Owens Big Brother 4	Day 41	Participated in the "Anything You Can Do, I Can Do Veto" PoV competition
Jun Song Big Brother 4	Day 40	Judged the "Big Brother Bakery" food competition
Marvin Latimer Big Brother 5	Day 40	Judged the "Big Brother Bakery" food competition
Holly King Big Brother 5	Day 38	Appeared as an image for "The Ghosts of Big Brother Past" HoH competition
Scott Long Big Brother 5	Day 41	Participated in the "Anything You Can Do, I Can Do Veto" PoV competition
Eric Littmann Big Brother 6	Day 38	Appeared as an image for "The Ghosts of Big Brother Past" HoH competition
April Lewis Big Brother 6	Day 41	Participated in the "Anything You Can Do, I Can Do Veto" PoV competition

== Summary ==
On Day 1, the fourteen HouseGuests entered the house for a second chance at winning the game. Following their entrance, HouseGuests competed in the "Falling Stars" Head of Household competition. For this competition, HouseGuests competed in two groups. One group, consisting of seven HouseGuests, stood on a spinning platform, while the other group threw an over-sized boulder at them in an attempt to knock them off of the platform. When only one remained on the platform, the groups switched places. The process was then repeated until only one remained from the second group. This competition resulted in two people winning the title of Head of Household, those being the two people not to be knocked off; Janelle and Jase became joint Head of Household. They learned that if they failed to agree on whom to nominate, then they would become the nominees themselves. Due to Janelle's position of power and their large numbers, Howie, James, Janelle, and Kaysar became quick targets for the others. This led Alison and Danielle to come up with a plan to evict Janelle from the house, in which they wanted Jase to disagree with her nominations and thus nominating both himself and Janelle; this would ensure Janelle's eviction. Despite this plan, Jase and the "Season Six" alliance later discussed the plan with one another, and he agreed to help them out in the game. On Day 3, Jase and Janelle chose to nominate Alison and Danielle for eviction. This made it the first time Danielle had been nominated for eviction, as she had never been nominated in her previous season.

Following the nominations, both Janelle and Jase expressed a difference of opinion as to who should be evicted; Jase wanted Danielle to go, while Janelle wanted Alison evicted. When picking players for the Power of Veto competition, the HouseGuests learned of the new twist, in which the three players selected to play would now be randomly selected, as opposed to the Head of Household and nominees deciding. This prevented the backdooring strategy that had been started by Nakomis in her initial season, as all HouseGuests were eligible to compete for the Power of Veto. Kaysar and George were selected to play, while Mike was selected to host. On Day 5, HouseGuests competed in the "One Man's Trash Is Another Man's Veto" Power of Veto competition. For this competition, HouseGuests were required to dig through trash in the backyard taken from the first six seasons of the series, including items from old competitions. Hidden in the garbage were numerous Veto symbols, and the first HouseGuest to find six symbols would be the winner. Janelle was the winner of the competition. On Day 7, Janelle made the decision to leave Alison and Danielle on the block. Mike and Will later began campaigning for Alison to stay, and had convinced Diane and Nakomis to vote the same way. Upon learning that Janelle, as the Veto winner, would break the tie, the two decided against the plan. They failed to tell Diane and Nakomis, however, and they voted in the minority. On Day 11, Alison became the first HouseGuest evicted from the house in a vote of eight to two.

Following Alison's eviction, HouseGuests competed in the "Alison Rules" Head of Household competition. For this competition, the competing HouseGuests were asked a question, while Alison answered the same question with Julie Chen. The HouseGuests had to attempt to answer each question the same way as Alison, and failure to do so resulted in their elimination. Kaysar was the winner of this competition. On Day 12, HouseGuests competed in the "Slop 'Til You Drop" food competition. For this competition, HouseGuests split into two groups of six, with a pair from each team being chained together at the hip. They were required to dig through slop without using their hands in an attempt to find rubber rats. The team who had the most rats at the end of the competition were the winners, while the losing team would be on Big Brother Slop for the week. The team of Danielle, Howie, James, Janelle, Marcellas, and Nakomis lost the competition. That same day, Kaysar chose to nominate Diane and Nakomis for eviction, with Nakomis being his target. In doing so, Kaysar made a deal with Mike and Will for them to take out floaters in the game rather than Kaysar's alliance. When picking players for the Power of Veto competition, Will, Erika, and James were selected to compete; George was selected to host. On Day 13, HouseGuests competed in the "Big Brother Golf Classic" Power of Veto competition. For this competition, HouseGuests had to hit over-sized golf balls in the backyard, and earned a certain number of golf balls depending on where their ball landed in the backyard. There was also a section which would allow a HouseGuest to give someone a ball, thus hindering them. When a HouseGuest received seven golf balls, they were eliminated; the last HouseGuest remaining was the winner. Erika was the winner of the competition. Later, she chose not to use the Power of Veto leaving Diane and Nakomis on the chopping block. On Day 18, Nakomis became the second HouseGuest to be evicted from the house in a vote of eight to two.

Following Nakomis' eviction, HouseGuests competed in the "Pay Attention" Head of Household competition. Prior to the competition, HouseGuests were shown still photos from previous competitions, and the HouseGuests were later quizzed about these images during the competition. James was the winner of the competition. On Day 19, HouseGuests competed in the "Balanced Diet" food competition. For this competition, HouseGuests paired up and were required to maneuver a bowling ball up an incline ramp with holes at the top. If a pair's ball made it to the top of the ramp, the team had won food for the house on that day, as well as a catered meal. If a ball fell on the way to the top, the HouseGuests ate whatever area their ball fell into that day. Four of the pairs managed to earn full food for the week. Later that day, James chose to nominate George and Will for eviction, with George being his main target. When picking players for the Power of Veto, Jase, Mike, and Kaysar were selected compete; Janelle was selected to host. On Day 20, HouseGuests competed in the "How Bad Do You Want It?" Power of Veto competition. For this competition, HouseGuests were required to take punishments in exchange for remaining in the competition; the last HouseGuest remaining was the winner. George was the winner of the competition. Shortly before the Power of Veto ceremony, Jase found out he was a potential replacement nominee and began throwing things around the backyard and engaging in numerous verbal arguments. On Day 22, George chose to use the Power of Veto to remove himself from the block, with Jase being nominated as the replacement nominee. On Day 25, Jase became the third HouseGuest to be evicted from the house in a unanimous vote of nine to zero.

Following Jase's eviction, HouseGuests competed in the "Define & Dismiss" Head of Household competition. For this competition, HouseGuests were asked questions about the quotes and definitions that were hanging as decorations around the house. If a HouseGuest answered correctly, they eliminated someone of the competition; an incorrect answer resulted in their own elimination. Janelle was the winner, making her the first person to have Head of Household twice this season. On Day 26, HouseGuests competed in the "Food Fight" food competition. For this competition, numerous balls fell into the backyard, and HouseGuests attempted to be the first to grab the ball with a star on it. The HouseGuest who grabbed this ball each round would have food privileges for the week, but were required to select one HouseGuest to eliminate from the competition, thus putting them on slop for the week. Ultimately, Marcellas, Will, Diane, and Erika were the losers, thus were on the slop diet for the week. Later that day, Janelle chose to nominate Erika and Mike for eviction, hoping to eliminate a "floater" from the game. On Day 27, HouseGuests competed in the "Torture Test" Power of Veto competition. For this competition, HouseGuests attempted to read Big Brother phrases spelled backwards in an attempt to guess what the correct phrase was. If a HouseGuest answered correctly, they could give a punishment to another HouseGuest, thus hindering their chances at winning. The first HouseGuest to get three phrases correctly would be the winner of the competition; Mike was the winner. Following his win, Mike kicked a pair of glass goggles, believing them to be plastic, and cut his foot open; the wound required stitches, though did not impact the game in any form. On Day 28, HouseGuests competed in the "Pit Stop" luxury competition. For this competition, HouseGuests split into teams and assemble a car in the fastest time. Mike could not compete due to his injury, thus had to select the team he felt would win. The winning team, which consisted of Diane, Janelle, Will, Mike, Danielle, and James were the winners, and won an advanced screening of the film Talladega Nights: The Ballad of Ricky Bobby. On Day 29, Mike chose to use the Power of Veto to remove himself from the block, with Diane being nominated as the replacement nominee. This decision upset numerous HouseGuests, such as Marcellas, Danielle, and James, and led to Danielle, James, Mike, and Will forming the "Legion of Doom" alliance with the hope of evicting Janelle. On Day 32, Diane became the fourth HouseGuest to be evicted from the house in a vote of seven to one.

Following Diane's eviction, HouseGuests competed in the "Caught In a Web" endurance Head of Household competition. For this competition, HouseGuests were required to lay upon a large "spider web" suspended in the air; the goal was to be the last HouseGuest remaining on the web. The first five HouseGuests to fall from the web were able to open an "egg", which could feature a reward or be empty. Danielle was the winner of the competition, making it the first time that someone outside of the "Season Six" alliance won; James won the right to nullify an eviction vote, Mike won $10,000, and Marcellas won a slop pass. Due to the endurance Head of Household competition, there was no food competition this week. On Day 33, Danielle chose to nominate James and Janelle for eviction, with Janelle being her main target. When picking players for the Power of Veto competition, Will, Marcellas, and Mike were selected to play; Erika was selected to host the competition. On Day 34, HouseGuests competed in the "Grave Mistakes" Power of Veto competition. For this competition, HouseGuests were placed in personal graves and were offered luxuries and punishments; they would gain points for each punishment they took, and lost points for each luxury they took. The HouseGuest with the most points at the end of the competition was the winner; Janelle was the winner of the Power of Veto. On Day 36, Janelle chose to use the Power of Veto to remove herself from the block, with Kaysar being nominated in her place. For this week's eviction, James chose to use the power he had earned during the Head of Household competition and nullified Janelle's vote. On Day 39, Kaysar became the fifth HouseGuest to be evicted from the house in a vote of five to one.

Following Kaysar's eviction, HouseGuests competed in "The Ghost of Big Brother Past" Head of Household competition. For this competition, HouseGuests were asked questions based on a seance the group had held earlier in the week. HouseGuests attempted to answer the true or false questions without being the last one to buzz in; being the last to buzz in would result in a HouseGuests elimination. Erika was the winner of the competition. Following the Head of Household competition, the HouseGuests learned that a new special power could impact the game, and that the first HouseGuest to correctly guess a secret phrase would be the winner. To solve the phrase, they were given their first hint, which was a sheep. Following numerous complaints of equipment malfunctions, it was decided that a new competition would be held. That night, HouseGuests competed in a new version of the competition, in which they answered using a movable block; Janelle became the new Head of Household for the third time this season. On Day 40, HouseGuests competed in the "Big Brother Bakery" food competition. For this competition, HouseGuests had to make a three course meal out of slop and serve it to the three judges of the competition. The judges were later revealed to be former Big Brother HouseGuests Nicole Schaffrich, Jun Song, and Marvin Latimer. The HouseGuests earned food for everyday of the week excluding Wednesday, as well as a barbecue. Later that day, Janelle chose to nominate Danielle and Erika for eviction. HouseGuests were later given their second clue for the secret power, which was an over-sized thread and needle. When picking players for the Power of Veto competition, Will, Marcellas, and James were selected to play; Janelle was not able to compete as she had given up the right to play in the previous Power of Veto competition. On Day 41, HouseGuests competed in the "Anything You Can Do, I Can Do Veto" Power of Veto competition. For this competition, the competing HouseGuests participated in competitions taken from previous seasons. Former HouseGuest Nicole hosted the competition, while fellow former HouseGuests April Lewis, Jack Owens, Hardy Ames-Hill, and Scott Long returned to participate in the competitions. The competing HouseGuests wagered how quickly they could perform a task, and failure to do so resulted in their elimination. Danielle was the winner of the Power of Veto. On Day 43, Danielle chose to use the Power of Veto to remove herself from the block, with Marcellas being nominated in her place. HouseGuests were later given the third and final clue, which was a figure of a Grim Reaper entering the house. It was later revealed that Mike had won the Coup d'État, which he could use at any of the next three evictions. He could overthrow the HoH, and nominate two of his own HouseGuests for eviction; the HoH and PoV winner could not be nominated. On Day 46, Marcellas became the sixth HouseGuest to be evicted from the house in a unanimous vote of six to zero. He became the first member of the Jury of Seven.

Following Marcellas's eviction, HouseGuests competed in the "Prom Night" Head of Household competition. For this competition, HouseGuests were asked questions based on a poll that fans had been voting on over the previous week. For each question a HouseGuest answered correctly, they were able to step forward once; the HouseGuest with the most correct answers was the winner. The viewers also voted for the Prom King or Queen, with this winner getting an advantage in the competition; Janelle was selected, however, could not compete as outgoing Head of Household. George was the winner of this competition. Immediately following this, the HouseGuests learned that it was a Double Eviction Week, and that George was required to make his nominations on the spot. He chose to nominate Erika and James for eviction. When picking players for the Power of Veto, Howie, Danielle, and Will were selected to compete; Janelle was selected to host the competition. That same night, HouseGuests competed in the "Gnome Is Where the Veto Is" Power of Veto competition. For this competition, HouseGuests had to make a device that would get them the keys off of a gnome in the backyard; James was the winner. James chose to remove himself from the block, with Howie being nominated in his place. On Day 47, Howie became the seventh HouseGuest to be evicted from the house in a vote of three to two. He became the second member of the Jury of Seven. Following Howie's eviction, HouseGuests competed in the "Revenge of the Gnomes" Head of Household competition. For this, HouseGuests answered multiple choice questions, and would be hit in the face with pie by "gnomes" if they answered incorrectly; Mike was the winner. On Day 48, Mike chose to nominate James and Janelle for eviction. When picking players for the Power of Veto competition, Will, Danielle, and Erika were selected to play; George hosted the competition. On Day 49, HouseGuests competed in the "Voo Voo Dolls" Power of Veto competition. For this, HouseGuests had to find voodoo dolls in the likeness of the previously evicted HouseGuests who were described in the riddles. The last HouseGuest to bring a doll each round was eliminated, and the last remaining HouseGuest was the winner; Janelle won the Power of Veto. Janelle later chose to use the Power of Veto to remove herself from the block, with George being nominated in her place. On Day 53, James became the eighth HouseGuest to be evicted from the house in a vote of three to one. He became the third member of the Jury of Seven.

Following James's eviction, HouseGuests competed in the "But First" Head of Household competition. For this competition, HouseGuests were given an order of two events which happened throughout this season, and had to determine if host Julie Chen was being honest with the order of these events. Erika was the winner of the competition. On Day 54, HouseGuests competed in the "Birds and the Bees" food competition. For this competition, HouseGuests attempted to earn food and prizes by transferring nectar across the backyard by soaking it into their outfits. The HouseGuests earned some foods for the week, with George earning a slop pass and the HouseGuests winning a trampoline and a "Christmas in August" luxury prize. Later that day, Erika chose to nominate George and Janelle for eviction. Neil Patrick Harris later entered the house to participate in the "Christmas in August" prize. On Day 55, all of the remaining HouseGuests competed in the "Two Faced" Power of Veto competition. For this competition, HouseGuests had to correctly figure out which two faces of the HouseGuests made up a set of faces. The HouseGuest who finished the competition in the fastest time was the winner; Janelle won the Power of Veto. On Day 57, Janelle chose to use the Power of Veto to remove herself from the block, with Danielle being nominated in her place. On Day 60, Danielle became the ninth HouseGuest to be evicted in a vote of three to zero. HouseGuests then began competing in the Big Brother Fast Forward week, in which the events of an entire week happened within an hour, meaning that two HouseGuests would be evicted that night. The HouseGuests then competed in the "Battle of the Sexes" Head of Household competition. For this, HouseGuests had to determine whether a male or female HouseGuest was referenced in a given quote; Janelle was the winner. Janelle was immediately required to make her nominations, and she nominated Erika and George for eviction. The HouseGuests then competed in the "I'm Knots About You" Power of Veto competition. For this competition, HouseGuests had to untangle a rope in an attempt to be the first to get a Veto symbol tangled in the rope. Erika was the winner of the competition. During the competition, Will broke his left thumb in an attempt to get his Veto symbol. Erika chose to use the Power of Veto to remove herself from the block, with Mike being nominated in her place. Moments later, George became the tenth HouseGuest to be evicted from the house in a unanimous vote of two to zero.

Following George's eviction, HouseGuests competed in the "Big Brother Bowl" Head of Household competition. For this competition, HouseGuests were given a significant event in the game, and they had to determine what day this event happened. For each day off from the correct answer they were, the HouseGuests would take that many steps back. The HouseGuest who was closest to the end zone at the end of the competition was the winner; Mike was the winner. On Day 61, Mike chose to nominate Erika and Janelle for eviction. On Day 62, the HouseGuests competed in the "When the Stars Align" Power of Veto competition. For this competition, HouseGuests were required to solve the pattern of HouseGuests based on clues given in a puzzle. There are more than one answers to the questions, however, there is only one correct combination. Janelle was the winner of the Power of Veto, making it the fifth time she had won the power. This made Janelle the first HouseGuest to achieve this feat in the history of the series; Janelle still holds the record for most Power of Veto wins. On Day 65, Janelle chose to use the Power of Veto to remove herself from the block, with Will being the only HouseGuest eligible to be nominated. She then cast the sole vote to evict Will from the game. He became the sixth member of the Jury of Seven.

Following Will's eviction, the HouseGuests competed in the "Mount HoH" endurance portion of the final Head of Household competition. For this competition, HouseGuests stood on a large boulder in the backyard while holding onto their house keys; letting go of their key was not permitted. The last HouseGuest remaining on the boulder would be the winner. Minutes after the competition began, Mike chose to drop out of the competition. Janelle, confused by this, accidentally let go of her key. This led to Erika becoming the winner of the competition only a few minutes after it began. Mike and Janelle then competed against one another in the "Fly By Night" competition. Mike was the winner of this competition, and also won a Pontiac Solstice Convertible. On Day 67, Erika and Mike competed in the "Jury Statements" final Head of Household competition, which Mike won. He then cast the sole vote to evict Janelle from the house, making he and Erika the Final Two. On Day 72, Mike became the winner of Big Brother: All-Stars in a jury vote of six to one.

== Episodes ==
No. overall	No. in season	Title	Original release date	U.S. viewers (millions)
228	1	"Episode 1"	July 6, 2006	7.54
229	2	"Episode 2"	July 11, 2006	7.36
230	3	"Episode 3"	July 13, 2006	7.03
231	4	"Episode 4"	July 16, 2006	5.82
232	5	"Episode 5"	July 18, 2006	6.89
233	6	"Episode 6"	July 20, 2006	6.99
234	7	"Episode 7"	July 23, 2006	6.14
235	8	"Episode 8"	July 25, 2006	7.27
236	9	"Episode 9"	July 27, 2006	7.01
237	10	"Episode 10"	July 30, 2006	6.27
238	11	"Episode 11"	August 1, 2006	7.33
239	12	"Episode 12"	August 3, 2006	6.96
240	13	"Episode 13"	August 6, 2006	6.73
241	14	"Episode 14"	August 8, 2006	7.48
242	15	"Episode 15"	August 10, 2006	7.21
243	16	"Episode 16"	August 13, 2006	7.30
244	17	"Episode 17"	August 15, 2006	7.77
245	18	"Episode 18"	August 17, 2006	7.72
256	19	"Episode 19"	August 20, 2006	8.33
247	20	"Episode 20"	August 22, 2006	8.00
248	21	"Episode 21"	August 24, 2006	8.27
249	22	"Episode 22"	August 27, 2006	8.16
250	23	"Episode 23"	August 29, 2006	8.53
251	24	"Episode 24"	August 31, 2006	7.45
252	25	"Episode 25"	September 3, 2006	7.49
253	26	"Episode 26"	September 5, 2006	8.82
254	27	"Episode 27"	September 7, 2006	8.44
255	28	"Episode 28"	September 12, 2006	8.41

== Voting history ==
Color key:

Winner
Runner-up
Head of Household
Nominated for eviction
Evicted

Voting history (season 7)
	Week 1	Week 2	Week 3	Week 4	Week 5	Week 6	Week 7 (Note: This week was a fast forward week. The HouseGuests played a week's worth of games, including Head of Household and veto competitions, and nomination, veto and eviction ceremonies, within 48 hours.)		Week 8		Week 9		Finale
	Week 1	Week 2	Week 3	Week 4	Week 5	Week 6	Day 46	Day 47	Day 54	Day 60 (Note: This week was a double eviction week. Following the first eviction, the remaining HouseGuests played a week's worth of games, including Head of Household and veto competitions, and nomination, veto and eviction ceremonies, during the live show, culminating in a second eviction for the week.)	Day 61	Day 67	Finale
Head(s) of Household	Janelle; Jase	Kaysar	James	Janelle	Danielle	~~Erika~~; Janelle (Note: Erika originally won this week's Head of Household competition. However, due to technical faults with the competition set, the competition was redone and won by Janelle.)	George	Boogie	Erika	Janelle	Boogie	Boogie	(None)
Nominations (initial)	Alison; Danielle	Diane; Nakomis	George; Will	Boogie; Erika	James; Janelle	Danielle; Erika	Erika; James	James; Janelle	George; Janelle	Erika; George	Erika; Janelle	(None)	(None)
Veto winner	Janelle	Erika	George	Boogie	Janelle	Danielle	James	Janelle	Janelle	Erika	Janelle	(None)	(None)
Nominations (final)	Alison; Danielle	Diane; Nakomis	Jase; Will	Diane; Erika	James; Kaysar	Erika; Marcellas	Erika; Howie	George; James	Danielle; George	Boogie; George	Erika; Will	Erika; Janelle	(None)
Boogie	Alison	Nakomis	Jase	Diane	Kaysar	Marcellas	Howie	Head of Household	Danielle	Nominated	Head of Household	Janelle (Note: As Head of Household, Boogie chose to evict Janelle.)	Winner
Erika	Alison	Nakomis	Jase	Nominated	Kaysar	Nominated	Nominated	James	Head of Household	George	Nominated	Nominated	Runner-up
Janelle	Co-Head of Household (Note: Janelle and Jase were co-Heads of Household. Both had to agree on nominating two HouseGuests for eviction.)	Diane	Jase	Head of Household	~~James~~ (Note: During week 5's Head of Household competition, James won the right to nullify another HouseGuest's eviction vote. He chose to nullify Janelle's vote.)	Head of Household	Erika	James	Danielle	Head of Household	Will	Evicted (Day 67)	Boogie
Will	Alison	Diane	Nominated	Erika	Kaysar	Marcellas	Howie	James	Danielle	George	Nominated	Evicted (Day 65)	Boogie
George	Alison	Nakomis	Jase	Diane	Kaysar	Marcellas	Head of Household	Nominated	Nominated	Nominated	Evicted (Day 60)		Boogie
Danielle	Nominated	Nakomis	Jase	Diane	Head of Household	Marcellas	Howie	George	Nominated	Evicted (Day 60)			Boogie
James	Alison	Nakomis	Head of Household	Diane	Nominated	Marcellas	Erika	Nominated	Evicted (Day 53)				Boogie
Howie	Alison	Nakomis	Jase	Diane	James	Marcellas	Nominated	Evicted (Day 47)					Boogie
Marcellas	Alison	Nakomis	Jase	Diane	Kaysar	Nominated	Evicted (Day 46)						Erika
Kaysar	Alison	Head of Household	Jase	Diane	Nominated	Evicted (Day 39)							
Diane	Danielle	Nominated	Jase	Nominated	Evicted (Day 32)								
Jase	Co-Head of Household	Nakomis	Nominated	Evicted (Day 25)									
Nakomis	Danielle	Nominated	Evicted (Day 18)										
Alison	Nominated	Evicted (Day 11)											
Evicted	Alison; 8 of 10 votes to evict	Nakomis; 8 of 10 votes to evict	Jase; 9 of 9 votes to evict	Diane; 7 of 8 votes to evict	Kaysar; 5 of 6 votes to evict	Marcellas; 6 of 6 votes to evict	Howie; 3 of 5 votes to evict	James; 3 of 4 votes to evict	Danielle; 3 of 3 votes to evict	George; 2 of 2 votes to evict	Will; Janelle's choice to evict	Janelle; Boogie's choice to evict	Boogie; 6 votes to win
Evicted	Alison; 8 of 10 votes to evict	Nakomis; 8 of 10 votes to evict	Jase; 9 of 9 votes to evict	Diane; 7 of 8 votes to evict	Kaysar; 5 of 6 votes to evict	Marcellas; 6 of 6 votes to evict	Howie; 3 of 5 votes to evict	James; 3 of 4 votes to evict	Danielle; 3 of 3 votes to evict	George; 2 of 2 votes to evict	Will; Janelle's choice to evict	Janelle; Boogie's choice to evict	Erika; 1 vote to win

== Production ==
=== Development ===
In September 2003, following the ratings success of Big Brother 4, Entertainment Weekly confirmed that CBS had renewed the series leading up until 2006, ensuring three more seasons to air during the Summer time period. This meant that Big Brother: All-Stars was the last of these three seasons. The season was officially greenlit in October 2005, the first time a Big Brother season had been renewed before the Winter time period. Rumors of an All-Stars season had been circulating for quite some time, with much speculation believing the previous season was going to feature an All-Star cast. Big Brother 6 HouseGuest Kaysar Ridha confirmed shortly after the finale of his season that he had been approached about joining the season. Despite this, TMZ later reported that a Celebrity edition of the series would be airing instead, though CBS never confirmed or denied this. In April 2006, it was officially confirmed that the seventh season would be an All-Star season. It was also confirmed that the viewers would be able to vote for some of the contestants to be featured in this season. 20 potential HouseGuests were revealed, and it was confirmed that a total of twelve HouseGuests would be competing in this season, and that the viewers would select half of this cast. The candidates for this season were revealed during a special casting episode aired on June 21, 2006. It was reported that more than 2.4 million votes were cast within the first 18 hours of the poll to select the HouseGuests being opened. Voting ended on June 28, 2006.

=== House ===
The house theme for Big Brother: All Stars was "A House of Extremes". There were large neon flames in the lounge, gothic design features such as gargoyles, and in one bedroom, a tarantula cage. For the first time, the house had a billiards table. The house kept Big Brother 6's two-story idea, with a large Head of Household room. In a twist only featured during this season, the Head of Household room's decor changed depending on who held the title. Artefacts from previous Big Brother seasons hung on the walls.

=== Prizes ===
The 14 HouseGuests this season were competing for the main prize of $500,000. The winner of the series, determined by the previously evicted HouseGuests, would win the $500,000 prize, while the Runner-Up would receive a $50,000 prize. Other than the main prize, various luxuries and prizes were given out throughout the season.

This is the first season to introduce a popularity vote known as America's Favorite Juror (called America's Favorite HouseGuest from season 11 and including all evicted HouseGuests) where a viewer vote decides which Juror is the season's fan favorite for a $25,000 prize.

== Broadcast ==
Big Brother: All-Stars was broadcast on CBS from July 6, 2006, to September 12, 2006. This season lasted for a total of 72 days, making it the shortest season at the time. This season featured a slight change to the schedule that was used in the previous edition, with episodes airing on Tuesdays, Thursday, and Sunday each week. This was a change from the previous season, which aired on Saturdays instead of Sundays. The Thursday episode, which aired at 8 pm Eastern Time, featured the live eviction and subsequent Head of Household competition taking place. During the live eviction, the show was hosted by Julie Chen. The Sunday episode, which aired at 8 pm Eastern Time, featured the food competition and nomination ceremony, as well as some highlights from the previous days. The Tuesday episode, which aired at 8 pm Eastern Time, featured the Power of Veto competition and the Power of Veto ceremony, along with more highlights of recent events in the game. Some changes to the scheduling format were made. The season premiere, for example, featured both the Head of Household competition and the nomination ceremony.

The website for the series featured a "Love 'Em or Leave 'Em" poll, in which fans could monitor the popularity of the HouseGuests each week. Much like the previous editions, the live feeds were also available again for this season. HouseGuests enter the house a few days before the premiere, and the feeds are not live for the first few days. They later go live after the broadcast of the launch episode. This season saw the return of the spin-off series House Calls: The Big Brother Talk Show. Due to being in the house, Marcellas Reynolds did not co-host this season, thus different co-hosts were used throughout the season. The web series aired thirty-minute episodes on weeknights, and allowed fans to call in and express their opinions on the events of the game. Evicted HouseGuests were also interviewed on the series following their eviction. Additionally, a mobile package was introduced this season. Fans could text a code to a number displayed during the show to become "Mobile Pack" subscribers. For a small fee, they would receive daily video and text alerts about events in the house as well as exclusive "Diary Room" interview footage not available anywhere else. They also were able to download ringtones and wallpapers for their phones. This service, titled "Big Brother Goes Mobile." was an Emmy finalist for Outstanding Creative Achievement in Interactive Television. It was also revealed after the finalists had been determined that a member of the Jury, as decided by America, would win an additional prize of $25,000. Though not being included in the eighth edition, this prize (or a slight variation including all evicted HouseGuests, not just jurors) would be featured in all subsequent seasons of Big Brother (including Celebrity Big Brother but excluding Big Brother: Over the Top).

== Reception ==
=== Ratings ===
Big Brother: All-Stars had an average of 7.56 million viewers, a slight increase from the previous edition. This season premiered to a total of 7.69 million viewers, the lowest-rated premiere at the time. The Thursday, July 27 edition of the series featured a total of 7.2 million viewers, winning in its time slot. For that week, the series averaged 7.3 million viewers. The Thursday, August 3 edition also had an audience of 7.2 million viewers, making it the second week in a row. The Tuesday, August 8 episode featured an average of 7.6 million viewers. The Tuesday, August 22 episode averaged a total of eight million viewers.
