= Julie Chen Moonves =

American journalist and television host (born 1970)

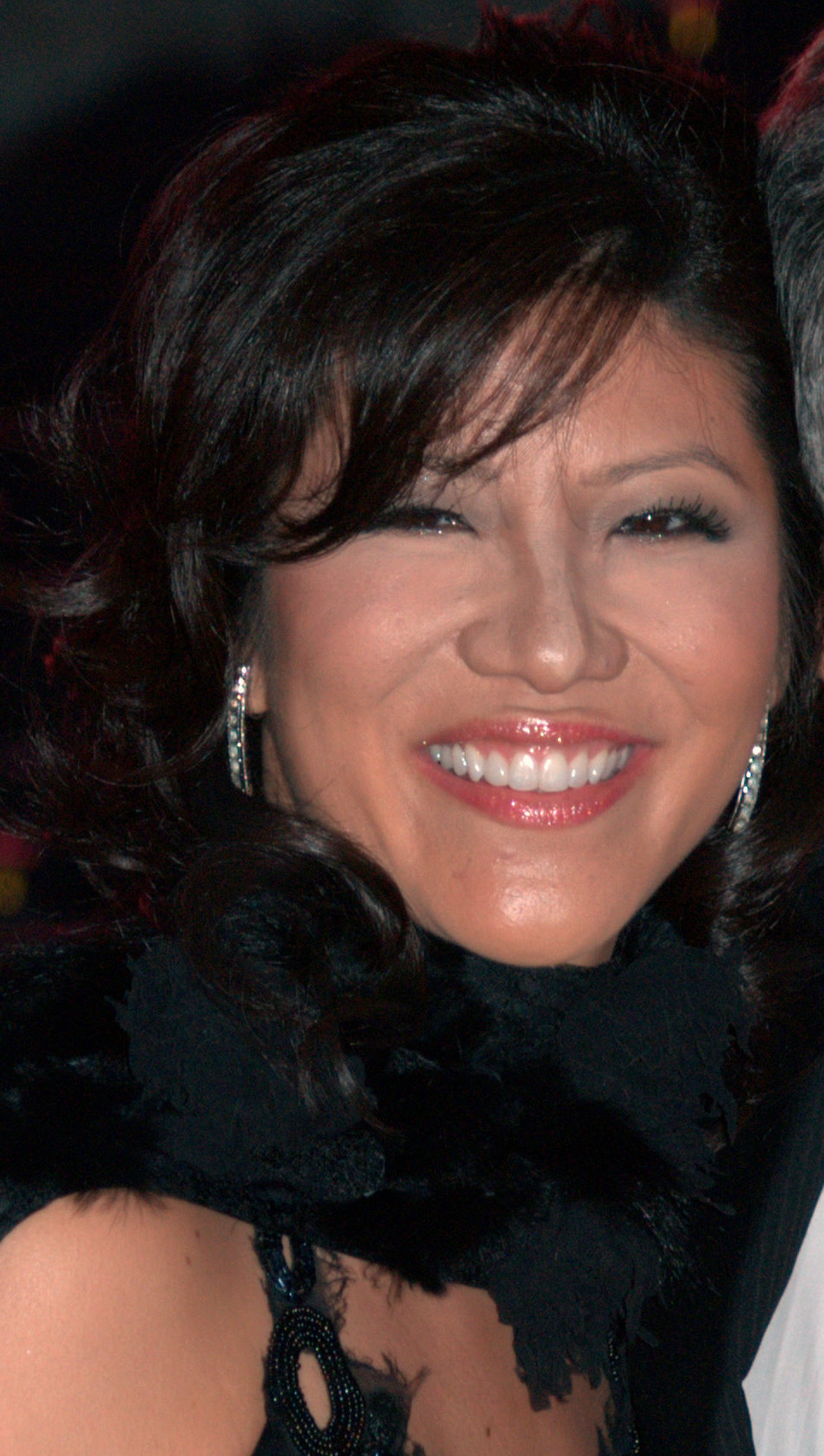
- Chen Moonves in 2009
- Born: Julie Suzanne Chen; January 6, 1970 (age 56); New York City, U.S.
- Education: University of Southern California (BA)
- Occupations: Presenter; anchor; producer
- Years active: 1987–present
- Spouse: Les Moonves (m. 2004)
- Children: 1

Julie Chen Moonves
- Traditional Chinese: 陳曉怡
- Simplified Chinese: 陈晓怡
Transcriptions
Standard Mandarin
- Hanyu Pinyin: Chén Xiǎoyí
- Wade–Giles: Ch'en^{2} Hsiao^{3}-yi^{2}
- IPA: [ʈʂʰə̌n ɕjàʊ.ǐ]

Julie Suzanne Chen Moonves (née Chen; born January 6, 1970) is an American television presenter, news anchor, and producer for CBS. She has been the host of the American version of the CBS reality-television program Big Brother since its debut in July 2000.

From 2002 to 2010, she was a co-anchor of The Early Show on CBS. In 2004, Chen married CBS executive Les Moonves. Starting in 2010, Chen Moonves was a co-host and the moderator of the CBS Daytime talk show The Talk, until 2018 when she left the show following multiple sexual assault and sexual harassment allegations against her husband Les Moonves that came to light. Following this, she began using her married name with the September 13, 2018 episode of Big Brother, signing off with, "I'm Julie Chen Moonves, goodnight." This broke her established pattern of previously signing off simply as, "Julie Chen".

In 2018, Chen Moonves authored her first children's book, When I Grow Up, dedicated to her son, Charlie.

== Early life and education ==
The daughter of Chinese immigrants, Julie Chen was born in Queens, New York City. Chen's mother, Wang Ling Chen, grew up in Rangoon, Burma. Her father, David Chen, was born in China, and subsequently fled to Taiwan following the Chinese Civil War. Chen's maternal grandfather, Lou Gaw Tong, grew up "dirt poor" in the rural village of Penglai in Fujian province of China, and became wealthy through a chain of grocery stores and ultimately became a polygamist with nine wives and 11 children. Julie has two older sisters, Gladys and Victoria.

Chen attended junior high school in the Whitestone area of Queens. Chen went on to graduate from St. Francis Preparatory School in 1987. She attended the University of Southern California and graduated in 1991, majoring in broadcast journalism and English.

== Career ==
In June 1990, Chen began interning alongside Andy Cohen at CBS Morning News, where she answered phones and copied faxes for distribution. The following year, while still in school, she worked for ABC NewsOne for one season as a desk assistant. She was subsequently promoted to work as a producer for the next three years. The following year, she relocated to Dayton, Ohio, to work as a local news reporter for WDTN-TV, from 1995 to 1997.

In 2015, Chen revealed on The Talk that during her time in Dayton her news director had told her that she would never become a news anchor because of her "Asian eyes". After a "big-time agent" agreed and advised her to get plastic surgery, she made the decision to have a surgical procedure to reduce the epicanthic folds of her eyes.

From 1999 to 2002, Chen was the anchor of CBS Morning News and news anchor of CBS This Morning and later The Early Show, alongside Bryant Gumbel, Jane Clayson, Hannah Storm, Harry Smith, Maggie Rodriguez, Erica Hill, and Rene Syler. From 2002 to 2010, she was a co-host of The Early Show on CBS, before leaving the daily position but remaining as a special contributing anchor of the program until its cancelation. Before CBS News, she was a reporter and weekend anchor at WCBS-TV in New York City.

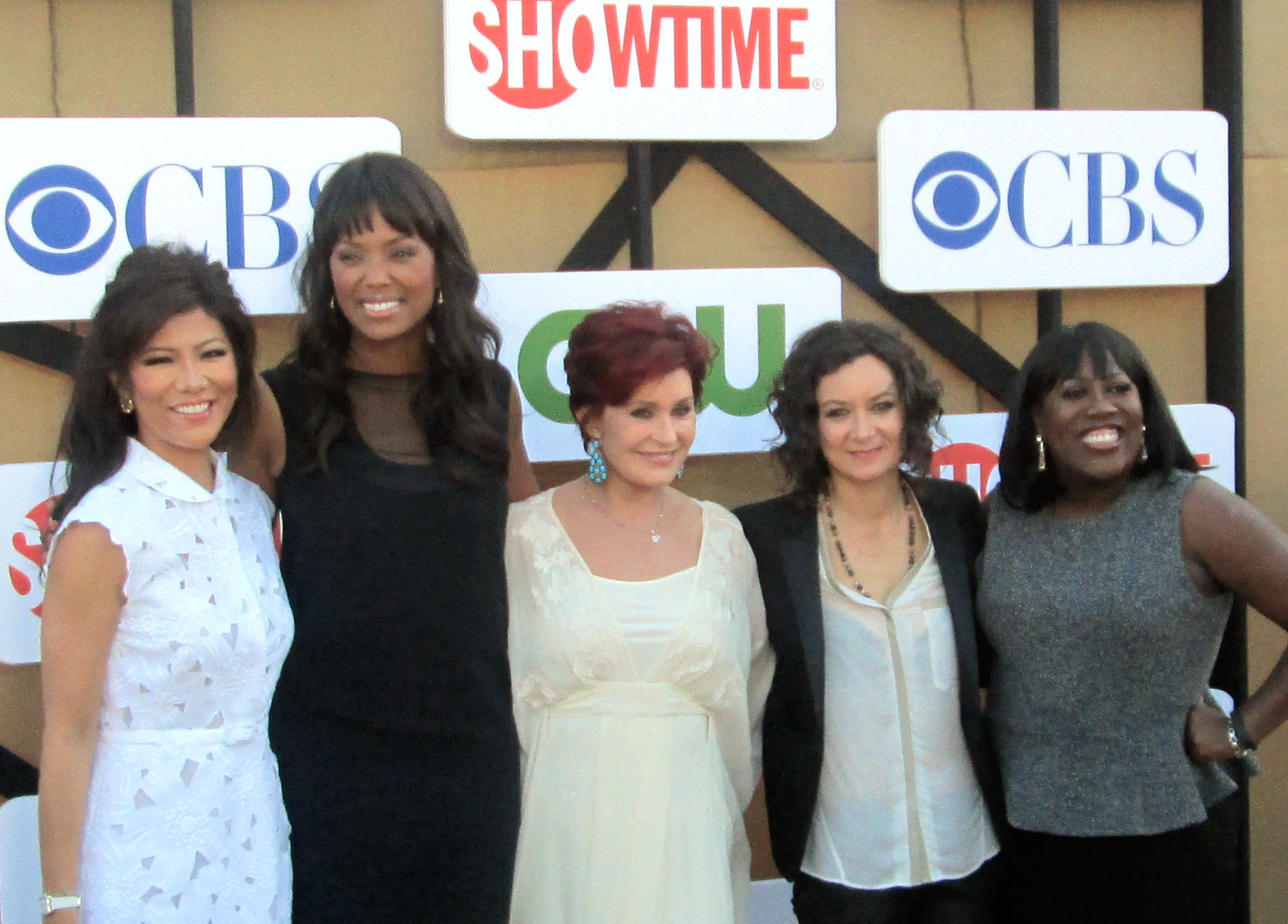
The Talk co-hostesses Julie Chen, Aisha Tyler, Sharon Osbourne, show creator Sara Gilbert, and Sheryl Underwood in 2012

Since 2000, she has also been the host of the American version of Big Brother. During the first season (2000), Chen was widely criticized for her heavily scripted, wooden delivery in her interaction with the studio audience and in the interviews on the live programs, earning her the nickname "Chenbot". She has indicated in two interviews that she takes no personal offense at the term, adding that it may derive from her "precise on-air style" which comes from "a desire to be objective." She again acknowledged the nickname when she proudly proclaimed, "I am the Chenbot!" in a segment on The Early Show.

Chen was the moderator and co-host of the CBS Daytime talk show, The Talk, which premiered on October 18, 2010. The show featured Chen, the show creator Sara Gilbert, Sharon Osbourne, Leah Remini, Holly Robinson Peete and Marissa Jaret Winokur. Chen says that Remini and Robinson Peete complained about her to CBS and demanded that she be ousted from the show. Instead, it was the two actresses who were gone after the first season. Chen says she has since reconciled with them.

On September 18, 2018, Chen announced in a prerecorded tape that she would not be returning to The Talk because she needed "to spend more time at home with [her] husband", after a number of sexual assault allegations surfaced against her husband Les Moonves.

In her 2023 audiobook But First, God: An Audio Memoir of Spiritual Discovery, she says she was "collateral damage" following the decision to oust Moonves at CBS. She says the day before Season 9 of The Talk premiered, she was told that "two of my co-hosts called the powers at CBS and said, 'If Julie shows up to work tomorrow, we're not coming in.' So, I was basically told, 'Please don't come back to work anymore.'" Her Talk co-hosts at the time were Gilbert, Osbourne, Sheryl Underwood and Eve.

== Personal life ==
Following her graduation from the University of Southern California as a broadcasting and English major, she became a news assistant for ABC News in Los Angeles, in September 1991. There, she met her future longtime boyfriend, television news editor Gary Donahue, though their relationship did not last. She began dating Les Moonves, president and chief executive officer of CBS Television, during his marriage to Nancy Wiesenfeld Moonves, and on April 22, 2003, a week after Les Moonves signed a five-year, multimillion-dollar contract with Viacom, his wife filed for divorce in Los Angeles Superior Court citing irreconcilable differences. Divorce proceedings were delayed for almost two years because of financial settlement disagreements. On December 10, 2004, Moonves got a court to grant an early divorce, leaving spousal support and child support to be determined at a later date.

On December 23, 2004, Chen and Moonves were married in a private ceremony in Acapulco, Mexico. On September 24, 2009, Chen gave birth to their son, Charlie.

In September 2013, during the first week of Season 4 of The Talk, Chen revealed that she had undergone blepharoplasty early in her career after being pressured by her previous news director and a high-profile agent to look less Asian. Chen said that her decision "divided" her family, but stated she must "live with every decision that I've made and it got me to where we are today. And I'm not going to look back."

Following a series of sexual misconduct allegations against her husband Les Moonves in 2018, she began using her married name beginning with the September 13, 2018, episode of Big Brother, signing off with, "I'm Julie Chen Moonves, goodnight." This broke her established pattern where previously she would sign off simply as Julie Chen. The sign-off received a mixed response from viewers and fans on social media. CBS officially confirmed she would return to host the second season of Celebrity Big Brother in a press release on November 27, 2018, using the name "Julie Chen Moonves".

In her audiobook, But First, God: An Audio Memoir of Spiritual Discovery, released on September 19, 2023, she revealed that she had embraced Christianity in 2018 after never having attended a Sunday church service. She told Good Morning America: "Julie Chen before she found God was self-absorbed, career-minded, vain, gossipy — fun to be with, but probably kind of a shallow person. Julie Chen Moonves, who now knows the Lord, is someone who wants to help others; who wants to look at everyone with a soft heart."

== Books ==
- Chen Moonves, Julie (2018). When I Grow Up. Illustrator: Diane Goode. New York: Simon & Schuster Books for Young Readers. ISBN 9781481497190. OCLC 989996358.
- Chen Moonves, Julie (2023). But First, God: An Audio Memoir of Spiritual Discovery. Simon & Schuster Audio Originals. ISBN 1797158554

Media offices
First	The Talk co-host 2010–2018	Succeeded by Carrie Ann Inaba
