= List of Big Brother (American TV series) houseguests =

As of Big Brother 28, a total of 381 participants have competed in Big Brother, Big Brother: Over the Top, and Big Brother: Reindeer Games and 46 of them have competed in multiple seasons. A total of 34 participants have competed in Celebrity Big Brother, which increases the total number of Big Brother participants to 415. Big Brother 7 was an All-Star edition, which featured 14 returning HouseGuests chosen either through viewer vote or by producers from an initial group of 20 candidates. For Big Brother 11, four past HouseGuests were given the chance to return based on the results of the season's first competition, after which one of them entered the house. Big Brother 13 featured three "Dynamic Duos" from previous seasons, Big Brother 14 brought in four Big Brother veterans to coach the 12 new HouseGuests and Big Brother 18 saw the return of four returnees playing the game with 12 new HouseGuests. In Big Brother: Over the Top, former HouseGuests Jason Roy and Jozea Flores were given the chance to return through a public vote. Roy won the public vote and became the 13th HouseGuest. Big Brother 19 brought along the return of a past HouseGuest as the 17th HouseGuest, but that HouseGuest was actually there to take the spot of one of the 16 new HouseGuests, as a consequence for one of the newbies taking a temptation. Big Brother 22 was another All-Star edition, featuring 16 returning HouseGuests, all chosen by production. Big Brother: Reindeer Games was a special holiday themed "Legends" edition, with 9 returning HouseGuests, as well as 3 other former HouseGuests participating solely as hosts. Big Brother 27 and Big Brother 28 brought along the return of a past HouseGuest as a surprise HouseGuest.

While locked inside the House, the HouseGuests are free to leave the game for any unforeseen reason ("Walking"), though they will not be allowed re-entry; as of September 2022, only four HouseGuests have left the game over the course of its history. (Note: Season 8 winner "Evel" Dick Donato was the lone exception; although he left the game early in Season 13 due to being HIV-positive, he did make an surprise appearance on that season's final night.) Although this has rarely occurred, should any of the HouseGuests break the rules of the game, they are immediately removed from the House ("Getting expelled") and barred from return; as of November 2023, only five expulsions have occurred throughout the history of the show.

== Key legend ==
^ Contestant played the game for a second time.
◊ Contestant played the game for a third time.
† Contestant played the game for a fourth time.

== Seasons 1–10 (2000–2008) ==
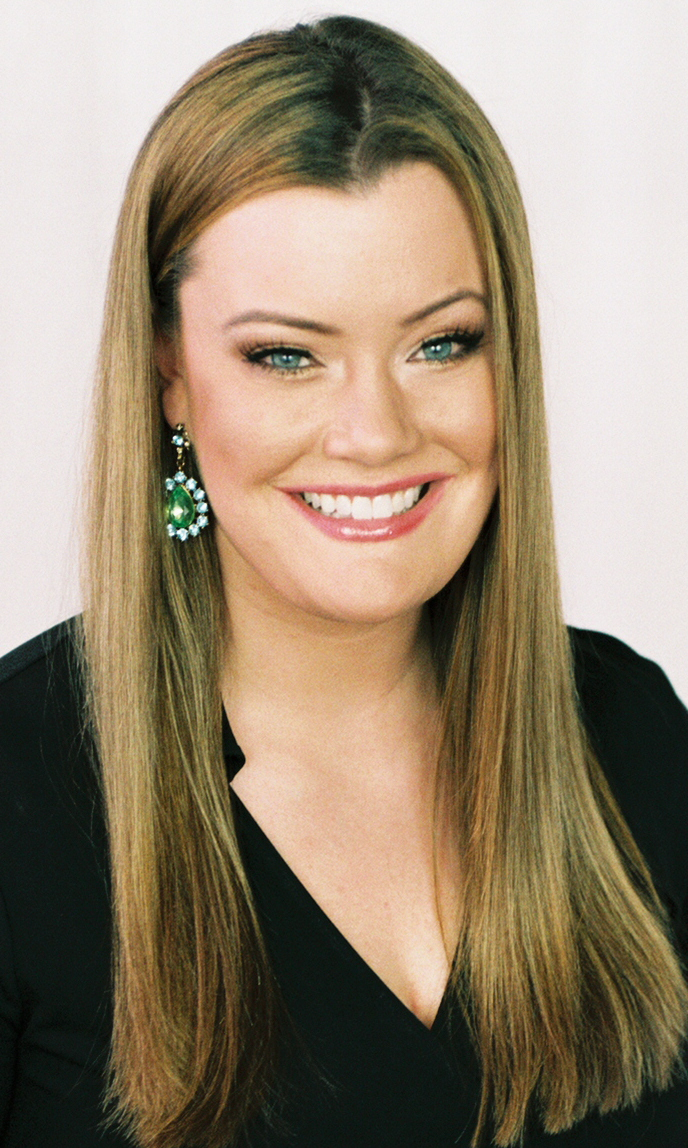
Jamie Kern, Big Brother 1

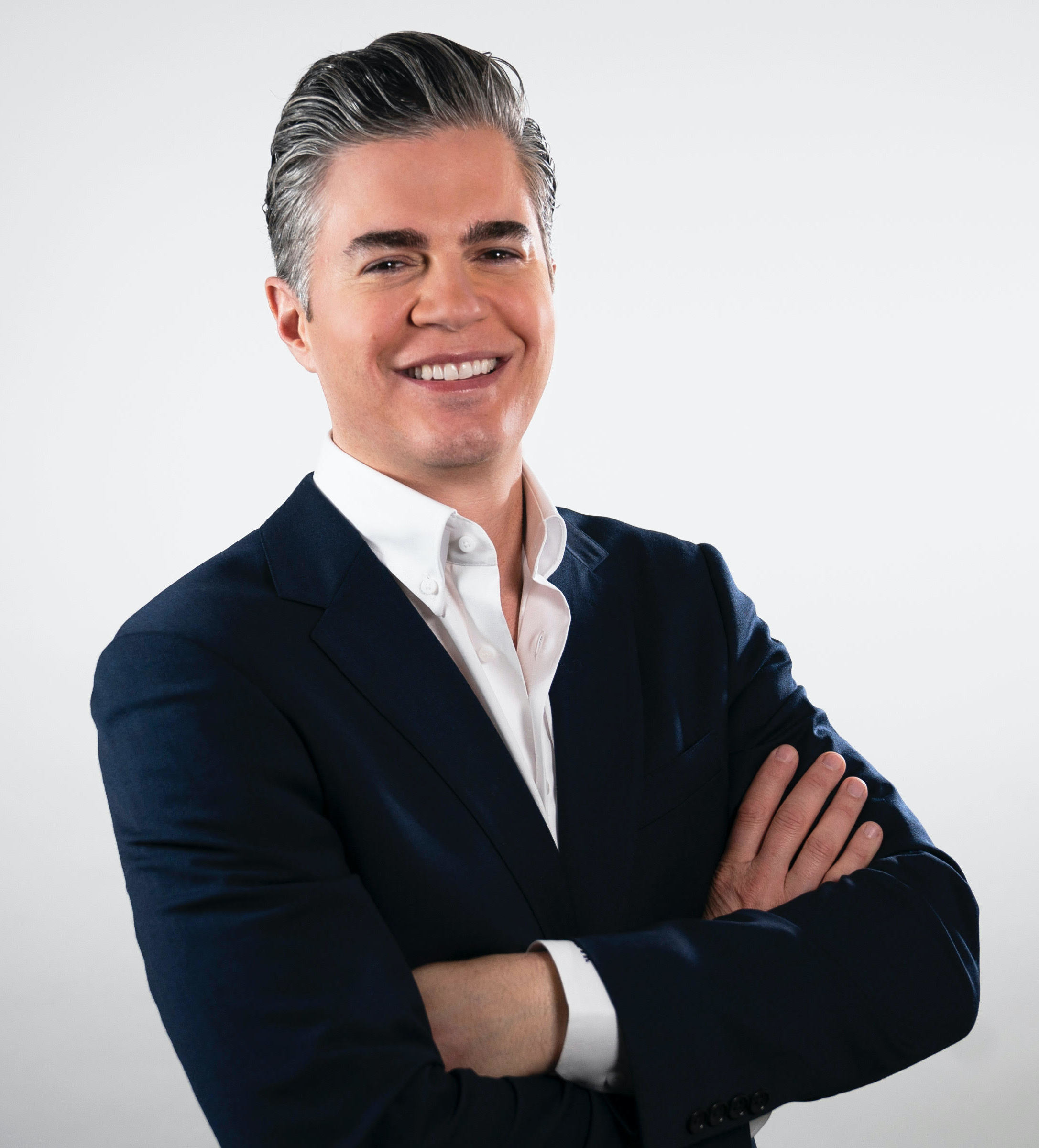
Will Kirby, Big Brother 2 and Big Brother 7: All Stars

Marcellas Reynolds, Big Brother 3 and Big Brother 7: All Stars

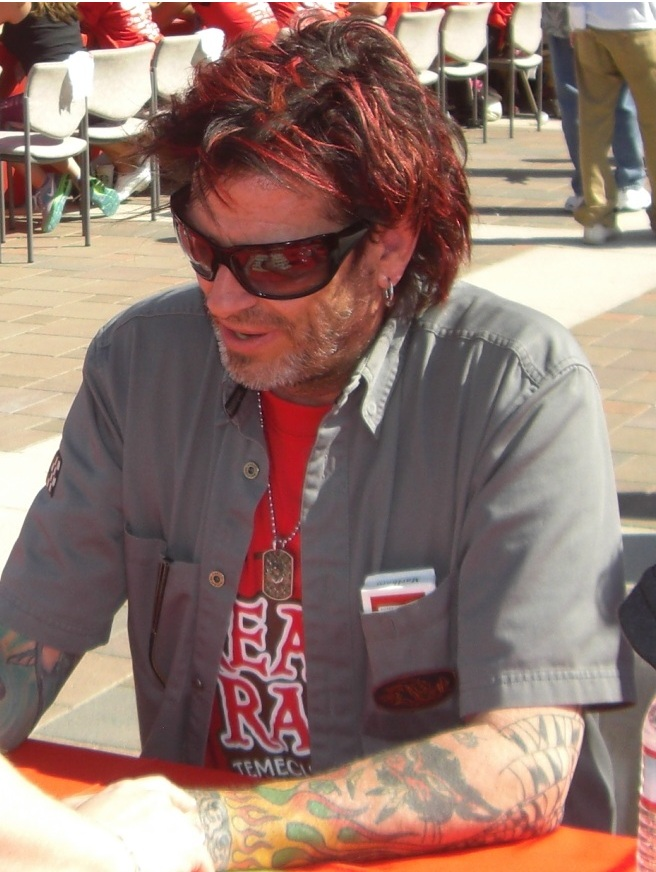
Dick Donato, Big Brother 8 and Big Brother 13

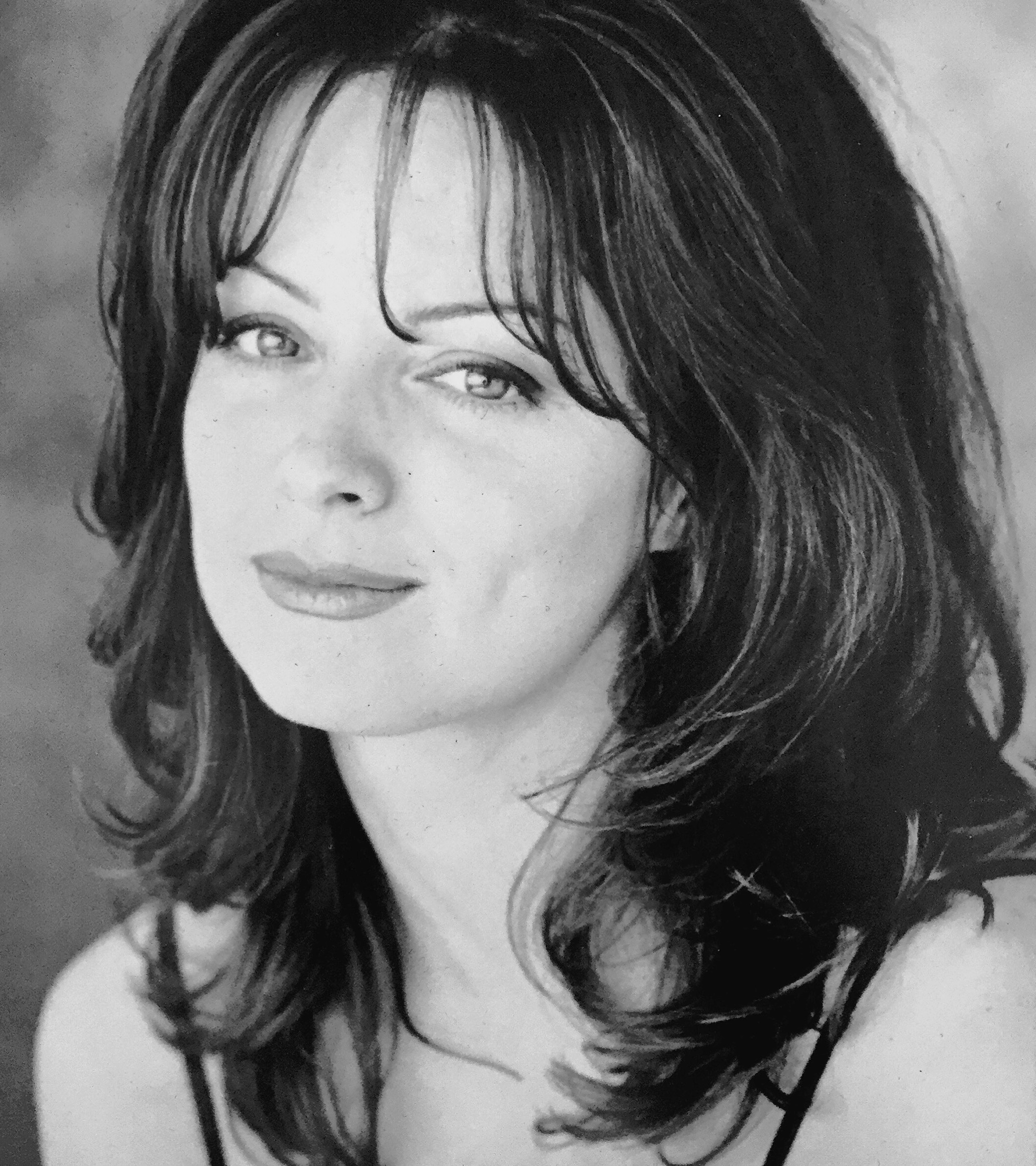
Sheila Kennedy, Big Brother 9

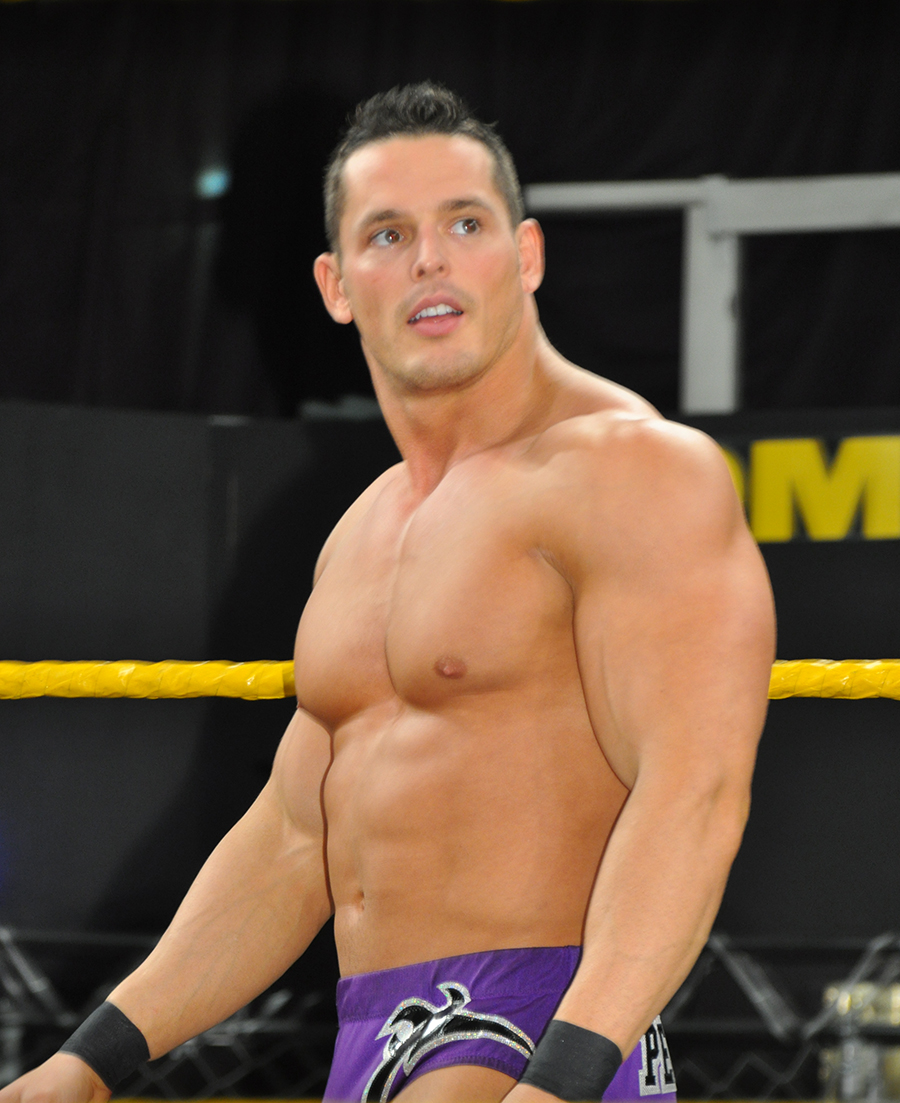
Jessie Godderz, Big Brother 10, and Big Brother 11

Name	Age^{[I]}	Hometown^{[II]}	Profession	Season	Status	Finish
William Collins	27	Philadelphia, PA	Politician	Big Brother 1	Banished: Day 16	10th
Jean Jordan	26	Roanoke, VA	Exotic dancer	Big Brother 1	Banished: Day 29	9th
Karen Fowler	43	Columbus, IN	Mother	Big Brother 1	Banished: Day 43	8th
Brittany Petros	25	Robbinsdale, MN	Actress	Big Brother 1	Banished: Day 57	7th
Cassandra Waldon	37	Havre de Grace, MD	UN communications director	Big Brother 1	Banished: Day 71	6th
George "Chicken" Boswell	41	Rockford, IL	Roofer	Big Brother 1	Banished: Day 78	5th
Jamie Kern	22	Seattle, WA	Model	Big Brother 1	Banished: Day 85	4th
Curtis Kin	28	New York City, NY	Lawyer	Big Brother 1	Finalist: Day 88	3rd
Joshua Souza	23	San Luis Obispo, CA	Civil engineering student	Big Brother 1	Finalist: Day 88	2nd
Eddie McGee	21	Commack, NY	Entertainment industry	Big Brother 1	Finalist: Day 88	1st
Justin Sebik	26	Bayonne, NJ	Bartender	Big Brother 2	Expelled: Day 10	12th
Sheryl Braxton	43	Ponte Vedra Beach, FL	Interior decorator	Big Brother 2	Evicted: Day 12	11th
Autumn Daly	28	Irving, TX	Aspiring singer	Big Brother 2	Evicted: Day 18	10th
Shannon Dragoo	29	San Antonio, TX	Real estate agent	Big Brother 2	Evicted: Day 26	9th
Mike "Boogie" Malin	30	Los Angeles, CA	Bar owner	Big Brother 2	Evicted: Day 33	8th
Kent Blackwelder	46	Powell, TN	Mortgage broker	Big Brother 2	Evicted: Day 40	7th
Krista Stegall	28	Opelousas, LA	Waitress	Big Brother 2	Evicted: Day 47	6th
Bill "Bunky" Miller	36	Harrisburg, NC	Technical writer	Big Brother 2	Evicted: Day 61	5th
Hardy Ames-Hill	31	York, PA	Account executive	Big Brother 2	Evicted: Day 68	4th
Monica Bailey	40	Brooklyn, NY	Candy store manager	Big Brother 2	Evicted: Day 77	3rd
Nicole Nilson Schaffrich	31	Atlanta, GA	Personal chef	Big Brother 2	Finalist: Day 82	2nd
Will Kirby	28	Miami, FL	Physician	Big Brother 2	Finalist: Day 82	1st
Lori Olsen	39	Foxboro, WI	Bank representative	Big Brother 3	Evicted: Day 13	12th
Tonya Paoni	35	Las Vegas, NV	Retail sales	Big Brother 3	Evicted: Day 20	11th
Eric Ouellette	27	Milford, CT	Firefighter	Big Brother 3	Evicted: Day 34	10th
Josh Feinberg	28	Queens, NY	Waiter	Big Brother 3	Evicted: Day 41	9th
Chiara Jude Berti	25	New York City, NY	Marketing representative	Big Brother 3	Evicted: Day 48	8th
Gerald "Gerry" Lancaster	51	Shadow Hills, CA	Teacher	Big Brother 3	Evicted: Day 55	7th
Roddy Mancuso	30	Morristown, NJ	Writer	Big Brother 3	Evicted: Day 62	6th
Marcellas Reynolds	32	Chicago, IL	Fashion stylist	Big Brother 3	Evicted: Day 69	5th
Amy Crews	23	Memphis, TN	Real estate appraiser	Big Brother 3	Evicted: Day 27; Evicted: Day 76	4th
Jason Guy	25	Mobile, AL	Videographer	Big Brother 3	Evicted: Day 78	3rd
Danielle Reyes	30	Fairfield, CA	Media buyer	Big Brother 3	Finalist: Day 82	2nd
Lisa Donahue	26	Los Angeles, CA	Bartender	Big Brother 3	Finalist: Day 82	1st
Scott Weintraub	33	Chicago, IL	Waiter	Big Brother 4	Expelled: Day 8	13th
Amanda Craig	25	Chicago, IL	Bar manager	Big Brother 4	Evicted: Day 12	12th
Michelle Maradie	19	Boca Raton, FL	Student	Big Brother 4	Evicted: Day 19	11th
David Lane	21	Deerfield Beach, FL	Former Army Ranger	Big Brother 4	Evicted: Day 26	10th
Dana Varela	28	Queens, NY	Karate school manager	Big Brother 4	Evicted: Day 33	9th
Nathan Marlow	23	Edmond, OK	Personal trainer	Big Brother 4	Evicted: Day 40	8th
Justin Giovinco	22	Pittsburgh, PA	Headhunter	Big Brother 4	Evicted: Day 47	7th
Jack Owens Jr.	58	Birmingham, AL	Former FBI agent	Big Brother 4	Evicted: Day 54	6th
Jee Choe	23	Elmhurst, NY	Bookkeeper	Big Brother 4	Evicted: Day 61	5th
Erika Landin	33	Los Angeles, CA	Pilates instructor	Big Brother 4	Evicted: Day 68	4th
Robert Roman	33	Los Angeles, CA	Restaurant manager	Big Brother 4	Evicted: Day 75	3rd
Alison Irwin	22	Meadville, PA	Retail sales manager	Big Brother 4	Finalist: Day 82	2nd
Jun Song	27	New York City, NY	Investment manager	Big Brother 4	Finalist: Day 82	1st
Mike Lubinski	41	Eastpointe, MI	Commercial painter	Big Brother 5	Evicted: Day 14	14th
Lori Valenti	26	Woburn, MA	Yoga instructor	Big Brother 5	Evicted: Day 21	13th
Holly King	27	Los Angeles, CA	Model	Big Brother 5	Evicted: Day 28	12th
Scott Long	25	Pittsburgh, PA	Sales representative	Big Brother 5	Evicted: Day 35	11th
Jason "Jase" Wirey	28	Decatur, IL	Volunteer firefighter	Big Brother 5	Evicted: Day 42	10th
Will Wikle	26	Tupelo, MS	Registered nurse	Big Brother 5	Evicted: Day 49	9th
Natalie Carroll	30	Birmingham, AL	Fitness professional	Big Brother 5	Evicted: Day 56	8th
Adria Klein	30	Birmingham, AL	Fitness professional	Big Brother 5	Evicted: Day 63	7th
Marvin Latimer	36	Conway, SC	Mortician	Big Brother 5	Evicted: Day 64	6th
Karen Ann (O'Neil) Ganci	30	Spring Hill, FL	Portrait artist	Big Brother 5	Evicted: Day 70	5th
Jennifer "Nakomis" Dedmon	21	San Antonio, TX	Restaurant hostess	Big Brother 5	Evicted: Day 75	4th
Diane Henry	22	Burlington, KY	Cocktail waitress	Big Brother 5	Evicted: Day 78	3rd
Michael "Cowboy" Ellis	23	Durant, OK	Security officer	Big Brother 5	Finalist: Day 82	2nd
Drew Daniel	22	Urbana, OH	College graduate	Big Brother 5	Finalist: Day 82	1st
Ashlea Evans	22	Plantation, FL	Fashion design student	Big Brother 6	Evicted: Day 10	14th
Michael Donnellan	28	Orange County, CA	Artist	Big Brother 6	Evicted: Day 19	13th
Eric "Cappy" Littmann	36	Boston, MA	Firefighter	Big Brother 6	Evicted: Day 26	12th
Sarah Hrejsa	23	Chicago, IL	Retail manager	Big Brother 6	Evicted: Day 40	11th
Kaysar Ridha	24	Irvine, CA	Graphic designer	Big Brother 6	Evicted: Day 33; Evicted: Day 47	10th
Jennifer Vasquez	27	Plano, TX	Arena Football League dancer	Big Brother 6	Evicted: Day 49	9th
Rachel Plencner	33	Parker, CO	Horse breeder	Big Brother 6	Evicted: Day 49	8th
James Rhine	29	Atlanta, GA	Loss prevention manager	Big Brother 6	Evicted: Day 61	7th
Beau Beasley	25	Pembroke Pines, FL	Personal shopper	Big Brother 6	Evicted: Day 62	6th
Howie Gordon	34	Chicago, IL	Meteorology student	Big Brother 6	Evicted: Day 68	5th
April Lewis	31	Dallas, TX	Pharmaceutical sales representative	Big Brother 6	Evicted: Day 73	4th
Janelle Pierzina	25	Miami Beach, FL	VIP cocktail waitress	Big Brother 6	Evicted: Day 76	3rd
Ivette Corredero	25	Miami Beach, FL	Waitress	Big Brother 6	Finalist: Day 80	2nd
Maggie Ausburn	27	Las Vegas, NV	Emergency room nurse	Big Brother 6	Finalist: Day 80	1st
Alison Irwin ^{^}	25	Meadville, PA	Medical sales	Big Brother 7 (All-Stars)	Evicted: Day 11	14th
Jennifer "Nakomis" Dedmon ^{^}	23	San Antonio, TX	Restaurant host	Big Brother 7 (All-Stars)	Evicted: Day 18	13th
Jason "Jase" Wirey ^{^}	30	Taylorville, IL	Safety director	Big Brother 7 (All-Stars)	Evicted: Day 25	12th
Diane Henry ^{^}	24	Cincinnati, OH	Model/actress	Big Brother 7 (All-Stars)	Evicted: Day 32	11th
Kaysar Ridha ^{^}	25	Irvine, CA	Graphic designer	Big Brother 7 (All-Stars)	Evicted: Day 39	10th
Marcellas Reynolds ^{^}	36	Chicago, IL	Celebrity stylist	Big Brother 7 (All-Stars)	Evicted: Day 46	9th
Howie Gordon ^{^}	35	Chicago, IL	Lightsaber salesman	Big Brother 7 (All-Stars)	Evicted: Day 47	8th
James Rhine ^{^}	30	Miami, FL	Loss prevention manager	Big Brother 7 (All-Stars)	Evicted: Day 53	7th
Danielle Reyes ^{^}	34	Vacaville, CA	Property manager	Big Brother 7 (All-Stars)	Evicted: Day 60	6th
George "Chicken" Boswell ^{^}	47	Rockford, IL	Hotel promotions	Big Brother 7 (All-Stars)	Evicted: Day 60	5th
Will Kirby ^{^}	33	Miami, FL	Physician	Big Brother 7 (All-Stars)	Evicted: Day 65	4th
Janelle Pierzina ^{^}	26	Grand Rapids, MN	VIP cocktail waitress	Big Brother 7 (All-Stars)	Evicted: Day 67	3rd
Erika Landin ^{^}	36	Chicago, IL	Pilates instructor	Big Brother 7 (All-Stars)	Finalist: Day 72	2nd
Mike "Boogie" Malin ^{^}	35	Concord, NH	Restaurateur	Big Brother 7 (All-Stars)	Finalist: Day 72	1st
Carol Journey	21	Lawrence, KS	Student	Big Brother 8	Evicted: Day 13	14th
Joseph "Joe" Barber II	23	Chicago, IL	Receptionist	Big Brother 8	Evicted: Day 20	13th
Michael "Mike" Dutz	26	Three Lakes, WI	Painting contractor	Big Brother 8	Evicted: Day 27	12th
Nicholas "Nick" Starcevic	25	Kimball, MN	Former football player	Big Brother 8	Evicted: Day 34	11th
Kail Harbick	37	McKenzie Bridge, OR	Business owner	Big Brother 8	Evicted: Day 41	10th
Dustin Erikstrup	22	Chicago, IL	Shoe salesman	Big Brother 8	Evicted: Day 48	9th
Jennifer "Jen" Marie Johnson	23	Beverly Hills, CA	Nanny	Big Brother 8	Evicted: Day 55	8th
Amber M. Siyavus	27	Las Vegas, NV	Cocktail waitress	Big Brother 8	Evicted: Day 62	7th
Jessica Lynn Hughbanks	21	Haysville, KS	College student	Big Brother 8	Evicted: Day 69	6th
Eric Scott Stein	27	New York City, NY	Talent management assistant	Big Brother 8	Evicted: Day 69	5th
Jameka Cameron	28	Waldorf, MD	School counselor	Big Brother 8	Evicted: Day 74	4th
Zachary "Zach" Swerdzewski	30	Burbank, CA	Graphic designer	Big Brother 8	Evicted: Day 76	3rd
Daniele Donato	20	Huntington Beach, CA	Waitress	Big Brother 8	Finalist: Day 81	2nd
Dick Donato	44	Los Angeles, CA	Bar manager	Big Brother 8	Finalist: Day 81	1st
Jacob Heald	23	Dallas, GA	Electrician	Big Brother 9	Evicted: Day 3	16th
Neil Garcia	29	Los Angeles, CA	Real estate agent	Big Brother 9	Walked: Day 7	15th
Parker Somerville	26	Northridge, CA	Paparazzo	Big Brother 9	Evicted: Day 14	14th
Jen Diturno	26	Columbus, OH	Bartender	Big Brother 9	Evicted: Day 14	13th
Amanda Hansen	23	Fridley, MN	Paralegal	Big Brother 9	Evicted: Day 21	12th
Alexander "Alex" Coladonato	24	Staten Island, NY	DJ company owner	Big Brother 9	Evicted: Day 21	11th
Allison Nichols	28	Boston, MA	Pharmaceutical sales representative	Big Brother 9	Evicted: Day 28	10th
Matthew "Matt" McDonald	23	Charlestown, MA	Roofing foreman	Big Brother 9	Evicted: Day 42	9th
Chelsia Hart	21	Cedar Falls, IA	College student	Big Brother 9	Evicted: Day 49	8th
Joshuah Welch	25	Dallas, TX	Advertising media buyer	Big Brother 9	Evicted: Day 56	7th
James Zinkand	21	Sarasota, FL	Riding bicycle around the world	Big Brother 9	Evicted: Day 35; Evicted: Day 63	6th
Natalie Lynn Cunial	28	Salem, OR	Bikini barista	Big Brother 9	Evicted: Day 70	5th
Sharon Obermueller	23	Olathe, KS	Real estate agent	Big Brother 9	Evicted: Day 3 Evicted: Day 75	4th
Sheila Kennedy	45	Reseda, CA	Former model	Big Brother 9	Evicted: Day 77	3rd
Ryan Quicksall	27	Columbus, OH	College student	Big Brother 9	Finalist: Day 81	2nd
Adam Jasinski	29	Delray Beach, FL	Public relations manager	Big Brother 9	Finalist: Day 81	1st
Brian Hart	27	San Francisco, CA	Telecommunications manager	Big Brother 10	Evicted: Day 9	13th
Steven Daigle	35	Dallas, TX	Rodeo competitor	Big Brother 10	Evicted: Day 16	12th
Angie Swindell	29	Orlando, FL	Pharmaceutical sales representative	Big Brother 10	Evicted: Day 24	11th
Jessie Godderz	22	Huntington Beach, CA	Professional bodybuilding, professional wrestler	Big Brother 10	Evicted: Day 31	10th
Libra Thompson	31	Spring, TX	Human resources representative	Big Brother 10	Evicted: Day 38	9th
April Dowling	30	Higley, AZ	Financial manager	Big Brother 10	Evicted: Day 45	8th
Michelle Costa	28	Cumberland, RI	Real estate agent	Big Brother 10	Evicted: Day 52	7th
Bryan Ollie	27	Bloomington, MN	Marketing sales representative	Big Brother 10	Evicted: Day 52	6th
Lorenza "Renny" Martyn	53	New Orleans, LA	Beauty salon owner	Big Brother 10	Evicted: Day 59	5th
Keesha Smith	29	Burbank, CA	Waitress	Big Brother 10	Evicted: Day 64	4th
Jerry MacDonald	75	Magnolia, TX	Retired marketing executive and Marine Corps	Big Brother 10	Evicted: Day 66	3rd
Robert "Memphis" Garrett	25	Los Angeles, CA	Mixologist	Big Brother 10	Finalist: Day 71	2nd
Dan Gheesling	24	Dearborn, MI	Catholic school teacher	Big Brother 10	Finalist: Day 71	1st

== Seasons 11–20 (2009–2018) ==
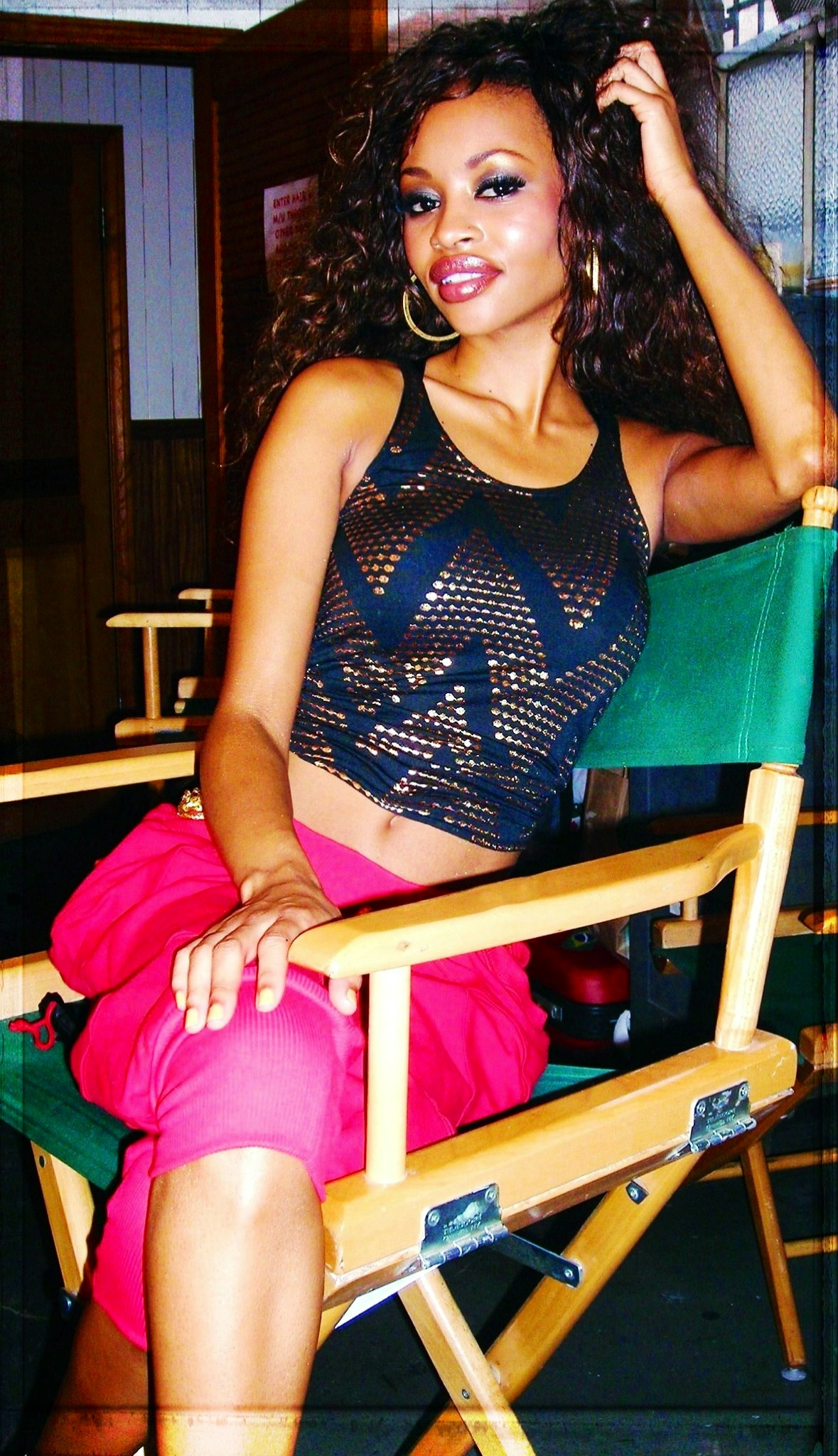
Chima Simone, Big Brother 11

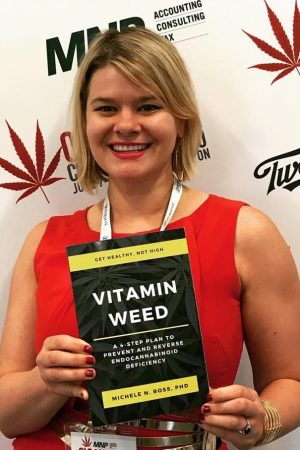
Michele Noonan, Big Brother 11

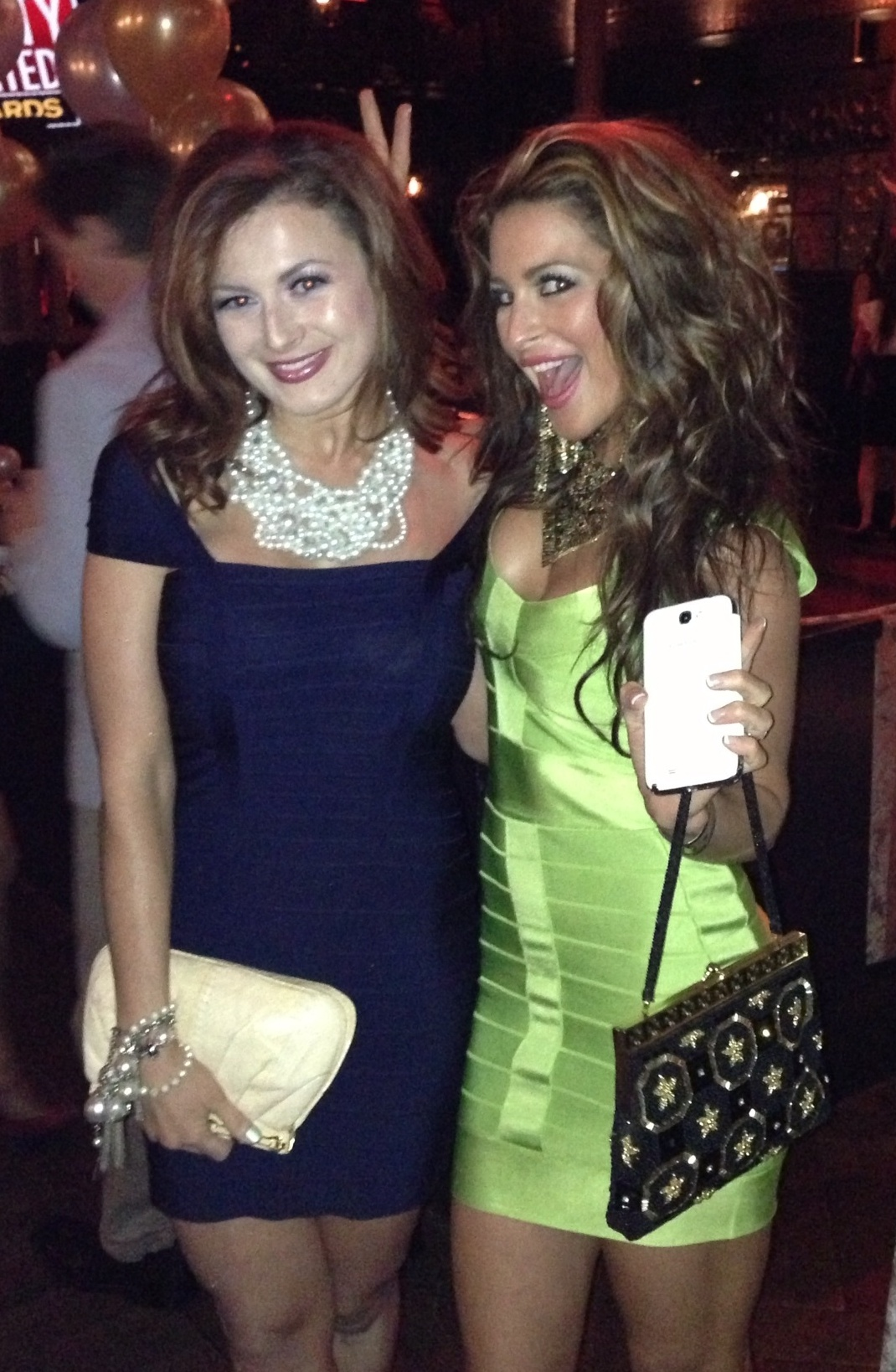
Rachel Reilly, Big Brother 12, Big Brother 13 and Big Brother 27 and Elissa Slater, Big Brother 15

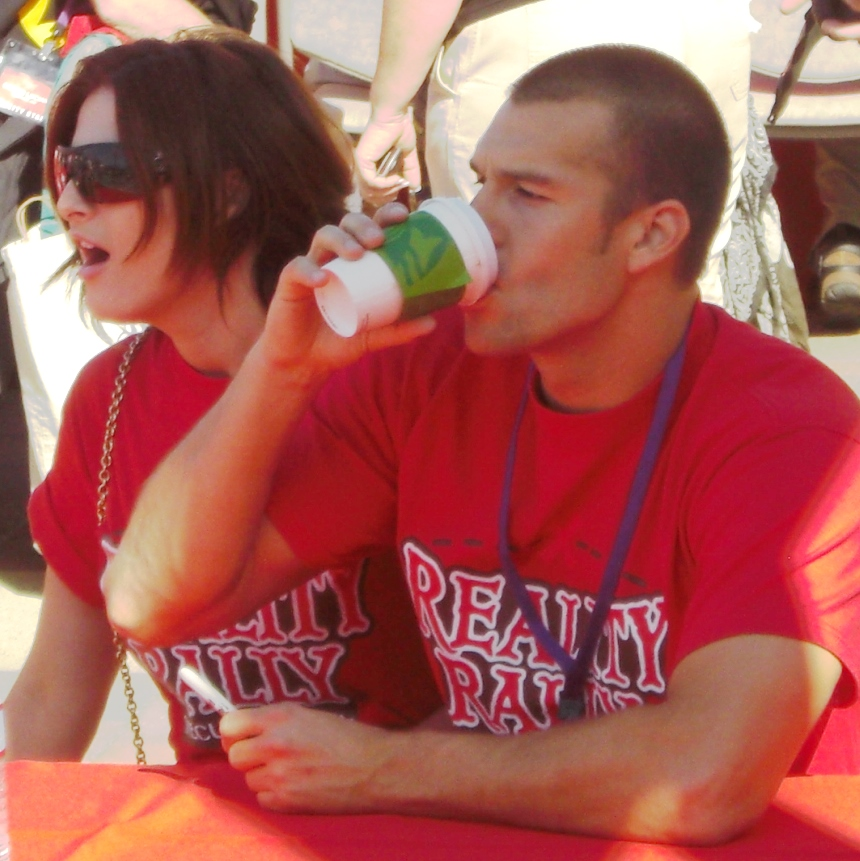
Brendon Villegas, Big Brother 12 and Big Brother 13

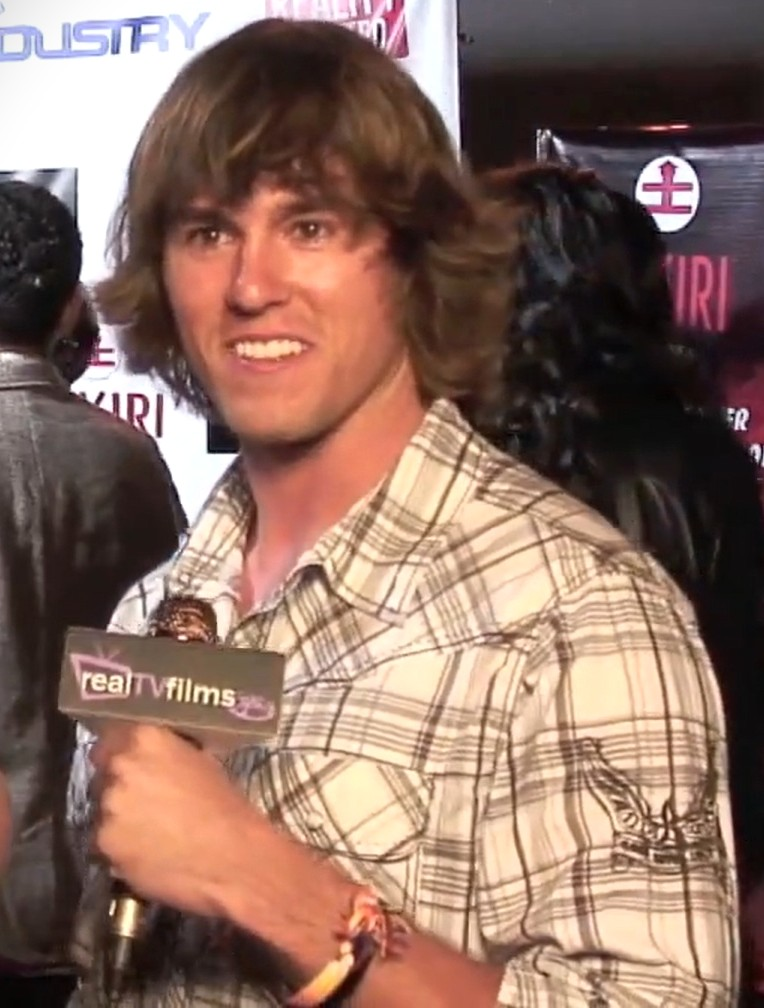
Hayden Moss, Big Brother 12

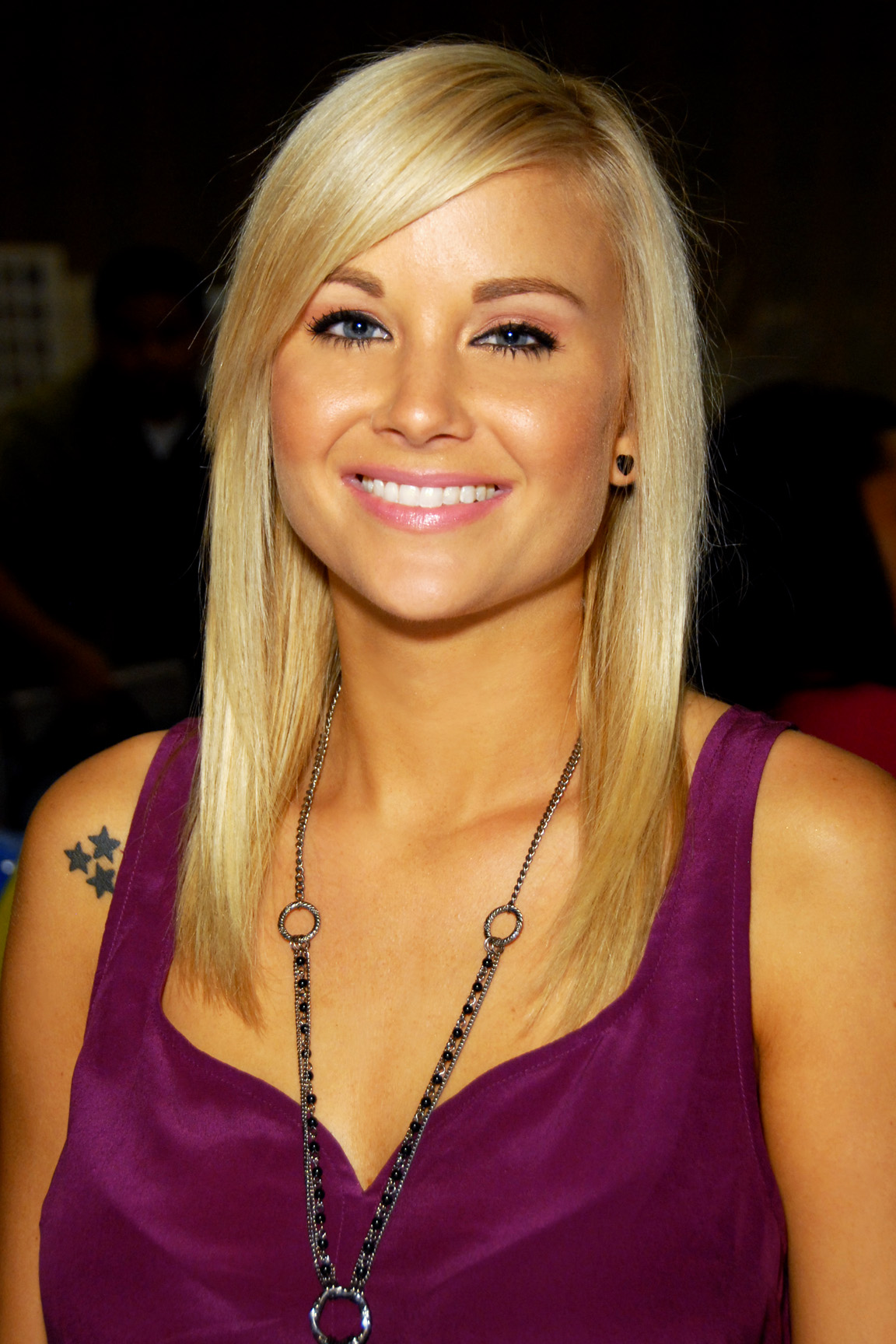
Kara Monaco, Big Brother 14

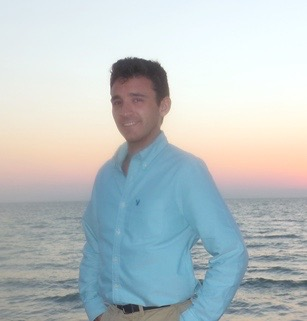
Ian Terry, Big Brother 14 and Big Brother 22: All Stars

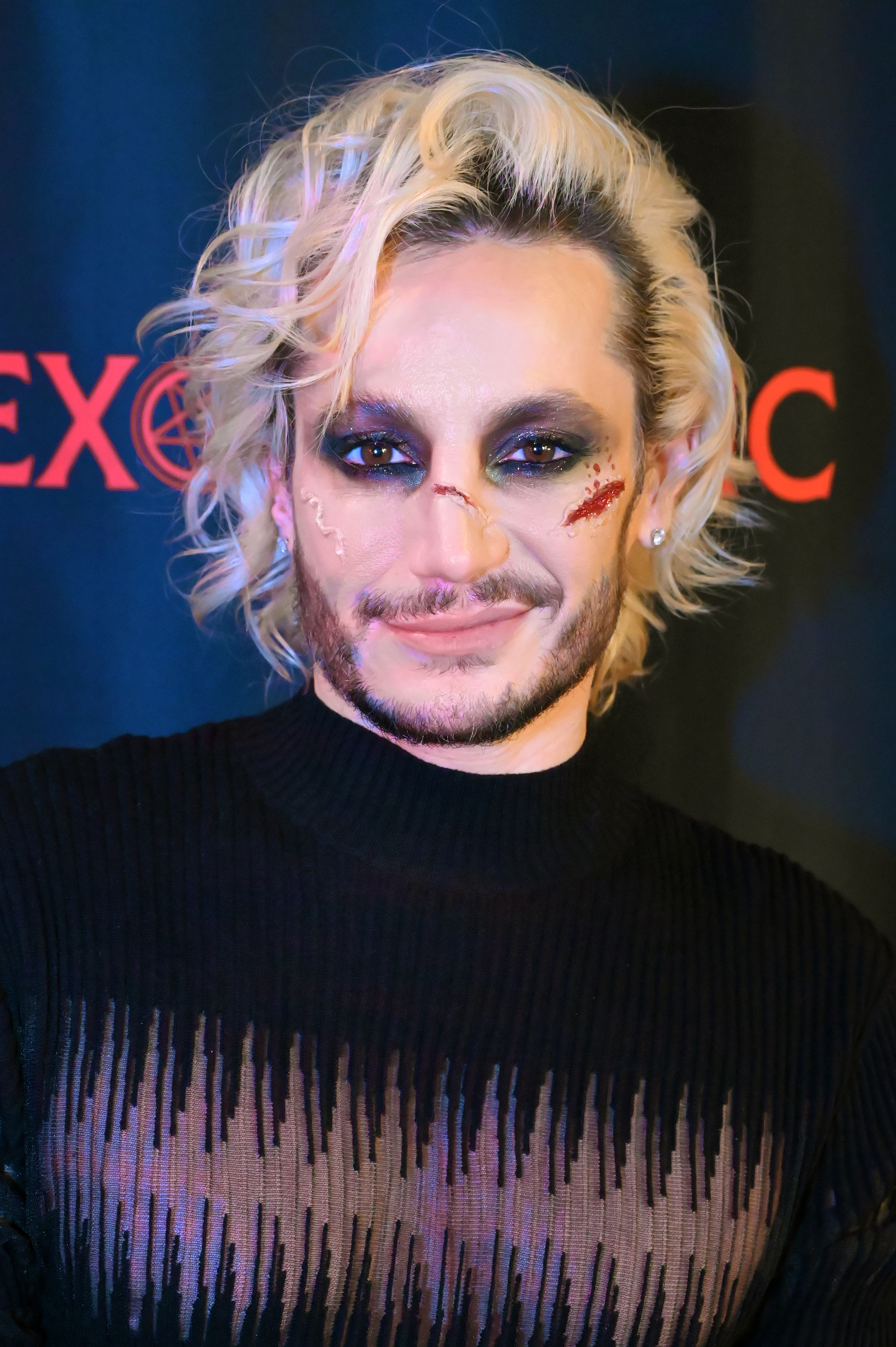
Frankie Grande, Big Brother 16 and Big Brother Reindeer Games

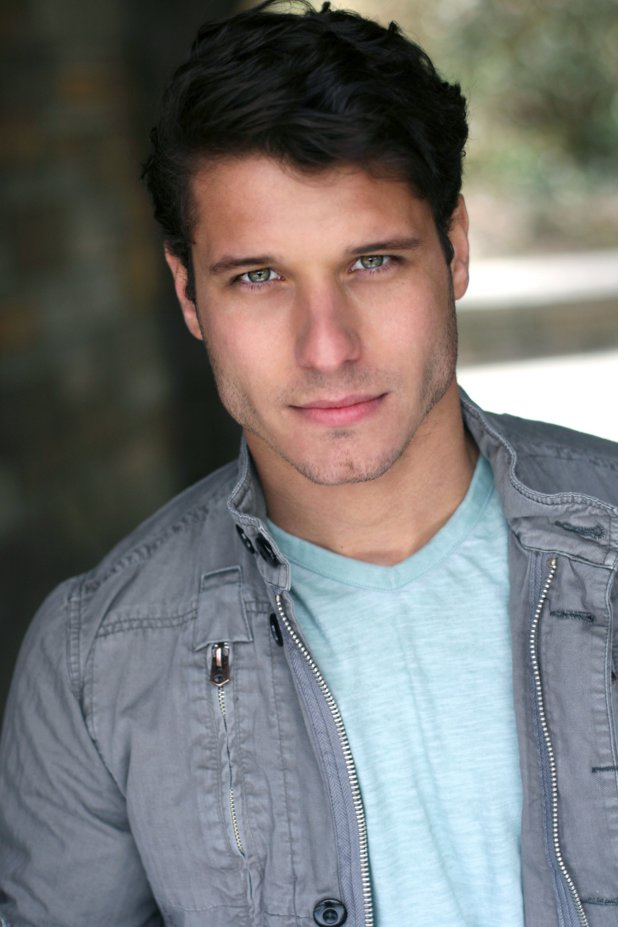
Cody Calafiore, Big Brother 16, Big Brother 22: All Stars and Big Brother Reindeer Games

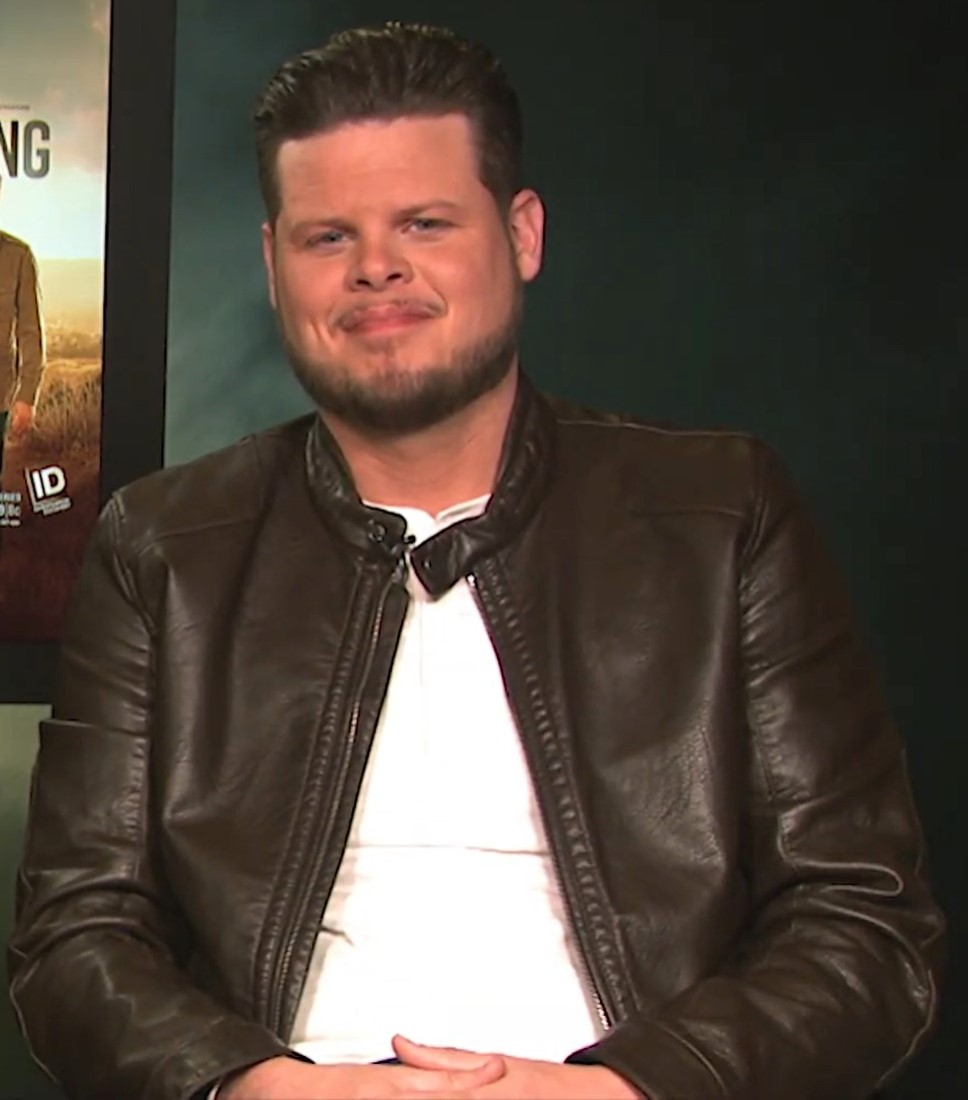
Derrick Levasseur, Big Brother 16

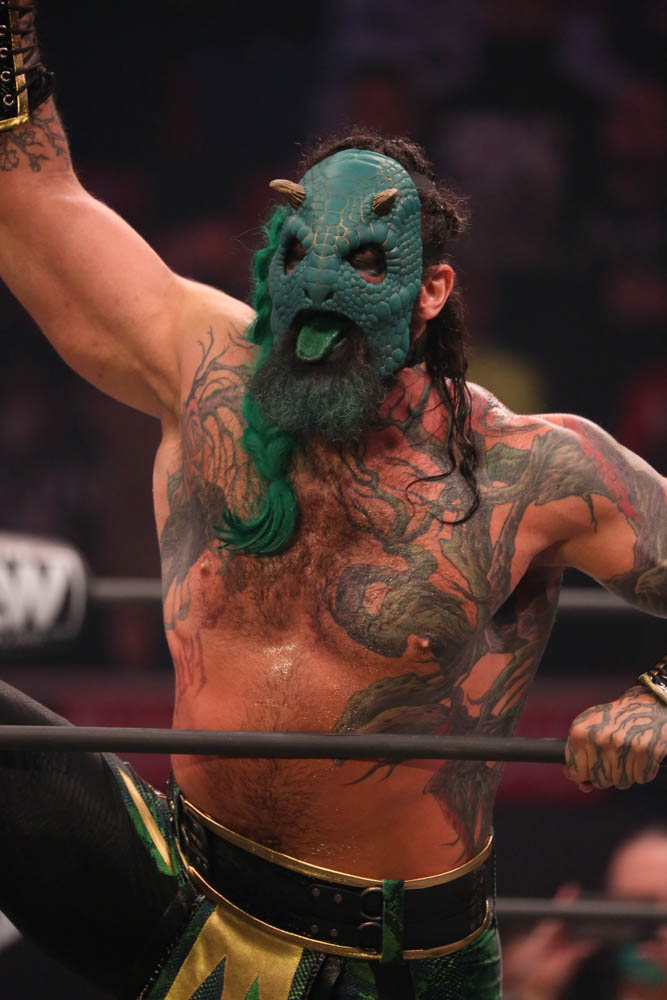
Austin Matelson, Big Brother 17

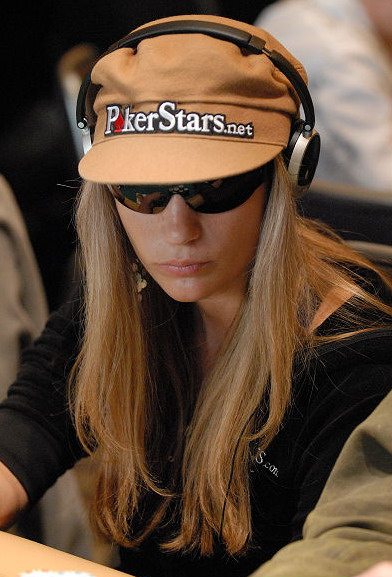
Vanessa Rousso, Big Brother 17

Name	Age^{[I]}	Hometown^{[II]}	Profession	Season	Status	Finish
Braden Bacha	28	Dana Point, CA	Surfer	Big Brother 11	Evicted: Day 12	13th
Laura Crosby	21	Atlanta, GA	Bikini model	Big Brother 11	Evicted: Day 19	12th
Casey Turner	41	Tampa, FL	Teacher/DJ	Big Brother 11	Evicted: Day 26	11th
Ronnie Talbott	30	Belpre, OH	Gamer	Big Brother 11	Evicted: Day 33	10th
Jessie Godderz ^{^}	23	Huntington Beach, CA	Professional bodybuilder, professional wrestler	Big Brother 11	Evicted: Day 40	9th
Chima Simone	32	West Hollywood, CA	Freelance journalist	Big Brother 11	Expelled: Day 42	8th
Lydia Tavera	24	Torrance, CA	Special effects make-up artist	Big Brother 11	Evicted: Day 47	7th
Russell Kairouz	24	Walnut Creek, CA	Mixed martial arts fighter	Big Brother 11	Evicted: Day 54	6th
Jeff Schroeder	31	Chicago, IL	Advertising salesman	Big Brother 11	Evicted: Day 61	5th
Michele Noonan	27	Pasadena, CA	Neuroscientist	Big Brother 11	Evicted: Day 66	4th
Kevin Campbell	29	Chula Vista, CA	Graphic designer	Big Brother 11	Evicted: Day 73	3rd
Natalie Martinez	24	Gilbert, AZ	Tae kwon do champion	Big Brother 11	Finalist: Day 73	2nd
Jordan Lloyd	22	Matthews, NC	Waitress	Big Brother 11	Finalist: Day 73	1st
Annie Whittington	27	Tampa, FL	Bartender	Big Brother 12	Evicted: Day 13	13th
Monet Stunson	24	Glen Carbon, IL	Model	Big Brother 12	Evicted: Day 20	12th
Andrew Ian Gordon	39	Miami Beach, FL	Podiatrist	Big Brother 12	Evicted: Day 27	11th
Kristen Bitting	24	Philadelphia, PA	Boutique manager	Big Brother 12	Evicted: Day 34	10th
Rachel Reilly	25	Las Vegas, NV	Graduate student, cocktail waitress	Big Brother 12	Evicted: Day 41	9th
Kathy Hillis	40	Texarkana, AR	Deputy sheriff, sergeant	Big Brother 12	Evicted: Day 48	8th
Matt Hoffman	32	Elgin, IL	Web designer	Big Brother 12	Evicted: Day 55	7th
Brendon Villegas	30	Riverside, CA	High school swim coach	Big Brother 12	Evicted: Day 55	6th
Ragan Fox	34	West Hollywood, CA	College professor	Big Brother 12	Evicted: Day 62	5th
Britney Haynes	22	Huntington, AR	Hotel sales manager	Big Brother 12	Evicted: Day 67	4th
Vincenzo "Enzo" Palumbo	32	Bayonne, NJ	Insurance adjuster	Big Brother 12	Evicted: Day 75	3rd
Lane Elenburg	24	Decatur, TX	Oil rig salesman	Big Brother 12	Finalist: Day 75	2nd
Hayden Moss	24	Tempe, AZ	College student	Big Brother 12	Finalist: Day 75	1st
Dick Donato ^{^}	48	Los Angeles, CA	Website CEO	Big Brother 13	Walked: Day 6	14th
Keith Henderson	32	Bolingbrook, IL	Human resources manager	Big Brother 13	Evicted: Day 13	13th
Cassi Colvin	26	Nashville, TN	Model	Big Brother 13	Evicted: Day 20	12th
Dominic Briones	25	San Mateo, CA	College student, model	Big Brother 13	Evicted: Day 27	11th
Lawon Exum	39	Inglewood, CA	Legal file clerk	Big Brother 13	Evicted: Day 41	10th
Brendon Villegas ^{^}	31	Riverside, CA	High school swim coach	Big Brother 13	Evicted: Day 34; Evicted: Day 48	9th
Daniele Donato ^{^}	25	Huntington Beach, CA	College student	Big Brother 13	Evicted: Day 55	8th
Jeff Schroeder ^{^}	33	Norridge, IL	Advertising salesman	Big Brother 13	Evicted: Day 55	7th
Shelly Moore	41	Prairieville, LA	Outdoor industry executive	Big Brother 13	Evicted: Day 62	6th
Kalia Booker	30	Los Angeles, CA	Writer	Big Brother 13	Evicted: Day 67	5th
Jordan Lloyd ^{^}	24	Matthews, NC	Waitress	Big Brother 13	Evicted: Day 69	4th
Adam Poch	39	Hoboken, NJ	Music inventory manager	Big Brother 13	Evicted: Day 75	3rd
Porsche Briggs	23	Miami Beach, FL	VIP cocktail waitress	Big Brother 13	Finalist: Day 75	2nd
Rachel Reilly ^{^}	26	Las Vegas, NV	Event hostess	Big Brother 13	Finalist: Day 75	1st
Jodi Rollins	42	Calipatria, CA	Restaurant waitress	Big Brother 14	Evicted: Day 1	16th
Kara Monaco	29	Los Angeles, CA	Model	Big Brother 14	Evicted: Day 13	15th
Willie Hantz	34	Dayton, TX	Tankerman	Big Brother 14	Expelled: Day 14	14th
Josephine "JoJo" Spatafora	26	Staten Island, NY	Bartender	Big Brother 14	Evicted: Day 20	13th
Janelle Pierzina ^{◊}	32	Lakeville, MN	Stay-at-home mom	Big Brother 14	Evicted: Day 34	12th
William "Wil" Heuser	24	Louisville, KY	Marketing consultant	Big Brother 14	Evicted: Day 41	11th
Mike "Boogie" Malin ^{◊}	41	Los Angeles, CA	Restaurateur	Big Brother 14	Evicted: Day 48	10th
Ashley Iocco	26	West Hollywood, CA	Entrepreneur	Big Brother 14	Evicted: Day 48	9th
Britney Haynes ^{^}	24	Tulsa, OK	Pharmaceutical sales representative	Big Brother 14	Evicted: Day 55	8th
Franklin "Frank" Eudy	28	Naples, FL	Unemployed	Big Brother 14	Evicted: Day 62	7th
Joseph "Joe" Arvin	41	Schererville, IN	Chef	Big Brother 14	Evicted: Day 62	6th
Jennifer "Jenn" Arroyo	37	Brooklyn, NY	Musician	Big Brother 14	Evicted: Day 67	5th
Shane Meaney	26	Bennington, VT	House flipper	Big Brother 14	Evicted: Day 69	4th
Danielle Murphree	23	Tuscaloosa, AL	Nurse	Big Brother 14	Evicted: Day 75	3rd
Dan Gheesling ^{^}	28	West Bloomfield, MI	Catholic high school teacher	Big Brother 14	Finalist: Day 75	2nd
Ian Terry	21	New Orleans, LA	Engineering student	Big Brother 14	Finalist: Day 75	1st
David Girton	25	San Diego, CA	Lifeguard	Big Brother 15	Evicted: Day 13	16th
Nick Uhas	28	New York City, NY	Entrepreneur	Big Brother 15	Evicted: Day 21	15th
Jeremy McGuire	23	Katy, TX	Boat shop associate	Big Brother 15	Evicted: Day 28	14th
Kaitlin Barnaby	23	Minneapolis, MN	Bartender	Big Brother 15	Evicted: Day 35	13th
Howard Overby	29	Hattiesburg, MS	Youth counselor	Big Brother 15	Evicted: Day 42	12th
Candice Stewart	29	Houston, TX	Pediatric speech therapist	Big Brother 15	Evicted: Day 49	11th
Jessie Kowalski	25	San Antonio, TX	Unemployed	Big Brother 15	Evicted: Day 56	10th
Helen Kim	37	Chicago, IL	Political consultant	Big Brother 15	Evicted: Day 63	9th
Aaryn Gries	22	San Marcos, TX	College student	Big Brother 15	Evicted: Day 70	8th
Amanda Zuckerman	28	Boynton Beach, FL	Real estate agent	Big Brother 15	Evicted: Day 77	7th
Elissa Slater	27	Kannapolis, NC	Nutritionist	Big Brother 15	Evicted: Day 77	6th
Judd Daughtery	26	Etowah, TN	Property appraiser	Big Brother 15	Evicted: Day 49; Evicted: Day 82	5th
McCrae Olson	23	Oak Grove, MN	Pizza delivery boy	Big Brother 15	Evicted: Day 84	4th
Spencer Clawson	31	Conway, AR	Railroad conductor	Big Brother 15	Evicted: Day 90	3rd
Gina-Marie Zimmerman	32	Staten Island, NY	Pageant coordinator	Big Brother 15	Finalist: Day 90	2nd
Andy Herren	26	Chicago, IL	College professor	Big Brother 15	Finalist: Day 90	1st
Joanna "Joey" Van Pelt	27	Seattle, WA	Makeup artist	Big Brother 16	Evicted: Day 14	16th
Paola Shea	27	Astoria, NY	DJ	Big Brother 16	Evicted: Day 21	15th
Devin Shepherd	26	San Antonio, TX	Motorcycle sales manager	Big Brother 16	Evicted: Day 28	14th
Brittany Martinez	29	Torrance, CA	Event coordinator	Big Brother 16	Evicted: Day 35	13th
Amber Borzotra	26	Knoxville, TN	Esthetician	Big Brother 16	Evicted: Day 42	12th
Jocasta Odom	33	Lovejoy, GA	Minister	Big Brother 16	Evicted: Day 49	11th
Hayden Voss	21	Long Beach, CA	Pedicab driver	Big Brother 16	Evicted: Day 49	10th
Zachary "Zach" Rance	23	Palm Beach, FL	College graduate	Big Brother 16	Evicted: Day 63	9th
Donald "Donny" Thompson	42	Albemarle, NC	Groundskeeper	Big Brother 16	Evicted: Day 70	8th
Nicole Franzel	21	Ubly, MI	Nursing graduate	Big Brother 16	Evicted: Day 56; Evicted: Day 77	7th
Christine Brecht	23	Tucson, AZ	Barista	Big Brother 16	Evicted: Day 77	6th
Frankie Grande	31	New York City, NY	YouTube personality	Big Brother 16	Evicted: Day 88	5th
Caleb Reynolds	26	Hopkinsville, KY	Adventure hunting guide	Big Brother 16	Evicted: Day 90	4th
Victoria Rafaeli	22	Weston, FL	Photographer	Big Brother 16	Evicted: Day 97	3rd
Cody Calafiore	23	Howell, NJ	Sales account executive	Big Brother 16	Finalist: Day 97	2nd
Derrick Levasseur	30	Providence, RI	Police officer	Big Brother 16	Finalist: Day 97	1st
Jason "Jace" Agolli	23	Venice Beach, CA	Personal trainer	Big Brother 17	Evicted: Day 15	17th
Da'Vonne Rogers	27	Los Angeles, CA	Poker dealer	Big Brother 17	Evicted: Day 22	16th
Jeffrey "Jeff" Weldon	27	Tampa, FL	Account executive	Big Brother 17	Evicted: Day 29	15th
Audrey Middleton	25	Villa Rica, GA	Digital media consultant	Big Brother 17	Evicted: Day 36	14th
Jason Roy	25	Swansea, MA	Supermarket cashier	Big Brother 17	Evicted: Day 43	13th
Clayton "Clay" Honeycutt	23	College Station, TX	Graduate student	Big Brother 17	Evicted: Day 50	12th
Melissa "Shelli" Poole	33	Atlanta, GA	Interior designer	Big Brother 17	Evicted: Day 57	11th
Jacklyn "Jackie" Ibarra	28	Las Vegas, NV	Professional dancer	Big Brother 17	Evicted: Day 57	10th
Rebecca "Becky" Burgess	26	Denver, CO	Retail manager	Big Brother 17	Evicted: Day 64	9th
Meaghan "Meg" Maley	25	New York City, NY	Server	Big Brother 17	Evicted: Day 78	8th
James Huling	31	Wichita Falls, TX	Retail associate	Big Brother 17	Evicted: Day 78	7th
Julia Nolan	23	Miami, FL	Marketing intern	Big Brother 17	Evicted: Day 85	6th
Austin Matelson	30	Woodland Hills, CA	Professional wrestler	Big Brother 17	Evicted: Day 89	5th
John "Johnny Mac" McGuire	27	Scranton, PA	Dentist	Big Brother 17	Evicted: Day 71; Evicted: Day 91	4th
Vanessa Rousso	32	Las Vegas, NV	Poker player	Big Brother 17	Evicted: Day 98	3rd
Elizabeth "Liz" Nolan	23	Miami, FL	Marketing coordinator	Big Brother 17	Finalist: Day 98	2nd
Steve Moses	22	Gouverneur, NY	College student	Big Brother 17	Finalist: Day 98	1st
Glenn Garcia	50	Bronx, NY	Dog groomer	Big Brother 18	Evicted: Day 2	16th
Jozea Flores	25	Los Angeles, CA	Make-up artist	Big Brother 18	Evicted: Day 16	15th
Bronte D'Acquisto	26	Denver, CO	Student	Big Brother 18	Evicted: Day 30	14th
Tiffany Rousso	32	Palm Beach Gardens, FL	High school teacher	Big Brother 18	Evicted: Day 37	13th
Frank Eudy ^{^}	32	Charlotte, NC	Medical sales representative	Big Brother 18	Evicted: Day 44	12th
Da'Vonne Rogers ^{^}	28	Lancaster, CA	Poker dealer	Big Brother 18	Evicted: Day 51	11th
Zakiyah Everette	24	Charlotte, NC	Preschool teacher	Big Brother 18	Evicted: Day 58	10th
Bridgette Dunning	24	Ventura, CA	Traveling nurse	Big Brother 18	Evicted: Day 58	9th
Paul "Paulie" Calafiore	27	Howell, NJ	DJ	Big Brother 18	Evicted: Day 65	8th
Michelle Meyer	23	Washington Township, MI	Nutritionist	Big Brother 18	Evicted: Day 79	7th
Natalie Negrotti	26	Franklin Park, NJ	Event coordinator	Big Brother 18	Evicted: Day 86	6th
Victor Arroyo	25	Slidell, LA	Gym manager	Big Brother 18	Evicted: Day 23; Evicted: Day 72; Evicted: Day 90	5th
Corey Brooks	25	Dallas, TX	Baseball coach	Big Brother 18	Evicted: Day 92	4th
James Huling ^{^}	32	Wichita Falls, TX	Staff recruiter	Big Brother 18	Evicted: Day 99	3rd
Paul Abrahamian	23	Tarzana, CA	Clothing designer	Big Brother 18	Finalist: Day 99	2nd
Nicole Franzel ^{^}	24	Ubly, MI	ER nurse	Big Brother 18	Finalist: Day 99	1st
Cameron Heard	24	Woodridge, IL	Microbiologist	Big Brother 19	Evicted: Day 1	17th
Megan Lowder	28	Phoenix, AZ	Dog walker	Big Brother 19	Walked: Day 8	16th
Jillian Parker	24	Las Vegas, NV	Timeshare sales representative	Big Brother 19	Evicted: Day 16	15th
Dominique Cooper	30	Woodbridge, VA	Government engineer	Big Brother 19	Evicted: Day 30	14th
Ramses Soto	21	Grand Rapids, MI	Cosplay artist	Big Brother 19	Evicted: Day 37	13th
Jessica Graf	26	Cranston, RI	VIP concierge	Big Brother 19	Evicted: Day 51	12th
Cody Nickson	32	Plano, TX	Construction sales representative	Big Brother 19	Evicted: Day 23; Evicted: Day 58	11th
Elena Davies	26	Dallas, TX	Radio personality	Big Brother 19	Evicted: Day 58	10th
Mark Jansen	26	Grand Island, NY	Personal trainer	Big Brother 19	Evicted: Day 65	9th
Matthew "Matt" Clines	33	Arlington, VA	Renovation consultant	Big Brother 19	Evicted: Day 72	8th
Jason Dent	37	Humeston, IA	Rodeo clown	Big Brother 19	Evicted: Day 79	7th
Raven Walton	23	DeValls Bluff, AR	Dance teacher	Big Brother 19	Evicted: Day 79	6th
Alexandra "Alex" Ow	28	Camarillo, CA	Eco-friendly marketing representative	Big Brother 19	Evicted: Day 84	5th
Kevin Schlehuber	55	Boston, MA	Stay-at-home dad	Big Brother 19	Evicted: Day 86	4th
Christmas Abbott	35	Raleigh, NC	Fitness superstar	Big Brother 19	Evicted: Day 92	3rd
Paul Abrahamian ^{^}	24	Tarzana, CA	Clothing designer	Big Brother 19	Finalist: Day 92	2nd
Josh Martinez	23	Homestead, FL	Haircare sales	Big Brother 19	Finalist: Day 92	1st
Steve Arienta	40	Wanaque, NJ	Former undercover cop	Big Brother 20	Evicted: Day 16	16th
Christopher "Swaggy C" Williams	23	Bridgeport, CT	Day trader	Big Brother 20	Evicted: Day 23	15th
Winston Hines	28	Somerset, KY	Medical sales representative	Big Brother 20	Evicted: Day 30	14th
Kaitlyn Herman	24	Encino, CA	Life coach	Big Brother 20	Evicted: Day 37	13th
Rachel Swindler	29	Las Vegas, NV	Las Vegas entertainer	Big Brother 20	Evicted: Day 44	12th
Bayleigh Dayton	25	Lee's Summit, MO	Flight attendant	Big Brother 20	Evicted: Day 51	11th
Angie "Rockstar" Lantry	34	Columbia, MD	Stay-at-home mom	Big Brother 20	Evicted: Day 58	10th
Faysal "Fessy" Shafaat	26	Orlando, FL	Substitute teacher	Big Brother 20	Evicted: Day 72	9th
Scott "Scottie" Salton	26	Chicago, IL	Shipping manager	Big Brother 20	Evicted: Day 65; Evicted: Day 79	8th
Haleigh Broucher	21	Village Mills, TX	College student	Big Brother 20	Evicted: Day 86	7th
Brett Robinson	25	Charlestown, MA	Cybersecurity engineer	Big Brother 20	Evicted: Day 86	6th
Samantha "Sam" Bledsoe	27	Stuarts Draft, VA	Welder	Big Brother 20	Evicted: Day 91	5th
Angela Rummans	26	Playa Vista, CA	Fitness model	Big Brother 20	Evicted: Day 93	4th
Joseph Charles "JC" Mounduix	25	West Hollywood, CA	Professional dancer	Big Brother 20	Evicted: Day 99	3rd
Tyler Crispen	23	Hilton Head Island, SC	Lifeguard	Big Brother 20	Finalist: Day 99	2nd
Kaycee Clark	30	San Diego, CA	Pro-football player	Big Brother 20	Finalist: Day 99	1st

== Seasons 21–present (2019–present) ==
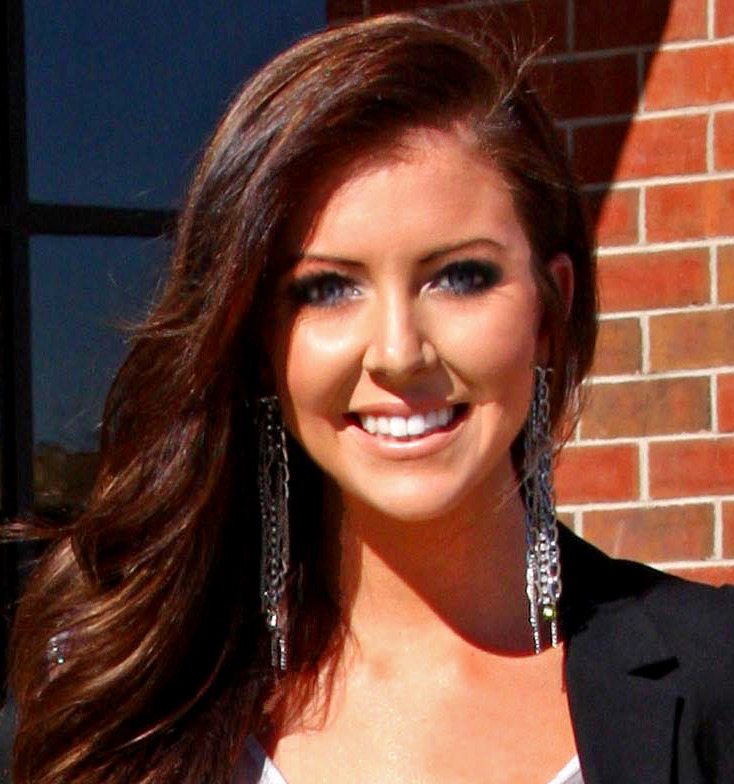
Holly Allen, Big Brother 21

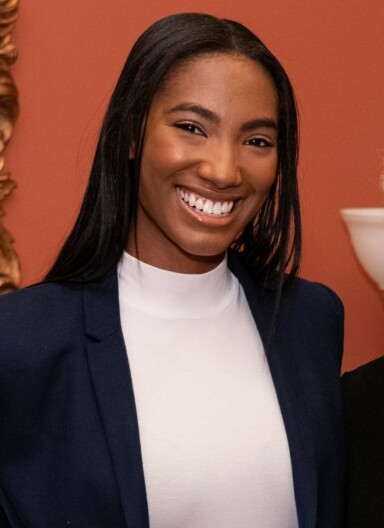
Taylor Hale, Big Brother 24 and Big Brother Reindeer Games

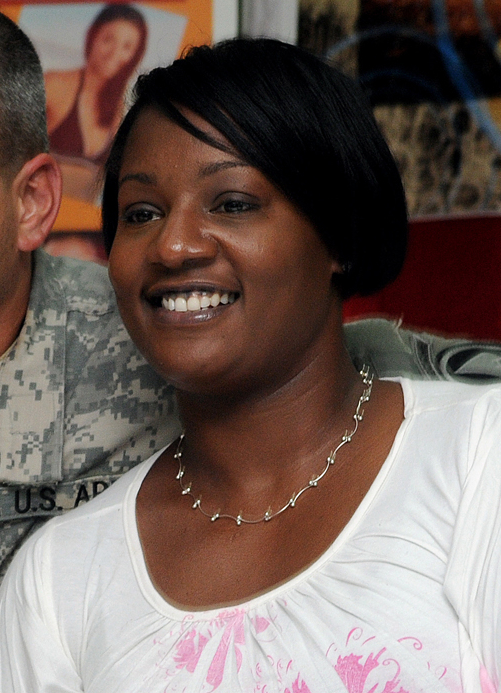
Cirie Fields, Big Brother 25

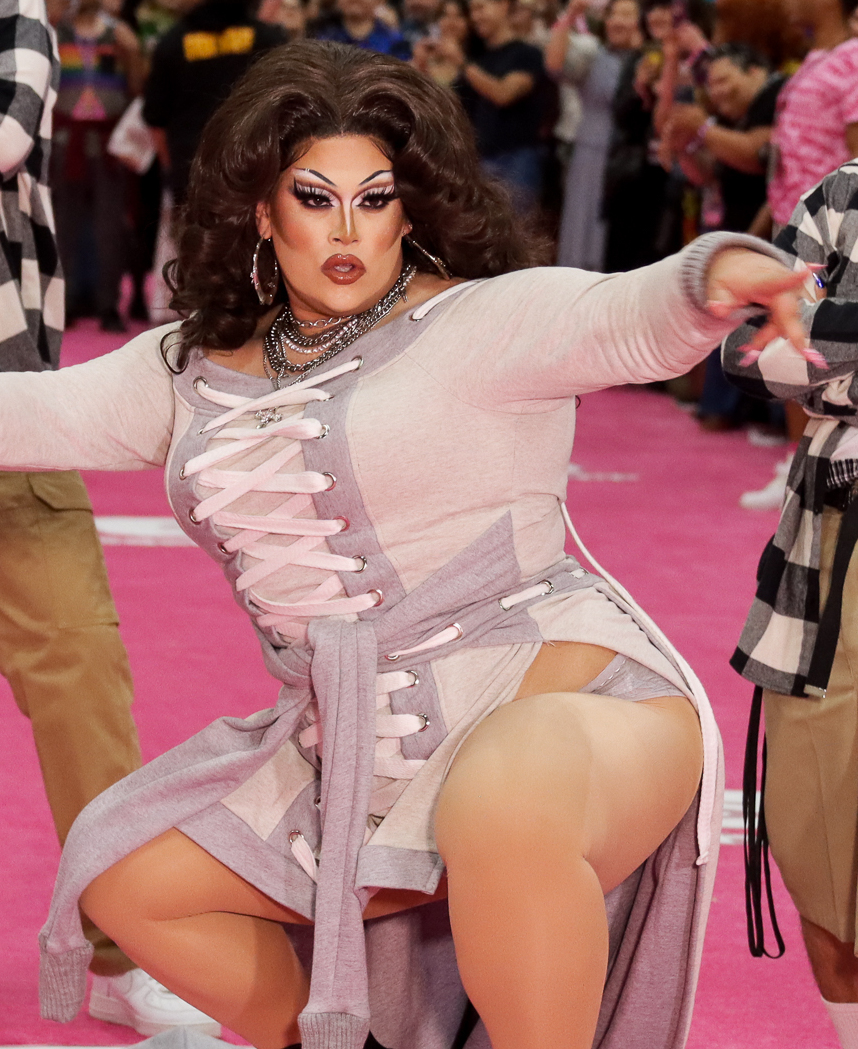
Jason De Puy, Big Brother 28

Name	Age^{[I]}	Hometown^{[II]}	Profession	Season	Status	Finish
David Alexander	29	Atlanta, GA	Photographer	Big Brother 21	Evicted: Day 1	16th
Ovi Kabir	22	Oak Ridge, TN	College student	Big Brother 21	Evicted: Day 15	15th
Olukemi "Kemi" Fakunle	25	Elkridge, MD	Marketing strategist	Big Brother 21	Evicted: Day 23	14th
Isabella Wang	22	Mount Olive, NJ	Public health analyst	Big Brother 21	Evicted: Day 37	13th
Samuel "Sam" Smith	31	Mountain Top, PA	Truck driver	Big Brother 21	Evicted: Day 44	12th
John "Jack" Matthews	28	Tampa, FL	Fitness trainer	Big Brother 21	Evicted: Day 51	11th
Kathryn Dunn	29	Irving, TX	Digital marketing executive	Big Brother 21	Evicted: Day 58	10th
Analyse Talavera	22	Simi Valley, CA	College soccer star	Big Brother 21	Evicted: Day 65	9th
Nicholas "Nick" Maccarone	27	Sewell, NJ	Therapist	Big Brother 21	Evicted: Day 72	8th
Jessica Milagros	37	Oak Park, IL	Plus-size model	Big Brother 21	Evicted: Day 79	7th
Christie Murphy	28	Keyport, NJ	Boutique owner	Big Brother 21	Evicted: Day 79	6th
Tommy Bracco	28	Staten Island, NY	Broadway dancer	Big Brother 21	Evicted: Day 86	5th
Cliff Hogg III	54	Houston, TX	Petroleum engineer	Big Brother 21	Evicted: Day 30; Evicted: Day 93	4th
Nicole Anthony	24	Long Island, NY	Preschool aide	Big Brother 21	Evicted: Day 99	3rd
Holly Allen	31	Lander, WY	Wine safari guide	Big Brother 21	Finalist: Day 99	2nd
Jackson Michie	24	Nashville, TN	Server	Big Brother 21	Finalist: Day 99	1st
Keesha Smith ^{^}	42	Malibu, CA	Waitress	Big Brother 22 (All-Stars)	Evicted: Day 9	16th
Nicole Anthony ^{^}	25	Long Island, NY	Podcast host	Big Brother 22 (All-Stars)	Evicted: Day 16	15th
Janelle Pierzina ^{†}	40	Edina, MN	Real estate agent	Big Brother 22 (All-Stars)	Evicted: Day 23	14th
Kaysar Ridha ^{◊}	39	Irvine, CA	Biotech executive	Big Brother 22 (All-Stars)	Evicted: Day 30	13th
Bayleigh Dayton-Williams ^{^}	27	Kansas City, MO	Model	Big Brother 22 (All-Stars)	Evicted: Day 37	12th
Ian Terry ^{^}	29	Houston, TX	Management consultant	Big Brother 22 (All-Stars)	Evicted: Day 44	11th
Da'Vonne Rogers ^{◊}	32	Inglewood, CA	Acting coach	Big Brother 22 (All-Stars)	Evicted: Day 51	10th
Kevin Campbell ^{^}	40	San Diego, CA	Ad agency executive	Big Brother 22 (All-Stars)	Evicted: Day 58	9th
David Alexander ^{^}	30	Atlanta, GA	Senior sales rep	Big Brother 22 (All-Stars)	Evicted: Day 58	8th
Daniele "Dani" Briones ^{◊}	33	Orange County, CA	Stay-at-home mom	Big Brother 22 (All-Stars)	Evicted: Day 58	7th
Tyler Crispen ^{^}	25	Hilton Head Island, SC	Jewelry company executive	Big Brother 22 (All-Stars)	Evicted: Day 65	6th
Robert "Memphis" Garrett ^{^}	37	Collierville, TN	Restaurateur	Big Brother 22 (All-Stars)	Evicted: Day 72	5th
Christmas Abbott ^{^}	38	Raleigh, NC	Fitness entrepreneur	Big Brother 22 (All-Stars)	Evicted: Day 79	4th
Nicole Franzel ^{◊}	28	Ubly, MI	Social Media influencer	Big Brother 22 (All-Stars)	Evicted: Day 85	3rd
Vincenzo "Enzo" Palumbo ^{^}	42	Bayonne, NJ	Insurance adjuster	Big Brother 22 (All-Stars)	Finalist: Day 85	2nd
Cody Calafiore ^{^}	29	Howell, NJ	Soccer coach	Big Brother 22 (All-Stars)	Finalist: Day 85	1st
Travis Long	22	Honolulu, HI	Technology sales consultant	Big Brother 23	Evicted: Day 9	16th
Brandon "Frenchie" French	34	Clarksville, TN	Farmer	Big Brother 23	Evicted: Day 16	15th
Brent Champagne	28	Cranston, RI	Flight attendant	Big Brother 23	Evicted: Day 23	14th
Whitney Williams	30	Portland, OR	Make-up artist	Big Brother 23	Evicted: Day 30	13th
Christian Birkenberger	23	Harwinton, CT	General contractor assistant	Big Brother 23	Evicted: Day 37	12th
Britini D'Angelo	24	Niagara Falls, NY	Kindergarten teacher	Big Brother 23	Evicted: Day 44	11th
Derek Xiao	24	New York City, NY	Start-up founder	Big Brother 23	Evicted: Day 51	10th
Sarah Beth Steagall	27	Fort Myers, FL	Forensic scientist	Big Brother 23	Evicted: Day 58	9th
Claire Rehfuss	25	New York City, NY	AI technical architect	Big Brother 23	Evicted: Day 65	8th
Alyssa Lopez	24	Sarasota, FL	Swimwear designer	Big Brother 23	Evicted: Day 65	7th
Tiffany Mitchell	40	Detroit, MI	Phlebotomist	Big Brother 23	Evicted: Day 72	6th
Hannah Chaddha	21	Chicago, IL	Graduate student	Big Brother 23	Evicted: Day 72	5th
Kyland Young	29	Venice Beach, CA	Account executive	Big Brother 23	Evicted: Day 79	4th
Azah Awasum	30	Baltimore, MD	Sales operations director	Big Brother 23	Evicted: Day 85	3rd
Derek Frazier	29	Philadelphia, PA	Safety officer	Big Brother 23	Finalist: Day 85	2nd
Xavier Prather	27	Milwaukee, WI	Attorney	Big Brother 23	Finalist: Day 85	1st
Paloma Aguilar	22	San Marcos, CA	Interior designer	Big Brother 24	Walked: Day 8	16th
Joe "Pooch" Pucciarelli	24	Boca Raton, FL	Assistant football coach	Big Brother 24	Evicted: Day 16	15th
Ameerah Jones	31	Westminster, MD	Content designer	Big Brother 24	Evicted: Day 23	14th
Nicole Layog	41	Fort Lauderdale, FL	Private chef	Big Brother 24	Evicted: Day 30	13th
Daniel Durston	35	Las Vegas, NV	Vegas performer	Big Brother 24	Evicted: Day 37	12th
Indiana "Indy" Santos	31	Los Angeles, CA	Corporate flight attendant	Big Brother 24	Evicted: Day 44	11th
Jasmine Davis	29	Atlanta, GA	Entrepreneur	Big Brother 24	Evicted: Day 51	10th
Joseph Abdin	24	Lake Worth, FL	Lawyer	Big Brother 24	Evicted: Day 51	9th
Kyle Capener	29	Bountiful, UT	Unemployed	Big Brother 24	Evicted: Day 58	8th
Terrance Higgins	47	Chicago, IL	Bus operator	Big Brother 24	Evicted: Day 65	7th
Michael Bruner	28	Rochester, MN	Attorney	Big Brother 24	Evicted: Day 65	6th
Alyssa Snider	24	Sarasota, FL	Marketing representative	Big Brother 24	Evicted: Day 72	5th
Brittany Hoopes	32	Austin, TX	Hypnotherapist	Big Brother 24	Evicted: Day 79	4th
Matthew Turner	23	New Bedford, MA	Thrift store owner	Big Brother 24	Evicted: Day 82	3rd
Monte Taylor	27	Bear, DE	Personal trainer	Big Brother 24	Finalist: Day 82	2nd
Taylor Hale	27	West Bloomfield, MI	Personal stylist	Big Brother 24	Finalist: Day 82	1st
Luke Valentine	30	Coral Springs, FL	Illustrator	Big Brother 25	Expelled: Day 8	17th
Kirsten Elwin	25	Houston, TX	Molecular biologist	Big Brother 25	Evicted: Day 9	16th
Reilly Smedley	24	Nashville, TN	Bartender	Big Brother 25	Evicted: Day 16	15th
Hisam Goueli	45	Seattle, WA	Geriatric physician	Big Brother 25	Evicted: Day 23	14th
Michael "Red" Utley	37	Gatlinburg, TN	Moonshine distiller	Big Brother 25	Evicted: Day 37	13th
Isabel "Izzy" Gleicher	32	New York City, NY	Professional flutist	Big Brother 25	Evicted: Day 44	12th
Jared Fields	25	Norwalk, CT	Exterminator	Big Brother 25	Evicted: Day 51	11th
Mecole Hayes	30	Upper Marlboro, MD	Political consultant	Big Brother 25	Evicted: Day 65	10th
Cameron Hardin	34	Eastman, GA	Stay-at-home father	Big Brother 25	Evicted: Day 51; Evicted: Day 72	9th
Cory Wurtenberger	21	Weston, FL	College student	Big Brother 25	Evicted: Day 79	8th
Blue Kim	25	New York City, NY	Brand strategist	Big Brother 25	Evicted: Day 86	7th
America Lopez	27	Edinburg, TX	Medical receptionist	Big Brother 25	Evicted: Day 86	6th
Cirie Fields	53	Walterboro, SC	Surgical director	Big Brother 25	Evicted: Day 93	5th
Felicia Cannon	63	Kennesaw, GA	Real estate agent	Big Brother 25	Evicted: Day 96	4th
Bowie Jane Ball	45	Melbourne, Australia	Barrister/DJ	Big Brother 25	Evicted: Day 100	3rd
Matthew "Matt" Klotz	27	Baton Rouge, LA	Deaflympics swimmer	Big Brother 25	Finalist: Day 100	2nd
Jagateshwar "Jag" Bains	25	Omak, WA	Truck company owner	Big Brother 25	Evicted: Day 30; Finalist: Day 100	1st
Matt Hardeman	25	Roswell, GA	Tech sales rep	Big Brother 26	Evicted: Day 10	16th
Lisa Weintraub	33	Los Angeles, CA	Celebrity chef	Big Brother 26	Evicted: Day 17	15th
Kenney Kelley	52	Boston, MA	Former undercover cop	Big Brother 26	Evicted: Day 24	14th
Cedric Hodges	21	Boise, ID	Former Marine	Big Brother 26	Evicted: Day 31	13th
Brooklyn Rivera	34	Dallas, TX	Business administrator	Big Brother 26	Evicted: Day 38	12th
Tucker Des Lauriers	30	Brooklyn, NY	Marketing/sales executive	Big Brother 26	Evicted: Day 45	11th
Joseph Rodriguez	30	Tampa, FL	Video store clerk	Big Brother 26	Evicted: Day 52	10th
Quinn Martin	25	Omaha, NE	Nurse recruiter	Big Brother 26	Evicted: Day 59	9th
T'kor Clottey	23	Atlanta, GA	Crochet business owner	Big Brother 26	Evicted: Day 66	8th
Leah Peters	26	Miami, FL	VIP cocktail server	Big Brother 26	Evicted: Day 73	7th
Angela Murray	50	Syracuse, UT	Real estate agent	Big Brother 26	Evicted: Day 73	6th
Kimo Apaka	35	Hilo, HI	Mattress sales rep	Big Brother 26	Evicted: Day 80	5th
Rubina Bernabe	35	Los Angeles, CA	Event bartender	Big Brother 26	Evicted: Day 87	4th
Cameron "Cam" Sullivan-Brown	25	Bowie, MD	Physical therapist	Big Brother 26	Evicted: Day 90	3rd
Makensy Manbeck	22	Houston, TX	Construction project manager	Big Brother 26	Finalist: Day 90	2nd
Chelsie Baham	27	Rancho Cucamonga, CA	Nonprofit director	Big Brother 26	Finalist: Day 90	1st
Isaiah "Zae" Frederich	23	Provo, UT	Salesperson	Big Brother 27	Evicted: Day 10	17th
Amy Bingham	43	Stockton, CA	Insurance agent	Big Brother 27	Evicted: Day 17	16th
Adrian Rocha	23	San Antonio, TX	Carpenter	Big Brother 27	Evicted: Day 24	15th
Jimmy Heagerty	25	Washington, DC	Strategy consultant	Big Brother 27	Evicted: Day 31	14th
Zach Cornell	27	Cartersville, GA	Marketing manager	Big Brother 27	Evicted: Day 38	13th
Rylie Jeffries	27	Luther, OK	Professional bull rider	Big Brother 27	Evicted: Day 45	12th
Katherine Woodman	23	Columbia, SC	Fine dining server	Big Brother 27	Evicted: Day 52	11th
Mickey Lee	35	Atlanta, GA	Event curator	Big Brother 27	Evicted: Day 59	10th
Rachel Reilly ^{◊}	40	Hoover, AL	Television personality	Big Brother 27	Eliminated: Day 60	9th
Cliffton "Will" Williams	50	Charlotte, NC	College sports podcaster	Big Brother 27	Evicted: Day 66	8th
Kelley Jorgensen	29	Burbank, SD	Web Designer	Big Brother 27	Evicted: Day 73	7th
Lauren Domingue	22	Lafayette, LA	Bridal stylist	Big Brother 27	Evicted: Day 73	6th
Keanu Soto	33	McKinney, TX	Dungeon Master	Big Brother 27	Evicted: Day 77	5th
Ava Pearl	24	New York City, NY	Aura painter	Big Brother 27	Evicted: Day 80	4th
Morgan Pope	33	Los Angeles, CA	Gamer	Big Brother 27	Evicted: Day 83	3rd
Vince Panaro	34	West Hills, CA	Unemployed	Big Brother 27	Finalist: Day 83	2nd
Ashley Hollis	25	New York City, NY	Attorney	Big Brother 27	Finalist: Day 83	1st
Ashley Trail	24	Chicago, IL	Bartender	Big Brother 28	Evicted: Day 10	17th
Jack "Rome" Seymour	28	Traverse City, MI	Pickleball coach	Big Brother 28	Evicted: Day 17	16th
Jason De Puy	35	Los Angeles, CA	Drag queen	Big Brother 28	Evicted: Day 24	15th
Lyric Medeiros	25	Honolulu, HI	Attorney	Big Brother 28	Evicted: Day 31	14th
Chukwuemeka "Chuk" Anyanwu	27	Dallas, TX	Supply chain analyst	Big Brother 28	Evicted: Day 38	13th
Kamuela "Kamu" Kirk	32	Phoenix, AZ	MMA fighter	Big Brother 28	Evicted: Day 45	12th
Mallory Aurichio	24	Washington Township, Bergen County, NJ	Rocket scientist	Big Brother 28	Evicted: Day 52	11th
Haley Thogmartin	29	Wildwood, MO	Telemedicine executive	Big Brother 28	Evicted: Day 53	10th
La Trice Verrett	57	Maplewood, NJ	Boutique salesperson	Big Brother 28	Evicted: Day 59	9th
Angela Murray ^{^}	52	Syracuse, UT	Real estate agent	Big Brother 28	Evicted: Day 66	8th
Barrett Pfeiffer	27	Austin, TX	Jumbotron engineer	Big Brother 28	Evicted: Day 73	7th
Yash Patel	24	Monroe Township, Middlesex County, NJ	Finance analyst	Big Brother 28	Evicted: Day 73	6th
Melody Morris	24	Phoenix, AZ	Corporate game show host	Big Brother 28	Evicted: Day 77	5th
Dianelys "Dee" Valladares	29	Miami, FL	Entrepreneur	Big Brother 28	Evicted: Day 80	4th
Drew Campbell	22	Temecula, CA	Surgical dental assistant	Big Brother 28	Evicted: Day 87	3rd
Taylor Brown	27	Deerfield Beach, FL	School counselor	Big Brother 28	Finalist: Day 87	2nd
Rick Devens	42	Macon, GA	News anchor	Big Brother 28	Finalist: Day 87	1st

== Special editions (2016, 2023) ==
Name	Age^{[I]}	Hometown^{[II]}	Profession	Series	Status	Finish
Chad Michael "Cornbread" Ligon	41	Augusta, GA	Foreman at tree-removal company	Over the Top	Evicted: Day 8	13th
Monte Massongill	25	Olive Branch, MS	Engineer associate	Over the Top	Evicted: Day 15	12th
Shane Chapman	24	Pisgah Forest, NC	Roofer	Over the Top	Evicted: Day 22	11th
Neeley Jackson	33	Fort Worth, TX	Sales associate	Over the Top	Evicted: Day 29	10th
Scott Dennis	24	Bangor, ME	Debt collector	Over the Top	Evicted: Day 36	9th
Alexandra "Alex" Willett	25	Dallas, TX	Animation designer	Over the Top	Evicted: Day 43	8th
Whitney Hogg	21	Whitesburg, KY	Medical assistant	Over the Top	Evicted: Day 43	7th
Danielle Lickey	23	Visalia, CA	Preschool teacher	Over the Top	Evicted: Day 50	6th
Shelby Stockton	24	Simi Valley, CA	Law school graduate	Over the Top	Evicted: Day 57	5th
Justin Duncan	27	New Orleans, LA	Restaurant Owner	Over the Top	Evicted: Day 63	4th
Krystina "Kryssie" Ridolfi	31	Schaumburg, IL	Waitress	Over the Top	Finalist: Day 65	3rd
Jason Roy ^{^}	27	Swansea, MA	Grocery clerk	Over the Top	Finalist: Day 65	2nd
Morgan Willett	22	Austin, TX	Publicist	Over the Top	Finalist: Day 65	1st
Cameron Hardin ^{^}	34	Eastman, GA	Stay-at-home father	Reindeer Games	Eliminated: Episode 1	9th
Cody Calafiore ^{◊}	32	Howell, NJ	Software sales rep	Reindeer Games	Eliminated: Episode 2	8th
Danielle Hendricks ^{◊}	51	San Francisco, CA	Real estate manager	Reindeer Games	Eliminated: Episode 3	7th
Josh Martinez ^{^}	29	Miami, FL	Content creator	Reindeer Games	Eliminated: Episode 4	6th
Britney Godwin ^{◊}	36	Tulsa, OK	Real estate agent	Reindeer Games	Eliminated: Episode 5	5th
Xavier Prather ^{^}	29	Milwaukee, WI	Attorney	Reindeer Games	Finalist: Episode 6	4th
Frankie Grande ^{^}	40	Los Angeles, CA	Actor	Reindeer Games	Finalist: Episode 6	3rd
Taylor Hale ^{^}	28	Detroit, MI	Motivational speaker	Reindeer Games	Finalist: Episode 6	2nd
Nicole Franzel-Arroyo ^{†}	31	Ubly, MI	Boutique owner	Reindeer Games	Finalist: Episode 6	1st

^{^[I]} Contestant's age at the start of the season.
^{^[II]} U.S. state abbreviations can be found here.
