= Marcellas Reynolds =

American television personality

- Reynolds in 2010
- Born: November 11, 1969 (age 57)
- Television: Big Brother 3

Marcellas Reynolds (born November 11, 1969) is an American actor, author, documentarian, and television host.

His notable television appearances include GMA3, Access Hollywood, E! Live from the Red Carpet, The Bold and the Beautiful, Supreme Models, and Yes, Dear. He began his television career in 2002 on CBS's hit television series Big Brother season 3, becoming the first openly gay black man cast on a major network reality series. His writing has appeared in Chicago magazine, Essence, The Guardian, and L.A. Style Magazine.

Reynolds is the author of Supreme Models: Iconic Black Women Who Revolutionized Fashion and Supreme Actresses: Iconic Black Women Who Revolutionized Hollywood, Supreme Sirens: Iconic Black Women Who Revolutionized Music, and the executive producer of Supreme Models, a documentary.

== Personal life ==
Reynolds was born in Chicago, Illinois, and raised in Chicago's South Shore. He graduated from Kenwood Academy and briefly attended the University of Illinois Chicago's Circle campus.

== Career ==
In 1995, Aria Model and Talent owners Marie Anderson and Mary Boncher discovered Reynolds while waiting tables. Represented during his model career by Ford Models, Beatrice Models in Milan, and Goodfellas Model Agency in London, Reynolds modeled for the GAP, Ralph Lauren, Tommy Hilfiger, Nautica, and photographers Norman Jean Roy and Bruce Weber.

In 2000, while modeling in New York, Marcellas Reynolds began working as a fashion stylist for H&M, Kohl's, Lord & Taylor, and Macy's. His editorial work has appeared in British GQ, InStyle, and British Vogue. His list of past clientele includes Rebecca Hall, Jayma Mays, David Schwimmer, Sharon Stone, and Justin Timberlake.

In 2002, after his appearance on CBS's Big Brother season three, Reynolds began his career as an entertainment reporter and television host working for BET, CBS, E!, FOX, and the Style Network. His celebrity interviews include Miss America 2019 Nia Franklin, Brad Garrett, Tyrese Gibson, Beverly Johnson, Daphne Maxwell Reid, Debra Messing, Lupita Nyong'o, Issa Rae, and Gabrielle Union.

Reynolds's early television appearances include BET's Remixed, CBS This Morning, CNN Newsroom, E! Network's E! Live from the Red Carpet, Perfect Catch, Style Network's How Do I Look? and Style Star, The Tyra Banks Show, and Yes, Dear. In 2005, Reynolds appeared as Micah Okwu on CBS's daytime soap opera, The Bold and the Beautiful. Reynolds also has a cameo in the 2009 movie Eating Out 3: All You Can Eat.

Reynolds has appeared in Access Hollywood, Daily Mail TV, Good Day Chicago, Tamron Hall, Watch What Happens Live with Andy Cohen, and Good Day L.A. In 2018 Reynolds appeared on The Good Place as Tahani's favorite patissier, and in 2019, Reynolds appeared on How to Get Away with Murder as a corrupt FBI agent.

On October 8, 2019, Reynolds published Supreme Models: Iconic Black Women Who Revolutionized Fashion, an art book about black models. In 2020, Essence named Supreme Models "The Number One Book on Black Style."

In 2021, Reynolds published his second book, Supreme Actresses: Iconic Black Women Who Revolutionized Hollywood, a collection of photographs, interviews, and profiles of Black actresses. Town and Country Magazine named it "One of October 2021's Best Books."

On September 24, 2022, Supreme Models, a six-part Vogue/YouTube Originals documentary series, premiered. Reynolds was co-producer of the series.

Reynolds' third book, Supreme Sirens: Iconic Black Women Who Revolutionized Music, was published in 2024.

== Publications ==
Reynolds, Marcellas. Supreme Models: Iconic Black Women Who Revolutionized Fashion. Illustrated. Abrams, 2019.

Reynolds, Marcellas. Supreme Actresses: Iconic Black Women Who Revolutionized Hollywood. Illustrated, Abrams, 2021.

Reynolds, Marcellas. Supreme Sirens: Iconic Black Women Who Revolutionized Music. Illustrated, Abrams, 2024.

== Filmography ==
Actor (Film)
Year	Title	Role	Type
2004	Twenty Gay Stereotypes Confirmed	#1	Short Film
2009	Eating Out 3: All You Can Eat	Audience Member	Film
2010	POP-u-larity!	Host/Himself	Film

Actor (Television)
Year	Title	Role	No. of episodes
2003	Yes, Dear	Houseguest	1
2005	Black Tie Nights	Waiter	1
2005	The Bold and The Beautiful	Micah Okwu	1
2010	Zane's Sex Chronicoles	Kerrigan's Assistant	2
2013	Desperate Housewives	Gay Confidante	1
2014	Hungry	Casting Director	1
2018	The Good Place	Tahani's Favorite Patissier	1
2019	How to Get Away with Murder	FBI Agent	1

Casting Department
Year	Title	Role
2001	7 Lives Xposed	Casting Associate
2004	Black Tie Nights	Casting Associate
2005	The Two-Timer	Casting Associate
2020	Supermarket Sweep	Casting Associate
2020	Small Fortune	Casting Associate
2021-2022	The Hype	Casting Associate
2021	The Price is Right	Casting Associate
2022	Lizzo's Watch Out for the Big Grrrls	Casting Associate
2023	Raid the Cage	Casting Associate
2024	OMG Fashun	Casting Producer

Executive Producer
Year	Title	No. of episodes
2022	Supreme Models	6

Producer
Year	Title	No. of episodes
2008	Shop Like a Star	3

Self (Television)
Year	Title	Role	No. of episodes
2002	Big Brother	Houseguest / Self	29
2003	Big Brother	Self / Competition Host	2
2005	On Q Live	Host	5
2005–2006	Remixed	Host	13
2006	Big Brother All Stars	Houseguest / Self	23
2006–2007	Reality Remix	Correspondent	8
2007	The Tyra Banks Show	Featured Export	1
2008	Shop Like a Star	Host / Style Expert	3
2008	30 Best and Worst Beach Bodies	Self	
2008	From G's to Gents	Featured Expert	1
2008	US Fashion Rocks	Featured Expert	2
2009	20 Best and Worst Celebrity Plastic Surgery Stories	Self	
2009	The Morning Show with Mike & Juliet	Self	1
2010	Perfect Catch	Host	7
2007–2011	E! Live from the Red Carpet	Self	3
2008–2011	Geraldo Rivera Reports	Self	4
2005–2011	How Do I Look?	Self	12
2011	CNN World News Report	Self	1
2011–2012	Style Star	Self	22
2014	The 16th Minute	Self	
2015	Good Morning Britain	Self	2
2015	Secrets of New York Fashion Week	Self	
2014–2016	The Meredith Vieira Show	Self / Featured Expert	17
2015–2016	Lorraine	Self	2
2017	Million Dollar Matchmaker	Self	1
2017	Daily Mail TV	Self	2
2018	Bossip on WEtv	Entertainment Reporter	8
2019	Tamron Hall	Self	1
2012–2019	Fox 11 News	Self	24
2012–2024	Good Day Chicago	Self	7
2019	Windy City Live	Self	1
2020	Access Hollywood	Self	3
2011–2024	Good Day L.A.	Self	60
2021-2024	Daytime Chicago	Self	3
2022-2024	Daily Blast Live	Self	3
2022-2024	Watch What Happens Live with Andy Cohen	Self	2
2022	Supreme Models	Self	6
2023	Split Second	Self	1
2024	GMA3	Self	1
2024	CBS News KCAL	Self	2
