= Rickshaws in the United States =

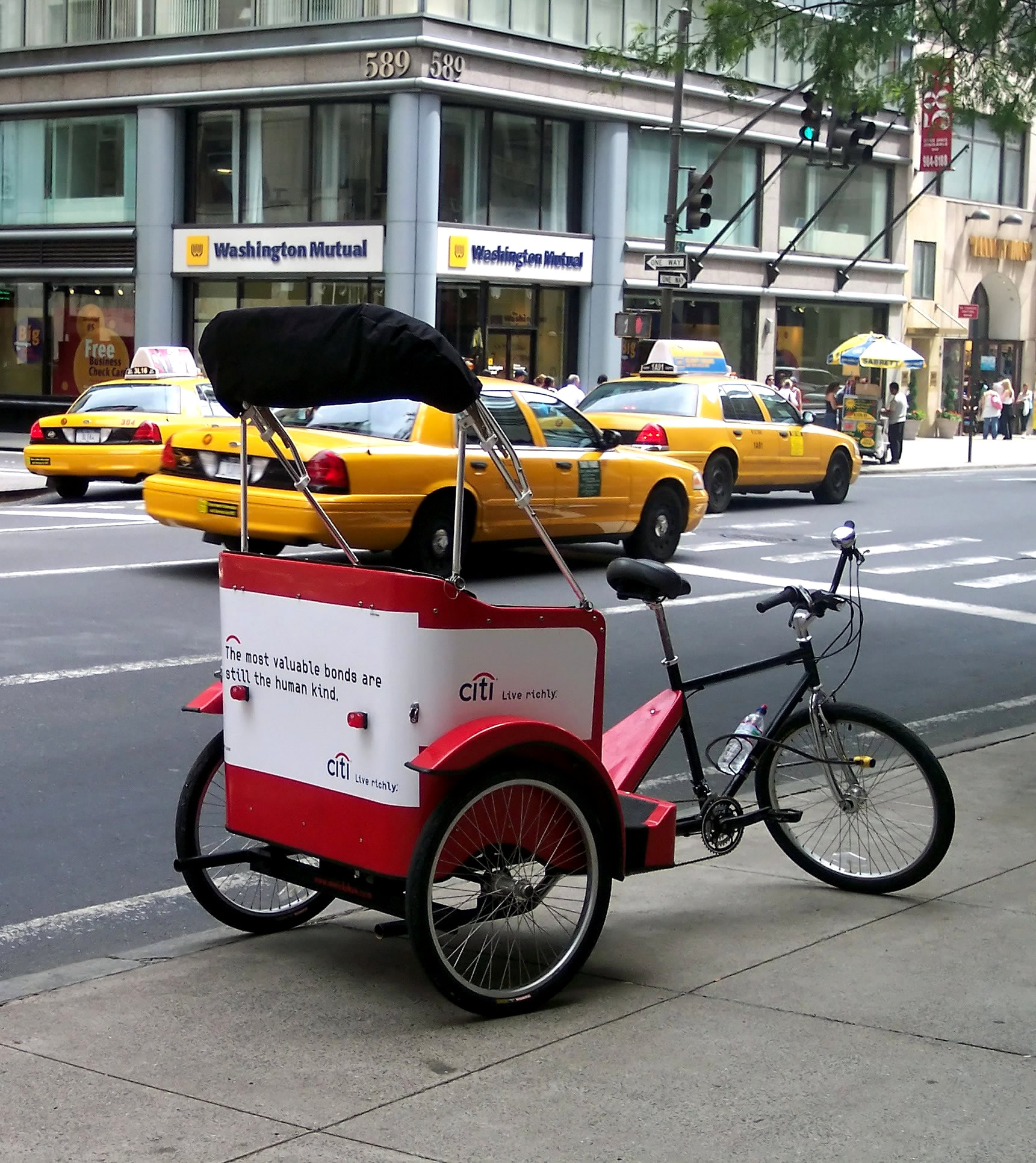
A cycle rickshaw at rest, New York City, New York

Rickshaws are used in numerous cities in the United States, primarily for their novelty value as an entertaining form of transportation for tourists and locals. However, they also have environmental benefits and may be quicker than other forms of transport if traffic congestion is high. Various laws regulate their use in different cities.

== Overview ==
The first known commercial use of pedicabs in North America occurred in 1962 at the Seattle World's Fair. San Diego and New York City each host hundreds of pedicabs; dozens of other United States cities also have pedicab services.

In New York, human powered transport is available as an environmentally friendly means of transit. Local residents in New York City, however, view pedicabs primarily as tourist vehicles due to their high fares and their drivers' aggressive sales pitches to pedestrians. At a rate of $5 plus $1 per block per person, a 20-block (one mile) pedicab ride for two people will cost $50. In a taxicab, the same ride would cost under $10. According to Peter Meitzler of New York's Manhattan Rickshaw Company, a passenger has an entirely different urban experience when one rides in a rickshaw. He says that he uses the word "rickshaw" in his company name because it is internationally known.

== Pedicab availability ==
=== Pedicabs in operation ===
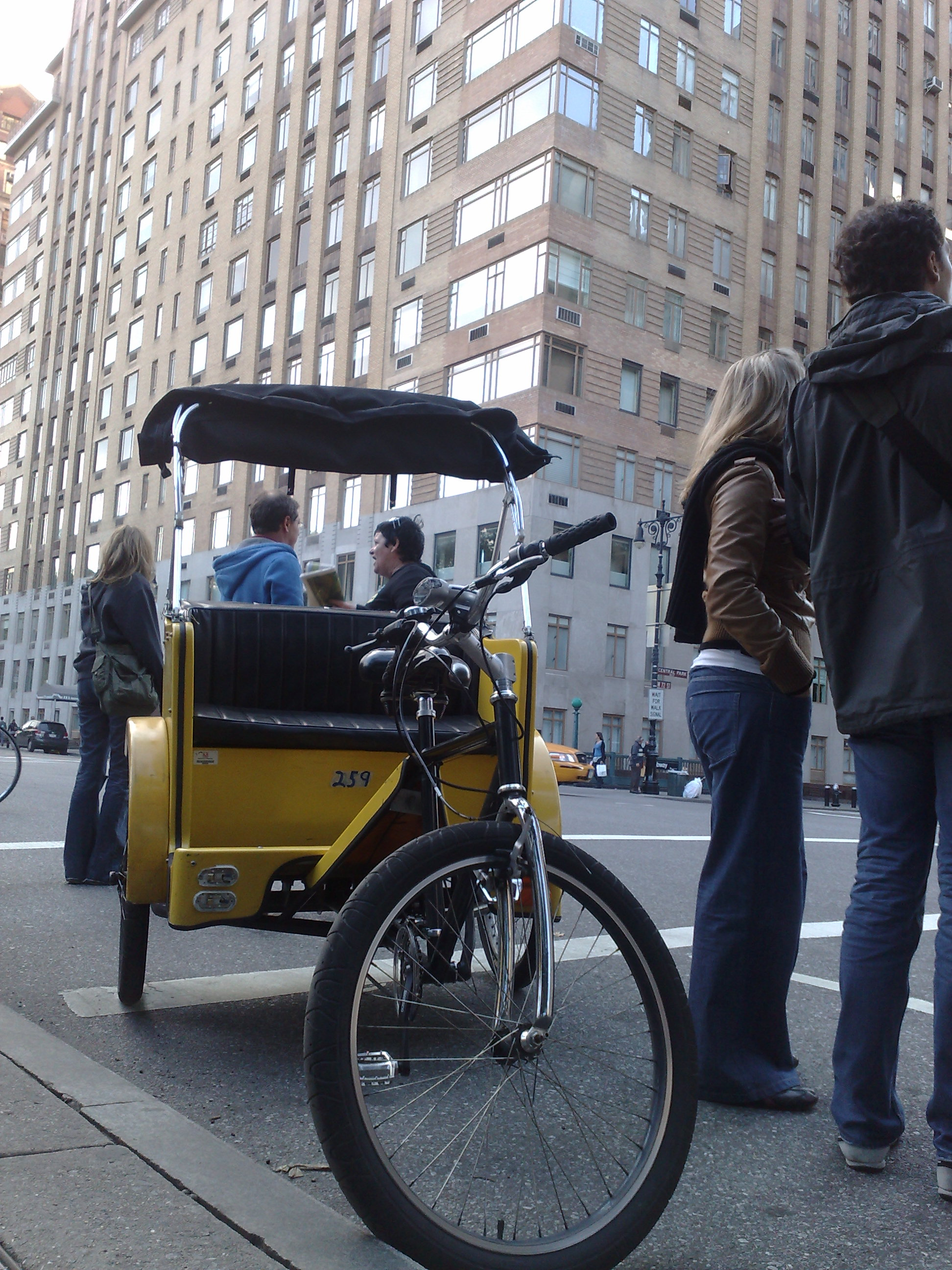
Pedicab in New York City

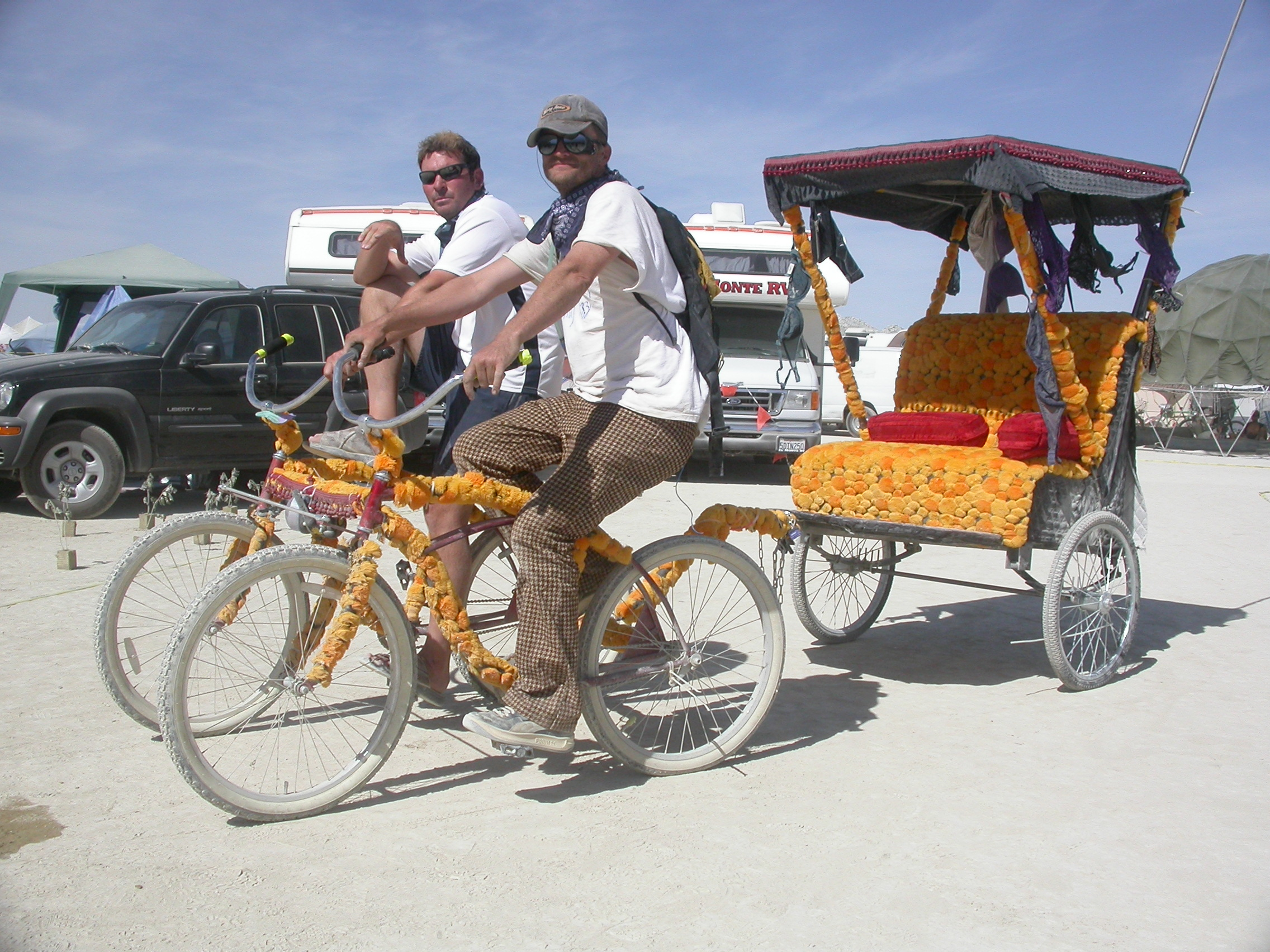
Art bike at the Burning Man Festival, Nevada

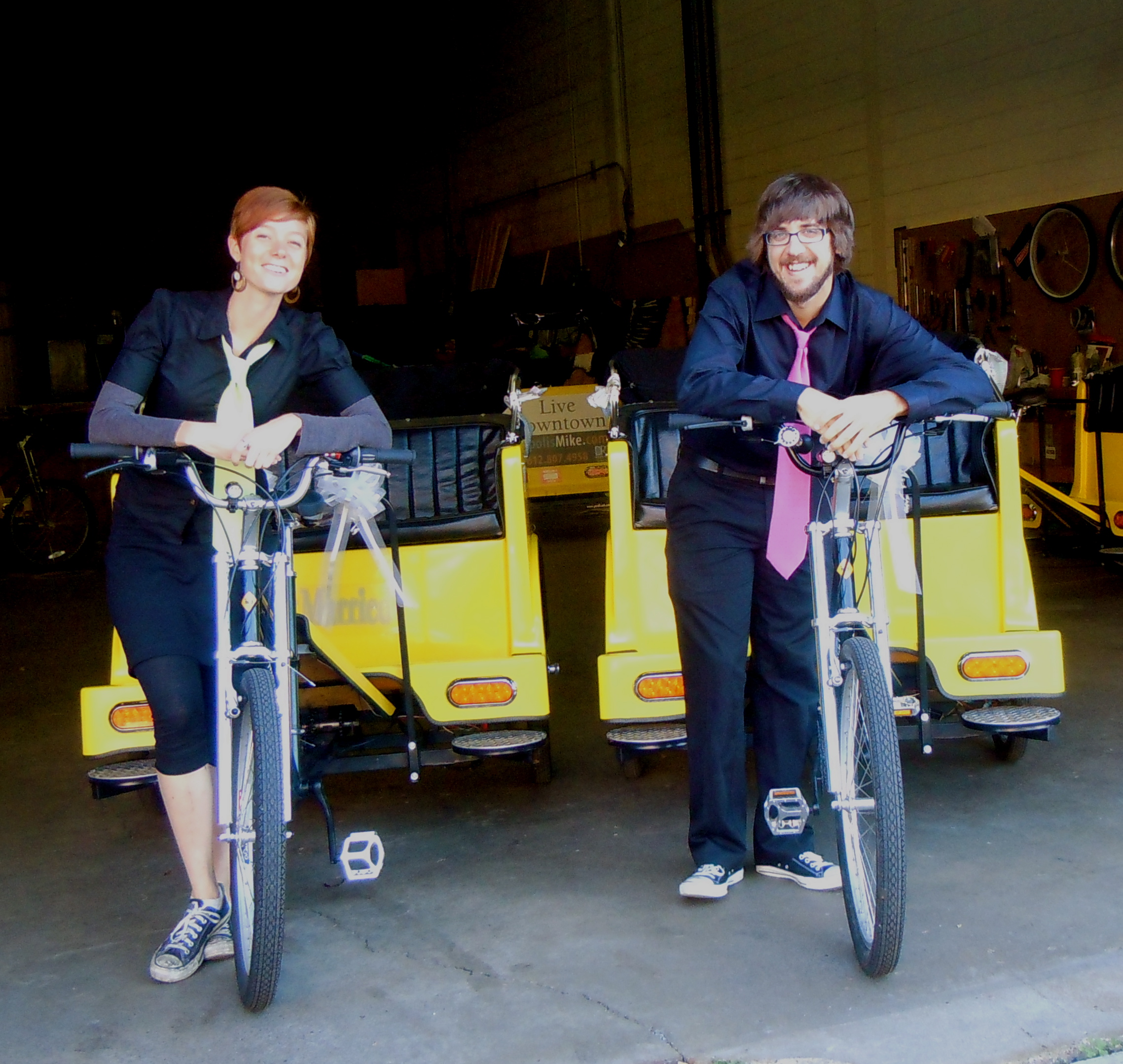
Pedicabs in Minneapolis, Minnesota

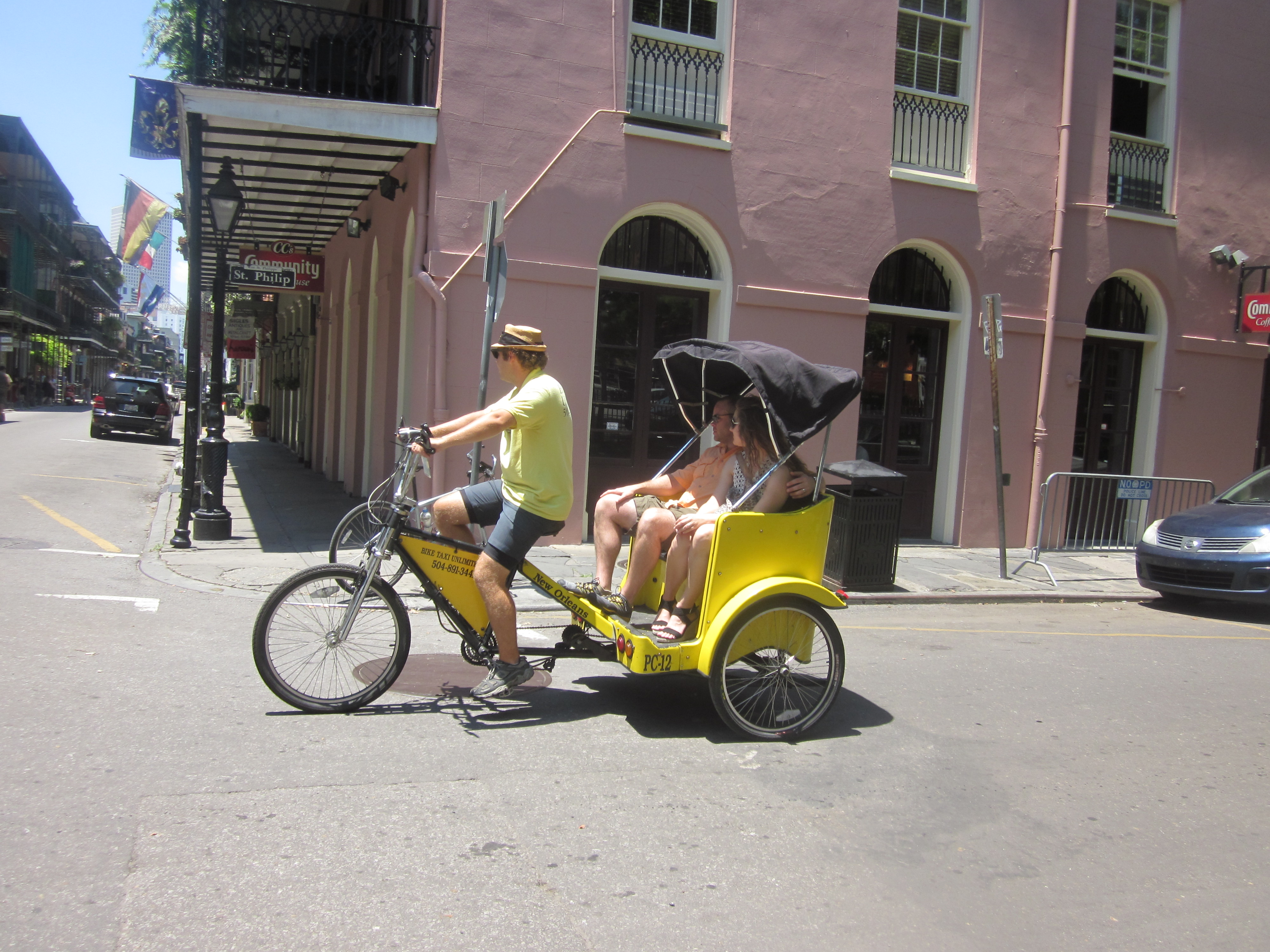
St Philip Royal Pedicab, New Orleans, Louisiana

- Albuquerque, New Mexico
- Austin, Texas
- Baltimore, Maryland
- Bellingham, Washington
- Burlington, Vermont
- Boston, Massachusetts
- Charleston, South Carolina
- Charlotte, North Carolina
- Chicago, Illinois
- Chico, California
- Cincinnati, Ohio
- Columbus, Ohio
- Corvallis, Oregon
- Denver, Colorado
- Detroit, Michigan
- El Paso, Texas
- Eugene, Oregon
- Key West, Florida
- Fort Lauderdale, Florida
- Harrisburg, Pennsylvania
- Houston, Texas
- Indianapolis, Indiana
- Lawrence, Kansas
- Madison, Wisconsin
- Minneapolis, Minnesota
- Nashville, Tennessee
- New Orleans, Louisiana
- New York, New York
- Newport, Rhode Island
- Oklahoma City, Oklahoma
- Philadelphia, Pennsylvania
- Phoenix, Arizona
- Pittsburgh, Pennsylvania
- Portland, Maine
- Portland, Oregon
- Provincetown, Massachusetts
- Raleigh, North Carolina
- Rochester, New York
- Saint Paul, Minnesota
- Salt Lake City, Utah
- San Diego, California
- San Jose, California
- Santa Clara, California
- Santa Cruz, California
- Santa Fe, New Mexico
- Santa Monica, California
- Savannah, Georgia
- Seattle, Washington
- Tempe, Arizona
- Virginia Beach, Virginia
- Washington, DC

=== Where pedicabs are regulated ===
- Austin, Texas – Drivers are required to be licensed by city Ground Transportation department, driving and criminal background checks required. Companies must be registered with city and carry liability insurance. Pedicabs must be registered, and inspected.
- Boston, Massachusetts – Boston Police Department regulates the proliferation of pedicabs. Pedicab companies and drivers must register with the city of Boston.
- Denver, Colorado – Companies are required to hold business, tax license and insurance and are subject to inspections by the Traffic Engineer. All drivers are required to obtain a pedal cab operators license from the Office of Excise and License. Pedal cabs are allowed to operate anywhere in Denver County except for certain daytime restrictions. Sport and event centers, such as Invesco Field and the Pepsi Center, set their own rules for where on the property pedal cabs can operate and usually restrict their access to working one entrance.
- Gainesville, Florida
- Indianapolis, Indiana
- Kansas City, Missouri – Companies are required to hold and annually renew business, tax license and insurance. All rickshaws are inspected annually by city inspector, required to display a carriage license with vehicle capacity. Drivers are required to obtain a carriage drivers license from the city department of licensing and registration, upon verification of drivers history check, criminal background check, and physical.
- Minneapolis, Minnesota – City ordinance requiring that companies pay annual licensing fee, carry insurance, set equipment standards, and also that hours and locations of operation and driver and passenger behavior are regulated.
- New York City
- Oklahoma City, Oklahoma – Companies are required to hold and annually renew business, tax license and insurance. All rickshaws are inspected annually by city inspector, required to display a carriage license with vehicle capacity. Drivers are required to obtain a carriage drivers license from the city department of licensing and registration, upon verification of drivers history check, criminal background check, and physical.
- Orlando, Florida – license to own and/or operate a pedicab must be obtained from the Orlando Police Department
- San Diego, California – license to own and operate are required, including background checks
- Santa Cruz, California – Drivers are licensed through the city's police department and must pass background checks as well as have current driver's license. Companies must be registered with the city and carry liability insurance, and all vehicles must be registered and pass annual safety inspections.
- Tampa, Florida – City required permits
- Washington, DC – The city government has passed regulations through the District Department of Transportation. They are filed under DCMR 18–1213. Additionally, to operate on the National Mall, the National Park Service issues permits through their concessions department. These currently cost $100 per year and have strict insurance and safety requirements.

=== Where pedicabs are prohibited ===
- Las Vegas, Nevada – banned from "The Strip," and effectively from Clark County, where drivers must carry insurance and may not charge fares
