= List of Troy University alumni =

This is a list of notable alumni of Troy University, a public university located in Troy, Alabama, United States, and any of its former names (Troy State University, Troy State College, etc.). Alumni are in alphabetical order by their area of prominence.

== Government ==
- Bennie G. Adkins, U.S. Army command sergeant major; Medal of Honor recipient
- Wes Allen, secretary of state of Alabama (2023-present)
- John Michael Bednarek, lieutenant general, United States Army
- William Beidelman, Union Army second lieutenant, second mayor of Easton, Pennsylvania
- Ray Boland, secretary of the Wisconsin Department of Veterans Affairs
- Richard Brophy, U.S. Navy rear admiral, graduate of U.S. Navy Strike Fighter Weapons School (TOPGUN)
- Bobby Bright, former mayor of Montgomery, Alabama and former congressman for Alabama's 2nd district
- Hank Erwin, politician and Christian evangelist; Republican state senator of Alabama, 2002–2010; portrayed by Sean Astin in the movie Woodlawn
- Jennifer Fidler, member of the Alabama House of Representatives
- Mike Holmes, member of the Alabama House of Representatives
- Don Gaetz, member of the Florida Senate
- Ricky D. Gibbs, US Army brigadier general, master's degree in management
- John C. Hanley, U.S. Army brigadier general
- Gordon S. Holder, former vice admiral in the United States Navy; commander of the Military Sealift Command
- Scott A. Howell, commander of the military's Joint Special Operations Command (JSOC)
- Fitz Johnson, Georgia Public Service Commissioner since 2021
- Manuel H. Johnson, former Federal Reserve Board of Governors, 1986–1990
- Troy King, former attorney general for the state of Alabama
- James J. LeCleir, U.S. Air Force major general
- Michael J. McCarthy, U.S. Air Force major general
- William Oscar Mulkey, former U.S. congressman for the 3rd District of Alabama
- John Perzel, politician and member of the Republican Party
- James A. Roy, chief master sergeant of the Air Force
- Mimi Soltysik, 2016 Socialist Party USA presidential nominee
- Steve Southerland, former politician and member of the Republican Party; served as the U.S. representative for Florida's 2nd congressional district, 2011–2015
- Kim Swan, politician; Leader of Her Majesty's Loyal Opposition in Bermuda and Party Leader of the United Bermuda Party
- Bill Johnson, politician and member of the Republican Party; served as the U.S. representative for Ohio's 16th congressional district, 2010–present
- Charles F. Wald, former deputy commander of United States European Command; four-star general
- Cam Ward, Republican member of the Alabama Senate
- Derrick Jackson, member of the Georgia House of Representatives
- Eric J. Wesley, deputy commanding general of United States Army Futures Command; three-star general

== Media ==
- Jill Dobson, Fox News Channel entertainment correspondent; former Miss Michigan and Miss USA contestant
- Tom Foreman, CNN political correspondent and host of This Week at War and This Week in Politics
- Danielle Frye, pit road announcer for NASCAR radio affiliate Motor Racing Network
- Lynne Koplitz, stand-up comedian and actress
- Natalie Montgomery-Carroll, fitness professional and contestant on Big Brother 5 on CBS
- Adria Montgomery-Klein, fitness professional and contestant on Big Brother 5 on CBS
- Melanie Newman, play-by-play broadcaster for the Baltimore Orioles of Major League Baseball (MLB); first woman to be a play-by-play announcer for the Orioles and one of only four women play-by-play broadcasters active in MLB
- Craig Pittman, award-winning author, former long-time columnist and writer for Tampa Bay Times
- James "J.T." Thomas, Jr., contestant and winner of Survivor: Tocantins on CBS

== Science, education, and the arts ==
- John Bott, artist; professor emeritus of Colby–Sawyer College
- Delphine Feminear Thomas, class of 1910, educator, state official
- Kevin A. Ford, NASA astronaut; pilot of the Space Shuttle Discovery during the August 2009 STS-128 mission; commander for the November 2012 Expedition 34 mission to the International Space Station (ISS)
- James D. Halsell, NASA astronaut, flew multiple missions to the International Space Station (ISS)
- William G. Gregory, former NASA astronaut and STS–67 pilot for the March 1995 mission of the Space Shuttle Endeavour
- Kevin Kregel, NASA astronaut and mission commander for the February 2000 mission of the Space Shuttle Endeavour
- Bubba Scott, former executive director of the AHSAA; former football head coach at Samford University
- Robert W. Smith, band composer and educator
- Zula Brown Toole, first woman to found and publish a newspaper in Georgia

== Sports ==
- Mario Addison, NFL player with the Carolina Panthers
- Ben Bates, professional PGA golfer
- Jonathan Carter, former NFL player
- Elaine Cheris (born 1946), Olympic fencer
- Brannon Condren, former NFL safety with the Indianapolis Colts
- Danny Cox, former MLB veteran of eleven years
- Vincent Hancock, 3-time Olympic gold medalist in skeet shooting
- DuJuan Harris, former NFL player
- Fred Hatfield, former MLB infielder
- Kerry Jenkins, former NFL offensive lineman for the Tampa Bay Buccaneers and Super Bowl XXXVII champion
- Jerrel Jernigan, former NFL player
- Robbie Laing, head men's basketball coach at Campbell University
- Al Lucas, former NFL and Arena Football League lineman who died during a game while playing for the Los Angeles Avengers
- Elbert Mack, NFL defensive back for the Tampa Bay Buccaneers
- Alfred Malone, NFL defensive tackle for the Green Bay Packers on the practice squad
- Bubba Marriott, American player of gridiron football
- Sherrod Martin, former NFL player
- Larry Mason, NFL running back for the Cleveland Browns and the Green Bay Packers
- Leodis McKelvin, 11th overall pick in the 1st Round of the 2008 NFL draft, first-team All-American football player and current cornerback for the Buffalo Bills
- Steve McLendon, former NFL player
- Derrick Moore, former NFL player and current chaplain for the Georgia Tech Yellow Jackets football team
- Marcus Richardson, linebacker for the Houston Texans
- Mike Rivera, catcher for MLB's Milwaukee Brewers
- Windham Rotunda, professional wrestler known as Bray Wyatt in WWE
- Mackey Sasser, former MLB catcher
- Virgil Seay, former NFL wide receiver player and Super Bowl XVII champion
- Willie Tullis, former NFL player
- Lawrence Tynes, Scottish-American NFL place kicker for the Super Bowl XLII champion New York Giants
- Osi Umenyiora, All-Pro NFL defensive end for the Super Bowl XLII champion New York Giants
- Rod Walker, former NFL player who played defensive tackle for three seasons for the Green Bay Packers
- DeMarcus Ware, NFL Hall of fame and All-Pro NFL linebacker for the Denver Broncos
- Leonard Wheeler, former NFL player
