= List of Southern University alumni =

This is a list of notable Southern University alumni.

== Athletes ==
Name	Class year	Notability	Reference(s)
Al Beauchamp	1968	former National Football League linebacker	
Mel Blount	1970	member of the Pro Football Hall of Fame	
William Breda	1950	Negro league outfielder, 1950 - 1954	
Lou Brock		record-setting base-stealing Major League Baseball player	
Harold Carmichael	1971	member of the Pro Football Hall of Fame	
Darren Clark	2006	former MLB baseball player, New York Mets, SU Hall of Fame	
Willie Davenport		gold medalist in men's 110 m hurdles at the 1968 Mexico City Olympic Games for the U.S. track team	
Donnie Davis	1962	former NFL, CFL and WFL player	
Marvin Davis	1974	former NFL and CFL player and Grey Cup champion	
Matthew Dorsett	1995	former pro football player, Super Bowl XXXI champion	
Ken Ellis	1970	former NFL player, Green Bay Packers	
Oliver Ford		former 100m world record holder	
Tommie Green	1978	former National Basketball Association player, New Orleans Jazz	
Rich Jackson	1966	member of the American Football League Hall of Fame	
Avery Johnson	1988	1999 NBA Champion, 2006 NBA Coach of the Year, University of Alabama head basketball coach, Louisiana Sports Hall of Fame inductee	
Brian Johnson		United States Olympic long jumper	
Ralph Waldo Emerson Jones		president and baseball coach at Grambling State University, 1936–1977	
Tyrone Jones	1983	former Canadian Football League all-star and MVP	
Fred Lewis		Major League Baseball player	
Bob Love		former NBA All-Star and second leading scorer in Chicago Bulls history	
Rod Milburn		gold medalist in men's 110 m hurdles at the 1972 Munich Olympic Games	
Jordan Miller	2011	NFL defensive tackle	
Bobby Phills		NBA basketball player	
Isiah Robertson	1971	six-time NFL Pro Bowler	
Bernie Smith		former Major League Baseball player	
Donnell Smith	1971	former NFL player	
Godwin Turk	1974	former NFL player	
Rickie Weeks		Major League Baseball player	
Aeneas Williams	1991	member of the Pro Football Hall of Fame	
Lenny Williams	2004	former NFL and CFL player	
Jerry Wilson	1995	former NFL player	
Ken Winey	1987	former CFL player	

== Entertainers and personalities ==
Name	Class year	Notability	Reference(s)
David Banner	1997	music recording artist, producer, actor	
Alvin Batiste	1955	jazz artist and educator	
James Booker		rhythm and blues keyboardist	
Isiah Carey		television news reporter	
Donald Harrison	1979	jazz artist	
Randy Jackson	1979	musician, record producer, former American Idol judge	
Faith Jenkins		Miss Louisiana 2000, Miss America runner-up 2001, attorney, TV personality, star of Judge Faith	
Van Lathan		journalist, producer, podcaster, and political commentator	
Branford Marsalis		jazz saxophonist	
Connie Simpson		celebrity nanny	

== Politicians, judges and public officials ==
Name	Class year	Notability	Reference(s)
Diana Bajoie		member of both houses of the Louisiana State Legislature (1976–2008); member of the New Orleans City Council (2012–2013)	
Troy E. Brown		member of the Louisiana State Senate from 2012 until his resignation in 2017	
Barbara West Carpenter		dean of international relations at Southern University; Democratic member of the Louisiana House of Representatives since 2016	
Israel B. Curtis		Democratic member of the Louisiana House of Representatives (1992–2008) and the Rapides Parish School Board (1976–1992), former Alexandria educator and insurance agent, did graduate study at Southern	
Irma Muse Dixon		first African-American elected to the Louisiana Public Service Commission (PSC)	
Cleo Fields		former state senator and U.S. representative for Louisiana's 4th congressional district	
Mike Foster	2004 (Juris Doctor)	53rd governor of Louisiana	
Randal Gaines		member of the Louisiana House of Representatives for St. Charles and St. John the Baptist parishes since 2012	
Kip Holden		mayor-president of Baton Rouge 2005–2017	
Hilry Huckaby III	1969 (Juris Doctor)	member of Shreveport, Louisiana city council (1978–1990, 1998–2001), Caddo district judge (1992–1995)	
Jason Hughes		member of the Louisiana House of Representatives from District 100 in Orleans Parish	
Marcus Hunter	2002	member of the Louisiana House of Representatives from District 17 in Ouachita Parish	
Edward C. James		member of the Louisiana House of Representatives for District 101 in East Baton Rouge Parish; Baton Rouge lawyer	
William J. Jefferson		former representative, U.S. Congress	
Okla Jones II		federal judge on the United States District Court for the Eastern District of Louisiana	
Edmond Jordan		Democratic member since 2016 of the Louisiana House of Representatives for West and East Baton Rouge parishes; lawyer in Brusly, Louisiana	
James A. Joseph	1956	ambassador to South Africa (1996–1999)	
Isiah Leggett		county executive of Montgomery County, Maryland 2006-2018	
Robert M. Marionneaux		Louisiana state senator since 2000 from Baton Rouge area	
Randy Moore		first African-American chief of the United States Forest Service	
Abe E. Pierce, III	1956	first African-American mayor of Monroe, Louisiana (1996–2000)	
Rupert Richardson		African-American civil rights activist and civil rights leader who served as president of the National Association for the Advancement of Colored People (NAACP) from 1992 to 1995	
Jesse N. Stone		attorney, educator, served as dean of the Southern University Law Center and as president of Southern University	
Dorothy Mae Taylor		first African-American woman to serve in the Louisiana House of Representatives, 1971–1980	
Ledricka Thierry	1999	state representative for St. Landry Parish since 2009	
Taylor Townsend		state representative from Natchitoches Parish (2000–2008)	
Pinkie C. Wilkerson		Louisiana House of Representatives (1992–2000)	
Alfred C. Williams	1972	member of the Louisiana House from Baton Rouge since 2012; former school board member and attorney	
Patrick C. Williams		state representative for Caddo Parish since 2007	
Tom Willmott		Louisiana House of Representatives from Jefferson Parish since 2008	

== Military commanders ==
Name	Class year	Notability	Reference(s)
Joe N. Ballard		lieutenant general (retired), first African-American Chief of Engineers and Commander, United States Army Corps of Engineers	
Sherian Grace Cadoria		brigadier general (retired), first African-American woman to reach the rank of general in U.S. Army	
Paris Davis		colonel (retired), one of the first African-Americans to become an officer in US Army Special Forces, awarded the Medal of Honor for actions in the Vietnam War	
Russel L. Honoré		lieutenant general who commanded the U.S. military support of recovery efforts in the Gulf Coast after Hurricanes Katrina and Rita	

== Academics ==
Name	Class year	Notability	Reference(s)
Karen Butler-Purry	1985	professor in the Department of Electrical and Computer Engineering at Texas A&M University	
Kathie Stromile Golden	1976	provost, senior vice president for academic affairs, and professor at Mississippi Valley State University	
William Moore	1963	first African-American to graduate with a PhD in chemistry from Purdue University	
Jewel Prestage	1951	first African-American woman to earn Ph.D. in Political Science	
Morgan Watson		one of the first African-American engineers at NASA, beginning in January 1964	
