= 1954 United States Senate election in Louisiana =

1954 Democratic Senate primary election in Louisiana
- July 27, 1954
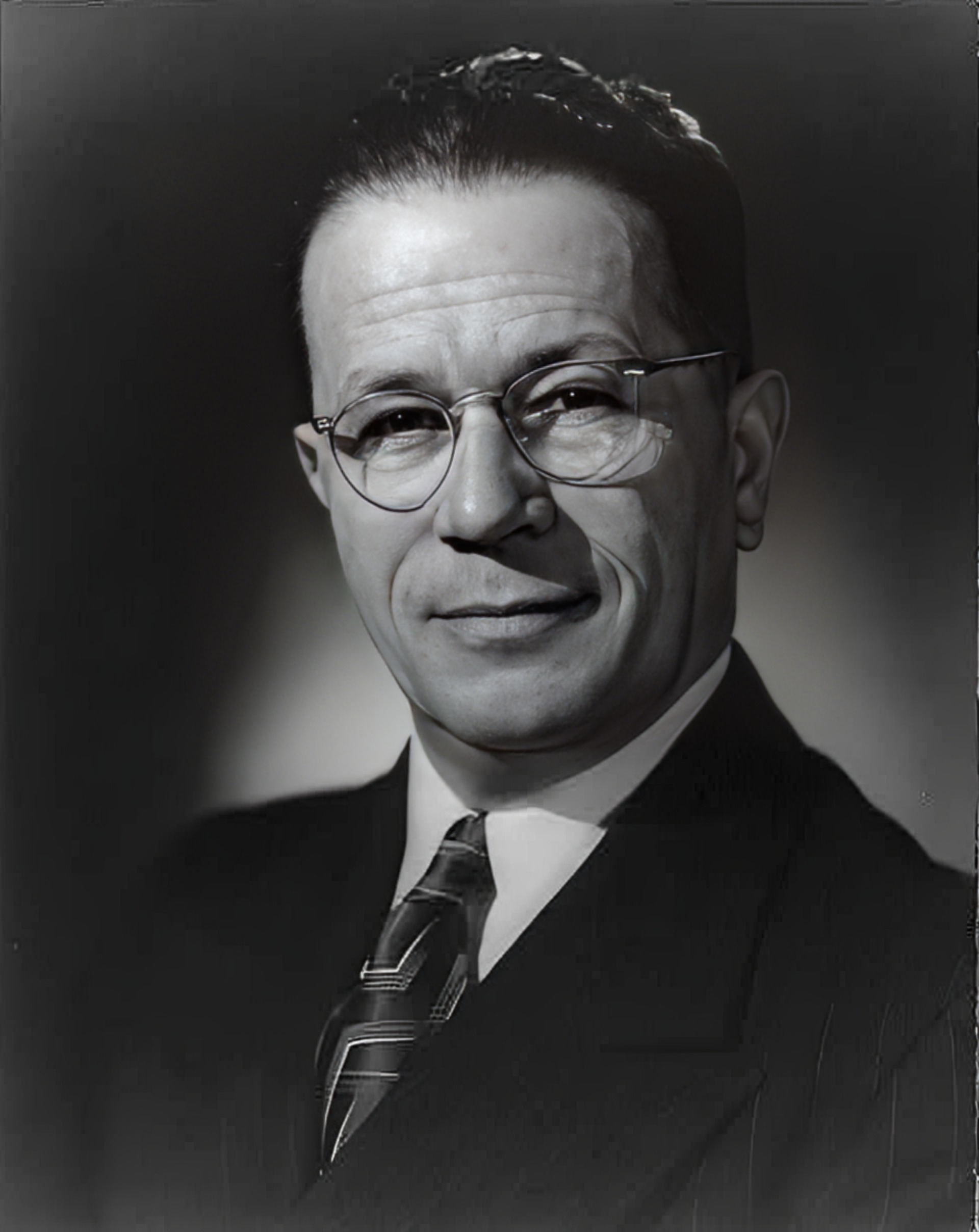

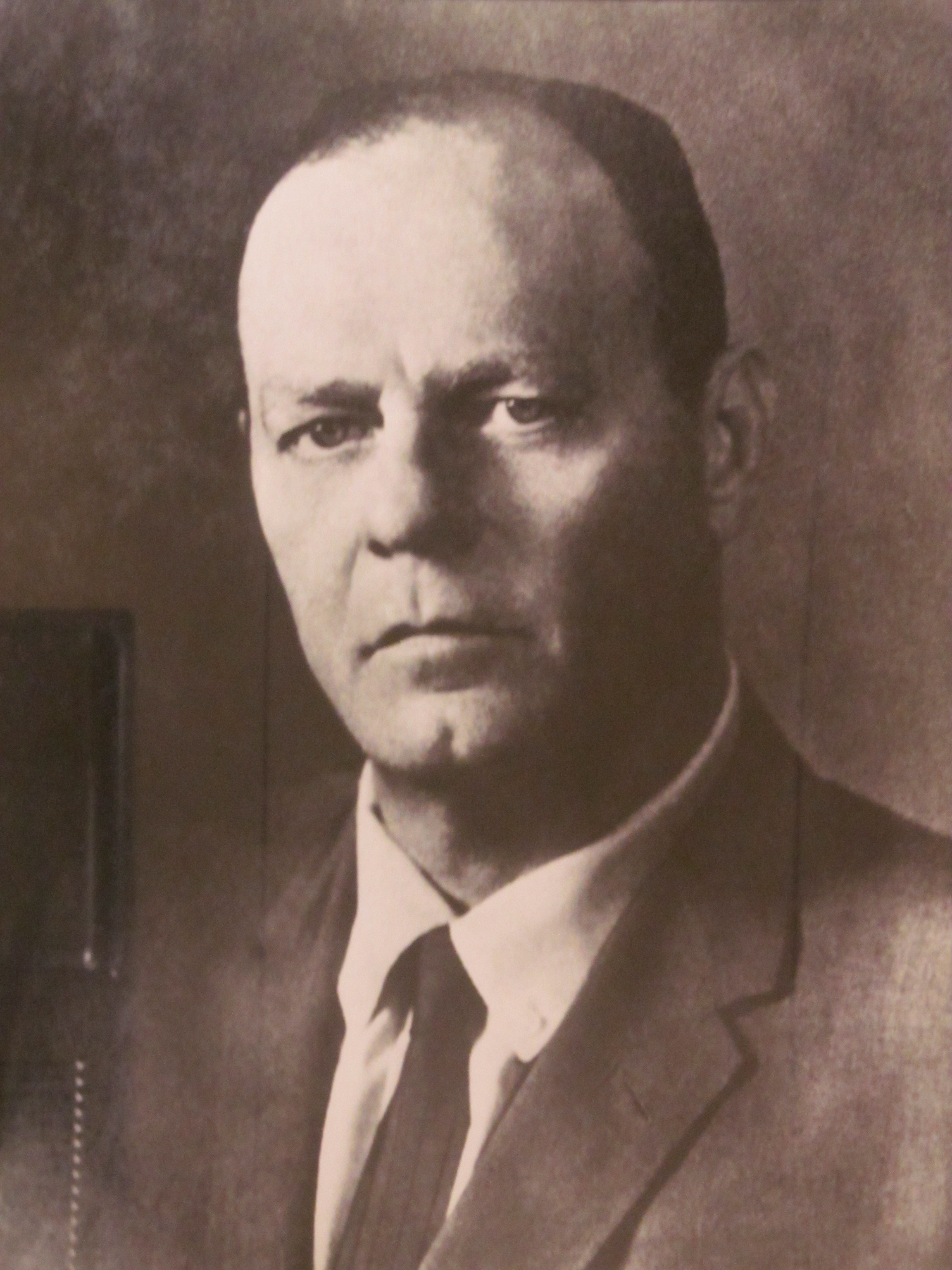
| Nominee | Allen J. Ellender | Frank B. Ellis |
| Party | Democratic | Democratic |
| Popular vote | 268,054 | 162,775 |
| Percentage | 59.15% | 35.92% |
- Parish results Ellender: 30–40% 50–60% 60–70% 70–80% 80–90% >90% Ellis: 50–60%
U.S. senator before election
Allen Ellender
Democratic
Elected U.S. Senator
Allen Ellender
Democratic

The 1954 United States Senate election in Louisiana was held on November 2, 1954. Incumbent Senator Allen J. Ellender was re-elected to a fourth term in office.

On July 27, Ellender won the Democratic primary with 59.15% of the vote. At this time, Louisiana was a one-party state, and the Democratic nomination was tantamount to victory. Ellender won the November general election without an opponent.

== Democratic primary ==
=== Candidates ===
- Allen J. Ellender, incumbent Senator
- Frank B. Ellis, member of the Democratic National Committee
- W. Gilbert Faulk, State Representative from Monroe

=== Results ===
1954 United States Senate Democratic primary
| Party | Candidate | Votes | % |
|---|---|---|---|
| Democratic | Allen J. Ellender (incumbent) | 268,054 | 59.15% |
| Democratic | Frank Burton Ellis | 162,775 | 35.92% |
| Democratic | W. Gilbert Faulk | 22,366 | 4.94% |
| Total votes | | 453,195 | 100.00% |

== General election ==
1954 United States Senate election
| Party | Candidate | Votes | % | ±% |
|---|---|---|---|---|
| Democratic | Allen J. Ellender (incumbent) | 207,115 | 100.00% | Steady |
| Total votes | | 207,115 | 100.00% | |
