= Deepwater Horizon litigation =

The civil and criminal proceedings stemming from the explosion of Deepwater Horizon and the resulting massive oil spill in the Gulf of Mexico began shortly after the April 20, 2010 incident and have continued since then. They have included an extensive claims settlement process for a guilty plea to criminal charges by BP, and an ongoing Clean Water Act lawsuit brought by the U.S. Department of Justice and other parties.

A federal judge, ruling on the Clean Water Act suit in September 2014, found that BP was primarily responsible for the oil spill as a result of its deliberate misconduct and gross negligence. The finding meant that the company was subjected to $18 billion in penalties in addition to the $28 billion already paid out in claims and cleanup costs. In July 2015, BP settled the case and carries some extra penalties.

== Litigation timeline ==
The Deepwater Horizon explosion and oil spill resulted in an onslaught of litigation

Litigation commenced almost immediately after the explosion and oil spill. By May 27, 2010, Transocean, which owned the Deepwater Horizon, said in testimony before the U.S. House Judiciary Committee that it was the defendant in 120 lawsuits, of which more than 80 were class actions seeking payment for financial losses covered by the Oil Spill Pollution Act. The company said that most of these early plaintiffs were "fishermen, hotel operators, landowners, rental companies, restaurants and seafood processors, all of which claimed a current or potential future loss of business in the aftermath of the oil spill."

At the same time, UK media reported that over 130 lawsuits relating to the spill had been filed against one or more of BP, Transocean, Cameron International Corporation, and Halliburton Energy Services, although it was considered likely by observers that these would be combined into one court as a multidistrict litigation. Because the spill had been largely lingering offshore, the plaintiffs who claimed damages at that time were mostly out-of-work fishermen and tourist resorts that were receiving cancellations. BP and Transocean wanted the cases to be heard in Houston, seen as friendly to the oil business, but the plaintiffs requested the case to be heard in Louisiana, Mississippi, or Florida. Five New Orleans judges recused themselves from hearing oil spill cases because of stock ownership in companies involved or other conflicts of interest. BP has retained law firm Kirkland & Ellis to defend most of the lawsuits arising from the oil spill.

BP, which largely self-insures through its own Jupiter Insurance Ltd, was also the subject of early litigation from multiple Lloyd's of London underwriting syndicates and other underwriters seeking a declaration that they were not liable to BP under Transocean's US $700 million insurance policy.

In June 2010, Hornbeck Offshore Services, joined by several dozen corporations with offshore interests, filed suit in U.S. District Court seeking to enjoin the U.S. Department of the Interior from imposing a ban on deep water drilling.

In July 2010, news reports claimed that BP had been attempting to hire prominent scientists from public universities around the Gulf Coast to aid its defense against the lawsuit that the federal government would bring as a result of the spill. BP attempted to hire the entire marine sciences department at one university, but the university declined because of confidentiality restrictions. However several other universities accepted. In developing its case, the government drew on the large amount of scientific research conducted by academic institutions along the Gulf, and many scientists being hired by BP serve at those same institutions. The contract prohibited the scientists from publishing their research, sharing it with other scientists or speaking about the data that they collect for at least the next three years, and it required scientists to agree to withhold data even in the face of a court order if BP decided to fight the order. It stipulated that scientists would be paid only for research approved by BP. Robert Wiygul, who specializes in environmental law, said that he saw ethical questions regarding the use of publicly owned laboratories and research vessels to conduct confidential work on behalf of a private company. "This is not an agreement to do research for BP. This is an agreement to join BP's legal team. You agree to communicate with BP through their attorneys and to take orders from their attorneys." The contracts have the added impact of limiting the number of scientists who are able to work with federal agencies.

In August 2010, 77 cases, including those brought by state governments, individuals, and companies, in the U.S. District Court for the Eastern District of Louisiana under Multi-District Litigation docket MDL No. 2179, captioned In re: Oil Spill by the Oil Rig "Deepwater Horizon" in the Gulf of Mexico, on April 20, 2010, presided over by U.S. District Judge Carl Barbier. Judge Barbier is trying the case without a jury, as is normal in United States admiralty law.

On December 15, 2010, the Department of Justice filed a civil suit against BP and other defendants for violations under the Clean Water Act in the U.S. District Court for the Eastern District of Louisiana. This was consolidated with the other cases. captioned United States of America v. BP Exploration & Production Inc. et al., Civ. Action No. 2:10-cv-04536.

In April 2011, BP filed $40 billion in lawsuits against rig owner Transocean, cementer Halliburton and blowout preventer manufacturer Cameron International. The oil firm alleged failed safety systems, and irresponsible behavior of contractors had led to the explosion, including claims that Halliburton failed to properly use modelling software to analyze safe drilling conditions.

In October 2013, it was reported that BP was facing tens of millions of dollars of new claims from British shareholders who lost money and claimed that BP did not come clean about the scale of the disaster. The shareholders included the South Yorkshire Pensions Authority, Skandia Global Funds and GAM Fund Management.

In April 2023, The Guardian reported that BP had engaged in "scorched earth" legal tactics in fending off litigation from cleanup workers and others impacted by the spill, many of whom were low-income and suffering from long-term health effects, physically and mentally respectively.

== Department of Justice lawsuit ==
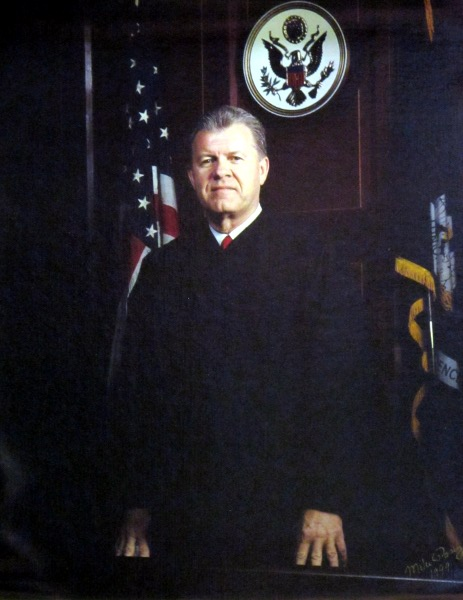
Judge Carl J. Barbier found that BP had committed gross negligence

On December 15, 2010, The United States Department of Justice filed a civil and criminal suit against BP and its partners in the oil well, Transocean and Halliburton, for violations under the Clean Water Act in the U.S. District Court for the Eastern District of Louisiana. The plaintiffs included Gulf states and private individuals. The case was consolidated with about 200 others, including those brought by state governments, individuals, and companies under Multi-District Litigation docket MDL No. 2179, before U.S. District Judge Carl Barbier. The Justice Department sought the stiffest fines possible, and has said it would seek to prove that BP "was grossly negligent and engaged in willful misconduct in causing the oil spill." BP denied that, saying that gross negligence is a high bar that cannot be surmounted, and that the oil spill was a "tragic accident." The case was carefully watched, because a ruling of gross negligence would result in a four-fold increase in Clean Water Act penalties, and would leave the company liable for punitive damages for private claims. Any fines from gross negligence would hit BP's bottom line very hard, because they would not be tax-deductible. The company paid no federal income tax to the U.S. government in 2010 because of deductions related to the spill.

=== DOJ claims ===
On August 31, 2012, the Department of Justice (DOJ) filed papers in federal court in New Orleans, blaming BP PLC for the Gulf oil spill, describing the spill as an example of "gross negligence and willful misconduct." BP rejected the charges, saying "BP believes it was not grossly negligent and looks forward to presenting evidence on this issue at trial in January." The DOJ also said Transocean, the owner and operator of the Deepwater Horizon rig, is guilty of gross negligence as well.

The DOJ brief strongly criticized officials for failing to rerun a "negative pressure test" when the first test revealed a pressure anomaly from the well. Despite acknowledging the pressure reading and agreeing that it was worrisome, BP's supervisors did not run the test again. Ordering a retest would have begun with the closing of the rig's blowout preventer, which would have stopped the flow before the blowout. DOJ attorneys state, "That such a simple, yet fundamental and safety-critical test could have been so stunningly, blindingly botched in so many ways, by so many people, demonstrates gross negligence."

The government cited "a culture of corporate recklessness" in their investigation of the events leading up to the blow out. The DOJ's attorneys brief includes several emails exchanged between John Guide, the Macondo well engineer, and David Sims, his boss. In one email, Guide remarked that Macondo was a very difficult well, that the drilling crew was "flying by the seat of our pants" under a "huge level of paranoia" that was "driving chaos" and concluded that "the operation is not going to succeed if we continue in this manner." The government attorneys call Guide's email a "clarion cry of impending disaster" and question why Sims did no follow-up and why BP's internal investigators didn't mention it in their report on the events leading up to the disaster. In another email, Sims noted that BP had sent out 15 extra "centralizers" to complete the well cementing, but Guide then ordered that they not be used. In an email quoted in the brief, Guide concluded, "But, who cares, it is done, end of story. Will probably be fine."

The DOJ also refused to accept BP's assertion that the Gulf's ecosystem has gone through a robust recovery and that the clean up was largely complete, saying that there was far more damage than met the eye and more cleanup was to be done. "The fact that a section of shoreline is no longer considered suitable for response action does not mean that it is not suffering continuing injury from the Spill. For example, an important consideration in deciding on appropriate response action is whether a cleanup technique will cause more harm than good."

=== First phase trial ===
The consolidated trial's first phase began on February 20, 2013, to determine the liability of BP, Transocean, Halliburton, and other companies, and to determine whether the companies acted with gross negligence and willful misconduct. The second phase began on September 30, 2013, and focused on the how much oil spilled into the gulf and who was responsible for stopping it. The third phase began in January 2015, and focused on all other liability that occurred in the process of oil spill cleanup and containment issues, including the use of dispersants. Test jury trials followed to determine actual damage amounts. The Wall Street Journal reported in 2013 that the U.S. government and Gulf Coast states have prepared a $16 billion settlement offer to BP. However, it was unclear if the deal was officially proposed.

Claims against BP's drilling fluids contractor M-I LLC were dismissed by U.S. District Judge Carl Barbier during the trial, and judge also ruled out punitive damages against Cameron International, the manufacturer of the blowout preventer on the Deepwater Horizon rig.

=== Gross negligence ruling ===
On September 4, 2014, U.S. District Judge Carl Barbier ruled in the Clean Water Act trial that BP was guilty of gross negligence and willful misconduct under the Act. He described BP's actions as "reckless," while he said Transocean's and Halliburton's actions were "negligent." He mandated 67% of the blame for the spill to BP, 30% to Transocean, and 3% to Halliburton. Fines would also be mandated with the degree of negligence of the parties, measured against the number of barrels of oil spilled. Under the Clean Water Act, fines could be based on a cost per barrel of up to $4,300, at the discretion of the judge. The number of barrels was in dispute at the conclusion of the trial with BP arguing 2.5 million barrels were spilled over the 87 days the spill lasted, while the court contended that 4.2 million barrels were spilled. BP issued a statement, strongly disagreeing with the finding, and saying that the court's decision would be appealed.

Barbier ruled that BP had acted with “conscious disregard of known risks" and rejected BP's assertion that other parties were equally responsible for the oil spill. His ruling stated that BP "employees took risks that led to the largest environmental disaster in U.S. history,” that the company was “reckless,” and determined that several crucial BP decisions were “primarily driven by a desire to save time and money, rather than ensuring that the well was secure.”

The ruling meant that BP, which had already spent more than $28 billion on cleanup costs and damage claims, was liable for another $18 billion in damages, four times the Clean Water Act maximum penalties and many times more than the $3.5 billion BP had already allotted. Barbier ruled that BP had acted with “conscious disregard of known risks.” BP strongly disagreed with the ruling and filed an immediate appeal. In July 2015, BP made settlement, paying some extra penalties.

== Claims settlement ==
On March 2, 2012, BP agreed to settle roughly 100,000 claims filed by individuals and businesses affected by the spill. According to a group representing the plaintiffs, the deal had no specific cap; BP estimated that it would pay approximately $7.8 billion. BP stated that it had $9.5 billion in assets set aside in a trust to pay the claims, and the settlement was not to exceed the $37.2 billion budget the company paid for spill-related expenses. Individual claimants would not be required to agree to the settlement, but experts estimated that such claims would be insignificant. By December 2013, BP had paid nearly $13 billion in claims to businesses, individuals, and the government.

Not included in the settlement were claims by U.S. states and federal fines. David Uhlmann, a lawyer who served Justice Department's environmental crime section, believed that the settlement of private claims would facilitate a deal between BP and the various governmental departments being reached. Fadel Gheit, an analyst at Oppenheimer & Co. agreed.

On August 13, BP asked U.S. District Judge Carl Barbier to approve the settlement, saying that its actions "did not constitute gross negligence or willful misconduct". Under the Oil Pollution Act of 1990, a company responsible was liable for only $75 million in economic damages, provided that it did not exhibit "gross negligence" and that the federal government picked up the next $1 billion. In response to the BP filing and in order to ensure that BP could not use its filing and any possible acceptance of the settlement to escape a judgement of gross negligence, on August 31, 2012, the Department of Justice (DOJ) filed papers describing the spill as an example of "gross negligence and willful misconduct". The government also advised that Judge Barbier was to disregard claims made by BP that minimize the environmental and economic impacts of the spill. They cited environmental damage that "could cause negative impacts to marsh vegetation for years to decades." BP rejected the charges saying "BP believes it was not grossly negligent and looks forward to presenting evidence on this issue at trial in January." A ruling of gross negligence would result in a four-fold increase in Clean Water Act penalties, which would cause the penalties to reach approximately $17.6 billion, and would increase damages in the other suits as well.

In October 2012, Judge Barbier rejected a request filed by Houston attorney Armistead Easterby to extend the deadline to opt out of the class action.

On January 13, 2013, Judge Barbier approved a medical-benefits portion of BP's proposed $7.8 billion partial settlement. People living for at least 60 days along oil-impacted shores or involved in the clean-up who could document one or more specific health conditions caused by the oil or dispersants were eligible for benefits. Those who were injured during clean-up were also eligible for benefits. BP also agreed to spend $105 million over five years to set up a Gulf Coast health outreach program and pay for medical examinations. According to a group presenting the plaintiffs, the deal had no specific cap.

On July 2, Judge Barbier appointed former FBI director Louis Freeh to conduct an independent investigation into allegations of improprieties within the Court Supervised Settlement Program. Freeh found that the claims process was not corrupt, but found some incidents of conflict of interest and fraud.

BP claimed that the process was rife with fraud, and sued a Texas lawyer for allegedly representing tens of thousands of "phantom" clients. The attorney for the lawyer, Robert McDuff, called BP's actions “another of a series of efforts to walk away from the settlement to which it agreed.”

In January 2014, a panel of the U.S. Fifth Circuit Court of Appeals rejected an effort by BP to curb payment of what it described as "fictitious" and "absurd" claims to a settlement fund for businesses and persons affected by the oil spill. BP said that administration of the 2012 settlement was marred by the fact that people without actual damages could file a claim. The court ruled that BP hadn't explained "how this court or the district court should identify or even discern the existence of 'claimants that have suffered no cognizable injury.'" BP originally projected that its settlement costs would be $7.8 billion. As of late October 2013 it had boosted this estimate to $9.2 billion, and said it could be "significantly higher."

In September 2014, Halliburton agreed to settle a large percentage of legal claims against it over the Deepwater spill by paying $1.1 billion into a trust by way of three installments over two years.

In May 2015, a panel of the U.S. Fifth Circuit Court of Appeals determined that BP and claimants had the right to appellate review of claim awards. In that same decision it held that non-profits were eligible to receive claim payments.

On July 2, 2015, BP and five states announced an $18.5 billion settlement to be used for Clean Water Act penalties and various claims.

== BP guilty plea ==
On November 14, 2012, BP and the Department of Justice reached a settlement, under which BP agreed to pay $4.5 billion in fines and other payments, the largest of its kind in U.S. history. BP also agreed to plead guilty to 11 felony counts related to the deaths of the 11 workers. The Justice Department also filed criminal charges against one BP employee in April 2012 and against three BP employees in November 2012. Two employees were indicted on manslaughter charges for acting negligently in their supervision of key safety tests performed on the rig prior to the explosion and failure to alert onshore engineers of problems in the drilling operation. Two employees were charged with obstruction of justice and for lying to federal investigators. Attorney General Eric Holder said that the criminal investigation wasn't over and that more company officials could be charged. In addition, the U.S. government temporarily banned BP from new federal contracts over its "lack of business integrity". The plea was accepted by Judge Sarah Vance of the United States District Court for the Eastern District of Louisiana on 31 January 2013.

The settlement included payments of $2.394 billion to the National Fish and Wildlife Foundation, $1.15 billion to the Oil Spill Liability Trust Fund, $350 million to the National Academy of Sciences for oil spill prevention and response research, $100 million to the North America Wetland Conservation Fund, $6 million to General Treasury and $525 million to the Securities and Exchange Commission. BP still faced payouts fines under the Natural Resources Damage Assessment and payouts to impacted states. The settlement did not resolve what might be the largest penalty related to the spill, the fines under the Clean Water Act. The potential fine for the spill under the act was between $1,100 to $4,300 per barrel spilled, meaning that the fine could be as much as $21 billion.

On January 3, 2013, the Department of Justice announced "Transocean Deepwater Inc. has agreed to plead guilty to violating the Clean Water Act and to pay a total of $1.4 billion in civil and criminal fines and penalties". $800 million goes to the Gulf Coast restoration Trust Fund, $300 million to the Oil Spill Liability Trust Fund, $150 million to the National Fish and Wildlife Foundation and $150 million to the National Academy of Sciences. MOEX Offshore 2007 agreed to pay $45 million to the Oil Spill Liability Trust Fund, $25 million to five Gulf state and $20 million to supplemental environmental projects.

== Civil penalties results ==
As a result of the litigation, BP and Transocean Deepwater Inc. were made to pay out a total settlement amount of $20.8 billion on April 4, 2016. In accordance with the RESTORE Act, 80% of the settlement money was dedicated to recovery efforts in the Gulf of Mexico. That portion of the money was partitioned out to the following entities and projects:

- $1.86 billion to be managed by the U.S Treasury and used by the five Gulf states for restoration efforts.
- $1.6 billion to be managed by the Councile Selected Restoration Component, which coordinated a Gulf region spanning restoration effort.
- $1.6 billion set asside to support state programs and initiatives aligning with a "spill impact component".
- $133.3 million to fund research into long-term ecological recovery and sustainable fisheries industries around the Gulf of Mexico, coordinated through NOAA.
- $133.3 million to establish NGO and academic centers of excellence focused on research into science and technology to support further ecological recovery.
- $1.33 billion was added to the Oil Spill Liability Trust fund, a general government fund which had been established in 1986.
