= Russel L. Honoré =

US Army General (born 1947)

Russel Honoré
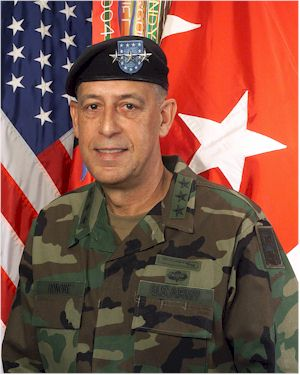
- Born: September 15, 1947 (age 79); Lakeland, Louisiana, U.S.
- Military career
- Allegiance: United States
- Branch: United States Army
- Service years: 1971–2008
- Rank: Lieutenant general
- Nickname: "The Ragin' Cajun"
- Commands: First Army; 2nd Infantry Division
- Awards: Defense Distinguished Service Medal (2); Army Distinguished Service Medal (2); Defense Superior Service Medal; Legion of Merit (5)
- Website: generalhonore.com

Russel Luke Honoré (/ˈɒnəreɪ/ ON-ər-ay; born September 15, 1947) is a retired lieutenant general of the United States Army. He served as the 33rd commanding general of the U.S. First Army at Fort Gillem, Georgia, from 2004 until his retirement in 2008.

Honoré is a native of Louisiana, best known for his role as the commander of Joint Task Force Katrina, the military relief effort for the areas affected by Hurricane Katrina in 2005. His direct and often blunt leadership style during the crisis drew widespread media attention and praise, with New Orleans Mayor Ray Nagin referring to him as a "John Wayne dude".

After retiring from the military, Honoré has been involved in political commentary and disaster preparedness advocacy. He has led environmental activism in Louisiana through his organization, the GreenARMY. In 2021, Speaker of the House Nancy Pelosi appointed Honoré to lead a review of security at the U.S. Capitol following the January 6 attack.

== Early life and education ==
Honoré is a native of Lakeland in Pointe Coupee Parish, Louisiana, and ninth of twelve children, born to a Louisiana Creole family who settled in Pointe Coupée Parish. The Honoré surname is documented as one of the foundational family names of the Cane River Creole community. The historian Gary B. Mills, a leading scholar on Louisiana Creoles, specifically lists the Honoré family among the core group of "free people of color" who settled in the Cane River's Isle Brevelle community.

Honoré earned a B.S. degree in vocational agriculture from Southern University and A&M College in 1971. He also obtained an M.A. in human resources from Troy University in 1992. He has received leadership development training from the international civilian Center for Creative Leadership.

== Career ==
Prior to his appointment on July 15, 2004, as Commander, First United States Army, Honoré served in a variety of command and staff positions in South Korea and Germany. He served as Commanding General, 2nd Infantry Division in South Korea; Vice Director for Operations, J-3, The Joint Staff, Washington, D.C.; Deputy Commanding General and Assistant Commandant, United States Army Infantry Center and School, Fort Benning, Georgia; and Assistant Division Commander, Maneuver/Support, 1st Cavalry Division, Fort Hood, Texas.

On June 13, 2002, in South Korea, soldiers from the 2nd Infantry Division were on a training mission near the North Korean border when their vehicle hit and killed two 14-year-old girls on a narrow public road. In July 2002, the U.S. military indicted Sgt. Mark Walker and Sgt. Fernando Nino on charges of negligent homicide. They were later found not guilty. Honoré (then a major general) responded by visiting the victims' parents and promising the U.S. military would build a memorial near the accident site to honor the girls.

On January 15, 2021, Speaker of the House Nancy Pelosi announced that Honoré would lead a review of security failures following the U.S. Capitol attack that will focus on "security infrastructure, interagency processes and procedures, and command and control".

=== Hurricane response ===
On August 31, 2005, Honoré was designated commander of Joint Task Force Katrina, responsible for coordinating military relief efforts for Hurricane Katrina-affected areas across the Gulf Coast. His arrival in New Orleans followed widespread criticism of the slow and inadequate response by local, state, and federal authorities. The Federal Emergency Management Agency (FEMA) and its director, Michael D. Brown, were specifically criticized for the agency's performance.

Honoré's direct leadership style drew national attention. New Orleans Mayor Ray Nagin praised him in a radio interview, stating, "I give the president some credit on this—he sent one John Wayne dude down here that can get some stuff done, and his name is Gen. Honoré. And he came off the doggone chopper, and he started cussing and people started moving." On September 20, 2005, at a press conference, Honoré told a reporter "You are stuck on stupid. I'm not going to answer that question." in reference to a hypothetical comparison to the Los Angeles riots of 1992. In one widely played video clip, Honoré was on the streets of New Orleans, barking orders to subordinates and, in one case, berating local police officers who were displaying their weapons as they rode past him. "Weapons down! Weapons down, damn it!" Honoré shouted. With both the New Orleans police and the National Guard, he is credited with shifting the focus from a military-style presence to a humanitarian relief mission.

Stars and Stripes, the unofficial newspaper of the United States Armed Forces, reported that Honoré had previous experience dealing with flooding at many South Korean bases during monsoon season and supervised the installation of flood control measures. After Hurricane Maria devastated Puerto Rico in 2017, Honoré described the situation in the U.S. territory as being "like a war" and said it was significantly worse than New Orleans in the aftermath of Katrina. Honoré criticized the Trump administration's response to the crisis, saying it demanded a greater and more rapid response, with a larger commitment of U.S. troops to provide emergency assistance.

=== U.S. Capitol attack security review ===
As a result of the 2021 United States Capitol attack, Speaker Nancy Pelosi announced on January 15, 2021, that Honoré would lead an investigation into the incident. He suggested that fencing should be installed and discussed shortcomings in security. He was vocal on Twitter about the response of the United States Capitol Police officers, calling it a "shit show".

In a letter to Speaker Nancy Pelosi by Representative Matt Gaetz, he was criticized for statements he made in regard to certain members of Congress, specifically for Senator Josh Hawley to be "run out of D.C." and Representative Lauren Boebert needing to be put on a no-fly list.

=== Politics ===
In late August 2009, there were reports that Honoré would run for U.S. Senate in 2010 in his native Louisiana as a Republican against incumbent Republican Senator David Vitter. On August 31, when asked on CNN about the reports, Honoré expressed admiration for individuals who aspire to serve in public office but said that he had no plans to seek the Senate seat, as he was unlikely to win with the viewpoints he currently holds.

== Personal life ==
Honoré describes himself as an "African-American Creole", a combination that includes French, African, Native American, and Spanish ancestry. He was raised Catholic.

Honoré resides in Baton Rouge, Louisiana with his wife, Beverly, and their four children. He founded the GreenARMY, an environmental coalition focused on Louisiana. He has criticized excessive groundwater use by ExxonMobil and Georgia-Pacific in Baton Rouge, and their close relationship with the Capital Area Groundwater Conservation Commission that oversees and regulates water use by these corporations.

== Recognition ==
During the halftime of the Independence Bowl in Shreveport, Louisiana, on December 30, 2005, he was honored with the Omar N. Bradley "Spirit of Independence Award" because of his leadership in the recovery of New Orleans after Hurricane Katrina. On the third anniversary of the storm, he was honored with a tribute at the New Orleans City Council for his service to the city. Honoré received an honorary D.P.A. degree in Public Policy from Southern University and A&M College in 2003. In 2006, Stillman College awarded him both an honorary LL.D. in Laws and an honorary L.H.D. in Humane Letters. He later received additional honorary LL.D. degrees from Virginia State University in 2008, Loyola University New Orleans in 2009, and Meharry Medical College in 2010.

His military awards and decorations include:

- Defense Distinguished Service Medal with one oak leaf cluster
- Army Distinguished Service Medal with one oak leaf cluster
- Defense Superior Service Medal
- Legion of Merit with four oak leaf clusters
- Bronze Star
- Defense Meritorious Service Medal
- Meritorious Service Medal with three oak leaf clusters
- Army Commendation Medal with three oak leaf clusters
- Army Achievement Medal
- Joint Meritorious Unit Award with two oak leaf clusters
- Army Superior Unit Award
- National Defense Service Medal with two service stars
- Armed Forces Expeditionary Medal
- Southwest Asia Service Medal with one service star
- Global War on Terrorism Service Medal
- Korean Defense Service Medal
- Armed Forces Service Medal
- Humanitarian Service Medal
- Army Service Ribbon
- Overseas Service Ribbon with award numeral 4
- Kuwait Liberation Medal (Saudi Arabia)
- Kuwait Liberation Medal (Kuwait)
- Expert Infantryman Badge
- Basic Parachutist Badge
- Office of the Joint Chiefs of Staff Identification Badge

== See also ==
- List of Louisiana Creoles
- List of Southern University alumni
- List of Troy University alumni
