= This Week in Politics =

- Also known as: This Week...
- Directed by: Reza Baktar
- Starring: Tom Foreman and various contributors
- Country of origin: United States
- Original language: English

Production
- Running time: 60 minutes

Original release
- Network: CNN
- Release: June 10, 2006 – present

This Week in Politics is a weekly political news and talk program on CNN.

Originally started as This Week at War, the program focused on the week's news regarding U.S.-involved wars, security in the United States, and terrorism.

Due to much excitement over the 2008 presidential election season, the title was changed to This Week in Politics in January 2008. Airing on CNN/US, the program appeared at 6 p.m. ET Saturdays and 2 p.m. ET Sundays, hosted by Tom Foreman.

== Timeline ==
- Iraq: A Week at War with Wolf Blitzer (June 10, 2006)
- This Week at War with John Roberts (June 17, 2006 - April 14, 2007) and Tom Foreman (April 21, 2007 - January 12, 2008)
- This Week in Politics with Tom Foreman (February 23, 2008 - October 25, 2008)
- After Party: Where Do We Go from Here? with Donna Brazile, David Brody, Stephen Hayes and Hilary Rosen (November 8, 2008 - January 3, 2009)
