= Holly Meowy =

American actress

- Born: Holly Michelle King; Hollywood, Los Angeles, California, U.S.
- Occupations: Actress, model, television personality, professional wrestling manager
- Years active: 2001–present
- Professional wrestling career
- Ring name(s): Kitty, the Beautiful Brenda
- Debut: 2013

Holly Michelle Meowy is an American actress, TV personality, model, and professional wrestling manager. She is best known for her work as the Beautiful Brenda on Lucha Underground.

== TV and film ==
Meowy appeared in various low-budget films, such as Survivor: Los Angeles the Ultimate Parody (2001), Vampire Survivor (2002), I Love Your Work (2003), and Beat Boys Beat Girls (2003).

Meowy appeared as a contestant/Houseguest on the fifth season of CBS's Big Brother US in 2004. She was evicted in Week 3.

Meowy also appeared on the reality based television show, MTV's Fear. Accompanied by four other contestants (including future America's Next Top Model runner up Mercedes Scelba-Shorte), Meowy was brought to Hopkins Military Academy which has been reported to be haunted. Over the course of the program Meowy and the other contestants were directed to do a series of dares. Meowy was one of three contestants that won $5000 for lasting the whole two nights and completing all six dares.

Meowy is also known for being "Gear Girl" on the National Lampoon Networks TV series Gamers. The weekly show discusses various aspects of video gaming. She's also done guest appearances on TV shows, such as Nip/Tuck on FX, NBC's Las Vegas, CBS's Two and a Half Men.

== Professional wrestling ==
Meowy stepped into the world of professional wrestling in 2013 after being cast for the relaunch of the Women of Wrestling series. Her character was named Kitty, and she was paired with the returning Lana Star as her personal assistant. She accompanied Lana during her matches for season 2 and 3 of the program.

In 2016, Meowy appeared on season 2 of Lucha Underground as the Beautiful Brenda and was the valet of Famous B. She accompanied him as they both managed the likes of Mascarita Sagrada and Dr. Wagner Jr. She reprised her role for season 3, once again managing Famous B and Wagner Jr.

During the Cuerto Cup Tournament her arm along with Famous B was broken by Pentagon Dark who defeated Texano in Round 3 of the tournament.

In season 4, she started to manage Big Bad Steve.
