= Darrel J. Papillion =

American judge (born 1968)

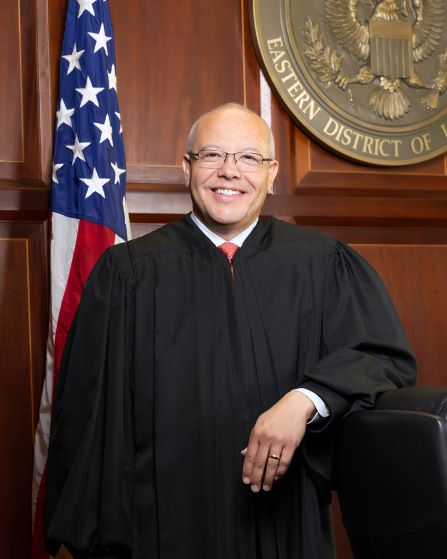

Judge of the United States District Court for the Eastern District of Louisiana
- Incumbent
- Assumed office June 1, 2023
- Appointed by: Joe Biden
- Preceded by: Carl Barbier

Personal details
- Born: Darrel James Papillion; 1968 (age 57–58) Eunice, Louisiana, U.S.
- Education: Louisiana State University (BA, JD)

Darrel James Papillion (born 1968) is an American lawyer from Louisiana who serves as a United States district judge of the United States District Court for the Eastern District of Louisiana.

== Early life and education ==
Papillion was born in 1968 in Eunice, Louisiana. He received a Bachelor of Arts from Louisiana State University and A&M College in 1990 and a Juris Doctor from the Paul M. Hebert Law Center at Louisiana State University in 1994.

== Career ==
From 1994 to 1995, Papillion served as a law clerk for Associate Justice Catherine D. Kimball of the Louisiana Supreme Court. From 1995 to 1999, he was an associate at McGlinchey Stafford A.P.L.C. and from 1999 to 2001, he was an associate at Moore, Walters & Thompson, A.P.L.C. From 2001 to 2009, he was a partner at Moore, Walters, Thompson, Thomas, Papillion & Cullens, A.P.L.C. From 2009 to 2023, he was a partner with Walters, Papillion, Thomas, Cullens, LLC in Baton Rouge, Louisiana. As a lawyer, he focused on product liability, personal injury, and wrongful death cases. Since 2000, he has been an adjunct professor at Paul M. Hebert Law Center and from 2005 to 2006 he was an adjunct professor at Southern University Law Center.

From 2013 to 2014, he was president of the Baton Rouge Bar Association and from 2016 to 2017 he served as president of the Louisiana State Bar Association. From 2020 until becoming a federal judge, Papillion served on the Board of Directors of the Innocence Project of New Orleans.

=== Notable cases ===
- Papillion served as co-counsel in Johnson v. Ardoin, a Voting Rights Act challenge to Louisiana's 2011 congressional districts. Papillion represented the plaintiffs, nine African American voters who alleged the congressional map violated Section 2 of the Voting Rights Act.
- Papillion represented plaintiffs in English v. Ardoin seeking declaratory and injunctive relief preventing Louisiana's Secretary of State from using the 2010 congressional districts reapportionment and redistricting map. The plaintiffs claimed the plan was violating the United States and Louisiana constitutions.

=== Federal judicial service ===
On March 20, 2023, President Joe Biden announced his intent to nominate Papillion to serve as a United States district judge of the United States District Court for the Eastern District of Louisiana. On March 21, 2023, his nomination was sent to the Senate. President Biden nominated Papillion to the seat vacated by Judge Carl Barbier, who assumed senior status on January 1, 2023. He had the support of Senators Bill Cassidy and John Kennedy. On April 18, 2023, a hearing on his nomination was held before the Senate Judiciary Committee. During his confirmation hearing, he was questioned by Senators Mike Lee and Marsha Blackburn over his role in prosecuting Tony Spell, a Louisiana pastor who defied state restrictions during the COVID-19 pandemic. On May 11, 2023, his nomination was reported out of committee by a 15–6 vote. On May 17, 2023, the United States Senate invoked cloture on his nomination by a 63–33 vote. On May 30, 2023, his nomination was confirmed by a 59–31 vote. He received his judicial commission on June 1, 2023.

== Personal life ==
He married his wife, Shirley, in 1991 at St. Joan of Arc Catholic Church in Oberlin, Louisiana. In 2018, Papillion was considered for an earlier bench opening but withdrew from consideration when his wife was diagnosed with cancer and later died. Papillion is Catholic.

== See also ==
- List of African-American federal judges
- List of African-American jurists

Legal offices
Preceded by Carl Barbier	Judge of the United States District Court for the Eastern District of Louisiana; 2023–present	Incumbent
