= Frederick Jacob Reagan Heebe =

American judge (1922-2014)

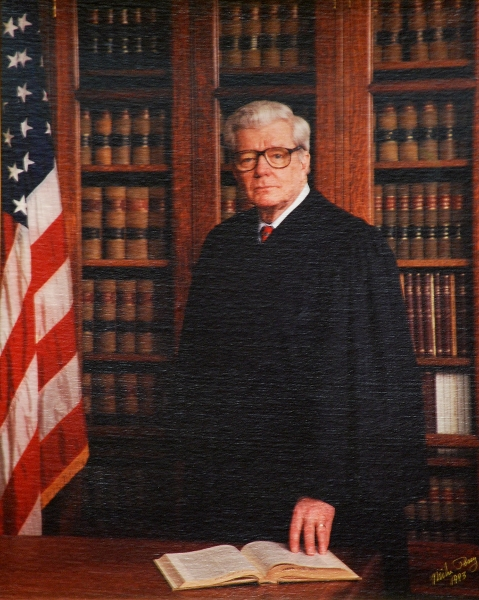

Senior Judge of the United States District Court for the Eastern District of Louisiana
- In office August 26, 1992 – August 10, 2014

Chief Judge of the United States District Court for the Eastern District of Louisiana
- In office 1972–1992
- Preceded by: Elmer Gordon West
- Succeeded by: Morey Leonard Sear

Judge of the United States District Court for the Eastern District of Louisiana
- In office March 26, 1966 – August 26, 1992
- Appointed by: Lyndon B. Johnson
- Preceded by: Frank Burton Ellis
- Succeeded by: Okla Jones II

Personal details
- Born: Frederick Jacob Reagan Heebe; August 25, 1922 Gretna, Louisiana, U.S.
- Died: August 10, 2014 (aged 91) Metairie, Louisiana, U.S.
- Party: Democratic
- Education: Tulane University (BA); Tulane University (LLB)

Frederick Jacob Reagan Heebe (August 25, 1922 – August 10, 2014) was an American lawyer and jurist who served as a district judge of the United States District Court for the Eastern District of Louisiana.

== Early life and education ==
Born in Gretna, Louisiana, Heebe received a Bachelor of Arts degree from Tulane University in 1943 and was a captain in the United States Army towards the end of World War II from 1945 to 1946. He received a Bachelor of Laws from Tulane University Law School in 1949.

== Career ==
Heebe worked in private practice in Gretna from 1949 to 1958. He was a member from 1958 to 1960 of the Jefferson Parish Council. He was a judge of Division B of the 24th Judicial District Court in Jefferson Parish from 1961 to 1966.

=== Federal judicial service ===
On February 16, 1966, Heebe was nominated by President Lyndon B. Johnson to a seat on the United States District Court for the Eastern District of Louisiana vacated by Judge Frank Burton Ellis. Heebe was confirmed by the United States Senate on March 25, 1966 and received his commission the following day. He served as Chief Judge from 1972 to 1992, assuming senior status on August 26, 1992.

== Personal life ==
Heebe died on August 10, 2014, in Metairie, Louisiana.

== See also ==
- List of United States federal judges by longevity of service

== Sources ==
Legal offices
| Preceded by Frank Burton Ellis | Judge of the United States District Court for the Eastern District of Louisiana; 1966–1992 | Succeeded by Okla Jones II |
| Preceded by Elmer Gordon West | Chief Judge of the United States District Court for the Eastern District of Louisiana; 1972–1992 | Succeeded by Morey Leonard Sear |
