= Joint Task Force Katrina =

U.S. government disaster recovery operation

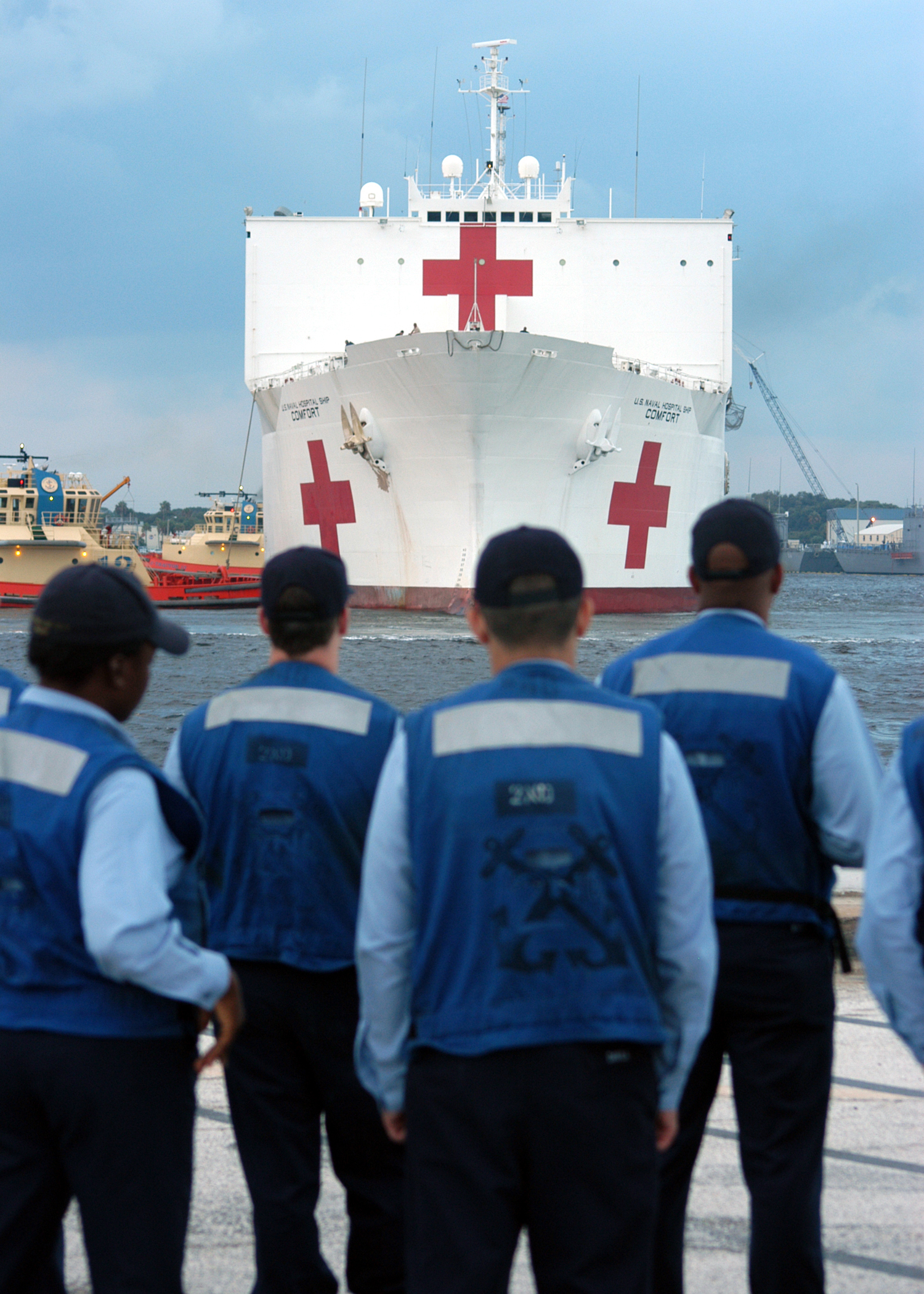
The USNS Comfort takes on supplies en route to aid victims of Hurricane Katrina.

Joint Task Force Katrina was a joint operation between the United States Department of Defense and the Federal Emergency Management Agency created on September 1, 2005, at Camp Shelby, Mississippi to organize relief efforts along the Gulf Coast in the aftermath of Hurricane Katrina. The operation was headed by U.S. Army Lieutenant General Russel L. Honoré. Joint Task Force Katrina took over operations from United States Northern Command that had some elements in place before Hurricane Katrina struck the Gulf Coast.

Included in this was a joint mission of USAF Reserve Security Forces personnel at Kelly Air Force Base, San Antonio, Texas. Their mission was to protect Air Force resources and personnel if the displaced persons being housed in shelters at Kelly AFB were to cause a civil disturbance.

== History ==
JTF Katrina was established the day after Hurricane Katrina finished its path through the Gulf coast. It was established on September 1, 2005, to coordinate the Department of Defense (DOD) and Federal Emergency Management Agency (FEMA) relief plans for the areas effected by Hurricane Katrina. At its creation Joint Task Force Katrina had about 7,000 National Guardsmen in Mississippi, 10,000 in Alabama, 6,500 in Louisiana, and 8,200 in Florida ready for duty. These troops had originally been put in place by Northern Command. First actions taken were flying helicopters for medical- evacuations that were started on September 1. The aircraft for these operations came from across the United States. Some came from as far as California to help in the relief effort. Pilots of these aircraft orders ranged from flying along the coastline looking for survivors and transporting food, water, and medical supplies to all of the refuge camps across the Gulf.

Numerous Naval ships were sent to assist in the aid of the Gulf. for instance the Iwo Jima amphibious Readiness Group sailed from Virginia which consisted of the USS Iwo Jima (LHD-7), USS Shreveport (LPD-12), USS Tortuga (LSD-46) and USNS Arctic (T-AOE-8). The ships were loaded with disaster response equipment which went to Louisiana. In addition, the USNS Comfort (T-AH-20) came from Maryland to give medical supplies to the relief effort. The USS Grapple (ARS 53) also was called in to do underwater salvaging of flooded areas throughout the Gulf coast.

Multiple working staging areas were set up on multiple air force bases that included Maxwell Air Force Base, Alabama; Naval Air Station Meridian, Mississippi; Barksdale Air Force Base, Louisiana; Alexandria, Louisiana; and Fort Polk, Louisiana. These were set up to speed up movement of supplies and soldiers to get to needed areas. Joint Task Force Katrina eventually was relocated from Camp Shelby to the Iwo Jima that was in port in New Orleans. The United States Military also had 355 helicopters and 93 planes to the relief effort. Not including the 63,000 Active Soldiers that were also contributing to the cause.
