= Delphine Feminear Thomas =

American educator (1890–1963)

- Delphine Feminear Thomas, from a 1941 newspaper.
- Born: Delphine Feminear; October 1, 1890; Bay Minette, Alabama
- Died: July 22, 1963 (aged 72); Auburn, Alabama
- Other name: Mrs. A. L. Thomas
- Occupation: Educator

Delphine Feminear Thomas (October 1, 1890 – July 22, 1963) was an American educator and civic leader in Auburn, Alabama.

== Early life ==
Delphine Feminear was born in Bay Minette, Alabama, the daughter of Joseph Feminear and Delphine Byrne Feminear. She graduated from Troy State Normal School in 1910. She attended a summer program for teachers at the University of Alabama in 1914.

== Career ==
Feminear was a high school teacher in rural Pike County, Alabama as a young woman. In 1913 she became principal of a school in Edgewater, a mining community near Birmingham. In 1915 she presented a paper on "Homes for Rural Teachers", and was elected vice president of the Alabama Educational Association, and the association's meeting in Montgomery. From 1919 Thomas was an assistant in the English department at Auburn University. While at Auburn, she volunteered as a nurse during the 1918 flu pandemic. She taught junior high school at the Marietta Johnson School of Organic Education in Fairhope in 1930.

Thomas organized Auburn's first Girl Scout troop and the first girls' 4-H Club programs, and was active in politics, the Alabama Congress of Parents and Teachers, Auburn Methodist Church, and American Red Cross work. Her 1938 essay, "Some Facts About the Alabama Poll Tax Laws", was printed in newspapers statewide. She served on the Alabama State Personnel Board from 1941 to 1953. "She has made herself a place in the grateful affections of thousands who live in the rural districts on account of her work with canning clubs and in supervising rural schools," according to a 1916 report.

== Personal life ==
In 1916, Delphine Feminear married engineering professor Albert Lee Thomas (1885–1963). They had a son, Albert Lee Thomas Jr. (1923–1996), and a daughter, Delphine Thomas Cain. She died in Auburn in 1963, a few weeks after her husband, aged 72 years. In 1977, Thomas was nominated for the Alabama Women's Hall of Fame, as a notable educator and community leader.
