= Adria Montgomery-Klein and Natalie Montgomery-Carroll =

Twin sister fitness models and competitors

Adria Montgomery-Klein
- Born: June 24, 1974 (age 51)
- Television: Big Brother 5 (7th place)

Natalie Montgomery-Carroll
- Born: June 24, 1974 (age 51)
- Television: Big Brother 5 (8th place)

Adria Montgomery-Klein and Natalie Montgomery-Carroll (born June 24, 1974) are twin sisters who are fitness competitors, fitness trainers, professional models, and reality TV contestants. They gained widespread national exposure on Big Brother 5, a reality TV show in the United States which aired on CBS in 2004.

== Early life ==
The twins attended Midfield High School, where they played softball. After graduating high school in 1992, they attended Troy State University in Troy, Alabama, where they each received Bachelor of Science degrees in computer science and minors in business and American Sign Language. They continued playing softball during college. After graduating, they both went to work at Electronic Data Systems. While still working for EDS, they began participating in fitness competitions.

Adria married Lenny Klein in 1998. Natalie married Breck Carroll in 2000; the Carrolls separated in 2008 and later divorced.

The twins' first significant success as competitors was in 1998, when Natalie placed first and Adria placed second in the Ms. Fitness Kentucky event. They quit EDS to focus entirely on fitness training in 2000.

== Fitness competition and training ==
Starting in 2000, the twins signed up with HealthSouth Corporation, to go on a Roadshow Nationwide Tour called Go For It!, teaching fitness and nutrition to people, particularly middle school students. Along with this was a TV show for students called Go For It! TV, which they appeared on as competition coaches. After doing Go For It! for three years (the TV show for two), they continued with fitness competitions.

The twins have since opened the Fitness Twins Elite Training Studio.

== Big Brother 5 ==
In 2004, the twins appeared on the Big Brother 5 reality TV show as a single person named "Adria Okins". In the show, a group of contestants compete against one another to remain in the house as long as possible, as one person is evicted through a vote each week by fellow contestants. The fact that "Adria Okins" was really two different people was kept secret from fellow contestants for five weeks. This was done as part of the season's theme of "Do Not Assume (DNA)". Once the secret was revealed, they competed openly as two separate people. However, the negative feelings towards being deceived, in addition to the two being perceived as an aligned unit rather than two separate players, helped cause the two to be evicted soon afterwards, with Natalie being the first twin removed, and Adria next. Six other contestants remained after their evictions.

== Magazine appearances ==
The twins have appeared in the following publications:

- Muscle & Fitness (April 2003) – Featured in article "Muscle Twins"
- Physical (February 2003) – Appear on cover and article "Training by the Fitness Twins"
- Muscle & Fitness Hers (December 2002) – Featured in article
- Physical (February 2003)
- Oxygen (August 2002) – Featured in article "Snap Shot of the Fitness Twins"
- Physical (July 2002) – Article featured Adria
- Oxygen (June 2002) – Featured in article "Double Take"
- Physical (June 2002) – Mentioned in coverage of the Arnold Classic
- Iron Man March and June 2002 – Featured in article
- Ms. Fitness (Spring 2002) – Cover and featured in article
- Physical (April 2002)
- Ms. Fitness (Winter 2001) – Cover and featured in article
- Physical (September 2001) – Cover and featured in story
- BuckMasters (July 2001) – Featured in article

== Fitness competition results ==
Adria Montgomery-Klein

- National Physique Committee (NPC) World Championships 2002 – Brno, Czech Republic October 2002 (6th place Fitness Tall Class)
- NPC Team Universe Overall and Tall Class Champion 2002
- NPC USA Fitness Championships 2002 – 2nd place in Tall Division
- IFBB Pro Qualifier
- NPC Fitness Nationals 2001 – 6th place
- NPC Carol Semple Fitness Classic 2001- 2nd place
- Ms. Fitness World 2001 Champion
- Ms. Fitness USA 2001 Champion
- Ms. Fitness World 2000 Champion
- Ms. Fitness USA 2000 – 3rd runner up
- Ms. Fitness Hollywood Champion 2001
- Ms. National Fitness Model 2000 Champion
- Ms. Fitness Kentucky 2000 Champion
- Ms. Fitness Indiana 2000 Champion
- Ms. Fitness USA 2000 – placed 16th
- Ms. Fitness Universe 2000 – placed 6th
- Ms. Fitness Kentucky 1999 – 1st runner up

Natalie Montgomery-Carroll

- International Federation of BodyBuilders (IFBB) GNC Show of Strength Invitational Pro Fitness – November 8, 2002 – 11th overall
- IFBB Pittsburgh Pro Fitness Classic 2002 – 15th overall
- IFBB Jan Tana Classic 2002 – 12th overall of 22 contestants
- NPC Fitness Nationals 2001 – 2nd place and IFBB Pro Qualifier
- NPC Carol Semple Fitness Classic 2001 – 1st place
- Ms. Fitness World 2001 – 1st
- Ms. Fitness USA 2001 – 1st
- Ms. Fitness USA 2000 Champion
- Ms. Fitness World 2000 – 2nd runner up
- Ms. Fitness Hollywood 2001 – 1st runner up
- Ms. National Fitness 2000 Champion
- Ms. Fitness Mexico Invitational 2000 Champion
- Ms. Fitness USA 2000, 11th
- Ms. Fitness Universe 2000, 3rd runner up
- Ms. Fitness Kentucky 1999, Champion
