= Big Brother 5 (American season) =

Big Brother
- Season 5
- Big Brother 5 logo
- Hosted by: Julie Chen
- No. of days: 82
- No. of houseguests: 14
- Winner: Drew Daniel
- Runner-up: Michael "Cowboy" Ellis
- Companion show: House Calls
- No. of episodes: 31

Release
- Original network: CBS
- Original release: July 6 – September 21, 2004

Additional information
- Filming dates: July 2 – September 21, 2004

Season chronology
- ← Previous; Season 4 Next → Season 6

Big Brother 5 is the fifth season of the American reality television series Big Brother. It is based upon the Dutch series of the same name, which gained notoriety in 1999 and 2000. The season premiered on CBS on July 6, 2004, and lasted eleven weeks until the live finale on September 21, 2004. This season was the first to be accompanied by the House Calls: The Big Brother Talk Show spin-off series, which was viewable online and discussed the events of the game. The fifth season continued to have the ratings success of the previous season, averaging more than eight million viewers per episode. The Big Brother 5 premiere garnered 9.55 million viewers, almost matching that of the previous season's launch night. Ratings stayed gradually the same, with the finale receiving more than 10 million viewers. The season premiere currently has the third highest ratings for a premiere episode, only behind Big Brother 1 and Big Brother 4. Big Brother 5 featured a total of 14 HouseGuests, an increase from previous editions. The series ended after 82 days, in which HouseGuest Drew Daniel was crowned the Winner, and Michael Ellis the Runner-Up.

== Format ==
The format remained largely unchanged from previous seasons. HouseGuests were sequestered in the Big Brother House with no contact to and from the outside world. Each week, the HouseGuests took part in several compulsory challenges that determined who would win food, luxuries, and power in the House. The winner of the Head of Household competition was immune from nominations and was instructed to nominate two fellow HouseGuests for eviction. After a HouseGuest became Head of Household he or she was ineligible to take part in the next Head of Household competition. HouseGuests also took part in a weekly food competition, with the losing team being placed on the peanut butter and jelly diet for a week. Some competitions allowed all HouseGuests to earn food for the week, while others cause them all to lose food for the week. The winner of the Power of Veto competition won the right to save one of the nominated HouseGuests from eviction. If the Veto winner exercised the power, the Head of Household then had to nominate another HouseGuest for eviction.

On eviction night all HouseGuests except for the Head of Household and the two nominees voted to evict one of the two nominees. Before the voting began the nominees had the chance to record a final message to their fellow HouseGuests. This compulsory vote was conducted in the privacy of the Diary Room by the host Julie Chen. In the event of a tie, the Head of Household would break the tie and reveal their vote in front of the other HouseGuests. Unlike other versions of Big Brother, the HouseGuests could discuss the nomination and eviction process open and freely. The nominee with the most votes from the other HouseGuests was evicted from the House on Thursday and interviewed by Julie Chen. HouseGuests could voluntarily leave the House at any time and those who broke the rules were expelled by Big Brother. The last seven evictees of the season, known as the jury members, voted for the winner on the season finale. The jury members were sequestered in a separate house and were not allowed to watch the show except for segments that included all of the HouseGuests. The jury members were not shown any Diary Room interviews or any footage that included strategy or details regarding nominations.

The season's main theme was titled "Project Do Not Assume", or "Project DNA" for short, and was incorporated through two twists. The first of these twists were that HouseGuests Michael "Cowboy" Ellis and Jennifer "Nakomis" Dedmon were, unbeknownst to them, half-siblings. The two share the same father, whom Ellis had never met. Ellis quickly figured out the twist, and Big Brother later gave the two letters from home explaining the situation. This twist had no impact on the format of the game, other than the personal implications that arise with the situation. The second twist was that a set of twins were switching spots in the house, with the goal of making it to the fifth week. If they succeeded this without getting caught, they would both be eligible to play as individuals. The twins, Adria and Natalie, both played as Adria, and would switch places at various times in the Diary Room. The sisters succeeded in the task, and Natalie entered the game on Day 35. This twist was later implemented in Big Brother 17. This was also the first season to feature a Fast Forward Week (later seasons were called "double eviction" week), where two HouseGuests were evicted in the span of one week with a second HoH and Veto competitions played concurrently during the remainder of the live show. Additionally, this is the first season in which only six people participated in the Power of Veto Competition: the Head Of Household, the two nominees, and three other players selected by the previously mentioned three's choosing.

== HouseGuests ==
Partial cast of the fifth season of Big Brother. Top: Scott, Will, Marvin and Drew Middle: Michael, Holly, Jase, Adria and Mike Bottom: Lori, Karen, Nakomis and Diane Not Pictured: Natalie

Name	Age	Occupation	Residence	Entry	Result
Drew Daniel	22	College graduate	Urbana, Ohio	Day 1	Winner; Day 82
Michael "Cowboy" Ellis	23	Security officer	Durant, Oklahoma	Day 1	Runner-up; Day 82
Diane Henry	22	Cocktail waitress	Burlington, Kentucky	Day 1	Evicted; Day 78
Jennifer "Nakomis" Dedmon	21	Waitress	San Antonio, Texas	Day 1	Evicted; Day 75
Karen Ganci	30	Portrait artist	Saddle Brook, New Jersey	Day 1	Evicted; Day 70
Marvin Latimer	36	Mortician	Conway, South Carolina	Day 1	Evicted; Day 65
Adria Klein	30	Fitness professional	Birmingham, Alabama	Day 1	Evicted; Day 63
Natalie Carroll	30	Fitness professional	Birmingham, Alabama	Day 35	Evicted; Day 56
Will Wikle	25	Registered nurse	Tupelo, Mississippi	Day 1	Evicted; Day 49
Jason "Jase" Wirey	28	Volunteer firefighter	Decatur, Illinois	Day 1	Evicted; Day 42
Scott Long	24	Sales representative	Pittsburgh, Pennsylvania	Day 1	Evicted; Day 35
Holly King	26	Model	Los Angeles, California	Day 1	Evicted; Day 28
Lori Valenti	26	Yoga instructor	Boston, Massachusetts	Day 1	Evicted; Day 21
Mike Lubinski	41	Painter	Eastpointe, Michigan	Day 1	Evicted; Day 14

=== Future appearances ===
Holly King appeared on Big Brother 6 to host a Power of Veto competition. Diane Henry, Jennifer "Nakomis" Dedmon, and Jase Wirey all returned to compete on Big Brother: All-Stars in 2006. Michael "Cowboy" Ellis was a candidate to return for Big Brother: All Stars, but ultimately was not chosen. Marvin Latimer and Scott Long returned to Big Brother: All Stars to participate in various competitions as well. Jase later made an appearance on Big Brother 10 to participate in a food competition. Michael was also a candidate to return for Big Brother 11 in 2009, but ultimately did not enter the game. Jase Wirey was one of four international Big Brother alumni up for a public vote to compete in the fourth season of Big Brother Canada but was not selected.

== Summary ==
On Day 1, the original thirteen HouseGuests entered the house. That same night, the HouseGuests competed as a group in the "Hungry Hungry Helix" food competition. For this competition, HouseGuests had 75 seconds to crawl through a rotating helix DNA strand with small yellow balls attached to it. Each ball had the name of a food item on it, and each ball they managed to get across the helix would serve as an eatable food for that week; everyone except Holly successfully earned food for the group. During the competition, Lori obtained the "lobster tail" ball, which she was later instructed to keep. For finding this ball, Lori was offered $10,000 in exchange for putting the house on the peanut butter and jelly diet for the week; she accepted this offer, earning the prize. On Day 2, Drew, Jase, Michael, and Scott formed the "Four Hoursemen" alliance. That same day, Karen, Lori, and Will formed an alliance as they feared Jase and Scott as a duo. Michael later discovered that Nakomis was his sister, but chose not to reveal this to anyone yet. That night, HouseGuests competed in the "Treadmills of Terror" Head of Household competition. HouseGuests paired up, with one member of the team answering questions while the other walked on a treadmill. Each question that a HouseGuest's partner missed caused their treadmill to speed up, and the last pair remaining would be finalists for the title. Due to an uneven number of HouseGuests, Will chose to sit out from the competition. Jase and Scott were the finalists, and it was then revealed that Will would ask them a tie-breaker question to determine the winner; Jase correctly answered, and became the first Head of Household of the season.

Shortly after the competition, Michael revealed to Jase and Scott that Nakomis was his sister, and they convinced him to tell her. Big Brother revealed the twist to all of the HouseGuests later that night. On Day 4, the HouseGuests competed in the "Margarita Madness" luxury competition, in which they competed for the hot tub. HouseGuests worked together to build an oversized margarita, and if they completed the task within ten minutes they would earn the hot tub and a margarita party; they were successful, and earned both luxuries. Mike later began attempting to form an alliance to "protect themselves" from the stronger players. On Day 6, Jase chose to nominate Mike and Nakomis for eviction, with Mike as his main target. On Day 8, the HouseGuests competed in the Power of Veto competition; Jase chose Scott to play in the competition, with Mike and Nakomis choosing Holly and Drew respectively. In the "Flaringo Toss" Power of Veto competition, HouseGuests attempted to make their hoola hoops land on a decorative flamingo in the backyard. They would then receive a score depending on the area where their flamingo landed. The thrower would then challenge another player. If that player got a higher score, the challenger was eliminated, and if they failed to match the score, they were eliminated. If the two tied, both remained in the game. Ultimately, Scott won the Power of Veto. On Day 10, he chose to leave nominations intact. On Day 14, Mike became the first HouseGuest to be evicted from the house in a unanimous vote of ten to zero.

Following Mike's eviction, HouseGuests competed in the "Majority Rules" Head of Household competition. For this competition, players had to answer questions while attempting to remain in the majority. If they answered outside of the majority, they were eliminated. When it came down to Holly, Lori, Marvin, and Michael, Marvin correctly answered the tie-breaker question, thus became the new Head of Household. On Day 15, HouseGuests competed in the "Catapoultry" food competition. For this competition, HouseGuests found the backyard had been turned into a barnyard. They would try and shoot rubber chickens into various "nests" representing food items lined up on the wall. If a chicken landed in a nest, they would earn those food items for the week. There was also a space, the "bad egg", in which landing a chicken in it would result in the house losing all of the obtained food items. Will landed a chicken in this spot, though they managed to gain some food back. Later that day, Marvin chose to nominate Holly and Lori for eviction, citing them as two of the most influential players in the game. Following these nominations, Lori's allies secured the five votes they needed for her to stay in the game. When picking players for the Veto, Marvin chose Drew, Holly chose Jase, and Lori chose Karen. The group then competed in the "Snag the Veto" Power of Veto competition. For this competition, HouseGuests had to untangle a rope and successfully pull a Veto symbol out of the tangled rope. Jase was the first to complete the task, narrowly beating Lori, and he earned the Power of Veto for the week. On Day 18, Jase chose to use the Power of Veto on Holly, with Karen being nominated in her place. On Day 21, Lori became the second HouseGuest to be evicted from the house in a vote of seven to two.

Following Lori's eviction, HouseGuests competed in the "High/Low" Head of Household competition. HouseGuests were given a statement about the game that involved a number, and HouseGuests had to determine whether the answer was higher or lower than the given number by stepping upward on downward on a staircase. Ultimately, Drew was the winner of the competition. On Day 22, HouseGuests competed in the "Alphabet Soup" food competition. To win food for the week, HouseGuests were required to leap into a giant bowl of tomato flavored Alphabet Soup, grabbing letters that spell a type of food. The group won whatever foods they spelled correctly for the week. That same day, Drew chose to nominate Holly and Nakomis for eviction, a decision which immediately formed a rift in the Four Horsemen alliance. When picking players for the Power of Veto, Drew chose Scott, Holly chose Jase, and Nakomis chose Natalie (pretending to be Adria). The HouseGuests then played in the "Bluff Me a Veto" Power of Veto competition. For this competition, each player had a turn as a "dealer." They drew a card with a question and answer printed on it. The answer is a truthful response that had previously given to that question on a questionnaire. They read the question to the other five HouseGuests and either read the truthful answer or bluff a different answer. The HouseGuests had to decide whether that person is telling the truth or bluffing. They signified whether they believe or not by placing a bet with a giant chip in front of them that either reads "Bluff' or "Truth." If the HouseGuest guessed correctly they got to keep their chip. If they were wrong, the "dealer" got to keep their chip. The winner was the HouseGuest with the most chips at the end of two rounds. Ultimately, Nakomis was the winner of the Power of Veto. On Day 25, Nakomis chose to use the Power of Veto on herself, with Adria being named the replacement nominee. On Day 28, Holly became the third HouseGuest to be evicted from the house in a vote of seven to one.

Following Holly's eviction, the HouseGuests competed in the "I Have a Secret" endurance Head of Household competition. The competition saw the HouseGuests standing on a small pedestal by a life-size cutout of themselves. Without crossing a black line by their feet, they had to hold a finger over a button on top of their mouths on the cutout. If a HouseGuest took their hand off the button, they were eliminated. As the game progressed, various rules were added, such as they could not change hands or not raise their feet off of the pedestal. Diane won the competition after nearly nine hours, becoming the first female Head of Household of the season. Due to the endurance Head of Household, no food competition was held that week. On Day 29, Diane chose to nominate Jase and Scott for eviction. When picking players for the Power of Veto competition, Diane chose Will, Jase chose Michael, and Scott chose Drew. The HouseGuests then competed in the "This Little Piggy Won the Veto" Power of Veto competition. For this competition, each player had ten Veto chips to distribute into six ceramic pigs representing a HouseGuest. They had to use the chips on at least two pigs. The pig closest to having 20 chips inside of it without going over would be the Veto winner. Ultimately, Jase was the winner of the competition. He later made the decision to remove himself from the block, with Marvin becoming the replacement nominee. On Day 35, Scott became the fourth HouseGuest to be evicted from the house in a vote of four to three. Moments later, the HouseGuests learned of the twins twist, and Natalie entered the house as an official HouseGuest.

Following Scott's eviction, HouseGuests competed in the "Home Is Where the Answer Is" Head of Household competition. For this competition, HouseGuests were asked true or false questions about the Big Brother house. If a HouseGuest answered incorrectly, they were eliminated, with the last HouseGuest standing being the winner; Nakomis was the winner of the competition. On Day 36, HouseGuests competed in the "Fast Times and Custard Pie" food competition. For this competition, HouseGuests had to eat various disgusting pies in an attempt to find an "eat" card, which would grant that HouseGuest food for the week. Ultimately, Adria, Diane, Jase, and Drew were on the peanut butter and jelly diet for the week. Before nominations, Nakomis came up with the "Six Finger Plan" in which she would nominate two of her allies. During the Veto competition, she and her allies would choose three other allies, thus ensuring a member of their team won the Power of Veto. When the Veto was used, she hoped to nominate Jase as the replacement nominee, with the plan ensuring that he could not play for the Power of Veto. On Day 36, Nakomis set forth the plan, nominating Diane and Marvin for eviction. When picking players for the Power of Veto competition, Nakomis chose Adria, Marvin chose Will, and Diane chose Drew. The HouseGuests then competed in the "Pop Goes the Veto" Power of Veto competition. For this competition, HouseGuests threw darts at a wheel of balloons, which were later revealed to have the faces of the competing HouseGuests behind them. When all of a HouseGuests balloons had been popped, they were eliminated from the competition; Drew was the eventual winner of the Power of Veto. Drew later chose to remove Diane from the block, with Jase being nominated as the replacement nominee. On Day 42, Jase became the fifth person to be evicted from the house in a vote of six to one.

Following Jase's eviction, HouseGuests competed in "The Puck Stops Here" Head of Household competition. For this competition, the HouseGuests had to shoot a puck down a shuffleboard with various rubber bands attached to it. Their goal was to aim for a blue space on the board. Adria was the closest to the blue spot, thus became the new Head of Household. On Day 43, HouseGuests competed in the "Backyard Burger Bonanza" food competition. For this, the HouseGuests split into two teams of four, and the teams had to assemble numerous hamburgers from across the yard. The team who made the most hamburgers would earn food for the week. The competition led to Diane, Drew, Marvin, and Natalie being on the peanut butter and jelly diet for the week. This made it the second consecutive week that Drew and Diane were on the diet. That same day, Adria chose to nominate Marvin and Will for eviction. When picking players for the Power of Veto competition, Adria chose Drew, Will chose Diane and Marvin chose Michael. HouseGuests then competed in the "A Very Veto Christmas" Power of Veto competition. For this competition, HouseGuests traded Christmas presents that were worth a certain number of Veto points. The player with the highest total of Veto points at the end of the competition would be the Veto winner; Adria won the Veto. The HouseGuests later competed in the "Admit One" luxury competition, in which Diane, Drew, and Will earned the right to watch the comedy film Without A Paddle. Later that week, Adria chose to leave the nominations intact. On Day 49, Will became the sixth HouseGuest to be evicted from the house, with Adria breaking a tie to evict him. He was the first member of the Jury of Seven.

Following Will's eviction, HouseGuests competed in the "Who Said It?" Head of Household competition. For this competition, HouseGuests answered questions based on statements made by the previously evicted HouseGuests. If a HouseGuest answered incorrectly, they were eliminated from the competition, with the last HouseGuest remaining becoming the winner. Ultimately, Nakomis became Head of Household for the second time this season. On Day 50, HouseGuests competed in the "Smoothies from hell" food competition. For this, HouseGuests were required to put their favorite meals in a blender, and were required to drink the meal. If a HouseGuest successfully completed the task, they would earn food for the day of the week that they represented. Ultimately, the HouseGuests earned food for every day of the week except for Saturday. That same day, Nakomis chose to nominate Adria and Natalie, due to Adria's betrayal the previous week. The HouseGuests later participated in "The Web" luxury competition, in which Diane won a $1,000 online shopping spree. When picking players for the Power of Veto competition, Nakomis chose Marvin, Adria chose Drew, and Natalie chose Michael. The HouseGuests then competed in the "Mug Shot" Power of Veto competition. For this competition, the faces of three different HouseGuests were combined to form one, and the HouseGuest who could successfully figure out which three HouseGuests composed each of the six pictures would win the Power of Veto. Ultimately, Adria won the Power of Veto for the second consecutive week. She later chose to use the power to save herself, with Nakomis choosing to nominate Michael in her place. On Day 56, Natalie became the seventh HouseGuest to be evicted from the house in a vote of four to one. She was the second member of the Jury of Seven.

Following Natalie's eviction, HouseGuests competed in the "Putting for Power" Head of Household competition. For this competition, the HouseGuests split up into two groups composed of three HouseGuests each. HouseGuests then attempted to get a ball in the hole against an uphill course. The first from each group to successfully get a ball into a hole would advance to the final round. Marvin and Michael advanced to the final round, in which the person who sunk the most balls in sixty seconds would become the new Head of Household. Marvin managed to get more than Michael, making Marvin the Head of Household for the second time this season. On Day 57, Marvin chose to nominate Adria and Michael for eviction. When picking players for the Power of Veto competition, Marvin chose Drew, Adria chose Karen, and Michael chose Nakomis. The HouseGuests then competed in the "Ice Ice Veto" Power of Veto competition. For this competition, HouseGuests had to use a "Super Soaker Gun" to try and free the Veto medallion from a frozen block of ice. There is also a "T", in which they can open a toolbox to help free the Veto quicker. The first HouseGuest to get the Veto medallion would be the winner of the Power of Veto. Ultimately, Karen was the winner of the Power of Veto, giving Karen her first win of the season. Karen later decided to leave Adria and Michael nominated for eviction. On Day 63, Adria became the eighth HouseGuest to be evicted from the house in a unanimous vote of four to zero. She was the third member of the Jury of Seven.

Following Adria's eviction, HouseGuests competed in the "Chemical Reaction" Head of Household competition. For this competition, HouseGuests answered questions about previous events in the game. They would answer by pouring chemicals into a container; if they were incorrect, their chemical would remain the same, while a correct answer would turn the chemical blue. Drew was the winner of the competition, making it the second time he had held the title. Following his win, the HouseGuests learned that it would be a Double Eviction week, and that an eviction would occur the following day. That night, he chose to nominate Diane and Marvin for eviction. On Day 65, HouseGuests competed in the "Bounced" Power of Veto competition. For this competition, HouseGuests attempted to bounce balls into a hoop in the fastest time; Diane was the winner. She chose to use the Power of Veto to save herself, with Nakomis being nominated as the replacement nominee. That same night, Marvin became the ninth HouseGuest to be evicted from the house in a unanimous vote of three to zero. He was the fourth member of the Jury of Seven. Following Marvin's eviction, HouseGuests competed in the "Ready, Set, Gone" Head of Household competition. For this competition, HouseGuests had to answer questions about items that had gone missing from the house. Nakomis was the winner of the competition, making her the first person this season to hold the title three times. On Day 65, Nakomis chose to nominate Drew and Michael for eviction. On Day 66, the HouseGuests competed in the "Caged" Power of Veto competition. For this competition, HouseGuests had to make a device that could get them the keys to unlock a cage, thus earning the Veto. Diane was the winner of the competition, making it her second consecutive Power of Veto win. Diane chose to use the Veto on Drew, with Karen being the only eligible HouseGuest to be nominated in his place. On Day 70, Karen became the tenth HouseGuest to be evicted from the house in a unanimous vote of two to zero. She was the fifth member of the Jury of Seven.

Following Karen's eviction, HouseGuests competed in the "Before or After" Head of Household competition. For this competition, the HouseGuests were quizzed on whether one event happened before or after another event. Ultimately, Drew won the competition, making it the third time he had won the title. On Day 71, HouseGuests competed in the "Trashin' the Fashion" luxury competition. For this competition, HouseGuests earned a shopping spree in exchange for destroying various clothing items that they disliked. That same day, Drew chose to nominate Diane and Nakomis for eviction. The HouseGuests later competed in the "Socket to Me" final Power of Veto competition. For this competition, there were a total of ten boxes, each with the image of that week's Head of Household, nominees, and Power of Veto winner. They were required to electrically link all of the Power of Veto winners to one another in order, and the HouseGuest with the quickest time would win the Power of Veto. Michael was the winner of the competition, giving him his first win of the season. On Day 75, Michael had to use the veto to save a nominee, therefore evicting the other nominee not saved and chose to use the Veto on Diane. With Drew (the HoH), Michael (the Veto winner), and Diane (Vetoed) all immune from eviction, Nakomis was evicted by a Michael's sole vote, making her the sixth member of the jury.

Following Nakomis' eviction, HouseGuests competed in the "Earthquake" first round of the final Head of Household competition. For this endurance competition, HouseGuests were required to hold onto their keys while standing on a platform that moved around. Drew was the winner of this competition. Diane and Michael later faced off in the "Twisted twosomes" Head of Household competition, which Michael won. On Day 78, Drew and Michael competed in the "Encore Presentation" Head of Household competition. Drew was the winner of the competition, making him the final Head of Household of the season. Moments later, he cast the sole vote to evict Diane. On Day 82, the Jury of Seven chose to award Drew the grand prize in a vote of four to three.

== Episodes ==
No. overall	No. in season	Title	Original release date	U.S. viewers (millions)
167	1	"Episode 1"	July 6, 2004	9.55
168	2	"Episode 2"	July 8, 2004	9.17
169	3	"Episode 3"	July 13, 2004	8.63
170	4	"Episode 4"	July 15, 2004	8.76
171	5	"Episode 5"	July 17, 2004	4.87
172	6	"Episode 6"	July 20, 2004	9.15
173	7	"Episode 7"	July 22, 2004	8.61
174	8	"Episode 8"	July 24, 2004	4.94
175	9	"Episode 9"	July 27, 2004	8.77
176	10	"Episode 10"	July 29, 2004	8.64
177	11	"Episode 11"	July 31, 2004	6.65
178	12	"Episode 12"	August 3, 2004	8.98
179	13	"Episode 13"	August 5, 2004	9.53
180	14	"Episode 14"	August 7, 2004	6.29
181	15	"Episode 15"	August 10, 2004	9.32
182	16	"Episode 16"	August 12, 2004	9.51
183	17	"Episode 17"	August 14, 2004	5.64
184	18	"Episode 18"	August 17, 2004	7.87
185	19	"Episode 19"	August 19, 2004	8.88
186	20	"Episode 20"	August 21, 2004	6.20
187	21	"Episode 21"	August 24, 2004	9.68
188	22	"Episode 22"	August 26, 2004	8.65
189	23	"Episode 23"	August 31, 2004	8.37
190	24	"Episode 24"	September 2, 2004	8.10
191	25	"Episode 25"	September 4, 2004	7.05
192	26	"Episode 26"	September 7, 2004	9.76
193	27	"Episode 27"	September 9, 2004	8.72
194	28	"Episode 28"	September 11, 2004	6.47
195	29	"Episode 29"	September 14, 2004	9.99
196	30	"Episode 30"	September 17, 2004	8.10
197	31	"Episode 31"	September 21, 2004	10.54

== Voting history ==
Color key:

Winner
Runner-up
Head of Household
Nominated for eviction
Evicted
Won entry into game

Voting history (season 5)
	Week 1	Week 2	Week 3	Week 4	Week 5	Week 6	Week 7	Week 8	Week 9 (Note: This week was a fast forward week. The HouseGuests played a week's worth of games, including Head of Household and veto competitions, and nomination, veto and eviction ceremonies, within 48 hours.)		Week 10	Week 11	
	Week 1	Week 2	Week 3	Week 4	Week 5	Week 6	Week 7	Week 8	Day 65	Day 70	Week 10	Day 78	Finale
Head of Household	Jase	Marvin	Drew	Diane	Nakomis	Adria	Nakomis	Marvin	Drew	Nakomis	Drew	Drew	(None)
Nominations (initial)	Mike; Nakomis	Holly; Lori	Holly; Nakomis	Jase; Scott	Diane; Marvin	Marvin; Will	Adria; Natalie	Adria; Michael	Diane; Marvin	Drew; Michael	Diane; Nakomis	(None)	(None)
Veto winner	Scott	Jase	Nakomis	Jase	Drew	Adria	Adria	Karen	Diane	Diane	Michael	(None)	(None)
Nominations (final)	Mike; Nakomis	Karen; Lori	Adria; Holly	Marvin; Scott	Jase; Marvin	Marvin; Will	Michael; Natalie	Adria; Michael	Marvin; Nakomis	Karen; Michael	Nakomis	Diane; Michael	(None)
Drew	Mike	Lori	Head of Household	Marvin	Jase	Will	Natalie	Adria	Head of Household	Karen	Head of Household	Diane (Note: As Head of Household, Drew chose to evict Diane.)	Winner
Michael	Mike	Lori	Holly	Marvin	Marvin	Will	Nominated	Nominated	Marvin	Nominated	No vote	Nominated	Runner-up
Diane	Mike	Karen	Holly	Head of Household	Jase	Marvin	Natalie	Adria	Marvin	Karen	No vote	Evicted (Day 78)	Drew
Nakomis	Nominated	Lori	Holly	Scott	Head of Household	Marvin	Head of Household	Adria	Nominated	Head of Household	Nominated	Evicted (Day 75)	Michael
Karen	Mike	Nominated	Holly	Scott	Jase	Marvin	Natalie	Adria	Marvin	Nominated	Evicted (Day 70)		Drew
Marvin	Mike	Head of Household	Holly	Nominated	Nominated	Nominated	Natalie	Head of Household	Nominated	Evicted (Day 65)			Drew
Adria	Mike	Lori	Nominated	Scott	Jase	Will (Note: As the vote was tied, the Head of Household cast the tie-breaker vote.)	Michael	Nominated	Evicted (Day 63)				Michael
Natalie	Non-HouseGuest (Note: Identical twins Adria and Natalie took turns playing as a single HouseGuest during the first four weeks, secretly trading places every few days between living inside the house and being in sequester outside the house. Both twins pretended to be Adria until they completed this task. Following the fourth eviction, Natalie was allowed to enter the house on her own since Adria was still in the game.)				Jase	Will	Nominated	Evicted (Day 56)					Michael
Will	Mike	Karen	Holly	Scott	Jase	Nominated	Evicted (Day 49)						Drew
Jase	Head of Household	Lori	Adria	Marvin	Nominated	Evicted (Day 42)							
Scott	Mike	Lori	Holly	Nominated	Evicted (Day 35)								
Holly	Mike	Lori	Nominated	Evicted (Day 28)									
Lori	Mike	Nominated	Evicted (Day 21)										
Mike	Nominated	Evicted (Day 14)											
Evicted	Mike; 10 of 10 votes to evict	Lori; 7 of 9 votes to evict	Holly; 7 of 8 votes to evict	Scott; 4 of 7 votes to evict	Natalie; Won entry into game (Note: After successfully surviving four evictions, Natalie won entry into the game as an individual player.)	Will; 4 of 7 votes to evict	Natalie; 4 of 5 votes to evict	Adria; 4 of 4 votes to evict	Marvin; 3 of 3 votes to evict	Karen; 2 of 2 votes to evict	Nakomis; Michael's choice not to save (Note: Michael used the Power of Veto on Diane, and since there was no available replacement nominee, Nakomis was evicted by default.)	Diane; Drew's choice to evict	Drew; 4 votes to win
Evicted	Mike; 10 of 10 votes to evict	Lori; 7 of 9 votes to evict	Holly; 7 of 8 votes to evict	Scott; 4 of 7 votes to evict	Jase; 6 of 7 votes to evict	Will; 4 of 7 votes to evict	Natalie; 4 of 5 votes to evict	Adria; 4 of 4 votes to evict	Marvin; 3 of 3 votes to evict	Karen; 2 of 2 votes to evict	Nakomis; Michael's choice not to save	Diane; Drew's choice to evict	Michael; 3 votes to win

== Production ==
=== Development ===
Shortly after the confirmation of the fourth season, it was confirmed that producers such as Allison Grodner and Arnold Shapiro would return to the series for this season, and were also contracted to do the fifth season. Despite signing on for Big Brother 5, the series had not been confirmed at the time. In September 2003, following the ratings success of Big Brother 4, Entertainment Weekly confirmed that CBS had renewed the series leading up until 2006, ensuring three more seasons to air during the Summer time period. Casting for Big Brother 5 began on September 15, 2003, before the conclusion of the previous season. On the fifth season, producer Arnold Shapiro stated, "Allison [Grodner] and I are excited about Big Brother 5, and the new surprises and twists that await this summer's HouseGuests [...] The one constant we can promise participants and viewers alike is: expect the unexpected. We’re seeking the most outgoing, competitive, quirky and charismatic players we can find." Shortly afterwards, host Julie Chen began teasing about some changes to the format, and a video posted online also promised a "twisted" change to the game. The HouseGuests for this season, excluding Natalie, were revealed through the official CBS site for the series on June 30, 2004.

=== House ===
The house used for Big Brother 5 remained mostly unchanged from the previous edition in terms of structure. The house was a one-story building which featured numerous two way mirrors around the walls. Behind these mirrors are numerous camera men, who film the HouseGuests non-stop while they are participating in the game. Aside from these, various cameras and microphones are planted in the house, to catch what is happening at all times. The living room featured two white couches sitting across from each other, with the nominees having their own chairs as in the previous seasons. These yellow chairs were in the middle of the couch, and HouseGuests were required to sit here on eviction nights. The bathroom remained unchanged from the previous editions, featuring blue walls with a bathtub and shower. There were a total of four bedrooms this season. One of these had four stone beds in it, with host Julie Chen referring to the room as "pretty bad" in an interview before the premiere. The second had three beds, however, had no privacy. The third featured two large beds, however, required two HouseGuests to sleep in each. This room featured a sky theme, with the walls being painted blue and given the appearance of having clouds on them. The fourth bedroom is the Head of Household room. The HoH for the week has this rooms, which features perks such as privacy, laundry service, and pictures from home. This was the first season in which a spy screen was placed in the Head of Household room, which featured a video feed of various rooms in the house. The house also featured a swimming pool and a hot tub, with HouseGuests competing for the hot tub in the first week. This season saw the removal of the basketball court from the backyard, and the fish tank in the house now features miniature sharks rather than fish.

=== Prizes ===
The 14 HouseGuests this season were competing for the main prize of $500,000. The winner of the series, determined by the previously evicted HouseGuests, would win the $500,000 prize, while the Runner-Up would receive a $50,000 prize. Other than the main prize, various luxuries and prizes were given out throughout the season.

== Broadcast ==
Big Brother 5 was broadcast on CBS from July 6, 2004, to September 21, 2004. This season featured a change in the airing format, with episodes airing on Tuesday, Thursday, and Saturday each week. This was a change from the previous season, which aired on Wednesday and Friday instead of Thursday and Saturday. The Thursday episode, which aired at 8 pm Eastern Time, featured the live eviction and subsequent Head of Household competition taking place. During the live eviction, the show was hosted by Julie Chen. The Saturday episode, which aired at 9 pm Eastern Time, featured the food competition and nomination ceremony, as well as some highlights from the previous days. The Tuesday episode featured the Power of Veto competition and the Power of Veto ceremony, along with more highlights of recent events in the game. Some changes to the scheduling format were made. The season premiere lasted for a total of ninety minutes, and aired on Tuesday at 8 pm Eastern Time due to conflicts with the premiere of The Amazing Race 5.

This season saw the return of the fantasy game first introduced in the previous season. In the game, players would make a team of HouseGuests and earn points when a member of their team did certain things in the game. The website for the series also featured a "Love 'Em or Leave 'Em" poll, in which fans could monitor the popularity of the HouseGuests each week. Much like the previous editions, the live feeds were also available again for this season. HouseGuests enter the house a few days before the premiere, and the feeds are not live for the first few days. They later go live after the broadcast of the launch episode. This season also saw the introduction of the first spin-off series, House Calls: The Big Brother Talk Show. The online webshow, hosted by Gretchen Massey and Big Brother 3 HouseGuest Marcellas Reynolds aired thirty-minute episodes on weeknights, and allowed fans to call in and express their opinions on the events of the game. Evicted HouseGuests were also interviewed on the series following their eviction. This made House Calls the first live Internet talk show produced exclusively for a television network.

== Reception ==
=== Ratings ===
Big Brother 5 had similar ratings to that of the previous season, and averaged a total of 8.30 million viewers per episode. The season premiere drew in 9.55 million viewers, finishing first in its time slot for both total viewers and in key demographics such as Adults 18–49, Adults 18-34 and Adults 25–54. The Thursday, July 15 episode of the series, which saw Mike being evicted from the house, had a total of 8.76 million viewers, up 12% from the previous episode. This episode won its time period for both total viewers and all key demographics. The Tuesday, August 3 edition of the series, which featured Jase winning the Power of Veto, had a total of 9.7 million viewers. The episode averaged a total of 8.98 million viewers, and won all the time period for the night. The Thursday, August 12 episode, which featured Jase's eviction from the house, garnered a total of ten million viewers. The Tuesday, August 17 episode of the series came in third for the night, behind the Olympics, garnering a total of 8.2 million viewers. The Tuesday, August 24 episode of the series averaged 9.6 million viewers. The Tuesday, September 7 edition of the series averaged 10.7 million viewers. The same episode had a strong 6.8 Nielsen rating and an 11 share. The Thursday, September 9 episode had a 6.2 rating and a 10 share. The finale had a total of 10.54 million viewers, making it the highest rated episode of the season.
