= Carl Barbier =

American judge (born 1944)

Carl Joseph Barbier
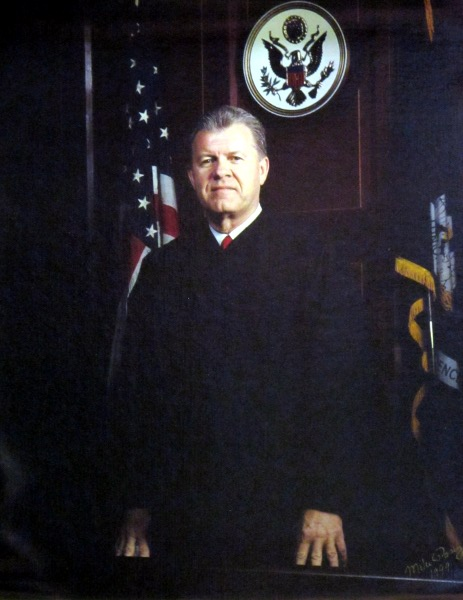

Senior Judge of the United States District Court for the Eastern District of Louisiana
- Incumbent
- Assumed office January 1, 2023

Judge of the United States District Court for the Eastern District of Louisiana
- In office October 1, 1998 – January 1, 2023
- Appointed by: Bill Clinton
- Preceded by: Okla Jones II
- Succeeded by: Darrel J. Papillion

Personal details
- Born: Carl Joseph Barbier; August 21, 1944 (age 81) New Orleans, Louisiana, U.S.
- Education: Southeastern Louisiana University (BA); Loyola University New Orleans (JD)

Carl Joseph Barbier (born August 21, 1944) is a senior United States district judge of the United States District Court for the Eastern District of Louisiana.

== Education and career ==
Born in 1944 in New Orleans, Louisiana, Barbier attended West Jefferson High School before receiving a Bachelor of Arts degree from Southeastern Louisiana University in 1966 and a Juris Doctor from Loyola University New Orleans School of Law in 1970. He was a law clerk to Judge William Redman, Louisiana Court of Appeal, Fourth Circuit from 1969 to 1970, and to Judge Fred James Cassibry of the United States District Court for the Eastern District of Louisiana from 1970 to 1971. Barbier was in private practice in New Orleans from 1971 to 1998.

== Federal judicial service ==
On May 19, 1998, Barbier was nominated by President Bill Clinton to a seat on the United States District Court for the Eastern District of Louisiana vacated by Okla Jones II. Barbier was confirmed by the United States Senate on September 28, 1998, and received his commission on October 1, 1998. Barbier assumed senior status on January 1, 2023.

== Notable cases ==
In August 2010, he was appointed to hear the cases in the Deepwater Horizon oil spill. At least 300 cases were consolidated in his court.

On November 14, 2011, Barbier ruled that BP, the company that leased the Deepwater Horizon oil rig, must face federal maritime lawsuits by Alabama and Louisiana. On September 4, 2014, he further found BP to be grossly negligent in the spill, attributing 67% of the blame to the company. As a result, the company may be liable for as much as $18 billion in fines under the Clean Water Act.

Legal offices
Preceded by Okla Jones II	Judge of the United States District Court for the Eastern District of Louisiana; 1998–2023	Succeeded by Darrel J. Papillion
