= Gordon S. Holder =

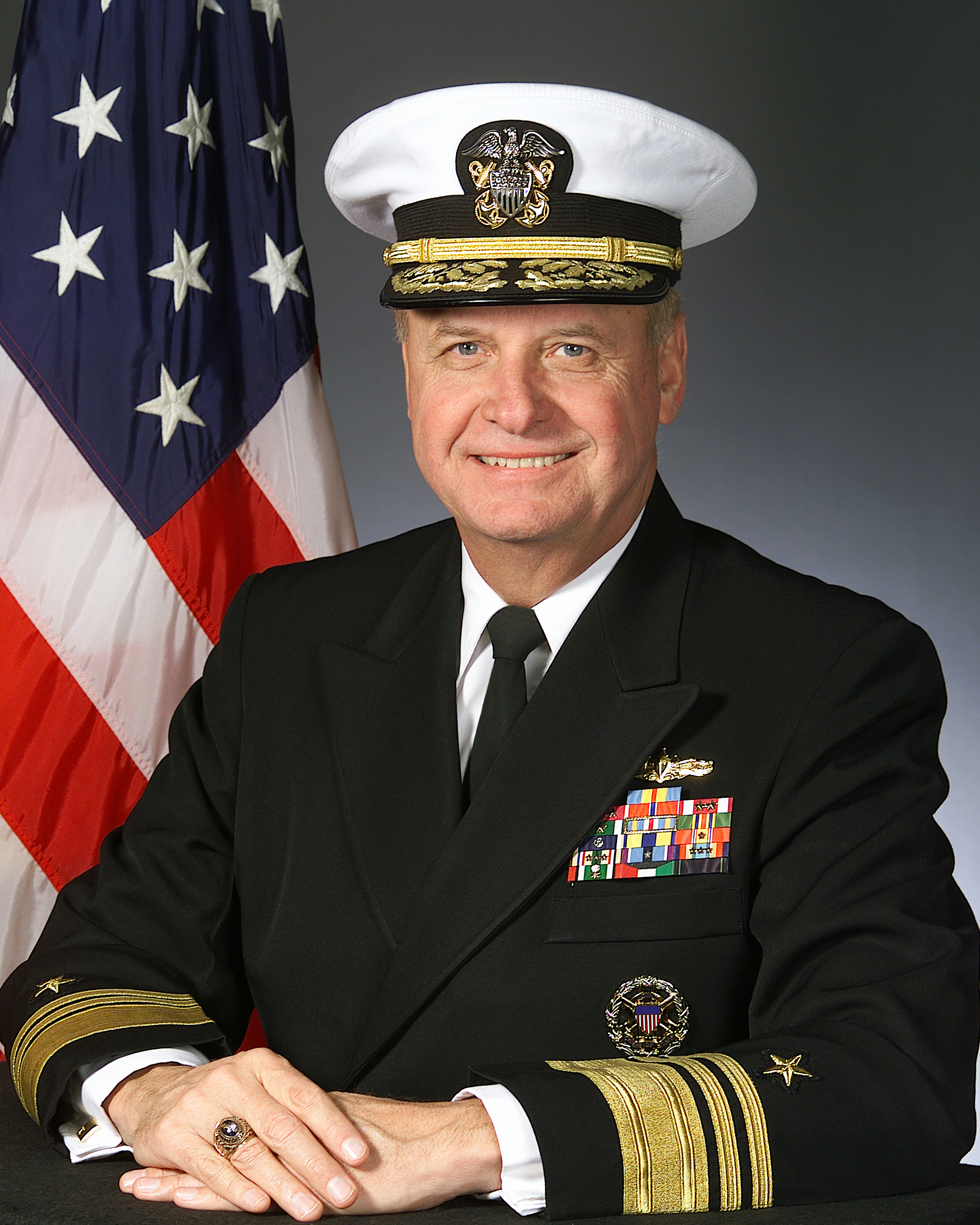
- Vice Admiral Gordon Holder
- Born: Gordon Stallings Holder; 21 July 1946 (age 80)
- Military career
- Allegiance: United States of America
- Branch: United States Navy
- Service years: 1968–2004
- Rank: Vice admiral
- Commands: Military Sealift Command
- Conflicts: Operation Iraqi Freedom; Desert Shield; Desert Storm
- Awards: Defense Distinguished Service Medal; Legion of Merit; Bronze Star Medal; Meritorious Service Medal; Navy Commendation Medal

Gordon S. Holder was a vice admiral in the United States Navy. He was a senior vice president at Booz Allen Hamilton.

Prior to his retirement from the navy, Holder served as commander of the Military Sealift Command. He also served as commander of the Naval Doctrine Command.

Holder started his navy career by graduating from Navy Officer Candidate School in Newport, RI in October 1968. He served in the U.S. Navy from 1968 thru 2004. He was in charge of strategic logistics and warfighting efforts for Booz Allen Hamilton.

== Education ==
- Bachelor's degree in music education from Florida State University.
- Master's degree in personnel counseling from Troy University.
