= Okla Jones II =

American judge (1945–1996)

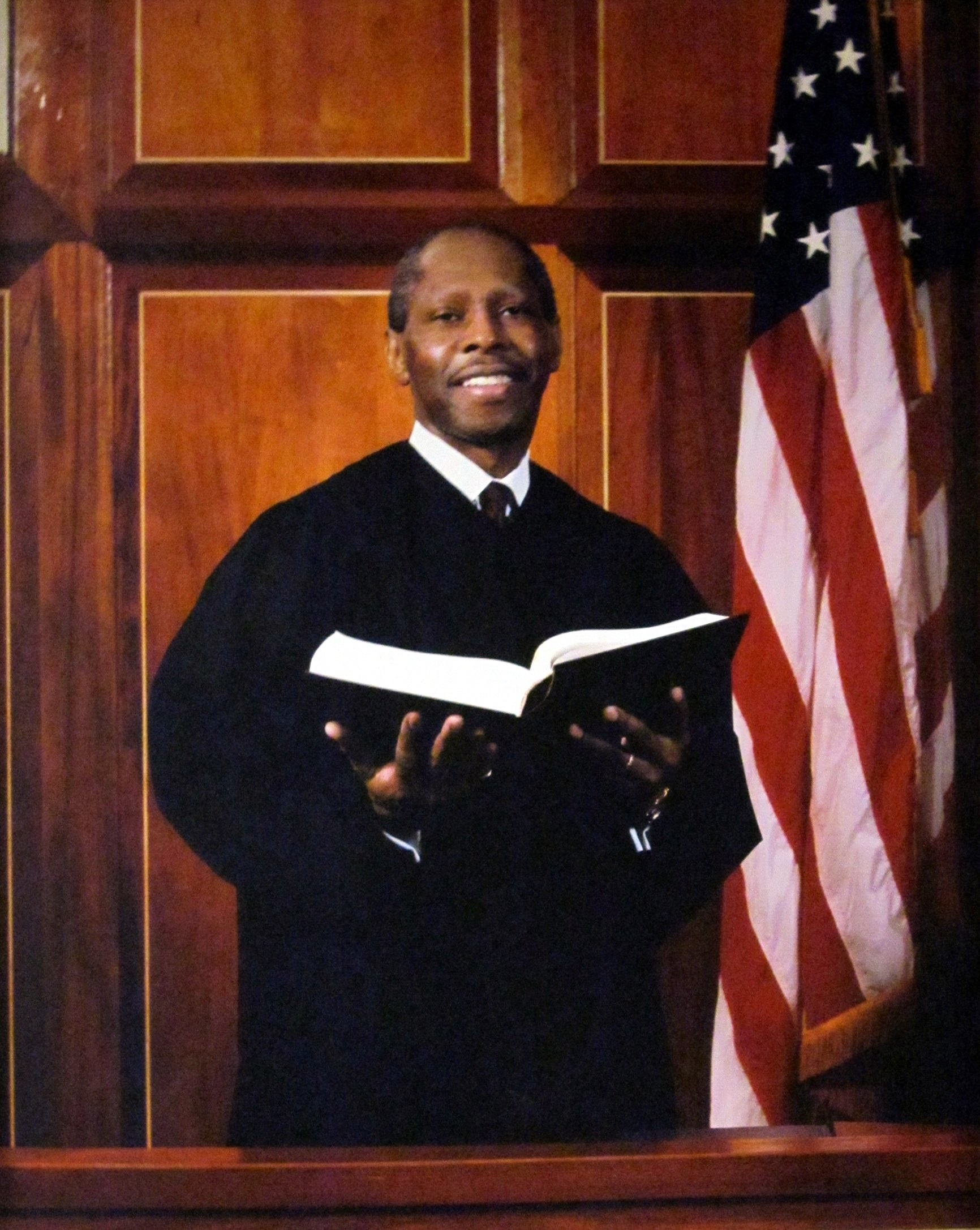

Judge of the United States District Court for the Eastern District of Louisiana
- In office October 11, 1994 – January 8, 1996
- Appointed by: Bill Clinton
- Preceded by: Frederick Jacob Reagan Heebe
- Succeeded by: Carl Barbier

Judge of the Civil District Court for the Parish of Orleans (Division N)
- In office January 1, 1991 – October 11, 1994

City Attorney of New Orleans
- In office May 1986 – December 1990
- Mayor: Sidney Barthelemy

Personal details
- Born: Okla Jones II; September 23, 1945 Natchitoches, Louisiana, U.S.
- Died: January 8, 1996 (aged 50) New Orleans, Louisiana, U.S.
- Spouse: Carolyn A. Carmon
- Children: Okla Jones, III
- Education: Southern University (BA); Boston College (JD)

Okla Jarred Jones II (September 23, 1945 – January 8, 1996) was a United States district judge of the United States District Court for the Eastern District of Louisiana.

== Education and career ==
Born in Natchitoches, Louisiana, Jones received a Bachelor of Arts degree from Southern University in 1968 and a Juris Doctor from Boston College Law School in 1971. Jones was a Reginald Heber Smith Fellow staff attorney of New Orleans Legal Assistance Corporation from 1971 to 1973. He was a staff attorney of American Civil Liberties Union in 1973. He was a project director, New Orleans Office of the Lawyer's Committee for Civil Rights Under Law from 1973 to 1976. He was in private practice in New Orleans, Louisiana from 1976 to 1986. He was a special counsel, New Orleans City Council, Louisiana from 1983 to 1986. Jones was a City attorney of City of New Orleans, Louisiana from 1986 to 1990. He was a Civil district court judge, Parish of New Orleans, Div. 'N', Louisiana from 1990 to 1994.

== Federal judicial service ==
On August 25, 1994, Jones was nominated by President Bill Clinton to a seat on the United States District Court for the Eastern District of Louisiana vacated by Judge Frederick Jacob Reagan Heebe. Jones was confirmed by the United States Senate on October 7, 1994, and received his commission on October 11, 1994. Jones served in that capacity until his death in 1996 from leukemia in New Orleans.

== See also ==
- List of African-American federal judges
- List of African-American jurists

== Sources ==
- Confirmation hearings on federal appointments : hearings before the Committee on the Judiciary, United States Senate, One Hundred Third Congress, first session on confirmations of appointees to the federal judiciary 4.J 89/2:S.HRG.103-1031/ pt.6 (1994)

Legal offices
Preceded by Frederick Jacob Reagan Heebe	Judge of the United States District Court for the Eastern District of Louisiana; 1994–1996	Succeeded by Carl Barbier
