= Kathie Stromile Golden =

American political scientist

- Education: Southern University; University of Kentucky
- Scientific career
- Fields: Political science
- Workplaces: University of Colorado; Morris Brown College; Clark Atlanta University; Texas Tech University; Arkansas State University; University of Kentucky; Mississippi Valley State University

Kathie Stromile Golden is an American political scientist. She is the Provost and Senior Vice President for Academic Affairs at Mississippi Valley State University, where she is also a Professor of Rural Public Policy. She specializes in the politics of communist and post-communist societies.

== Early work and education ==
Golden attended Southern University, graduating with a BA in 1974. She continued to study at Southern University, earning an MA in social science in 1975. She then obtained a PhD from the University of Kentucky in 1987.

Upon graduating with her PhD, Golden worked as a postdoctoral researcher at the University of Illinois for 2 years, before joining the faculty at the University of Colorado. In 1996, she became a professor as well as the director of Faculty and Staff Research at Morris Brown College. After several years as an administrator and program director at organizations like UNCF, she joined the faculty at Mississippi Valley State University in 2006. She has also taught at Clark Atlanta University, Texas Tech University, Arkansas State University, and the University of Kentucky.

== Career ==
While at Morris Brown College in the late 1990s, Golden was credited with developing and encouraging participation in faculty development programs.

In August 2019, Golden was named the Provost and Senior Vice President for Academic Affairs at Mississippi Valley State University, as the result of a nationwide search. At that time, she already served as both the executive director of the National Conference of Black Political Scientists and director of the National Conference of Black Political Scientists Graduate Assistant Program. She had also previously been the director of international programs at Mississippi Valley State University, and also the associate vice president for academic affairs there.

Golden has also served as the Executive Director of the National Conference of Black Political Scientists. The Lena Harris Stromile Student Leadership Award, named after Golden's mother, is given to a student in recognition of their community involvement and "honors the contributions of the Stromile family to NCOBPS and their life-long involvement in developing student leaders".
