= Frank Burton Ellis =

American judge (1907–1969)

Frank Ellis
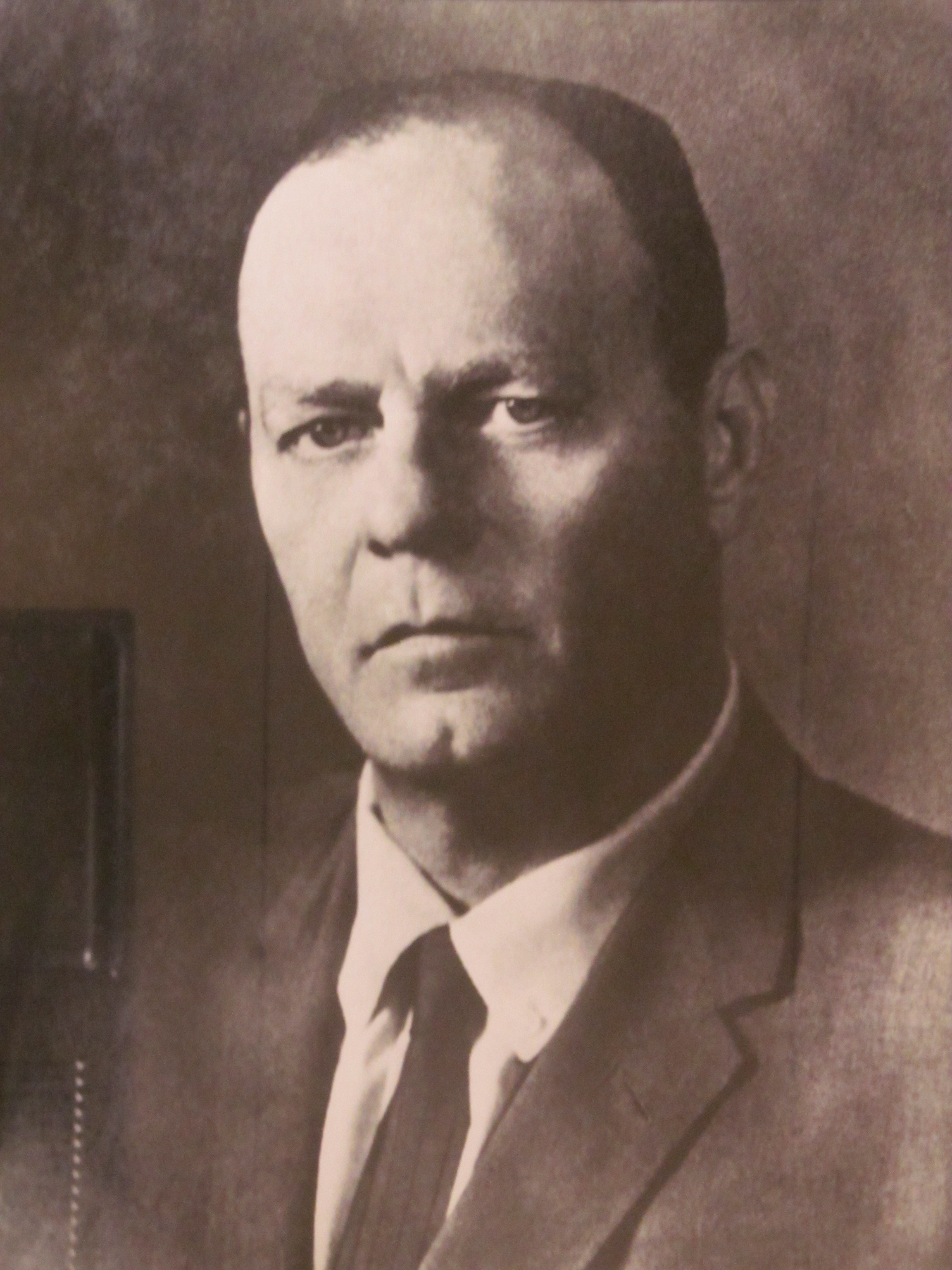

Senior Judge of the United States District Court for the Eastern District of Louisiana
- In office November 16, 1965 – November 3, 1969

Judge of the United States District Court for the Eastern District of Louisiana
- In office April 12, 1962 – November 16, 1965
- Appointed by: John F. Kennedy
- Preceded by: J. Skelly Wright
- Succeeded by: Frederick Heebe

Director of the Office of Emergency Planning
- In office September 22, 1961 – February 2, 1962
- President: John F. Kennedy
- Preceded by: Position established
- Succeeded by: Edward McDermott

Director of the Office of Civil and Defense Mobilization
- In office March 9, 1961 – September 22, 1961
- President: John F. Kennedy
- Preceded by: Lewis Berry (acting)
- Succeeded by: Position abolished

President pro tempore of the Louisiana Senate
- In office 1940–1944
- Preceded by: Coleman Lindsey
- Succeeded by: Grove Stafford

Member of the Louisiana Senate from the St. Tammany Parish district
- In office 1940–1944
- Preceded by: Esco Knight
- Succeeded by: H. H. Richardson

Personal details
- Born: Frank Burton Ellis; February 10, 1907 Covington, Louisiana, U.S.
- Died: November 5, 1969 (aged 62) Tangipahoa Parish, Louisiana, U.S.
- Party: Democratic
- Spouse(s): Alice Grima (divorced) Marjorie Wheatley (m. 1965–1969)
- Children: 3
- Education: Gulf Coast Military Academy (BS); Louisiana State University, Baton Rouge (LLB)

Frank Burton Ellis (February 10, 1907 – November 3, 1969) was a United States district judge of the United States District Court for the Eastern District of Louisiana.

== Education and career ==
Born in Covington, Louisiana, Ellis attended the Gulf Coast Military Academy and received a Bachelor of Laws from the Paul M. Hebert Law Center at Louisiana State University in 1929. He was in private practice of law in New Orleans, Louisiana from 1930 to 1961. He served as a special assistant attorney general of Louisiana. He was a Member of the Louisiana State Senate from 1940 to 1944, serving as President pro tem from 1940 to 1944. He was National Director of the Office of Emergency Planning from 1961 to 1962. He was a Member of the National Security Council in 1961.

== Federal judicial service ==
Ellis was nominated by President John F. Kennedy on February 2, 1962, to a seat on the United States District Court for the Eastern District of Louisiana vacated by J. Skelly Wright. He was confirmed by the United States Senate on April 3, 1962, and received his commission on April 12, 1962. He assumed senior status due to a certified disability on November 16, 1965. His service was terminated on November 3, 1969, due to his death.

== Sources ==
- FJC Bio
- "The Federal Leaders". atomictheater.com.
- "The Eisenhower Ten". conelrad.com.
- "Judge Frank Burton Ellis: A Brief Biography and Selected Genealogy". tulanelink.com.
- "Members of the Louisiana State Senate, 1880-2012" (PDF). legis.state.la.us. Archived from the original (PDF) on February 24, 2012.
- Minden Herald, January 14, 1944, p. 5
- "Frank Burton Ellis: The Bureaucrat". tulanelink.com.
- Minden Herald, Minden, Louisiana, June 18, 1954, p. 2.
- Minden Herald, July 16, 1954, p. 3.
- Numan V. Bartley and Hugh D. Graham, Southern Elections: County and Precinct Data, 1950-1972, Baton Rouge: Louisiana State University Press, 1978, p. 122.
- Quoted in Clarence L. Mohr and Joseph E. Gordon, Tulane: The Emergence of a Modern University, 1945-1980, Baton Rouge: Louisiana State University Press, 2001, p. 227.

Louisiana State Senate
Preceded by Coleman Lindsey	President pro tempore of the Louisiana Senate; 1940–1944	Succeeded by Grove Stafford
Political offices
Preceded by Lewis Berry; Acting	Director of the Office of Civil and Defense Mobilization; 1961	Position abolished
New office	Director of the Office of Emergency Planning; 1961–1962	Succeeded by Edward McDermott
Legal offices
Preceded by J. Skelly Wright	Judge of the United States District Court for the Eastern District of Louisiana; 1962–1965	Succeeded by Frederick Heebe
