= Tom Foreman =

American broadcast journalist for CNN

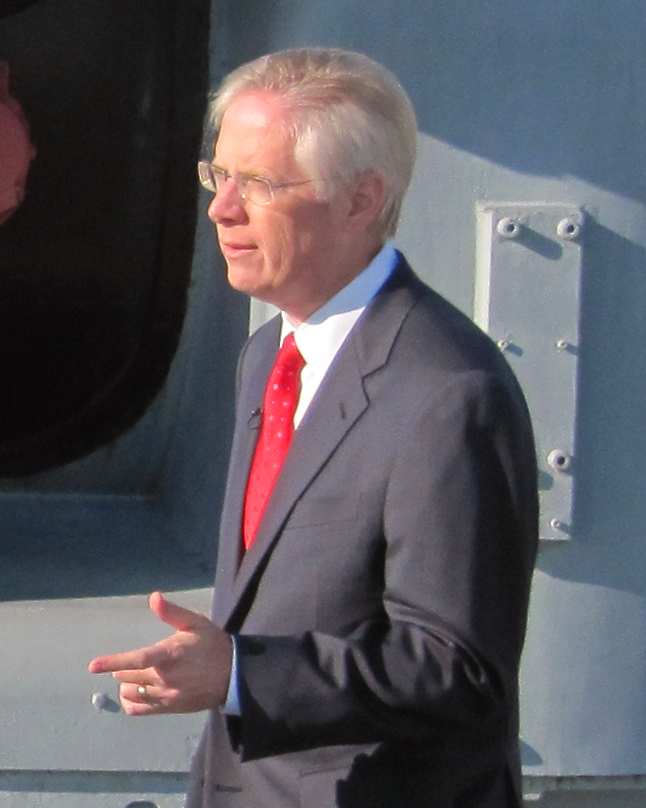
- Foreman in 2011
- Born: Thomas James Foreman; December 6, 1959 (age 66)
- Education: Troy University (BA)
- Occupation: Journalist
- Years active: 1979–present
- Spouse(s): Linda Foreman (1986-present; 2 children)
- Website: at CNN

Tom Foreman (born December 6, 1959) is an American broadcast journalist for CNN whose reporting experience spans more than three decades. Beginning as a local television reporter in Montgomery, Alabama, at WSFA, he continued on to work for WWL-TV, the CBS affiliate in New Orleans, Louisiana. In 1990, Foreman relocated to Denver, Colorado, as a national network correspondent for ABC World News Tonight with Peter Jennings and Nightline. In 2000, Foreman signed with National Geographic and anchored National Geographic Today, a daily news story focusing on major scientific and breaking nature news, and Inside Base Camp, for which he won an Emmy award as best interviewer. He joined CNN in 2004, and currently works out of CNN's Washington DC Bureau covering a wide range topics from breaking political news to international crises. His career has taken him to all 50 states and through more than 20 countries for coverage of earthquakes, civil wars, economic upheavals and social unrest.

== Education ==
Foreman graduated magna cum laude from Troy University in 1981 with a degree in Broadcast Journalism and another in Theater Performance.

== Awards ==
In 2005, Foreman won a National Headliner Award for a feature about an American soldier who brought the Christmas spirit to a Luxembourg town during World War II.

He is the inaugural winner of the Cronkite/Jackson Prize for Fact Checking Political Messages.

== Work ==
On Saturday, January 19, 2013, Foreman admitted to writing a letter to President Obama every day over the previous four years—1,460 letters, totaling more than a half-million words.

On February 4, 2014, Foreman was the moderator of the debate between Bill Nye and Ken Ham on the question "Is Creation A Viable Model of Origins?" at the Creation Museum.

Foreman's book, My Year of Running Dangerously, was published in 2015. It tells his story of running marathons and an ultramarathon, and training with his daughter.
