= Hardy =

Hardy may refer to:

== People ==
- Hardy (surname)
- Hardy (given name)
- Hardy (singer), American singer-songwriter
- Mary Ann Lyth, British missionary, translator, and teacher

== Places ==
=== Antarctica ===
- Mount Hardy, Enderby Land
- Hardy Cove, Greenwich Island
- Hardy Rocks, Biscoe Islands

=== Australia ===
- Hardy, South Australia, a locality
- Cape Hardy, a headland in South Australia
- Hardy Inlet, Western Australia

=== Canada ===
- Hardy Township, Ontario, Canada, administered by the Loring, Port Loring and District, Ontario, services board
- Port Hardy, British Columbia
- Hardy, Saskatchewan, Canada, a hamlet

=== United States ===
- Hardy, Arkansas, a city
- Hardy, California, an unincorporated community
- Hardy, Iowa, a city
- Hardy, Kentucky, an unincorporated community
- Hardy, Mississippi, an unincorporated community
- Hardy, Montana, an unincorporated community
- Hardy, Nebraska, a village
- Hardy, Oscoda County, Michigan, a ghost town
- Hardy, Virginia, an unincorporated community
- Hardy County, West Virginia
- Hardy Dam, Michigan
- Hardy Lake, Indiana, a state reservoir
- Hardy Pond, Massachusetts
- Hardy Toll Road, Texas
- Hardy Township, Holmes County, Ohio

=== Elsewhere ===
- Hardy Peninsula, Chile
- Hardy River, Mexico
- Hardy Town, Gibraltar, a temporary civilian settlement during a Napoleonic Wars siege
- Hardy Way, a long-distance footpath in southern England
- Hardy Point, Bellingshausen Island in the South Sandwich Islands
- 2866 Hardy, an asteroid

== Ships ==
- Hardy class destroyer, a Royal Navy class of two ships in commission from 1895 to 1912
- HMS Hardy, various Royal Navy ships

== Businesses ==
- Hardy Oil and Gas, a British company
- The Hardy Wine Company, an Australian wine company

== Other uses ==
- The Hardy Boys, a detective series about two teenage brothers and amateur detectives
- The Hardy Boyz, a professional wrestling tag team consisting of real-life brothers Matt and Jeff Hardy
- Hardy baronets, two titles in the Baronetage of the United Kingdom, both extinct
- Hardy Fishing Rods, a brand of fishing rods owned by Pure Fishing
- Hardy (hill), a category of hill in the United Kingdom
- Hardy Monument, Dorset, United Kingdom
- Hardy Memorial Tower, San Diego State University, San Diego, California, United States
- Hardy Cup (ice hockey), a Canadian ice hockey trophy
- Hardy Trophy, a Canadian football trophy
- Hardy tool, a type of accessory tool used with an anvil
- Hardy (locomotive), a locomotive at the Dinorwic quarry

== See also ==
- Hardiness (disambiguation)
- Hardee (disambiguation)
- Hardys (disambiguation)
