= Limeback =

Limeback may refer to:

- Eric Limeback (born 1992), Canadien speedcuber
- Hardy Limeback, Canadian professor of dentistery
