= Hardy (given name) =

Hardy is the given name of:

- Hardy (singer) (born 1990), American country-, country rock-, and hard rock singer and songwriter
- Hardy Ames Hill, American bouncer; contestant on Big Brother 2 (American season)
- Hardy Amies (1909–2003), English fashion designer, businessman, and World War II personnel
- Hardy Åström (born 1951), Swedish retired NHL player
- Hardy Billington (born 1952/1953), American politician
- Hardy Binguila (born 1996), Congolese professional footballer
- Hardy Brian (1865–1949), American newspaper publisher and politician
- Hardy Brown (1924–1991), American NFL-, AAFC-, and AFL player
- Hardy Browning (1915–1999), New Zealand miner-turned-potter
- Hardy Campbell Jr. (c. 1863–1898), American horse trainer and owner
- Hardy Caprio (born 1996), Sierra Leonean-born English rapper and singer
- Hardy Cavero (born 1996), Chilean footballer
- Hardy Cross (1885–1959), American structural engineer
- Hardy Cross Dillard (1902–1982), American jurist, judge, and army colonel during World War II
- Hardy Cubasch (born 1980), Australian former champion rower
- Hardy Dhir, Canadian candidate in the 2003 Toronto municipal election
- Hardy Drew and the Nancy Boys, Irish band
- Hardy Falconer Parsons (1897–1917), English World War I officer
- Hardy Fox (1945–2018), American musician
- Hardy Haberman (born 1950), American author, filmmaker, educator, designer, and figure in the leather/fetish/BDSM community
- Hardy Häman Aktell (born 1998), Swedish NHL- and NL player
- Hardy Hanappi (born 1951), Austrian political economist
- Hardy Ivy (1779–1842), American alleged first person of European descent to permanently settle in Atlanta, Georgia
- Hardy Jones (1943–2018), American wildlife- and conservation documentary filmmaker
- Hardy Juchli, American Army soldier and medical doctor during the Nuremberg trials
- Hardy Knittel (born 1958), Chilean politician
- Hardy Krüger (1928–2022), German actor and author
- Hardy Krüger Jr. (born 1968), German actor
- Hardy Künzli, Swiss former slalom canoeist
- Hardy L. Shirley (?–1996), American forester, author, and dean
- Hardy Limeback, Canadian emeritus professor of dentistry
- Hardy Lucas, Seychelles former politician
- Hardy McLain (born 1952), American retired hedge fund manager
- Hardy Meza (born 2000), Mexican professional footballer
- Hardy Momberg (1926–1990), Chilean agricultural technician, businessman, and politician
- Hardy Murfree (1752–1809), American lieutenant colonel during the American Revolutionary War
- Hardy Myers (1939–2016), American lawyer and politician
- Hardy N. Ganong (1890–1963), Canadian sportsman and major general during both World Wars
- Hardy Nickerson (born 1965), American former NFL player and coach
- Hardy Nickerson Jr. (born 1994), American former NFL- and AFC player
- Hardy Nilsson (born 1947), Swedish retired DEL player and coach
- Hardy Nongbri (born 1997), Indian professional footballer
- Hardy Pace (1785–1864), American ferryman, miller, and early settler of Atlanta, Georgia
- Hardy Paredes (born 1983), Chilean former professional boxer
- Hardy Powers (1900–1972), American minister and general superintendent in the Church of the Nazarene
- Hardy R. Franklin (1929–2004), American librarian
- Hardy Rafn (1930–1997), Danish film actor
- Hardy Rawls (born 1952), American television actor
- Hardy Richardson (1855–1931), American MLB player
- Hardy Rodenstock (1941–2018), German publisher and manager of pop- and Schlager music, and wine collector-, connoisseur-, and trader
- Hardy Sauter (born 1971), American-born Canadian former professional ice hockey player and coach
- Hardy Strickland (1818–1884), American Confederate Army soldier and politician
- Hardy Summers (1933–2012), American Supreme Court justice and judge
- Hardy Ward (c. 1950–2018), American world champion archer
- Hardy Williams (1931–2010), American politician
- Hardy Wright (1893–1974), Scottish greyhound trainer

== Fictional characters ==
- Hardy Har Har, in the US animated TV series Lippy the Lion and Hardy Har Har, voiced by Mel Blanc
- Hardy Jenns, in the 1987 US teen romantic drama film Some Kind of Wonderful, played by Craig Sheffer
- Hardy Woodrup, in the 2023 US Christmas comedy drama film The Holdovers, played by Andrew Garman
