= Big Brother 1 (American season) =

Big Brother
- Season 1
- Big Brother 1 logo
- Hosted by: Julie Chen; Ian O'Malley
- No. of days: 88
- No. of houseguests: 10
- Winner: Eddie McGee
- Runners-up: Josh Souza; Curtis Kin
- No. of episodes: 70

Release
- Original network: CBS
- Original release: July 5 – September 29, 2000

Additional information
- Filming dates: July 4 – September 29, 2000

Season chronology
- Next → Season 2

Big Brother 2000 (retroactively known as Big Brother 1 following season 7) is the debut season of the American reality television series Big Brother. It was based upon the Netherlands series of the same name, which gained notoriety in 1999 and 2000. The series premiered on July 5, 2000. The season concluded after 88 days with Eddie McGee being crowned the winner, and Josh Souza the runner-up.

The premise of the series drastically differed from future installments of the series. The series revolved around ten strangers living in a house together with no communication with the outside world. They were constantly filmed during their time in the house, and were not permitted to communicate with those filming them. Every other week, each contestant, referred to as "Houseguests", chose two people who they wished to leave the house. The two or more people with the most votes were “marked for banishment.” The viewers then decided which of the nominees should leave with the selected person leaving during a live show. This process continued until only three HouseGuests remained, at which time the viewers would decide which of them would win the $500,000 grand prize. This format contrasts the future editions of the show, in which the HouseGuests themselves would vote each other out each week, with the ultimate winner being decided by eliminated HouseGuests.

== Format ==
Big Brother is a game show in which a group of contestants, referred to as HouseGuests, lived in a custom built "house", constantly under video surveillance. While in the house, the contestants were completely isolated from the outside world, meaning no phone, television, internet, magazines, newspaper, or contact with those not in the house. This rule could be broken, however, in the event of a family emergency or death. During their time in the house, the HouseGuests were required to nominate two of their fellow contestants for potential banishment, and the two with the most votes would be nominated. Should multiple HouseGuests receive the most nominations, then all of the HouseGuests were marked for banishment. This process was mandatory for all HouseGuests, and failure to comply could result in expulsion from the house. The public, through a vote conducted by phone, would vote to banish one of the nominated HouseGuests from the house, and the HouseGuest with the most votes from the viewers would be banished from the house. When only three HouseGuests remained, the viewers would vote for which of them should win the series, and the HouseGuest with the most votes would become the winner. The HouseGuests were competing for a $500,000 cash prize, though the runner-up of the series would receive $100,000 and the second runner-up would receive $50,000.

During their time in the house, HouseGuests were given weekly tasks to perform. The HouseGuests would wager a portion of their weekly shopping budget on the task, and would either win double their wagered fund or lose the wagered fund depending on their performance in the task. The HouseGuests were required to work as a group to complete the task, with the format of the tasks varying based on the amount of remaining HouseGuests. Should the HouseGuests run out of the food provided for them, an emergency ration was available to them. HouseGuests were also required to make visits to the Red Room during their stay in the house, where they were able to share their thoughts and feelings on their fellow HouseGuests and the game. The format of the series was mainly seen as a social experiment, and required HouseGuests to interact with others who may have differing ideals, beliefs, and prejudices. While a competition, the series allows viewers to witness the relationships formed in the house and the behavior of the HouseGuests. Nina Tassler, president of entertainment at CBS, stated "You're talking about people from very disparate walks of life and confining them in a house for a finite period of time [...] you have to recognize yes, this is that show. It is a social experiment." Though locked in the house, the HouseGuests were free to quit the game, though would not be allowed entry back into the house. Should a HouseGuest break the rules of the game, they could be expelled from the house, and unable to return.

== HouseGuests ==
The first season of Big Brother featured ten HouseGuests, each of whom were complete strangers.

Name	Age	Occupation	Residence	Result
Eddie McGee	21	Entertainer	Commack, New York	Winner; Day 88
Josh Souza	23	Civil engineering student	San Jose, California	Runner-up; Day 88
Curtis Kin	28	Lawyer	New York, New York	Third place Day 88
Jamie Kern	22	Model	Seattle, Washington	Banished; Day 86
George Boswell	41	Roofer	Rockford, Illinois	Banished; Day 79
Cassandra Waldon	37	UN Communications Director	Havre de Grace, Maryland	Banished; Day 72
Brittany Petros	25	Actress	Robbinsdale, Minnesota	Banished; Day 58
Karen Fowler	43	Mother	Columbus, Indiana	Banished; Day 44
Jean Jordan	26	Exotic dancer	Roanoke, Virginia	Banished; Day 30
William Collins	27	Politician	Philadelphia, Pennsylvania	Banished; Day 17

=== Future appearances ===
George Boswell returned for Big Brother: All-Stars and later on Big Brother 10 to host a food competition along with other Big Brother HouseGuests (alumni).

== Summary ==
On Day 1, Brittany, Cassandra, Curtis, Eddie, Karen, George, Jamie, Jordan, Josh, and William entered the house. On Day 2, they were given their first task to complete. They were required to solve a word puzzle, which would inform them of the location to find money for groceries. They were successful and earned $100 as a group. On Day 3, HouseGuests were given the task of building a clock out of potatoes in the house. Should they fail this task, they would not know the time in the house; they passed the task. On Day 4, HouseGuests were given the task of making plaster masks of themselves. On Day 5, one of the chickens in the backyard was injured. It was removed from the house and brought back later to be nursed back to health. On Day 7, HouseGuests were given their first weekly task. They were given the names of dozens of celebrities and had to state whether they were dead or alive. They were given days to attempt to recall the correct answers and would be quizzed about it at a later date. They wagered 20% of their weekly budget on this task, which they ultimately failed. William intentionally failed his portion of the challenge, upsetting many HouseGuests. On Day 9, the HouseGuests participated in their first round of nominations. William and Jordan were announced as the nominees this week, with William receiving six nominations and Jordan receiving five. Josh, Jamie, George, and Cassandra all received no nominations this week. HouseGuests were later given their new task, which required them to ride a stationary exercise bike to achieve a total distance of 1,000 miles. They wagered 50% of their weekly budget on this task, which they passed. HouseGuests were later given another task, in which they were required to imitate another HouseGuest in the Red Room. On Day 17, William became the first HouseGuest to be banished from the house when he received 73% of the public vote.

On Day 20, HouseGuests are given their new weekly challenge, in which they had days to practice making a set of dominoes fall down in a single session. They had to set up 12,100 dominoes to form the series logo and then make them all fall by knocking only one domino over. The group passed this task, which they wagered 20% on. The HouseGuests later held a fake trial dealing with the issue of flag burning, with Karen as the judge, Jordan being on trial, Brittany being a witness, Curtis and Cassandra as lawyers, and the other HouseGuests as members of the jury. On Day 22, HouseGuests participated in the second round of nominations. Curtis and Jordan became the second set of nominated HouseGuests this season, with Curtis receiving six nominations and Jordan receiving five nominations. Josh, Jamie, Cassandra, and Brittany received no nominations this week, making it the second time in a row that Josh, Jamie, and Cassandra had received no nominations from their fellow HouseGuests. HouseGuests were later given their new weekly task, which required them to ride a stationary bike for a total of one thousand miles. They wagered 50% of their shopping budget on the task, which they passed. The HouseGuests were later given another task, which required them to split into three teams and attempt to toss water balloons to their teammates from across the pool. The team of Eddie, Cassandra, and George won, though there was no reward. On Day 28, the HouseGuests held a roast for Curtis and Jordan as they were marked for banishment. On Day 30, Jordan became the second HouseGuest to be banished from the house when she received 78% of the public vote.

HouseGuests were given their new weekly task, which required them to write a poem pertaining to the game. They would then have to jump rope together while the rope holders recited the poem. They had one chance to correctly complete the poem, and failure to do so would result in the group failing the task. They wagered 30% of their shopping budget on the task, which they failed. HouseGuests were later given the task of hosting their own daytime talk show. On Day 36, HouseGuests participated in a live challenge in which they had to vote for one HouseGuest to receive a phone call from home; they voted for George. That night, it was revealed that Cassandra, Josh, and Karen had been marked for banishment due to a tie in the voting process. George was the only HouseGuest to receive no nominations this week. That same night, the HouseGuests were given their new weekly task, which required them to take care of a pug named Chiquita. In the days following her nomination, Karen began to ask the viewers to banish her from the house as she missed her children. HouseGuests were later given their new weekly task, in which they were required to make eight raspberry and eight blueberry pies, and split into teams named after the various pies. The first team to eat all eight of their pies would choose how the weekly allowance was spent. On Day 44, HouseGuests participated in a live challenge in which they were tempted with a reward in exchange for watching the nominations process. They ultimately chose not to watch the nominations, thus were not given a prize. That night, Karen became the third HouseGuest to be banished from the house as she had received 76% of the public vote.

HouseGuests were given their new weekly task, which required them to memorize all of the major highways in the country. They would then be required to state what highways would get them from one city to another. The group wagered 20% of their shopping budget on this task, which they passed. The group was later given a new task in which they were required to paint each other like animals. In another task for the week, HouseGuests competed in a sumo wrestling competition in an attempt to win a luxury massage. Eddie was the winner, with former HouseGuest William secretly giving him a bad massage. For their next weekly task, the HouseGuests were required to have two HouseGuests dancing at all times. When cued, all HouseGuests would be required to dance at the same time. They passed this task, which they wagered 20% of their weekly budget on. On Day 50, the HouseGuests participated in their fourth round of nominations. Due to a tie in the voting, Brittany, Cassandra, Curtis, Eddie, George, and Josh were all marked for banishment. For the first time, all of the HouseGuests received at least one nomination from their fellow HouseGuests. That same night, Jamie won a two-minute conversation with a casting director due to winning a task earlier in the week. HouseGuests were later given a task in which they had to name a "Mr. and Miss Big Brother 2000", with Eddie, Brittany, and Cassandra being given the title; they won a dinner with the meal of their choice. On Day 58, Jamie was given a live task in which she was able to co-host the episode with Julie Chen, including announce who had been banished from the house. That night, it was revealed that Brittany had become the fourth HouseGuest to be banished from the house when she received 34% of the public vote.

HouseGuests were given their new weekly task, which required them to build a puzzle that featured 4,928 pieces by the end of the week. The group wagered 50% of their weekly shopping budget on this task, which they failed. The HouseGuests were later given the task of discussing whether or not they would be willing to split the total prize money. On Day 64, it was revealed that Cassandra, Curtis, and Eddie had been marked for banishment. Much like the previous round of nominations, all of the HouseGuests received at least one nomination from their fellow HouseGuests. Following this, the six remaining HouseGuests were offered $20,000 to walk from the game, with this offer later rising to $50,000. Should one of the HouseGuests accept the offer, a new HouseGuest named Beth Thieme was set to enter the house and the nominations would be voided. Ultimately, none of the HouseGuests took the offer, thus Beth did not enter the game. That same night, Brittany was able to talk to Josh as part of a task. HouseGuests were later given a new task in which they had to estimate the price of a luxury item requested by another HouseGuest. If they came within one dollar of the correct price, they would earn that luxury. For their new weekly task, the HouseGuests had to train Chiquita to go through an obstacle course. The group passed this task, which they wagered 20% of their weekly budget on. During a luxury competition, Curtis won the reward of going to the 52nd Primetime Emmy Awards. On Day 72, HouseGuests were given the live task of writing a message to be flown on a banner plane above the house. That same night, Cassandra became the fifth HouseGuest to be banished from the house as she had received 46% of the public vote.

HouseGuests were given their new weekly task, which required at least one HouseGuest to be juggling at all times. They were not permitted to drop more than two balls, or they would fail the task. The group wagered 50% on the task, which they ultimately failed. On Day 74, the HouseGuests were given another live task in which they had five minutes to make a phone call to a loved one. The timer did not stop while the HouseGuests were dialing. That same night, the group made their nominations live for the first time. It was revealed that Curtis, Eddie, George, and Jamie were marked for banishment. Josh received no nominations this week, and was the only HouseGuest not to be marked for banishment. HouseGuests were later given a new task in which they had to write lyrics for the show's theme song, and were later required to record their song in the Red Room. In another task for the week, the HouseGuests attempted to find Chiquita in the house, with the winner being able to present the weather from inside the house; Josh was the winner. On Day 79, the five remaining HouseGuests were asked to select one of the previously banished HouseGuests to return to the house in a matter of days; they chose Cassandra. That night, George became the sixth HouseGuest to be banished from the house as he had received 51% of the public vote.

HouseGuests were given their new weekly task, in which they were required to determine whether or not specific news articles had actually appeared in the news or not. The group wagered 50% of their weekly shopping budget on the task, which they passed. The group was later given another task in which they played the Big Brother board game. On Day 81, the HouseGuests participated in their second round of live nominations. Due to a tie in the voting, all four of the remaining HouseGuests were marked for banishment. This was the final round of nominations for the season. Former HouseGuest Cassandra entered the house as a guest that same night, as the HouseGuests had selected her to return days prior. Due to a new task, Josh was selected to become a saboteur in the house, and performed tasks such as setting time back on the potato clock. If one of the other three HouseGuests correctly guessed that Josh was the saboteur, they would win a new flat screen television; Curtis won this prize. On Day 86, Jamie became the seventh HouseGuest to be banished from the house as she had received 31% of the public vote. Chiquita also exited the house that night, and was adopted by a couple upon her exit. On Day 88, it was revealed that Curtis became the last HouseGuest to be banished from the house, receiving 14% of the public vote to win. Minutes later, it was revealed that Josh had come in second place with 27% of the public vote, meaning Eddie had been crowned the winner and come in first place with a total of 59% of the public vote.

== Episodes ==
No. overall	No. in season	Title	Original release date	U.S. viewers (millions)
1	1	"Episode 1"	July 5, 2000	22.45
2	2	"Episode 2"	July 6, 2000	11.58
3	3	"Episode 3"	July 7, 2000	9.12
4	4	"Episode 4"	July 8, 2000	6.40
5	5	"Episode 5"	July 10, 2000	10.53
6	6	"Episode 6"	July 11, 2000	8.56
7	7	"Episode 7"	July 13, 2000	10.97
8	8	"Episode 8"	July 14, 2000	8.10
9	9	"Episode 9"	July 15, 2000	6.44
10	10	"Episode 10"	July 17, 2000	9.54
11	11	"Episode 11"	July 18, 2000	8.39
12	12	"Episode 12"	July 20, 2000	11.32
13	13	"Episode 13"	July 21, 2000	7.68
14	14	"Episode 14"	July 22, 2000	5.34
15	15	"Episode 15"	July 24, 2000	10.59
16	16	"Episode 16"	July 25, 2000	7.96
17	17	"Episode 17"	July 26, 2000	16.92
18	18	"Episode 18"	July 27, 2000	8.95
19	19	"Episode 19"	July 28, 2000	7.47
20	20	"Episode 20"	July 29, 2000	5.75
21	21	"Episode 21"	July 31, 2000	9.00
22	22	"Episode 22"	August 1, 2000	8.48
23	23	"Episode 23"	August 2, 2000	17.44
24	24	"Episode 24"	August 3, 2000	7.64
25	25	"Episode 25"	August 4, 2000	6.34
26	26	"Episode 26"	August 5, 2000	5.01
27	27	"Episode 27"	August 7, 2000	8.43
28	28	"Episode 28"	August 8, 2000	7.46
29	29	"Episode 29"	August 9, 2000	17.65
30	30	"Episode 30"	August 10, 2000	7.18
31	31	"Episode 31"	August 12, 2000	5.51
32	32	"Episode 32"	August 14, 2000	10.03
33	33	"Episode 33"	August 15, 2000	7.89
34	34	"Episode 34"	August 16, 2000	17.09
35	35	"Episode 35"	August 17, 2000	7.54
36	36	"Episode 36"	August 18, 2000	6.31
37	37	"Episode 37"	August 21, 2000	9.39
38	38	"Episode 38"	August 22, 2000	7.63
39	39	"Episode 39"	August 24, 2000	8.82
40	40	"Episode 40"	August 25, 2000	6.83
41	41	"Episode 41"	August 26, 2000	5.67
42	42	"Episode 42"	August 28, 2000	9.23
43	43	"Episode 43"	August 29, 2000	7.44
44	44	"Episode 44"	August 30, 2000	11.49
45	45	"Episode 45"	August 31, 2000	7.44
46	46	"Episode 46"	September 1, 2000	6.48
47	47	"Episode 47"	September 2, 2000	5.80
48	48	"Episode 48"	September 4, 2000	8.59
49	49	"Episode 49"	September 5, 2000	7.88
50	50	"Episode 50"	September 6, 2000	11.38
51	51	"Episode 51"	September 7, 2000	7.23
52	52	"Episode 52"	September 8, 2000	6.93
53	53	"Episode 53"	September 9, 2000	6.36
54	54	"Episode 54"	September 11, 2000	9.25
55	55	"Episode 55"	September 12, 2000	8.65
56	56	"Episode 56"	September 13, 2000	12.54
57	57	"Episode 57"	September 14, 2000	8.07
58	58	"Episode 58"	September 15, 2000	6.14
59	59	"Episode 59"	September 16, 2000	6.38
60	60	"Episode 60"	September 18, 2000	7.94
61	61	"Episode 61"	September 19, 2000	8.04
62	62	"Episode 62"	September 20, 2000	9.66
63	63	"Episode 63"	September 21, 2000	7.57
64	64	"Episode 64"	September 22, 2000	6.17
65	65	"Episode 65"	September 23, 2000	6.78
66	66	"Episode 66"	September 25, 2000	8.09
67	67	"Episode 67"	September 26, 2000	7.92
68	68	"Episode 68"	September 27, 2000	9.56
69	69	"Episode 69"	September 28, 2000	8.36
70	70	"Episode 70"	September 29, 2000	11.13

== Nominations table ==
Color key:

Winner
Runner-up
Third place
Banished

Nominations history (season 1)
Contestant	Week							
Contestant	2	4	6	8	10	11	12	
Contestant	2	4	6	8	10	11	Day 82	Finale
Eddie	Jordan; William	Curtis; Jordan	Curtis; Jamie	Curtis; Jamie	Cassandra; Curtis	George; Jamie	Curtis; Jamie	Winner (Day 88)
Josh	Brittany; Curtis	Curtis; George	Curtis; Karen	Cassandra; Curtis	Cassandra; Curtis	Curtis; George	Curtis; Jamie	Runner-up (Day 88)
Curtis	Karen; William	Eddie; Karen	Eddie; Josh	Eddie; Josh	Eddie; George	Eddie; George	Eddie; Josh	Third place (Day 88)
Jamie	Jordan; William	Curtis; Eddie	Josh; Karen	Eddie; George	Cassandra; Eddie	Eddie; George	Eddie; Josh	Banished (Day 86)
George	Jordan; William	Curtis; Jordan	Cassandra; Josh	Brittany; Josh	Curtis; Josh	Curtis; Jamie	Banished (Day 79)	
Cassandra	Brittany; Eddie	Eddie; Jordan	Brittany; Karen	Brittany; George	Eddie; Jamie	Banished (Day 72)		
Brittany	Jordan; William	Curtis; Jordan	Cassandra; Josh	Cassandra; George	Banished (Day 58)			
Karen	Jordan; William	Curtis; Jordan	Cassandra; Josh	Banished (Day 44)				
Jordan	Eddie; Karen	Eddie; Karen	Banished (Day 30)					
William	Brittany; Eddie	Banished (Day 17)						
Marked for banishment	Jordan; William	Curtis; Jordan	Cassandra; Josh; Karen	Brittany; Cassandra; Curtis; Eddie; George; Josh	Cassandra; Curtis; Eddie	Curtis; Eddie; George; Jamie	Curtis; Eddie; Jamie; Josh	Curtis; Eddie; Josh
Banished	William; 73% to banish	Jordan; 78% to banish	Karen; 76% to banish	Brittany; 34% to banish	Cassandra; 46% to banish	George; 51% to banish	Jamie; 31% to banish	Eddie; 59% to win
Banished	William; 73% to banish	Jordan; 78% to banish	Karen; 76% to banish	Brittany; 34% to banish	Cassandra; 46% to banish	George; 51% to banish	Jamie; 31% to banish	Josh; 27% to win
Banished	William; 73% to banish	Jordan; 78% to banish	Karen; 76% to banish	Brittany; 34% to banish	Cassandra; 46% to banish	George; 51% to banish	Jamie; 31% to banish	Curtis; 14% to win

== Production ==
=== Development ===
The series first launched in the Netherlands, with editions in countries such as Germany proving to be hits with the public. Following the international success of the series, a bidding war for the rights to series engaged between CBS, ABC, and a cable network, with the series initially set to last 100 days. Mark Itkin, the senior vice president of William Morris, was quoted as saying, "I had no idea the bidding would be so hot. But the show has so many elements, from being on 100 days in a row to an Internet component that is especially attractive to networks." Ultimately, it was confirmed that the show had been picked up by CBS for an estimated $20 million. It was later reported that production costs added to an estimated $200,000 per episode. Paul Romer, co-creator of the original series, served as the Executive Producer for the series. On the concept, Romer stated "The show is all about human interactions. It's people who are, loving each other, hating each other. They fight, they cry, they laugh -- all emotions, we'll see in the house." In a later interview, Romer added "The first thing people think of when they hear the Big Brother idea are the sexual things, the nudity, the sexual activity in the house [...] That's not what the show is about." The series was one of the first reality shows to air, and required a crew of over 150 people.

The first season of Big Brother featured two hosts, Julie Chen as the main host and Ian O'Malley as a co-host. On earning the job, O'Malley stated "I didn’t really know what it was. This is the ground floor of reality television. [But] SAG went on strike [and it was] a very lengthy and very painful strike for many folks." O'Malley was later released from his contract after only one month on the series; he was bought out of his contract, which he later cited as a "relief". Chen, who hoped to be a part of 60 Minutes in the future, initially turned down the offer to host the series as she did not want to be in the entertainment division of the network. Upon declining the offer, CBS News president Andrew Heyward told Chen that refusal to do the series could be seen as "insubordination". Chen clarified "They said they needed someone who knows how to ask questions on live TV and I asked ‘Am I forever sealing the door on 60 Minutes?’ and [Heyward] said ‘yes,’”. Dr. Drew Pinsky and AOL Online Advisor Regina Lewis appeared once per week on the series to discuss the events in the house. The cast for the series was revealed during the premiere. HouseGuest William was revealed to be a member of the New Black Panther Party, while Jamie was crowned Miss Washington USA the year prior to her participation on the show. HouseGuests Curtis and Josh had done modeling prior to entering the house. Jean Jordan had been an exotic dancer before entering the house, while Karen and George were married and had children. Cassandra and William were both African-American. Series creator John de Mol later stated "The 10 people in our house, you can relate to them. It's the girl next door, it's the guy in the grocery store [...] It's ordinary people, and I think that Big Brother proves ordinary people can be interesting."

The first season of Big Brother premiered on July 5, 2000. The premiere was filmed on July 4, 2000. The series initially aired five nights per week, though a sixth episode was later added into the schedule. The addition of a sixth episode per week caused the live banishment episode to move to Wednesday instead of Thursday. Four of these episodes were half-hour daily recap episodes, while one episode was an hourly-long weekly recap; the sixth episode was the live banishment. During the live banishment, the HouseGuest who exits the house was subject to an interview with host Julie Chen. The first season had a total of 70 episodes, the most for any season to date. This season lasted for a total of 88 days. The theme song for the series, known as "Live", was performed by Jonathan Clarke. It was played during the closing credits of each episode, and segments of the theme were played throughout the show. Viewers of the series could also watch the live feeds in the house, which were available for free on the official website. The feed was edited for music copyrights and to protect the privacy of some contestants. The feeds also featured a disclaimer for users under the age of 21, due to unedited aspect to the feeds.

=== House ===
The house used for the first season was a one-story house with two bedrooms, a kitchen and dining room, and one bathroom. The house was an estimated 1,800 square feet, and was located at the CBS Studio Center in Los Angeles, California. Throughout the house, there are a total of 28 cameras making all areas of the house visible to the cameras, and 60 microphones. During their stay in the house, the HouseGuests were required to wear microphones at all times, ensuring everything they said in the house was heard. Throughout the house the walls are lined with two way mirrors, with a production team filming behind them. The bedrooms featured infrared imaging cameras, allowing the cameras to continue filming while the rooms were dark. The design of the house included bad feng shui, clashing colors and positioning. The house featured bright colors as part of its theme, with the kitchen being a bright blue and the living room yellow. The two bedrooms in the house were identical, with both featuring a bunk bed and three single beds. The bathroom featured one toilet, one shower, a washboard and a washtub. The Red Room was where HouseGuests were required to share their thoughts on the events in the house, and were often given tasks. The backyard of the house featured a patio area where the HouseGuests could sit outside. The backyard also featured a chicken coop, and the HouseGuests were able to use the eggs from the chickens as food.

== Reception ==
=== Ratings ===
Big Brother 1 premiered on July 5, 2000, in the US, with the season premiere having over 22 million viewers. Despite the high premiere, ratings for the series quickly began to decline, and the series quickly dropped out of the Top 10 slot in terms of viewers. Ratings began to decline even more following the banishments of Will "Mega" and Jordan, who were both seen as colorful characters in the game. Big Brother 1 was noted as having its highest ratings on Wednesdays, when it aired after the hugely successful Survivor: Borneo. The Saturday, July 8 episode was beaten out by an episode of the reality series Cops. This episode saw ratings lower from the previous episode. Ratings continued to drop, with at one point the series had fallen behind re-runs of shows such as Friends. The Monday, September 4 episode only achieved 5.5. Cassandra's banishment episode did see an increase in ratings, however, receiving 12.5 million viewers. The finale garnered 11.13 million viewers, beating out the Olympics. Despite the decline in ratings, the series' official website did receive a large amount of traffic, due to the live feed being available there. It was also noted that as the ratings decreased, traffic onto the main site increased. The online aspect of the series "changed both the dynamic in the house and the TV show’s content" according to the LA Daily News. It was also reported that the official website for the series was one of the most popular new websites for the month of July.

=== Public reaction ===
Big Brother 1 has typically been cited as "boring" by critics and fans of the series. John Carman of The San Francisco Chronicle stated "Wondering 'Will Karen run out of Kleenex?' is about the most interesting thing about Big Brother." Comedian Kathy Griffin (who has since become a fan of the series, making guest appearances in Big Brother 16 and Big Brother Takeover (season 17)) mocked the series, stating "Do you guys [watch] those 'tards on Big Brother?" Joyce Millman of Salon.com felt that ratings for the series dropped due to the "boring" cast. The New York Times later reported that CBS was disappointed with the series. Les Moonves, CBS chief, stated that the "casting sucked" for the series, leading to its disappointing run. He later stated "there were more provocative storylines that could have been followed that were dropped." John de Mol, the creator of the series and owner of Endemol, blamed not only the casting but the changes made to the show and format to suit American audiences. Executive producer Paul Romer felt that the group of HouseGuests were "too aware of the cameras" and were concerned with "how they'd look on TV." Former co-host Ian O'Malley claimed he predicted the series would be panned, stating "I knew the critics were probably going to go bananas because of the voyeuristic aspect."

Upon its announcement, the series has come under fire for both controversy and criticism. After the premiere of the first season, Chicago attorney Marvin Rosenblum filed a lawsuit against CBS, then corporate parent Viacom, and the production company Orwell Productions for alleged copyright infringement. Rosenblum, a producer of the film 1984, owns the film and TV rights to the novel Nineteen Eighty-Four and claimed the show "illegally borrows from it." Rosenblum accused the network of illegally using the Big Brother moniker from the novel Nineteen Eighty-Four and "deceiving the public into thinking the author's classic novel was the origin of the show." CBS, Viacom, and Orwell Productions filed a motion to dismiss the $20 million lawsuit. The dismissal was denied on January 4, 2001. In 2001 Rosenblum, CBS and Viacom settled the lawsuit under undisclosed terms. The decision to select Chen as the host of the series caused much debate, mainly due to her role on the talk show The Early Show. Andy Rooney of 60 Minutes said Chen's participation in the series was "a further deterioration of news standards", and further controversy arose when it was revealed some of Chen's lines had been scripted.

Numerous events occurred during the game that sparked controversy as well. The show's security was breached early in the series when two publicity-seeking screenwriters threw a tennis ball stuffed with fake news stories – including one in which then President of the United States, Bill Clinton, purportedly called Big Brother a "national disgrace" - into the house's garden after finding it was unguarded. The HouseGuests were also communicated with by a plane towing a banner reading: "Big Brother is worse than you think. Get out now." The show also came under criticism after HouseGuest George Boswell's wife and family began campaigning for viewers to vote out some of the more popular HouseGuests to keep George in the game. Recently evicted HouseGuest Brittany, who was permitted to talk to Josh for a certain amount of time, informed Josh of this news. Various "anti-George" banners were flown over the house, leading Josh to inform them of the news. Various other points in the game led to the HouseGuests feeling they were being portrayed poorly, and they would often be required to do acts they didn't necessarily feel like doing. George then decided he would walk from the game, and attempted to convince the other HouseGuests to walk with him as well during a live episode. Ultimately, none of the HouseGuests chose to leave the game. There was speculation that CBS had hired for the banners to be flown over the house, though this was never confirmed.

=== Renewal ===
Despite the lack of strong ratings and numerous controversies surrounding the series, Big Brother did help earn CBS a 17% increase for its time slot, and was ultimately renewed in September 2000 for a second season. It was then confirmed, however, that there would be numerous changes to the format of the series.
