= Edward Hardy =

Edward or Ed Hardy may refer to:

- Edward Hardy (politician) (1884–1960), British Labour politician
- Edward Gathorne-Hardy (1901–1978), British socialite
- Edward John Hardy or Chips Hardy (born 1950), English author
- Edward Thomas Hardy or Tom Hardy (born 1977), English actor
- Edward W. Hardy (born 1992), American composer, music director, violinist, and violist
- Ed Hardy (American football) (born 1951), American football offensive guard
- Ed Hardy (brand), a clothing brand by Don Ed Hardy

== See also ==
- Don Ed Hardy (born 1945), American tattoo artist
- Hardy (disambiguation)
