= Hardee =

Hardee may refer to:

- Hardee (surname)
- Hardee County, Florida
- Hardee's, American fast-food restaurant chain
- Hardee hat, popularly worn during the American Civil War by Union Army enlisted men

== See also ==
- Hardy (disambiguation)
