= HMS Hardi =

Two vessels of the Royal Navy have borne the name HMS Hardi, albeit briefly. Both were French privateers that the Royal Navy captured, with the name being the French word for "daring":

- HMS Hardi (1797) was the French 18-gun privateer sloop Hardi that Hazard captured on 1 April 1797. The Navy sold Hardi in 1800.
- HMS Hardi was the French privateer Hardi that HMS Anson captured in 1800. Later that year her name was changed to HMS Rosario. She was broken up in 1809.

== See also ==
- HMS Hardy
