= Big Brother 2 (American season) =

Big Brother
- Season 2
- Big Brother 2 logo
- Hosted by: Julie Chen
- No. of days: 82
- No. of houseguests: 12
- Winner: Will Kirby
- Runner-up: Nicole Schaffrich
- No. of episodes: 30

Release
- Original network: CBS
- Original release: July 5 – September 20, 2001

Additional information
- Filming dates: June 30 – September 20, 2001

Season chronology
- ← Previous; Season 1 Next → Season 3

Big Brother 2 is the second season of the American reality television series Big Brother. It is based upon the Dutch series of the same name, which gained notoriety in 1999 and 2000. The season premiered on CBS on July 5, 2001. The HouseGuests entered the house on June 30 with the series lasting 82 days. The season concluded on September 20, 2001, with Dr. Will Kirby being crowned the winner, and Nicole Nilson Schaffrich the runner-up.

The series revolved around twelve strangers living in a house together with no communication with the outside world. They were constantly filmed during their time in the house and were not permitted to communicate with those filming them. Unlike the first season, the format of the series was revamped to emphasize the competition – with HouseGuests now competing in competitions for power before voting each other out of the house. One HouseGuest, known as the Head of Household, had the task of nominating two of their fellow HouseGuests for eviction. The HouseGuests then voted to evict one of the nominees, with the HouseGuest who received the most votes being evicted from the house. When only two HouseGuests remained, the previously evicted HouseGuests would decide which of them would win the $500,000 grand prize.

== Format ==
Big Brother is a game show in which a group of contestants, referred to as HouseGuests, lived in a custom built "house", constantly under video surveillance. While in the house, the contestants were completely isolated from the outside world, meaning no phone, television, internet, magazines, newspaper, or contact with those not in the house. This rule could be broken, however, in the event of a family emergency or death. At the start of each week in the house, the HouseGuests would compete for the title of Head of Household. The Head of Household for each week would have luxuries such as their own personal bedroom and free laundry service, but was responsible for nominating two HouseGuests for eviction. The Head of Household would not be able to compete in the following week's Head of Household competition, meaning that a HouseGuest could not hold the title for two weeks in a row. All HouseGuests excluding the Head of Household and nominees later vote to determine which of the two nominees should be evicted, and the nominated HouseGuest who received the most votes was evicted during a live episode. If there is a tie in the voting, the reigning Head of Household is required to make the tie-breaker decision. Unlike other versions of Big Brother, the HouseGuests may discuss the nomination and eviction process openly and freely. When only two HouseGuests remained, the previously evicted HouseGuests returned to decide which of the two should win the game.

The HouseGuests also competed in food competitions, in which the losers were required to solely eat peanut butter and jelly for the rest of the week; this twist would later be known as "Have-Not" in future seasons. The HouseGuests also participated in weekly luxury competitions, in which those competing could win prizes. The players were competing for a $500,000 prize, though the Runner-up would receive a $50,000 prize. The format of the series was mainly seen as a social experiment, and required HouseGuests to interact with others who may have differing ideals, beliefs, and prejudices. HouseGuests were also required to make visits to the Diary Room during their stay in the house, where they were able to share their thoughts and feelings on their fellow HouseGuests and the game. While in the house, the HouseGuests are given no information from the outside world. This includes the families and loved ones of the HouseGuests, whom they are not permitted to see or speak to. The house featured no telephones, televisions, or reading material other than for religious use. HouseGuests could voluntarily leave the house at any time, however, would not be able to return. In addition, a HouseGuest could be removed from the house at any time for breaking the rules; removal from the house meant the HouseGuest would not be eligible to return to the house or appear at the finale (which also include voting as a member of the Jury).

== HouseGuests ==
The cast of the second season of Big Brother. Top: Mike Boogie, Monica, Sheryl, Krista, Nicole, Autumn, Bunky and Will Bottom: Shannon, Hardy, Justin and Kent

Name	Age	Occupation	Residence	Result
Will Kirby	28	Physician	Tallahassee, Florida	Winner; Day 82
Nicole Schaffrich	31	Personal chef	Atlanta, Georgia	Runner-up; Day 82
Monica Bailey	40	Candy store manager	Bedford-Stuyvesant, New York	Evicted; Day 77
Hardy Ames-Hill	31	Bouncer	York, Pennsylvania	Evicted; Day 68
Bill "Bunky" Miller	37	Technical writer	Harrisburg, North Carolina	Evicted; Day 61
Krista Stegall	28	Waitress	Opelousas, Louisiana	Evicted; Day 47
Kent Blackwelder	46	Mortgage Broker	Powell, Tennessee	Evicted; Day 40
Mike "Boogie" Malin	30	Bar owner	Los Angeles, California	Evicted; Day 33
Shannon Dragoo	29	Realtor	San Antonio, Texas	Evicted; Day 26
Autumn Daly	28	Aspiring singer	Irving, Texas	Evicted; Day 19
Sheryl Braxton	43	Interior Designer	Ponte Vedra Beach, Florida	Evicted; Day 12
Justin Sebik	26	Investment Operations Associate	Bayonne, New Jersey	Expelled; Day 10

=== Future appearances ===
Mike Malin and Will Kirby returned for Big Brother: All Stars. Bunky Miller and Monica Bailey were also candidates for Big Brother: All Stars, but were not chosen to compete. Nicole Schaffrich made an appearance on Big Brother: All Stars to host a few competitions. Mike Malin also returned for Big Brother 10 to host a food competition along with other Big Brother alumni, before returning for Big Brother 14, where he competed as a coach. In 2013, Kirby moderated the Big Brother 15 jury roundtable segment, a role he would continue to assume annually (excluding Big Brother: All Stars & Big Brother 23 due to the COVID-19 pandemic), until his last appearance during Big Brother 25.

In 2005, Mike Malin and Will Kirby competed on the Bravo reality competition show Battle of the Network Reality Stars. In 2025, Kirby competed on the NBC reality competition show, Deal or No Deal Island.

== Summary ==
On Day 1, the original twelve HouseGuests entered the house. Nicole quickly came off as too strong to her fellow HouseGuests, while Bunky opted not to reveal his sexuality to his housemates. Following the introductions, the HouseGuests competed in their first food competition, "All Stuffed Up". For this competition, they took bags of groceries and attempted to fit them inside a 2002 Buick Rendezvous; they won if they fit all of the groceries plus all of the HouseGuests inside of the car for sixty seconds. The group won the challenge and then learned that the last HouseGuest remaining in the car would keep it. The game came down to Autumn and Kent, with Kent winning. On Day 2, the HouseGuests competed in the "Wheel of First Impressions" Head of Household competition. They spun a wheel that landed on two adjectives, with the HouseGuest who spun choosing the two HouseGuests they felt the adjectives best described. The HouseGuests not selected would then vote between the two selected HouseGuests as to who should become the new Head of Household. The HouseGuest with the fewest votes was eliminated, with this process continuing until only Mike and Sheryl remained. The HouseGuests then voted for which of the two should become the Head of Household, with Mike being the winner. With Mike now in power, Kent attempted to form an alliance between himself, Mike, Justin, Bunky, and Will. Meanwhile, roommates Mike, Will, and Shannon began to form a close bond and later began referring to themselves as Chilltown. Bunky first revealed that he was gay to Autumn and slowly began revealing this information to the other women in the house. Despite his worries that conservative Kent would be upset, all of the HouseGuests came to accept Bunky. Later that week, the HouseGuests competed in the "Dirty Dozen" luxury competition. Mike, as Head of Household, entered an inflatable pool of mud and searched to find a key with the name of a HouseGuest on it; that person then entered the pool and searched for keys as well. If the group found all twelve of the keys within six minutes, they would earn the hot tub; they were successful.

With nominations looming, Mike debated nominating HouseGuests such as Autumn, Kent, and Nicole, seeing them as the most annoying in the group. He later got the idea of nominating a disliked HouseGuest against a well-liked HouseGuest, seemingly ensuring the eviction of the disliked HouseGuest. On Day 6, Mike nominated Nicole and Sheryl for eviction, with Nicole being his target. Shannon and Will began to form a romantic relationship in the house, despite Shannon having a boyfriend. Justin and Krista also became closer, forming a more flirtatious relationship. The HouseGuests formed a dislike towards the Chilltown group, feeling that they were stand-offish and immature. This led to the formation of the Hot Box alliance, named after the heat of the bedroom they slept in, which consisted of Autumn, Bunky, Hardy, Krista, Kent, Monica, and Nicole. The group formed a plan to keep Nicole in the game as a way to weaken the Chilltown alliance. The HouseGuests competed in the "Birds Eye View" luxury competition. For this competition, they had to spell out a word using their bodies, and Head of Household Mike was required to figure out the word; if Mike guessed correctly, they would win the food they spelled. The group was successful. On Day 10, Justin was expelled from the house after an incident with Krista. While making out with an intoxicated Krista, Justin jokingly swung a sweeper at her head and held a knife to her neck. While holding the knife to her neck, he asked her, "Would you get mad if I killed you?" before removing the knife. This incident followed a series of rule-breaking from Justin, and after consulting with the show's psychologist it was decided that he should be expelled. Despite Justin's departure, the scheduled eviction continued. On Day 12, Sheryl became the first HouseGuest to be evicted from the house in a vote of five to three.

Sheryl's eviction came as a shock to the Chilltown group, who had believed that Nicole would be evicted. Following this, the "To the Mat" Head of Household competition was held in the backyard. HouseGuests were asked questions regarding their housemates and answered each question by either stepping off of their individual mat or staying in place; each player was blind-folded and could not see how the others answered. Krista was the winner. Krista asked each HouseGuest individually who should be nominated for eviction, with the majority selecting Shannon and Will. Despite this, Krista didn't see Will as a threat and instead felt that Autumn should be evicted as she often complained about life in the house. On Day 13, the group played in the "Pound of Flesh" food competition. The HouseGuests competed as guys against girls and wrote down the weight they believed they were. The group later weighed themselves in the backyard, and the group with the least difference between their guessed weight and actual weight earned food for the week; the guys won, placing the girls on the peanut butter and jelly diet for the week. On Day 14, Krista shocked the house when she nominated Autumn and Kent for eviction, hoping to see Autumn leave. Krista and Monica, who began to form a strong friendship, formed the Untouchables alliance with Hardy. On Day 15, the HouseGuests competed in the "Ride the Bull" luxury competition. The HouseGuests again competed as men against women and attempted to ride a mechanical bull for a set amount of time; the winning team would earn the ingredients to make a barbecue dinner that night. The women won. On Day 16, it was revealed that the America's Vote for the week determined whether Mike or Krista, who both had birthdays that week, would earn a video message from home and a dinner for two; Krista was selected by the viewers to win the prize and chose to enjoy the dinner with Mike. The house later decided as a group that Autumn should be evicted and return home to her child. On Day 19, Autumn became the second HouseGuest to be evicted from the house in a vote of seven to zero.

Following Autumn's eviction, the group competed in the "By the Numbers" Head of Household competition. Hardy was the winner of the competition, which required the HouseGuests to answer a series of number-based questions by raising numerical paddles. Hardy vowed to evict the Chilltown alliance from the house and quickly decided that two of them would be nominated. Upset with Krista for not nominating Chilltown the week prior, Bunky, Hardy, Kent, Monica, and Nicole formed the TOP, or The Other People, alliance to further go against Chilltown. On Day 20, the HouseGuests competed in the "Catch of the Day" food competition. For this competition, the HouseGuests requested three food items each by writing the food on individual yellow balls. In the backyard, one hundred of the yellow balls were thrown into the backyard, each with a food item written on it, and the HouseGuests were able to eat all the food that was on the balls that they caught. On Day 21, Hardy nominated Shannon and Will for eviction. Hardy's decision to nominate the pair led to much drama, mainly between Shannon and her housemates. When Shannon felt that Hardy was taunting her in the bathroom, she took his toothbrush and used it to scrub the toilet. Shannon was called into the Diary Room and informed that she had to dispose of the toothbrush before Hardy could use it. On Day 22, the group competed in the "Cross Dressing" luxury competition, which led to Bunky, Kent, Nicole, and Shannon winning laundry service for the week. Will debated walking from the game in an attempt to save Shannon, while Shannon requested that her housemates evict her to save Will. That week's America's Choice poll saw the viewers give the HouseGuests a toaster. On Day 26, Shannon became the third HouseGuest to be evicted from the house in a vote of six to zero.

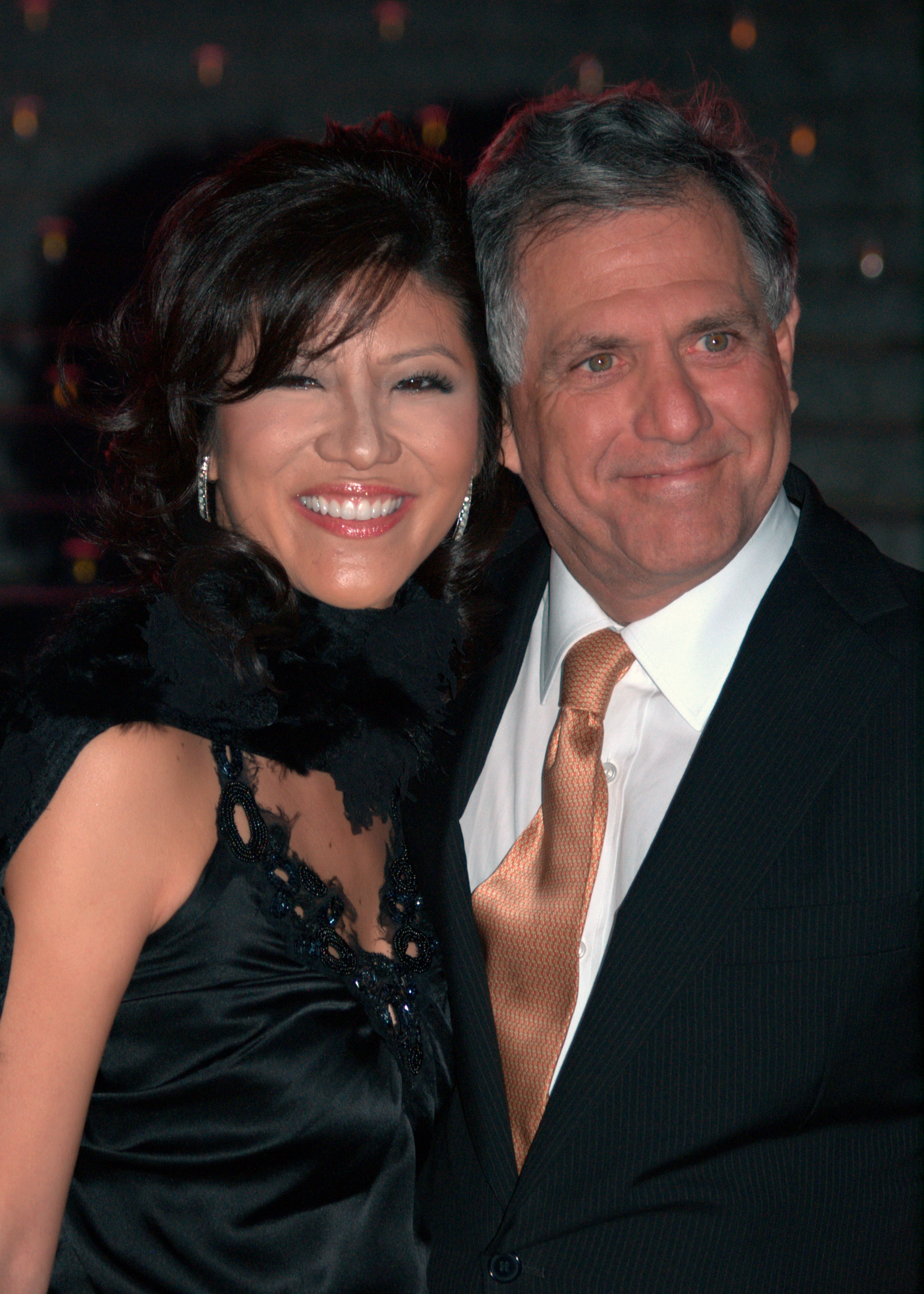
Host Julie Chen (left) interviewed the evicted HouseGuest on the live broadcast.

With Shannon evicted, the remaining HouseGuests participated in the "Higher or Lower" Head of Household competition. The HouseGuests stood in the center of a three-step staircase while being asked numerical-based questions. They would answer questions by either stepping up or down on the ladder to state whether the correct answer was higher or lower than the given answer. Kent was the winner. Though his allies hoped that Mike and Will would be nominated for eviction, Kent felt that Will was not a threat to his game and made a deal with him to keep one another safe. Kent later debated nominating Bunky against Mike, as well as Hardy against Mike. Krista and Mike, who had been growing closer since Justin's expulsion, formed a more romantic relationship. On Day 27, the HouseGuests competed in the "Food Pyramid" food competition. Each HouseGuest was assigned a food group for the week and had to correctly answer questions to win that food group for the house. Mike and Will hoped that Mike would be nominated against Bunky for eviction, feeling they could get the votes to keep Mike; Bunky was upset at his potential nomination, as he and Kent had formed a strong bond. On Day 28, Kent nominated Krista and Mike for eviction, with Mike being his main target. His decision to nominate Mike led to much drama with Mike and the other housemates. On Day 29, the group competed in the luxury competition, known as "Spinning Discs", which saw the HouseGuests tossing CDs at a basket floating in the pool in an attempt to get the highest score. The winner would earn a personal stereo and CD of their choice; Monica was the winner. That week's America's Choice poll allowed Hardy to receive a three-minute phone call from home. Will attempted to campaign for Mike to stay in the house, though Mike refused to do so as he did not want to hurt Krista. With Chilltown dropping in numbers, the TOP alliance began to turn against one another. Monica and Nicole had an argument over cleaning in the house, while Kent and Hardy engaged in an argument over Kent's failed attempt to form an alliance of Bunky, Hardy, and Kent. Following this, Hardy began to steer away from the TOP alliance by forming a secret alliance with Nicole and Will. On Day 33, Mike became the fourth HouseGuest to be evicted from the house in a vote of four to one.

Following Mike's eviction, the HouseGuests competed in the "Face the Facts" Head of Household competition. For this competition, the HouseGuests answered questions pertaining to the previously evicted HouseGuests and the outgoing Head of Household. HouseGuests used a cube to answer each question, with the faces of the HouseGuests on it as well as a "none of the above" space; Hardy was the winner. This made Hardy the first HouseGuest to hold the title twice, as well as the only HouseGuest this season to win consecutive Head of Household competitions. He began thinking about evicting Kent from the house, feeling that he had upset numerous HouseGuests and attempted to make too many alliances. On Day 34, the HouseGuests participated in "The Perfect Meal" food competition. The HouseGuests shared what their favorite meal was and later went to the backyard to find their meal on a plate. Each HouseGuest was assigned a day of the week and were required to put their meal in a blender and drink it within five minutes to earn food for their designated day. On Day 35, Hardy nominated Kent and Will for eviction, with Kent being his target. That night, the HouseGuests were given mannequins to decorate to their likeness. The group learned that this was part of that week's luxury competition and that they had to select a luxury to win within a $100 price range. On Day 36, the HouseGuests competed in the "Rescue 911" competition. The mannequins that the HouseGuests decorated the previous night were hidden inside the house, and the HouseGuests were blindfolded and sent into the house to find the mannequins. The HouseGuests competed men against women, and the winning team would get the luxury prizes they selected; the women won the competition. On Day 37, it was revealed that the viewers had voted for the HouseGuests to get a pot belly pig, Ophelia, as a pet for the week. With Kent realizing that he would be evicted, and Bunky being a target for the coming week, the two began to engage in arguments with their fellow housemates. This further tore apart the TOP alliance and seemingly ensured Kent's eviction. On Day 40, Kent became the fifth HouseGuest to be evicted from the house in a vote of four to zero.

The remaining six HouseGuests entered the backyard to participate in the "Pushing It to the Limit" Head of Household competition. This competition saw the HouseGuests sliding their key to the house down a two-lane board towards a series of markers, each representing a different room in the house. The HouseGuest who landed their key closest to the room labeled HoH would become the new Head of Household; Nicole was the winner. Krista revealed to Will the Untouchables group, prompting Will to exaggerate the story to Nicole and cause doubt in her mind about Krista and Hardy. Hardy and Nicole began to realize that Krista had lied to numerous HouseGuests, and the two turned against her. On Day 41, the HouseGuests competed in the "A Is For Apple" food competition, which required HouseGuests to spell food items out of large plastic letters to earn them for the week. On Day 42, Nicole chose to nominate Krista and Monica for eviction, with Krista being her target. On Day 43, the group played in the "All the News That Fits" luxury competition. The HouseGuests participated as duos and attempted to guess whether news headlines given to them were true or false; the winning pair would win three minutes in the Diary Room with newspapers, magazines, and a newsreel playing on the television. Bunky and Will were the winning duo. On Day 44, the HouseGuests were given a trampoline as part of that week's America's Choice poll. The HouseGuests learned that week that the eviction vote would take place live on Thursday, rather than the group voting on Wednesday. On Day 47, Krista became the sixth HouseGuest to be evicted from the house in a vote of three to zero.

The final five HouseGuests learned that there would be no eviction for the week as a result of Justin's expulsion from the game. This meant that the group did not participate in a Head of Household competition, and there were no nominations for the week; the group did participate in food and luxury competitions. On Day 48, the HouseGuests competed in the "Blockbuster" luxury competition, hosted by Bunky. HouseGuests were given ice blocks with a movie ticket in the center, and were required to break through the ice to reach their ticket. The first HouseGuest to get their ticket out of the ice would be able to watch a screening of the film American Pie 2 (2001) in the Head of Household room. Bunky was the winner, and chose Monica to join him. Despite being aligned with him, Hardy and Nicole began to yet again have doubts about Will, believing he was stirring the pot too much. On Day 50, the HouseGuests participated in the "An Offer Almost Too Good to Refuse" food competition. For this competition, HouseGuests searched the house to find jars of peanut butter that had been hidden; the HouseGuests were required to stay where they found their jar. The HouseGuests were individually called into the Diary Room and offered $2,500 to put the HouseGuests on the peanut butter and jelly diet; should the HouseGuest decline this, the offer would be raised to $5,000 and then $7,500. Bunky and Hardy accepted, though Bunky had the highest number on his peanut butter jar and thus won the $5,000 prize. Bunky and Hardy both admitted to accepting the offer, upsetting Monica and Nicole. That same day, Bunky won the America's Choice poll to receive a letter from home.

On Day 51, the HouseGuests competed in the first round of the "Big Brother Road Trip" Head of Household competition. For this competition, the HouseGuests answered questions regarding the evicted HouseGuests with the answers being states. To gain a point, a HouseGuest had to be the first to strike a pole by driving a remote-control car; the two HouseGuests with the most points would move on to the second round. Bunky and Hardy advanced to the second round. On Day 52, Bunky and Hardy competed in the second round of the Head of Household competition. For this, the two had to drive their remote-control car through an obstacle course; each obstacle was based on the home state of an evicted HouseGuests, and the two had to drive their cars to approach each obstacle in the order that the HouseGuests were evicted. Hardy was the winner, giving him his third Head of Household win of the season. On Day 55, the HouseGuests competed in the "Big Brother Jenga" food competition. For this competition, the HouseGuests built a Jenga puzzle out of oversized pieces with food categories listed on them. They would then pull out the pieces one at a time, earning each category they removed without knocking over the tower. That night, Hardy nominated Bunky and Will for eviction, seeing Bunky as a physical threat due to his recent competition wins. Due to the low number of HouseGuests remaining in the house, the bedroom closest to the bathroom was shut down; the HouseGuests were allowed to paint the room before it was closed for good. On Day 56, the HouseGuests competed in "The Great Escape" luxury competition. The HouseGuests decorated a doll to their likeness and later found their dolls outside in individual baskets. They had to blow up helium balloons, tie them to their doll's basket, and attempt to make their basket float over the walls of the house; the first two HouseGuests to complete this challenge would win a helicopter tour of Los Angeles. Will was the first to complete the challenge, with Bunky coming in second. Though the plan was to initially evict Bunky, Nicole continued to grow frustrated with Will and contemplated evicting him; the two later made up. The America's Choice poll saw the HouseGuests getting an in-house shopping spree for sportswear clothing. On Day 61, the eviction vote came to a tie, with Hardy casting the tie-breaker vote to evict Bunky.

Following Bunky's eviction, the HouseGuests competed in the "Strange Bedfellows" endurance Head of Household competition. The HouseGuests found a replica of the Head of Household room in the backyard and had to sit on the water bed in the backyard while holding onto their key that was placed in the nomination box. The last HouseGuests remaining on the bed, without letting go of their key, would be the winner. The competition quickly proved to be dramatic when a banner overhead sent by Nicole's husband accused her of betraying him; this was a result of a rumor spread online that something had happened between Nicole and Will in the hot tub. The competition came down to Monica and Will, with Will dropping out in exchange for a prize; this made Monica the new Head of Household. Will's prize was revealed to be a large peanut butter jar used in an earlier competition. Hardy and Nicole were both upset with Will for throwing the competition, as Will and Monica had made a deal that Will would not be nominated. On Day 62, the group played in the "Shop 'til You Drop" food competition, which required the HouseGuests to grab food items and carry them through an obstacle course; the group kept whatever food they got across. On Day 63, Monica nominated Hardy and Nicole for eviction. On Day 64, the backyard was transformed into a "winter wonderland" as part of the America's Choice poll. On Day 65, Gervase Peterson and Susan Hawk, of Survivor: Borneo (2000), and Alicia Calaway and Jeff Varner of, Survivor: The Australian Outback (2001), entered the house to spend the night. The group played in the "Fire and Ice" luxury competition, which saw the Survivor cast compete against the HouseGuests. The groups were bound together at the wrists and had to find the letters to spell out the name of their respective show; they would build the letters into a tower, untie themselves, jump one at a time into the pool to retrieve their keys, and hang their keys on torches at the end of the pool. The first team to complete the challenge would win a $15,000 prize; the Survivor group won the competition. That same night, the HouseGuests paired up with a Survivor member to compete in the "Crack the Code" luxury competition. The competition saw the pairs receiving a coded message, describing a location in the house, and the first pair to decode the location and find a computer mouse would win the right to view a fan-site made in their honor. On Day 68, Will chose to evict Hardy from the house.

The final three HouseGuests then competed in the first round of the three-part final Head of Household competition. For the first two rounds the HouseGuest completed for points which would determine who would proceed to the final round. The first part of the competition saw Monica, Nicole, and Will determining which HouseGuest was being described by a specific adjective used by a former HouseGuest, with points being given for correct answers. Will was the winner with 5, Nicole in second on 4 and Monica in third with 3 points. The second round of the competition saw the HouseGuest complete an obstacle course of various household chores with in 6 minutes. Time was not a factor, instead points were awarded for each task completed; Nicole was the winner with 7, Monica was in second with 6 and Will came in last with 5. Once the scores were added up, it was Nicole (11 points) and Will (10 points) who would progress to the final round of the competition. Following the September 11th attacks, the rule stating that the HouseGuests would not be informed of world news was broken, and Monica learned that her cousin Tamitha had been in the buildings at the time of the attacks. Though the HouseGuests were initially only given the basics of the events that had occurred, they were later given a more detailed description of the events. On Day 77, Nicole and Will competed in the final round of the Head of Household competition, which saw the two being asked seven questions about their former housemates' experiences during their time in the house. Nicole was the winner, making her the final Head of Household of the season; she then chose to evict Monica from the house, making Nicole and Will the final two HouseGuests.

On Day 82, the evicted HouseGuests returned to choose whether Nicole or Will should win the series. Nicole and Will learned that they could each nullify one HouseGuest's vote for the winner; Nicole chose to void Shannon's vote, while Will reluctantly chose to void Bunky's vote – he was so confident that he felt he didn't need to nullify a vote but the producers required that he do so (while it was surprising that Will voided Bunky's vote instead of Hardy to many viewers, Will said that Bunky was a sincere player and his disgust with Will's tactics and previous statement that he would never vote to give Will the winner's money meant that he was the right person to remove from Nicole's vote side). Both Nicole and Will guessed correctly and took a vote for each other out of the final tally. Nicole emphasized how evil Will was to an increasingly unimpressed jury that took pains to point out that she always cried about how awful it was to vote people out yet directly ended several of their games because she wanted to win (Monica followed up on an earlier interview where she'd said Nicole's claims of "love" for other players were selfish and aimed at boosting her own ego), while Will reminded the jury how charismatic he was through his final speech, though he appeared to irk some of the jurors who interpreted his charisma as arrogance and condescension. Dr. Will was crowned the winner of the series in a five to two vote, with Will receiving the votes of Krista, Mike, Kent, Sheryl, and Monica, as Nicole received votes from Autumn and Hardy.

== Episodes ==
No. overall	No. in season	Title	Original release date	U.S. viewers (millions)
Week 1
71	1	"Episode 1"	July 5, 2001	8.18
72	2	"Episode 2"	July 7, 2001	5.03
73	3	"Episode 3"	July 10, 2001	8.27
74	4	"Episode 4"	July 12, 2001	9.06
Week 2
75	5	"Episode 5"	July 14, 2001	5.16
76	6	"Episode 6"	July 17, 2001	8.31
77	7	"Episode 7"	July 19, 2001	8.80
Week 3
78	8	"Episode 8"	July 21, 2001	5.13
79	9	"Episode 9"	July 24, 2001	7.82
80	10	"Episode 10"	July 26, 2001	8.88
Week 4
81	11	"Episode 11"	July 28, 2001	5.93
82	12	"Episode 12"	July 31, 2001	8.12
83	13	"Episode 13"	August 2, 2001	8.72
Week 5
84	14	"Episode 14"	August 4, 2001	5.73
85	15	"Episode 15"	August 7, 2001	8.90
86	16	"Episode 16"	August 9, 2001	9.66
Week 6
87	17	"Episode 17"	August 11, 2001	5.46
88	18	"Episode 18"	August 14, 2001	8.31
89	19	"Episode 19"	August 16, 2001	9.16
Week 7
90	20	"Episode 20"	August 21, 2001	9.30
91	21	"Episode 21"	August 22, 2001	9.14
Week 8
92	22	"Episode 22"	August 25, 2001	7.12
93	23	"Episode 23"	August 28, 2001	9.75
94	24	"Episode 24"	August 30, 2001	10.26
Week 9
95	25	"Episode 25"	September 4, 2001	11.19
96	26	"Episode 26"	September 5, 2001	11.03
97	27	"Episode 27"	September 6, 2001	10.71
Week 10
98	28	"Episode 28"	September 18, 2001	11.85
99	29	"Episode 29"	September 18, 2001	11.85
100	30	"Episode 30"	September 20, 2001	12.38

== Voting history ==
Color key:

Winner
Runner-up
Head of Household
Nominated for eviction
Evicted
Expelled by production

Voting history (season 2)
	Week 1	Week 2	Week 3	Week 4	Week 5	Week 6	Week 8	Week 9	Week 10 (Note: Due to the attacks on the World Trade Center on September 11, the eviction initially scheduled for day 75 was postponed to day 77.)	Finale
Head of Household	Boogie	Krista	Hardy	Kent	Hardy	Nicole	Hardy	Monica	Nicole	(None)
Nominations	Nicole; Sheryl	Autumn; Kent	Shannon; Will	Boogie; Krista	Kent; Will	Krista; Monica	Bunky; Will	Hardy; Nicole	Monica; Will	(None)
Will	Nicole	Autumn	Nominated	Krista	Nominated	Krista	Nominated	Hardy	Nominated	Winner
Nicole	Nominated	Autumn	Shannon	Boogie	Kent	Head of Household	Bunky	Nominated	Monica (Note: As Head of Household, Nicole chose to evict Monica.)	Runner-up
Monica	Nicole	Autumn	Shannon	Boogie	Kent	Nominated	Will	Head of Household	Evicted (Day 77)	Will
Hardy	Sheryl	Autumn	Head of Household	Boogie	Head of Household	Krista	Bunky (Note: As the house's vote was tied, the Head of Household cast the tie-breaker vote.)	Nominated	Evicted (Day 68)	Nicole
Bunky	Sheryl	Autumn	Shannon	Boogie	Kent	Krista	Nominated	Evicted (Day 61)		~~Nicole~~ (Note: Will and Nicole had to nullify the vote of one juror each, without knowing for whom their votes were cast. Nicole and Will respectively chose Shannon and Bunky.)
Krista	Sheryl	Head of Household	Shannon	Nominated	Kent	Nominated	Evicted (Day 47)			Will
Kent	Sheryl	Nominated	Shannon	Head of Household	Nominated	Evicted (Day 40)				Will
Boogie	Head of Household	Autumn	Shannon	Nominated	Evicted (Day 33)					Will
Shannon	Nicole	Autumn	Nominated	Evicted (Day 26)						~~Will~~
Autumn	Sheryl	Nominated	Evicted (Day 19)							Nicole
Sheryl	Nominated	Evicted (Day 12)								Will
Justin	Expelled (Day 10)									
Evicted	Sheryl; 5 of 8 votes to evict	Autumn; 7 of 7 votes to evict	Shannon; 6 of 6 votes to evict	Boogie; 4 of 5 votes to evict	Kent; 4 of 4 votes to evict	Krista; 3 of 3 votes to evict	Bunky; 2 of 3 votes to evict	Hardy; Will's choice to evict	Monica; Nicole's choice to evict	Will; 5 votes to win
Evicted	Sheryl; 5 of 8 votes to evict	Autumn; 7 of 7 votes to evict	Shannon; 6 of 6 votes to evict	Boogie; 4 of 5 votes to evict	Kent; 4 of 4 votes to evict	Krista; 3 of 3 votes to evict	Bunky; 2 of 3 votes to evict	Hardy; Will's choice to evict	Monica; Nicole's choice to evict	Nicole; 2 votes to win

== Development ==
"From an economic standpoint, Big Brother was an economic success. Creatively, we saw the potential. It was worth bringing back, but obviously there are things that needed to be changed. Arnold came in with such wonderful ideas. He had a tremendous amount of enthusiasm for the series."

— Nancy Tellem, CBS Entertainment president, on the decision to change the series.

Despite the negative critical response to the first season, rumors began circulating in September 2000 that the series would be renewed and would give CBS more creative control over the project. Les Moonves later stated that the possibility of a second season was "very possible", adding "If we can fix the product... we feel there's great potential there." In February 2001, it was confirmed that there would be a second season, and that casting would begin soon. Paul Romer, who was heavily involved in the first season, stated that the show had poor ratings as the critics "didn't get it." It was reported that CBS blamed the casting for the failure of the initial season. With the confirmation of a second season, it was revealed that the series would undergo serious changes before the premiere. Before work on the season began, numerous changes were made in terms of the production team. CBS later stated they hoped to get Arnold Shapiro to produce the series, and were eventually successful in doing so. Allison Grodner was yet another addition to the series this year, who was hired as the co-executive producer.

The season was originally planned to air five nights a week, though this was later dropped to three nights a week. The show was set to air on Tuesday, Thursday, and Saturday nights at 8 p.m. Eastern Time, though in August was pushed back to 9 pm. Eastern Time due to the show's mature content. The live show, in which one of the HouseGuests was evicted from the house, was scheduled to air on Thursday nights. Chuck Riley became the narrator for this season, however, played a smaller role in the show than in the previous season. Initially, it was revealed that the HouseGuests would vote to evict one another, with the viewers choosing the winner out of the final three. This was later scrapped, and it was decided that the HouseGuests would choose the winner and the evictees. Like the previous installment, Big Brother 2 featured the live feed streaming, in which viewers could watch live inside the house at any time. This was the first season to charge for the live feeds to be used, with viewers paying either $19.95 to view the full season or $9.95 for a month of the feeds. The decision to require a payment for the feeds upset numerous fans and viewers, several of which threatened not to watch the series at all. A spokesperson for CBS later stated "The subscription does two things [...] It safeguards against who's watching live feed so we can verify their age [in case there's nudity]. Second, in entertainment you generally pay for content, so I don't think this is anything unusual."

Despite controversy surrounding her appearance on the series, it was confirmed in May that Julie Chen would return to host the second season. In another change to the series, Dr. Drew Pinsky and AOL Online Advisor Regina Lewis did not return to the series. Following the departure of co-host Ian O'Malley during the first season, no second host was selected for the series. The twelve HouseGuests competing in the series were revealed on June 29, 2001. The group moved into the house on July 1, 2001. HouseGuests Mike and Justin had a criminal record prior to appearing on the series, causing some controversy from critics. HouseGuest Will was a doctor, while Kent and Mike both owned their own businesses. Autumn, Kent, Krista, and Sheryl were all parents, though Kent was the only parent who was married. Bunky was revealed to be the first openly gay HouseGuest to participate in the series, while Kent revealed prior to the season that he felt homosexuality was "perverse". The HouseGuests from this season were noted as being more disruptive than in the previous year's show, with several arguments and romantic relationships occurring in the house. Shapiro stated that the new group of HouseGuests were "uninhibited, outgoing and diverse", and predicted "romance and nudity" from the group.

=== House ===
The house used for the second season was a one-story house with four bedrooms, a kitchen and dining room, and one bathroom. The floorpan of the original house was retained with alterations made for additional sleeping areas, the Head of Household room, and relocated storage area and Diary Room. The house was an estimated 2,400 feet, an increase from the previous season's house. The lot used for the house was located at the CBS Studio Center in Hollywood, California. It featured a total of 38 cameras and 62 microphones, making all areas of the house visible. During their stay in the house, the HouseGuests were required to wear microphones at all times, ensuring everything they said in the house was heard. Throughout the house there are two way mirrors lined against the walls, with a production team filming behind them. The bedrooms featured infrared night vision cameras, allowing the cameras to continue filming while the lights were off. The majority of the living room features red colors, as did the kitchen and dining room. The dining room saw the inclusion of a round table, where the weekly nomination ceremony would take place. The bathroom featured mainly light green and cream colors. There were three bedrooms eligible for all of the HouseGuests to use, while one was reserve solely for the Head of Household. The bedrooms all had uneven beds, some being water beds and other being simple cots, and two bedrooms featured a plexi-glass wall dividing them. The Head of Household bedroom featured items such as a mini fridge and monogrammed robe. The backyard featured a patio area for the HouseGuests to sit, as well as a pool, Jacuzzi, and basketball court.

== Reception ==
=== Ratings ===
Big Brother 2 premiered on July 5, 2001, to a viewing audience of 8.2 million viewers. These numbers were significantly lower than the previous season's premiere, however, it was noted that ratings did increase in the second half-hour. The series was later the third most searched topic on the internet according to Lycos days following the premiere. The July 10 episode had a total of 8.3 million viewers, slightly higher than the premiere episode's ratings. The first eviction of the season, which featured both Sheryl's eviction and the expulsion of Justin, garnered 9.2 million viewers; the episode was the most watched in its time slot. Speaking on the topic of the ratings for the series, Les Moonves stated that he felt the series was "worthwhile" but "required diligence". The August 7 episode of the series had 8.9 million viewers, the second highest rated episode of the season at that point. The season finale garnered a total of 12.3 million viewers, making it the highest rated episode of the season; these numbers were noted as higher than the previous year's finale. In July, it was reported that an estimated 14,000 viewers had subscribed to view the live feeds. It was later reported by RealPlayer that over 25,000 subscriptions had been made to the feeds. Following the season finale, it was confirmed that 56,026 viewers paid for the full season of the live feeds, while 41,814 existing Gold Pass members viewed the feeds. CBS reported that the numbers "exceeded [their] expectations."

=== Public reaction ===
Unlike the first season, Big Brother 2 was well received by critics and fans. A CBS executive said that the revamped series was "compelling and interesting". Variety said of the season "The HouseGuests of 'BB2' are louder, bawdier and meaner than the comparatively tame folks of the first 'Big Brother'." On the online success of the series, RealPlayer stated "The popularity of the [program] is a testament to the power of the Internet as a new vehicle for television networks to deliver subscription programming to viewers." Shapiro later stated he wished he could edit what was shown on the live feeds, feeling that the feeds took from the "suspense" of the episode being broadcast. The second season is often noted by fans as a favorite, with numerous HouseGuests from the season coming back for future installments. Will is often regarded by fans as the greatest player to ever play the game following his appearance on the show. Shannon's decision to use Hardy's toothbrush to clean the toilet later became one of the more infamous moments in the series history, and is often remembered by fans. HouseGuests Bunky, Mike, Monica, and Will were all candidates to appear on Big Brother: All-Stars (2006), though only Mike and Will were selected to return. HouseGuests Hardy and Nicole both made appearances that season as well. Bunky later made an appearance on Big Brother 10 (2008) during a food competition that featured one representative from each past season. Mike was interviewed during Big Brother 11 along with three other former HouseGuests. Mike later joined the cast of Big Brother 14 (2012) initially as a mentor to new HouseGuests before becoming an official HouseGuest himself. This made Mike one of two former HouseGuests to have competed in the series three times. Will made an appearance on every season from Big Brother 15 (2013) to Big Brother 21 (2019) as the moderator at the Jury roundtable discussion for the final three.

The expulsion of Justin came with much controversy, as Justin had previously received warnings from production for intimidating behavior, threatening other housemates, and drunkenly urinating on a window. Justin's antics led several to request he receive a penalty nomination, while Hardy debated walking due to Justin's actions. Following the incident in which Justin held a knife to Krista's neck, he was expelled from the house. Krista, who was drunk at the time, later claimed to have no memory of the incident, and felt that CBS had "[blown the incident] completely out of proportion." Despite this statement, Krista later hired attorney L. Clayton Burgess and sued CBS for "damages for negligence on the part of CBS and the producers, pain and suffering, mental anguish, medical bills, mental impairment and loss of enjoyment of life." Justin felt that he should not have been removed from the house for his actions, telling host Julie Chen "If there's anyone that could perceive that as an act of violence or as a threat, then you're an idiot." Other events in the house, namely Autumn and Mike engaging in arguments over which one tried to seduce the other at one point, caused a stir amongst viewers. Several of the HouseGuests came under fire for having previous arrest records. Mike "Boogie" Malin had been arrested for filming footage of the then-unreleased film Batman & Robin (1997), receiving five misdemeanor charges. Justin had previously been arrested once for "simple assault" and twice for "minor robberies". Krista had been arrested for battery after an argument with a boyfriend, though lied about this to producers prior to entering the house. Shannon and Mike came under fire for numerous slanderous remarks about Hardy, including calling him a "future rapist and child molester" and plotting to spread a rumor that he was gay; they were not spoken to by production for these comments.
