= Hardys =

Hardys may refer to:

- The Hardys, professional wrestling tag team
- Hardee's, American fast-food restaurant chain

== See also ==
- Hardy (disambiguation)
