= Hardy Lucas =

Commissioner of the Anti Corruption Commission Seychelles

Personal details
- Occupation: Politician

Hardy Lucas is a former member of the National Assembly of Seychelles. He is a member of the Seychelles National Party, and was elected to the Assembly in 2002 and held his position until 2009. He was then a board member of the Public Service Appeals Board 2009 - 2014 and is currently a Commissioner of the Anti Corruption Commission Seychelles (ACCS).
