= Hardy Town, Gibraltar =

Shanty town in Gibraltar, 1779 to 1783

Coordinates: 36.123282°N 5.348567°W

Hardy Town
- Shanty town
- Nicknames: New Jerusalem, Black Town, Coward's Retreat, Female Camp
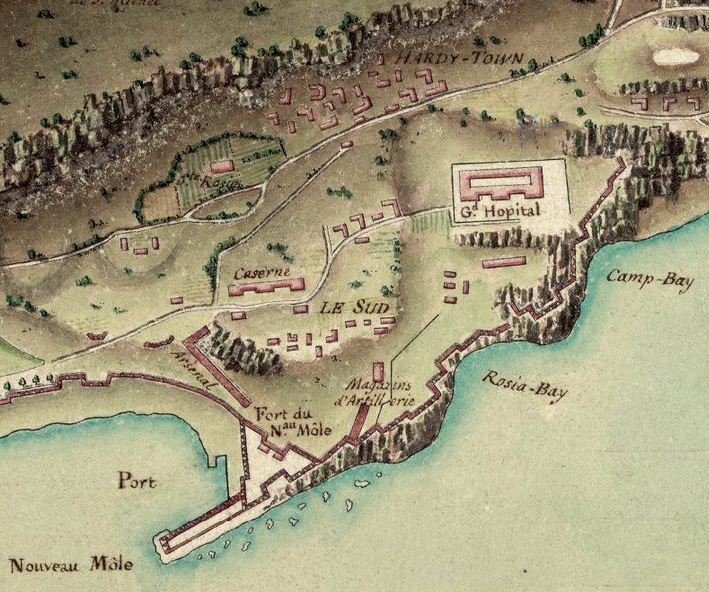
- Hardy Town depicted on a 1799 map of Gibraltar (top of map; north is at the left)
- Country: Gibraltar
- Established: 1779

Hardy Town was a temporary civilian settlement established near the south end of the Gibraltar peninsula during the Great Siege of Gibraltar (1779–83). The intensive Spanish and French bombardment reduced the town of Gibraltar to ruins and prompted many of its inhabitants, and eventually the off-duty members of the British garrison, to relocate to a spot out of range of the enemy's land-based guns (though as they discovered, they were still vulnerable to naval gunfire). After it became known for its appalling conditions, a British quartermaster named Hardy was put in charge of the settlement and it acquired his name. Hardy Town was eventually abandoned and torn down after the siege ended and the population moved back to Gibraltar's main town within the city walls.

== Establishment ==
Despite the fighting during the siege, many civilians remained alongside the British garrison to endure four years of Spanish and French bombardment. Gibraltar's civilian inhabitants found themselves in a precarious position when the siege began. They were required by the garrison to maintain six months' worth of provisions for themselves in case of siege but most had not done so. Many left Gibraltar but some, as Colonel John Drinkwater wrote, "were induced to weather out the storm, by the property they had in the garrison, which was probably their all, and which they could not remove with themselves."

In August 1779, the civilians were given permission to "erect wooden huts and sheds at the southward, above the Naval hospital, whither they removed their principal papers, &c. that they might be secure from the annoyance of the enemy, in case the town should be bombarded." When the bombardment began, it produced scenes of chaos. The inhabitants were

in deepest distress; mothers were seen clasping their tender infants; children were running wildly about scared and crying; while the careful male part were busily employed in packing up their most portable and valuable effects to convey them to [Hardy Town].

Samuel Ancell, an eyewitness to the siege, wrote about the establishment of Hardy Town in a letter to his brother:

The inhabitants have begun erecting temporary sheds — some in the Gullies between Buena Vista and Europa, others on Windmill-hill, nor is there scarce any part of the Rock, out of the reach of the enemy's land fire, but what is covered with marquees, tents, huts, &c. &c. Timber is taken from the ruins of the town to answer this necessary business, and the employment occasioned thereby keeps all hands busy.

== Living conditions ==
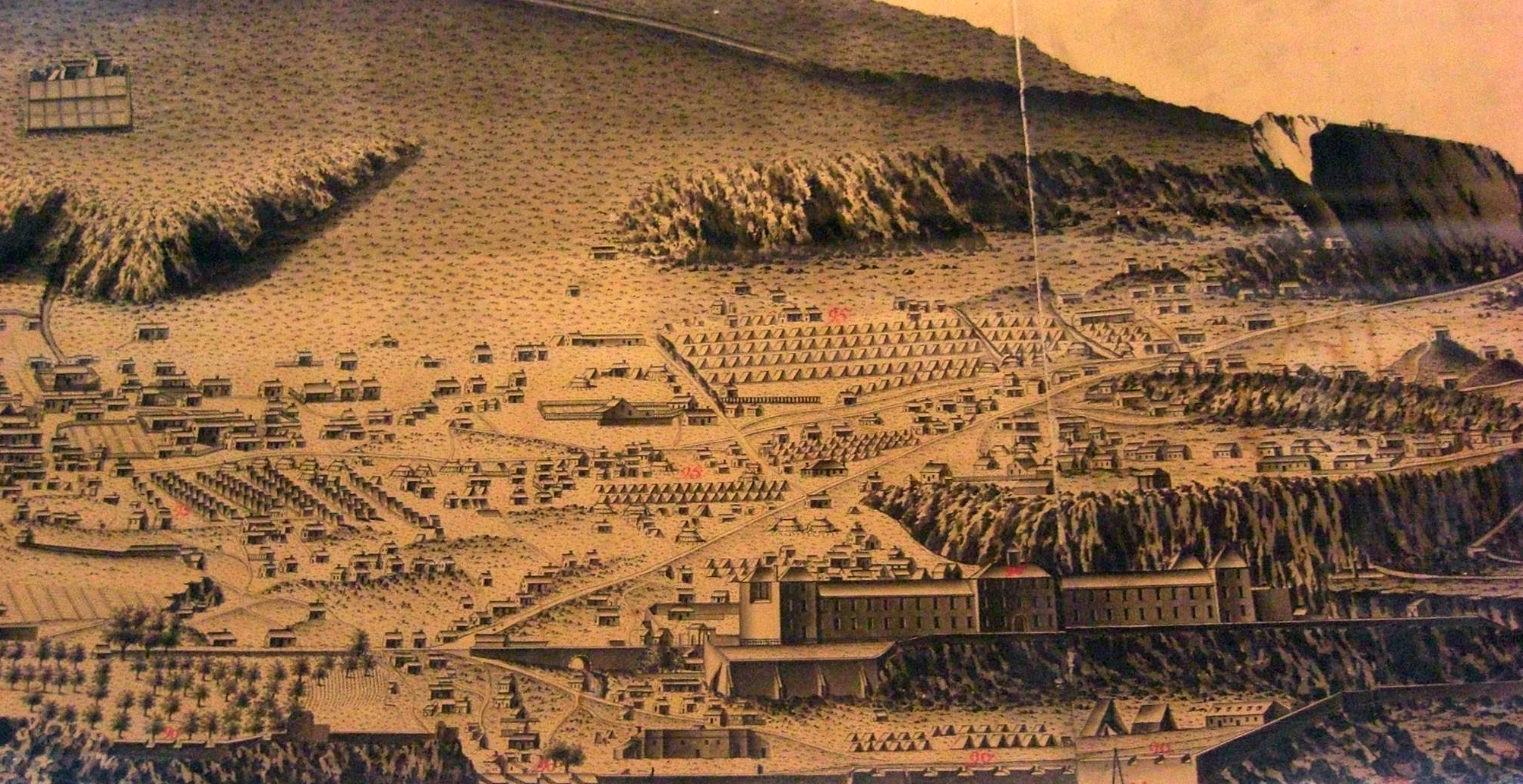
A 1782 Spanish view of Hardy Town and the nearby military encampment as seen from the Bay of Gibraltar

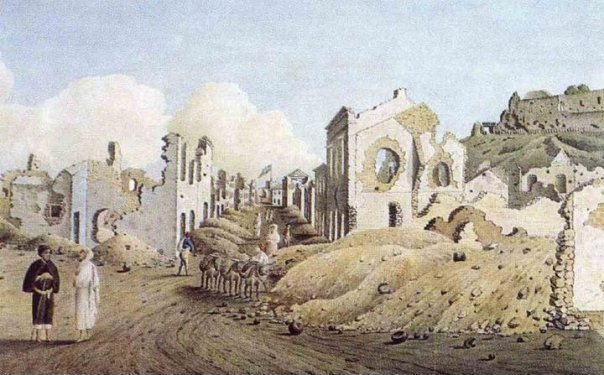
The ruins of the town of Gibraltar in 1793

The huts soon became a shanty town, situated out of range of the Spanish land batteries at a spot near the southern end of the peninsula, between the Naval Hospital and the South Barracks on the road leading to Europa Point (now Europa Road). It was first jokingly dubbed New Jerusalem but the appallingly unhygienic conditions led to it being renamed Black Town. A British Army quartermaster named Major Hardy was put in charge of the encampment, and it was eventually called Hardy Town after him. The garrison were somewhat less complimentary and called it the Cowards' Retreat or the Female Camp.

Although the camp was out of reach of the land batteries, it was still vulnerable to cannon-fire coming from Spanish gunboats in the Bay of Gibraltar. In May 1781, a shell from a gunboat was recorded as having hit a house in Hardy Town and "killed Mr. Israel, a very respectable Jew, with Mrs. Tourale, a female relation, and his clerk." One soldier recorded:

The Spanish shells discovered many private and valuable stores [in the town] which were hoarded up by Jews and Genueses [Genoese] in order to mass their fortunes by extortion; but their little alls are now distroyed [sic] and themselves as lost sheep obliged to brooze upon the Rocks under the shelter of hutts [sic], caves, cliffs and tents at a place the Military call Cowards retreat, which lies out of the line of land-fire: But when the Gun-boats appear, it is shocking to behold them half-naked running to Cracks and Corners to save their lives, such is the disolation [sic] of these unhappy inhabitants.

It was not just the Jews and Genoese who lived there, as eventually many of the British soldiers and officers did so too. The enemy bombardment made the town of Gibraltar uninhabitable. By the start of 1781, as Drinkwater recorded:

scarce a house, north of the Grand parade, was tenantable; all of them were deserted. Some few, near South-port, continued to be inhabited by soldiers' families; but in general the floors and roofs were destroyed, and the bare shell only was left standing.

Even the Governor left the town, living during the daytime in a large tent in the south of the peninsula but returning at night. Off-duty soldiers encamped in Hardy Town, and one writer records an incident in which part of a shell given extra range by a strong wind "fell into the house of a Mr. Maxwell... and made its way through the bed of Major Baugh, of the 39th regiment, who then resided in said house".

By the end of the siege, the civilian population of Gibraltar had fallen to fewer than 1,000 people, the rest having either fled abroad, died of starvation or disease, or killed by shellfire. However, people soon returned to begin the work of rebuilding the ruined town and by 1787, four years later, the number of civilians had bounced back to 3,386.

== Bibliography ==
- Ancell, Samuel. A circumstantial journal of the blockade and siege of Gibraltar, from the 12th Sept., 1779 to the 23d. Feb., 1783. Cork: A. Edwards. OCLC 264989958.
- Cornwell, B. (1782). A Description of Gibraltar: with an account of the blockade, siege, the attempt by nine sail of fire ships, the sally made from the garrison, and every thing remarkable or worthy notice that has occurred in that place since the commencement of the Spanish war. London: B. Cornwell. OCLC 17414283.
- Drinkwater, John (1786). A history of the late siege of Gibraltar. London. OCLC 631054.
- Jackson, William G. F. (1986). The Rock of the Gibraltarians. Cranbury, NJ: Associated University Presses. ISBN 0-8386-3237-8.
- Musteen, Jason R. (2011). Nelson's Refuge: Gibraltar in the Age of Napoleon. New York: Naval Institute Press. ISBN 9781612510842.
- Russell, Jack (1965). Gibraltar besieged, 1779–1783. London: Heinemann. OCLC 2192827.
