= Hardy Rocks =

Rock formations of the Biscoe Islands of Antarctica

The Hardy Rocks (66°16′S 67°17′W) are insular rocks lying 2 nautical miles (4 km) west of DuBois Island, in the Biscoe Islands of Antarctica. They were mapped from air photos taken by the Falkland Islands and Dependencies Aerial Survey Expedition (1956–57), and were named by the UK Antarctic Place-Names Committee for James D. Hardy, an American physiologist who has studied the reactions of the human body to cold environments.
