= Hardy, California =

Unincorporated community in California, United States

Hardy
- Unincorporated community
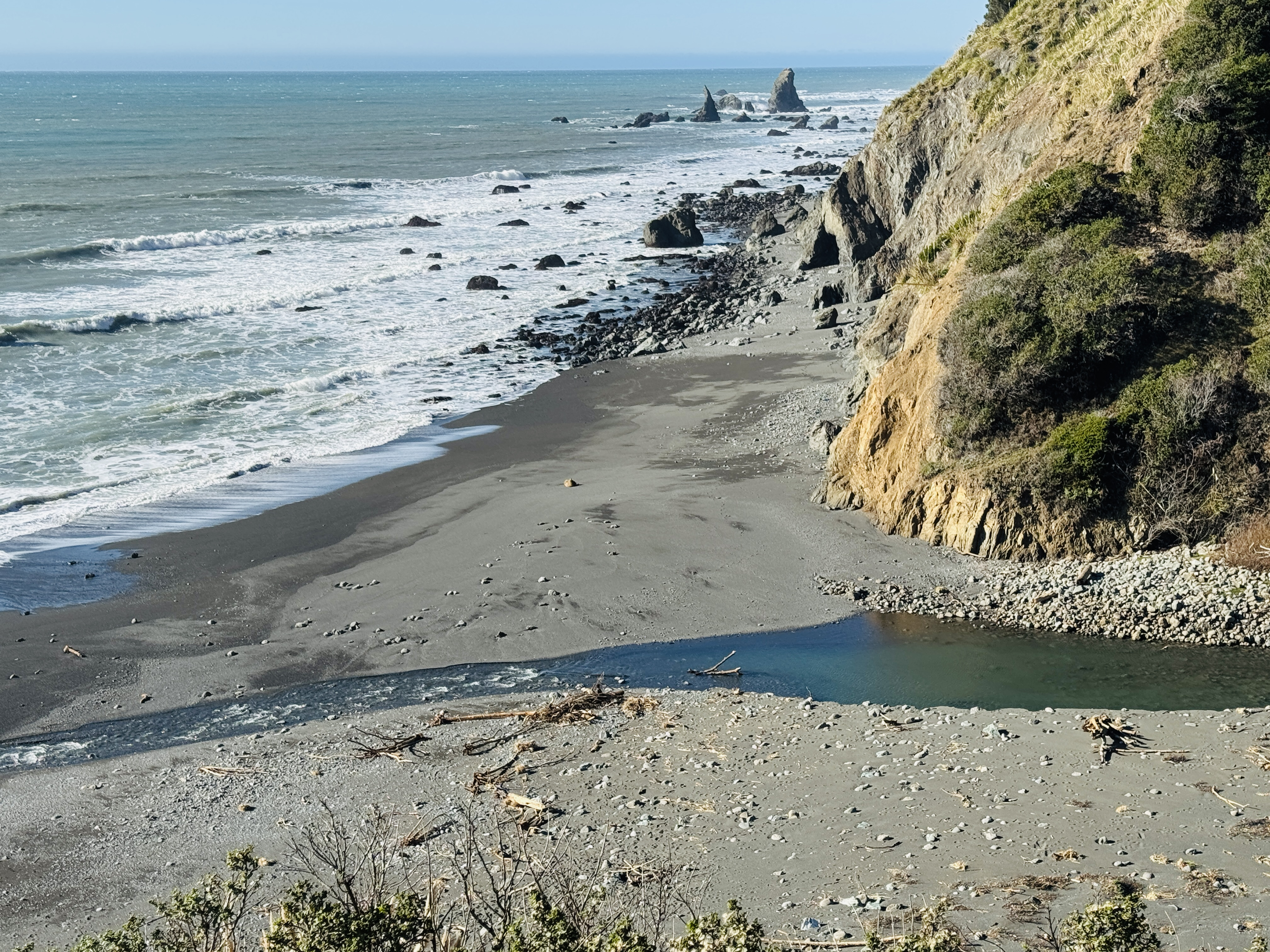
- Hardy Creek spills out into the Pacific Ocean in Hardy, California.

- Location in California Hardy (the United States)
- Coordinates: 39°42′45″N 123°48′11″W
- Country: United States
- State: California
- County: Mendocino
- Elevation: 23 ft (7 m)

Hardy (formerly, Hardyville and Hardy Creek) is an unincorporated community in Mendocino County, California, United States. It is located on California State Route 1 near the Pacific coast, 5.25 miles (8.4 km) north of Westport, at an elevation of 23 feet (7 m).

A post office operated at Hardy from 1902 to 1915. The name honors R.A. Hardy, who owned a wharf nearby. The mill at Hardy Creek was part of the Cottoneva Lumber Company's operation at Rockport. The mill had its own wharf and railroad, and was operated by an E. T. Dusenbury. The town of Hardy also had a large hotel. The mill was ultimately destroyed in a fire and was never rebuilt.
