= HMS Hardy =

Royal Navy ships named HMS Hardy; most named after Vice Admiral Sir Thomas Masterman Hardy

Ten ships of the Royal Navy have borne the name HMS Hardy, most of the later ones have been named for Vice Admiral Sir Thomas Masterman Hardy (1769–1839), captain of HMS Victory during the Battle of Trafalgar:

- HMS Hardy (1797) was a 12-gun gunvessel launched in 1797 and sold in 1802.
- HMS Hardy (1804) was a 12-gun gun-brig launched in 1804. She was used as a storeship from 1818 and a hospital ship from 1821, before being sold in 1835.
- HMS Hardy (1855) was a mortar vessel launched in 1855. She was renamed MV 12 later in 1855 and was sold in 1858.
- HMS Hardy (1856) was an Albacore-class wood screw gunboat launched in 1856 and sold in 1869.
- HMS Hardy (1895) was a Hardy-class destroyer, later reclassified as an A-class destroyer. She was launched in 1895 and sold in 1911.
- HMS Hardy (1912) was an Acasta-class destroyer launched in 1912 and sold for scrap in 1921.
- HMS Hardy (H87) was an H-class destroyer launched in 1936 and sunk off Narvik in 1940.
- HMS Hardy (R08) was a V-class destroyer launched in 1943 and damaged by the German submarine U-278 in 1944, later being scuttled.
- HMS Hardy (F54) was a Blackwood-class ASW frigate launched in 1953 and sunk as a target in 1983.

== See also ==
- HMS Hardi
