= Eric Limeback =

Canadian speedcuber (born 1992)

- Born: November 5, 1992 (age 34); Toronto, Ontario
- Education: Marc Garneau Collegiate Institute
- Known for: Most Rubik's Cubes solved in 24 hours

Eric Limeback (born November 5, 1992) is a Canadian speedcuber. He is known for his 11/11 3×3×3 multi-blindfolded Canadian record solve, as well as his standard 3×3×3 blindfolded solving. Limeback was the first Canadian to achieve a sub-30 second official 3×3×3 blindfolded solve.

He began solving the Rubik's Cube in 9th grade. He graduated from Marc Garneau Collegiate Institute in 2010. On October 3–4, 2013, at Wilfrid Laurier University in Canada, he set a Guinness World Record by solving 5,800 3×3×3 Rubik's Cubes in 24 hours.

== Career ==
Limeback first began solving Rubik's Cubes at the age of 14 in 2007. He entered his first World Cube Association (WCA) competition within five months. In 2009, a YouTube video of him solving 11 cubes blindfolded aired on an Oprah Winfrey Show segment. By 2010, he had become one of Canada's top Rubik's Cube solvers, achieving an official personal best of 7.1 seconds for the 3×3×3 event. In August 2010, he gained national attention through his involvement in a project creating Rubik's Cube mosaics valued at tens of thousands of dollars. In 2011 he was the subject of a short documentary called The Cuber for the National Screen Institute. At that time, he ranked as Canada's second-fastest speedcuber in WCA standings. By 2013, he had set eight Canadian WCA records and held the country's top ranking in blindfolded 3×3×3 solving.

=== World record ===
On 3–4 October 2013 Eric Limeback set a world record for solving the most Rubik's Cubes in a 24-hour period. He set the record at Wilfrid Laurier University in Waterloo, Ontario. He had ten cubes set up in front of him for the record breaking attempt, with a team of volunteers randomly mixing up the cubes and handing them back to keep a cube in his hands at all times. In total he solved a Rubik's cube 5,800 times in 24 hours, ending just before 1 pm Friday. He broke the previous record of 4,786 with 4 hours and 7 minutes left. He finished the 5,800th cube in 23 hours, 59 minutes and 59.7 seconds, with an average solve time of 14.89 seconds per cube.

== National records ==
Limeback previously held the following Canadian speedcubing records:

- 2×2×2 single (also North American record)
- 3×3×3 average
- 4×4×4 average
- 3×3×3 blindfolded single
- Rubik's Clock Single
- Rubik's Clock Average
- Square-1 single
- Square-1 average
- 4×4×4 blindfolded single
- 3×3×3 multi-blindfolded
