= Hardiness =

Hardiness may refer to:

- Hardiness (plants), the ability of plants to survive adverse growing conditions
  - Hardiness zone, area in which a category of plants is capable of growing, as defined by the minimum temperature of that area
- Psychological resilience or mental resilience, positive capacity of people to cope with stress and catastrophe
  - Hardiness (psychology), a conceptual framework for psychological resilience
