= Hardy Pond =

Pond in Waltham, Massachusetts, US

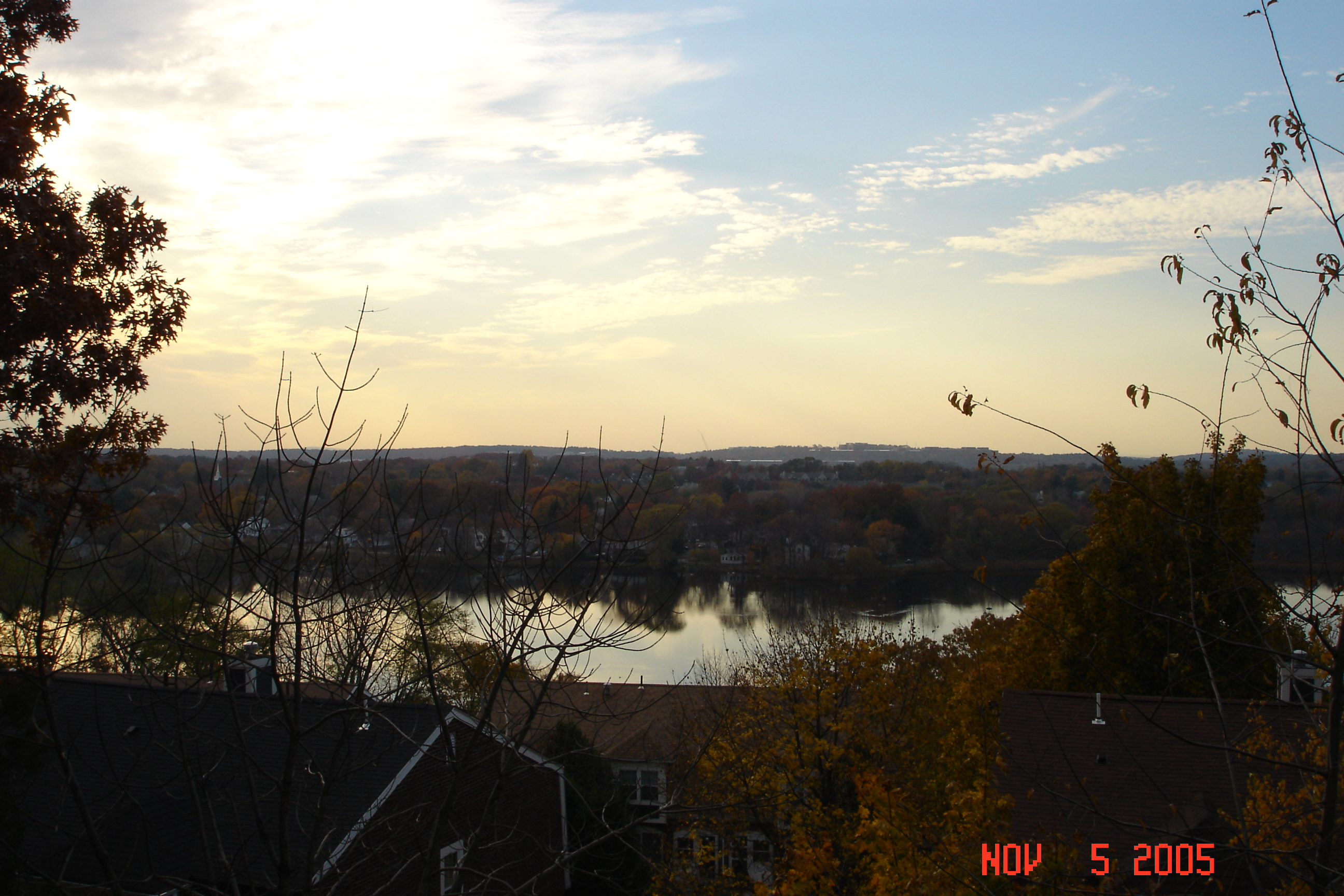

- Location within Massachusetts Location within the United States
- Location: Waltham, Massachusetts
- Coordinates: 42°24′26.53″N 71°14′38.26″W
- Basin countries: United States
- Surface area: 42 acres (17 ha)

Hardy Pond is a 45-acre (180,000 m^{2}) pond located in Waltham, Massachusetts. Originally almost twice the size, in recent times the pond level was lowered in an inappropriate approach to controlling flooding. The quality of the water has degraded due to eutrophication caused by run-off from roads, fertilizers, and storm drain inputs. The pond is contiguous with 35 acres (140,000 m^{2}) of adjoining wetlands. It is a popular site for bird sightings, with over 140 species listed.

There is a boat launch on the pond, off Princeton Street, contiguous to Lazazzero Park. Gas-powered boats are prohibited.
