= Hardy Limeback =

Retired Canadian professor

Hardy Limeback is a Canadian retired full professor (now professor emeritus) and former head of preventive dentistry at the University of Toronto. He received his PhD in collagen biochemistry and his DDS from the University of Toronto. Limeback was one of the twelve panelists who served on the 2006 US National Academies of Sciences/National Research Council's committee on Fluoride in Drinking Water: A Scientific Review of EPA's Standards. He has authored or coauthored over 100 publications on dentistry.

Limeback is known for his stance against fluoridation, which began in 1998, stating that, "The evidence that fluoride is more harmful than beneficial is now overwhelming… fluoride may be destroying our bones, our teeth, and our overall health." Prior to that, he had been called "one of Canada's primary promoters of fluoridation," publishing several papers on its benefits.
