= Regina Lewis =

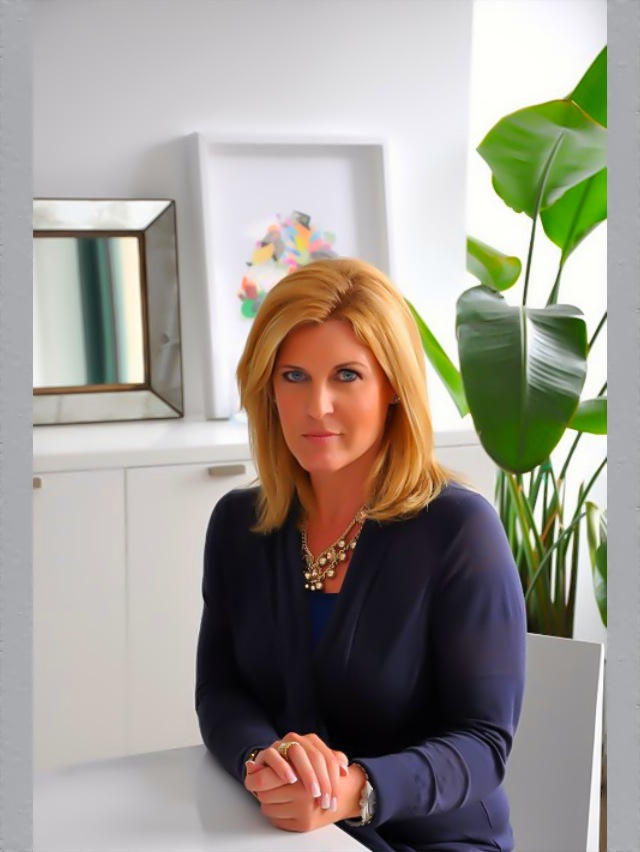

Regina Lewis is an American author and national television contributor.

Her media coverage spans consumer trends.

She was a contributor to USA Today and regularly covered economic headlines for MSNBC.

She held the position of Vice President in the International Division of Marriott International spanning 136 countries and territories. Additionally, she was a consultant to top executives at MGM Resorts International and Aimbridge Hospitality.

Regina first appeared on national TV news in 1999 on the CBS Early Show and was a DIY Network host and co-host on CNNfn and CNN Headline News. She also commentated for Today, The View, and Fox News Channel.

Ms. Lewis was a producer, writer, and reporter for the Emmy-nominated "My Generation" on PBS and is the author of the best-selling book Wired in a Week (Warner Publishing).

She contributed to the primetime series Big Brother and Extra where she hosted red-carpet interviews for major events including the Grammys and the world premiere of Harry Potter.

Over the course of a decade, she was a sought-after spokesperson for AOL, Amazon, Bank of America, and Microsoft.

== Personal life ==
Lewis is married to longtime educator and former football player and coach John Cowne and lives in Northern Virginia. They have six children.
